= Communes of the Haute-Loire department =

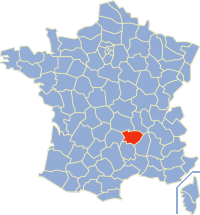

The following is a list of the 257 communes of the Haute-Loire department of France.

The communes cooperate in the following intercommunalities (as of 2025):

- Communauté d'agglomération du Puy-en-Velay
- Communauté de communes Auzon Communauté
- Communauté de communes Brioude Sud Auvergne
- Communauté de communes du Haut-Lignon
- Communauté de communes Haut Pays du Velay
- Communauté de communes Loire et Semène
- Communauté de communes Marches du Velay-Rochebaron
- Communauté de communes Mézenc-Loire-Meygal
- Communauté de communes des Pays de Cayres et de Pradelles
- Communauté de communes des Rives du Haut Allier
- Communauté de communes des Sucs

INSEE	Postal	Commune
43001	43100	Agnat
43002	43000	Aiguilhe
43003	43270	Allègre
43004	43150	Alleyrac
43005	43580	Alleyras
43006	43380	Ally
43007	43200	Araules
43008	43490	Arlempdes
43009	43380	Arlet
43010	43700	Arsac-en-Velay
43011	43380	Aubazat
43012	43110	Aurec-sur-Loire
43014	43450	Autrac
43015	43300	Auvers
43016	43390	Auzon
43017	43390	Azérat
43018	43370	Bains
43019	43340	Barges
43020	43210	Bas-en-Basset
43021	43800	Beaulieu
43022	43100	Beaumont
43023	43500	Beaune-sur-Arzon
43024	43200	Beaux
43025	43590	Beauzac
43026	43350	Bellevue-la-Montagne
43027	43160	Berbezit
43028	43200	Bessamorel
43029	43170	La Besseyre-Saint-Mary
43030	43350	Blanzac
43031	43380	Blassac
43032	43700	Blavozy
43033	43450	Blesle
43034	43500	Boisset
43035	43160	Bonneval
43036	43350	Borne
43037	43510	Le Bouchet-Saint-Nicolas
43038	43360	Bournoncle-Saint-Pierre
43039	43370	Le Brignon
43040	43100	Brioude
43041	43700	Brives-Charensac
43042	43510	Cayres
43043	43270	Céaux-d'Allègre
43044	43380	Cerzat
43045	43000	Ceyssac
43046	43770	Chadrac
43047	43150	Chadron
43048	43160	La Chaise-Dieu
43049	43800	Chamalières-sur-Loire
43050	43410	Chambezon
43051	43400	Le Chambon-sur-Lignon
43052	43440	Champagnac-le-Vieux
43053	43260	Champclause
43054	43170	Chanaleilles
43055	43100	Chaniat
43056	43300	Chanteuges
43057	43270	La Chapelle-Bertin
43058	43120	La Chapelle-d'Aurec
43059	43160	La Chapelle-Geneste
43060	43300	Charraix
43061	43700	Chaspinhac
43062	43320	Chaspuzac
43063	43230	Chassagnes
43064	43440	Chassignolles
43065	43300	Chastel
43066	43430	Chaudeyrolles
43067	43230	Chavaniac-Lafayette
43068	43300	Chazelles
43069	43190	Chenereilles
43070	43380	Chilhac
43071	43500	Chomelix
43072	43230	La Chomette
43073	43160	Cistrières
43074	43100	Cohade
43075	43230	Collat
43076	43160	Connangles
43077	43490	Costaros
43078	43700	Coubon
43079	43230	Couteuges
43080	43500	Craponne-sur-Arzon
43082	43300	Cronce
43083	43170	Cubelles
43084	43370	Cussac-sur-Loire
43085	43300	Desges
43086	43230	Domeyrat
43087	43220	Dunières
43088	43450	Espalem
43089	43000	Espaly-Saint-Marcel
43090	43170	Esplantas-Vazeilles
43091	43150	Les Estables
43092	43430	Fay-sur-Lignon
43093	43160	Felines
43094	43300	Ferrussac
43095	43320	Fix-Saint-Geneys
43096	43100	Fontannes
43097	43150	Freycenet-la-Cuche
43098	43150	Freycenet-la-Tour
43099	43250	Frugerès-les-Mines
43100	43230	Frugières-le-Pin
43101	43150	Goudet
43102	43200	Grazac
43103	43450	Grenier-Montgon
43104	43170	Grèzes
43105	43100	Javaugues
43106	43230	Jax
43107	43230	Josat
43108	43500	Jullianges
43109	43490	Lafarre
43110	43100	Lamothe
43111	43340	Landos
43112	43300	Langeac
43113	43260	Lantriac
43114	43200	Lapte
43115	43150	Laussonne
43116	43440	Laval-sur-Doulon
43117	43100	Lavaudieu
43118	43380	Lavoûte-Chilhac
43119	43800	Lavoûte-sur-Loire
43120	43410	Lempdes-sur-Allagnon
43121	43410	Léotoing
43122	43350	Lissac
43123	43360	Lorlanges
43124	43320	Loudes
43125	43100	Lubilhac
43126	43800	Malrevers
43127	43210	Malvalette
43128	43160	Malvières
43129	43190	Le Mas-de-Tence
43131	43230	Mazerat-Aurouze
43130	43520	Mazet-Saint-Voy

INSEE	Postal	Commune
43132	43300	Mazeyrat-d'Allier
43133	43100	Mercœur
43134	43800	Mézères
43135	43150	Le Monastier-sur-Gazeille
43136	43580	Monistrol-d'Allier
43137	43120	Monistrol-sur-Loire
43138	43270	Monlet
43139	43230	Montclard
43140	43700	Le Monteil
43141	43290	Montfaucon-en-Velay
43142	43290	Montregard
43143	43260	Montusclat
43144	43150	Moudeyres
43145	43510	Ouides
43147	43100	Paulhac
43148	43230	Paulhaguet
43149	43300	Pébrac
43150	43200	Le Pertuis
43151	43300	Pinols
43152	43000	Polignac
43153	43330	Pont-Salomon
43154	43420	Pradelles
43155	43300	Prades
43156	43150	Présailles
43157	43000	Le Puy-en-Velay
43158	43260	Queyrières
43159	43290	Raucoules
43160	43340	Rauret
43162	43130	Retournac
43163	43220	Riotord
43164	43810	Roche-en-Régnier
43165	43800	Rosières
43166	43130	Saint-André-de-Chalencon
43167	43300	Saint-Arcons-d'Allier
43168	43420	Saint-Arcons-de-Barges
43169	43380	Saint-Austremoine
43170	43100	Saint-Beauzire
43171	43300	Saint-Bérain
43172	43290	Saint-Bonnet-le-Froid
43173	43340	Saint-Christophe-d'Allier
43174	43370	Saint-Christophe-sur-Dolaizon
43175	43380	Saint-Cirgues
43177	43140	Saint-Didier-en-Velay
43178	43440	Saint-Didier-sur-Doulon
43183	43230	Sainte-Eugénie-de-Villeneuve
43185	43250	Sainte-Florine
43208	43230	Sainte-Marguerite
43224	43600	Sainte-Sigolène
43180	43420	Saint-Étienne-du-Vigan
43181	43260	Saint-Étienne-Lardeyrol
43182	43450	Saint-Étienne-sur-Blesle
43184	43330	Saint-Ferréol-d'Auroure
43186	43550	Saint-Front
43187	43350	Saint-Geneys-près-Saint-Paulien
43188	43230	Saint-Georges-d'Aurac
43189	43500	Saint-Georges-Lagricol
43190	43700	Saint-Germain-Laprade
43191	43360	Saint-Géron
43192	43340	Saint-Haon
43193	43390	Saint-Hilaire
43194	43260	Saint-Hostien
43195	43380	Saint-Ilpize
43196	43500	Saint-Jean-d'Aubrigoux
43197	43320	Saint-Jean-de-Nay
43198	43510	Saint-Jean-Lachalm
43199	43200	Saint-Jeures
43200	43260	Saint-Julien-Chapteuil
43201	43500	Saint-Julien-d'Ance
43202	43300	Saint-Julien-des-Chazes
43203	43200	Saint-Julien-du-Pinet
43204	43220	Saint-Julien-Molhesabate
43205	43240	Saint-Just-Malmont
43206	43100	Saint-Just-près-Brioude
43207	43100	Saint-Laurent-Chabreuges
43210	43150	Saint-Martin-de-Fugères
43211	43200	Saint-Maurice-de-Lignon
43212	43500	Saint-Pal-de-Chalencon
43213	43620	Saint-Pal-de-Mons
43214	43160	Saint-Pal-de-Senouire
43215	43420	Saint-Paul-de-Tartas
43216	43350	Saint-Paulien
43217	43130	Saint-Pierre-du-Champ
43218	43260	Saint-Pierre-Eynac
43219	43230	Saint-Préjet-Armandon
43220	43580	Saint-Préjet-d'Allier
43221	43580	Saint-Privat-d'Allier
43222	43380	Saint-Privat-du-Dragon
43223	43620	Saint-Romain-Lachalm
43225	43580	Saint-Vénérand
43226	43440	Saint-Vert
43227	43140	Saint-Victor-Malescours
43228	43500	Saint-Victor-sur-Arlanc
43229	43320	Saint-Vidal
43230	43800	Saint-Vincent
43231	43150	Salettes
43232	43230	Salzuit
43233	43320	Sanssac-l'Église
43234	43170	Saugues
43236	43140	La Séauve-sur-Semène
43237	43160	Sembadel
43238	43510	Séneujols
43239	43300	Siaugues-Sainte-Marie
43240	43130	Solignac-sous-Roche
43241	43370	Solignac-sur-Loire
43242	43300	Tailhac
43244	43190	Tence
43245	43170	Thoras
43246	43130	Tiranges
43247	43450	Torsiac
43249	43210	Valprivas
43250	43230	Vals-le-Chastel
43251	43750	Vals-près-le-Puy
43252	43270	Varennes-Saint-Honorat
43253	43430	Les Vastres
43254	43320	Vazeilles-Limandre
43256	43170	Venteuges
43257	43320	Vergezac
43258	43360	Vergongheon
43259	43270	Vernassal
43260	43320	Le Vernet
43261	43390	Vézézoux
43262	43100	Vieille-Brioude
43263	43490	Vielprat
43264	43380	Villeneuve-d'Allier
43265	43600	Les Villettes
43013	43300	Vissac-Auteyrac
43267	43800	Vorey
43268	43200	Yssingeaux
