= Léotoing =

- Commune
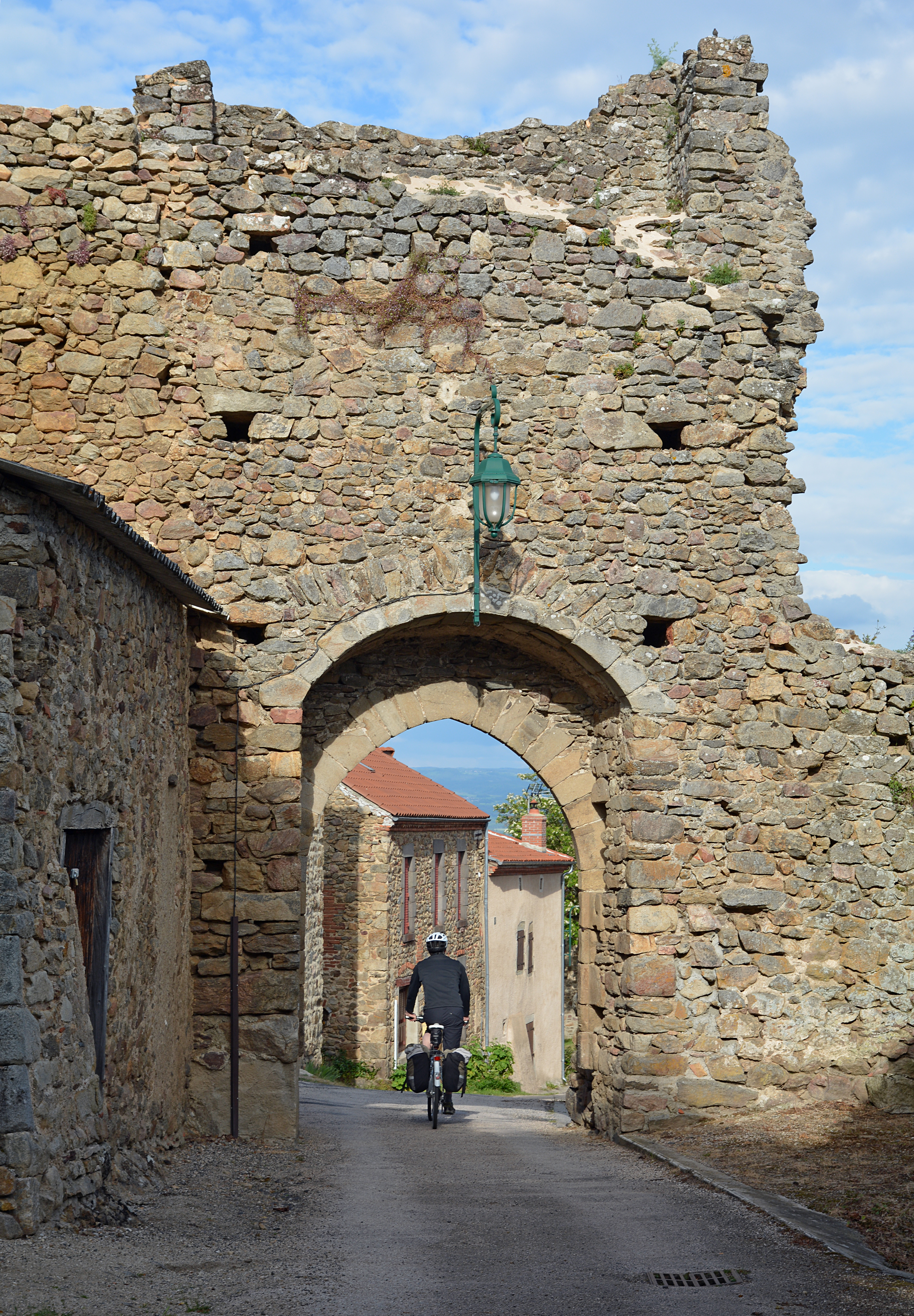
- Village gate
- Location of Léotoing
- Location within France Location within Auvergne-Rhône-Alpes
- Coordinates: 45°21′46″N 3°13′27″E
- Country: France
- Region: Auvergne-Rhône-Alpes
- Department: Haute-Loire
- Arrondissement: Brioude
- Canton: Sainte-Florine

Government
  - Mayor (2020–2026): Nicolas Sabatier
- Area^{1}: 19.56 km^{2} (7.55 sq mi)
- Elevation: 462 m (1,516 ft)
- Highest elevation: 701 m (2,300 ft)
- Lowest elevation: 460 m (1,510 ft)
- Population (2023): 226
  - Density: 11.6/km^{2} (29.9/sq mi)
- Time zone: UTC+01:00 (CET)
  - Summer (DST): UTC+02:00 (CEST)
- INSEE/Postal code: 43121 /43410
- ^{1} French Land Register data, which excludes lakes, ponds, glaciers > 1 km^{2} (0.386 sq mi or 247 acres) and river estuaries.

Léotoing (French pronunciation: [leɔtwɛ̃]; Occitan: Lauton) is a commune in the Haute-Loire department in south-central France.

== Population ==
Historical population
Year	Pop.	±% p.a.
1968	247	—
1975	218	−1.77%
1982	200	−1.22%
1990	214	+0.85%
1999	208	−0.32%
2007	206	−0.12%
2012	217	+1.05%
2017	234	+1.52%
2023	226	−0.58%
Source: INSEE

== See also ==
- Communes of the Haute-Loire department
