= Sainte-Eugénie-de-Villeneuve =

- Commune
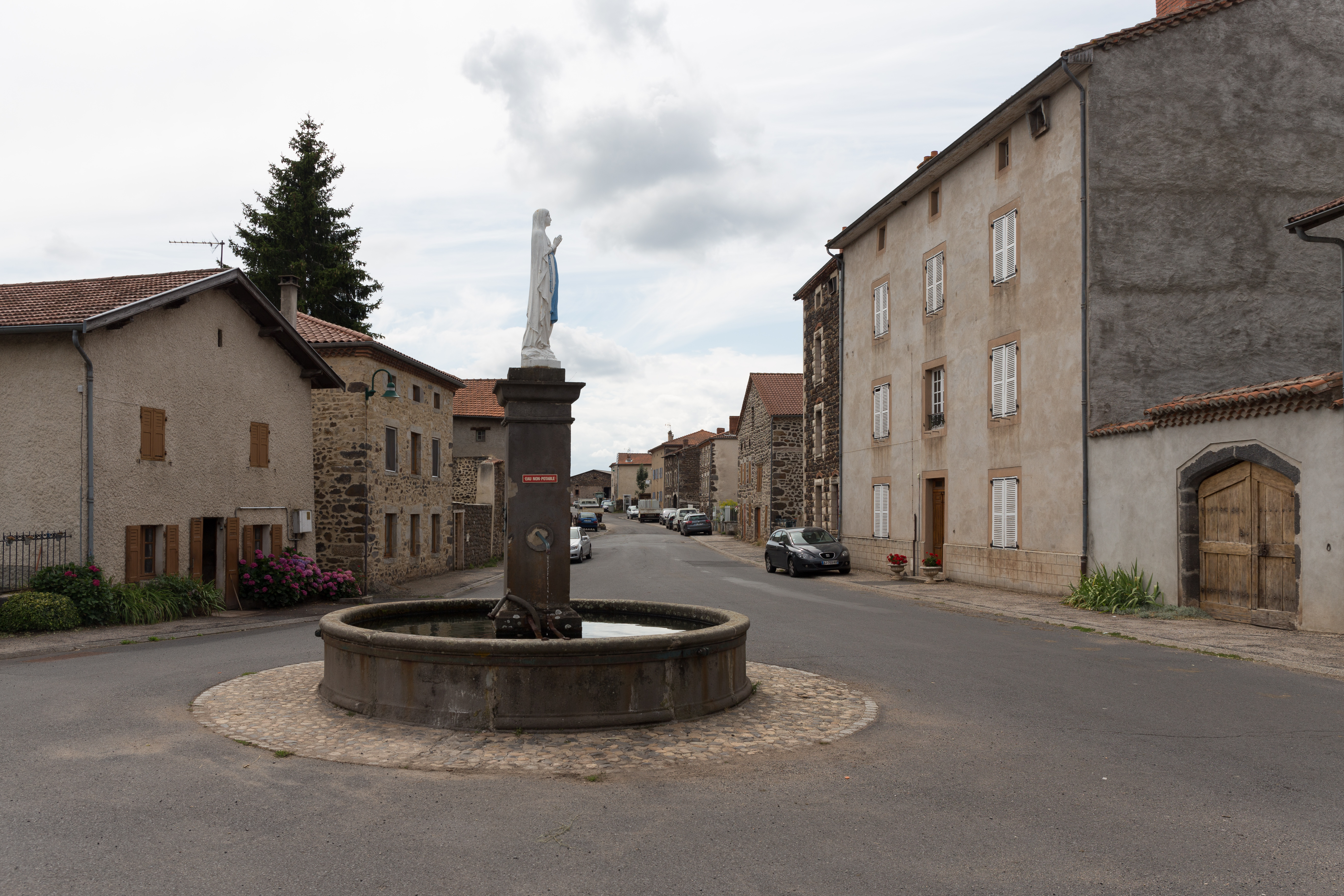
- Location of Sainte-Eugénie-de-Villeneuve
- Location within France Location within Auvergne-Rhône-Alpes
- Coordinates: 45°08′24″N 3°37′27″E
- Country: France
- Region: Auvergne-Rhône-Alpes
- Department: Haute-Loire
- Arrondissement: Brioude
- Canton: Pays de Lafayette

Government
  - Mayor (2020–2026): Karine Cros
- Area^{1}: 6.11 km^{2} (2.36 sq mi)
- Elevation: 972 m (3,189 ft)
- Highest elevation: 1,129 m (3,704 ft)
- Lowest elevation: 829 m (2,720 ft)
- Population (2023): 103
  - Density: 16.9/km^{2} (43.7/sq mi)
- Time zone: UTC+01:00 (CET)
  - Summer (DST): UTC+02:00 (CEST)
- INSEE/Postal code: 43183 /43230
- ^{1} French Land Register data, which excludes lakes, ponds, glaciers > 1 km^{2} (0.386 sq mi or 247 acres) and river estuaries.

Sainte-Eugénie-de-Villeneuve (French pronunciation: [sɛ̃t øʒeni də vilnœv]; Occitan: Senta Gènia de Vilanòva) is a commune in the Haute-Loire department in south-central France.

== Population ==
Historical population
Year	Pop.	±% p.a.
1968	112	—
1975	121	+1.11%
1982	108	−1.61%
1990	102	−0.71%
1999	109	+0.74%
2007	98	−1.32%
2012	87	−2.35%
2017	107	+4.23%
2023	103	−0.63%
Source: INSEE

== See also ==
- Communes of the Haute-Loire department
