= Aubazat =

- Commune
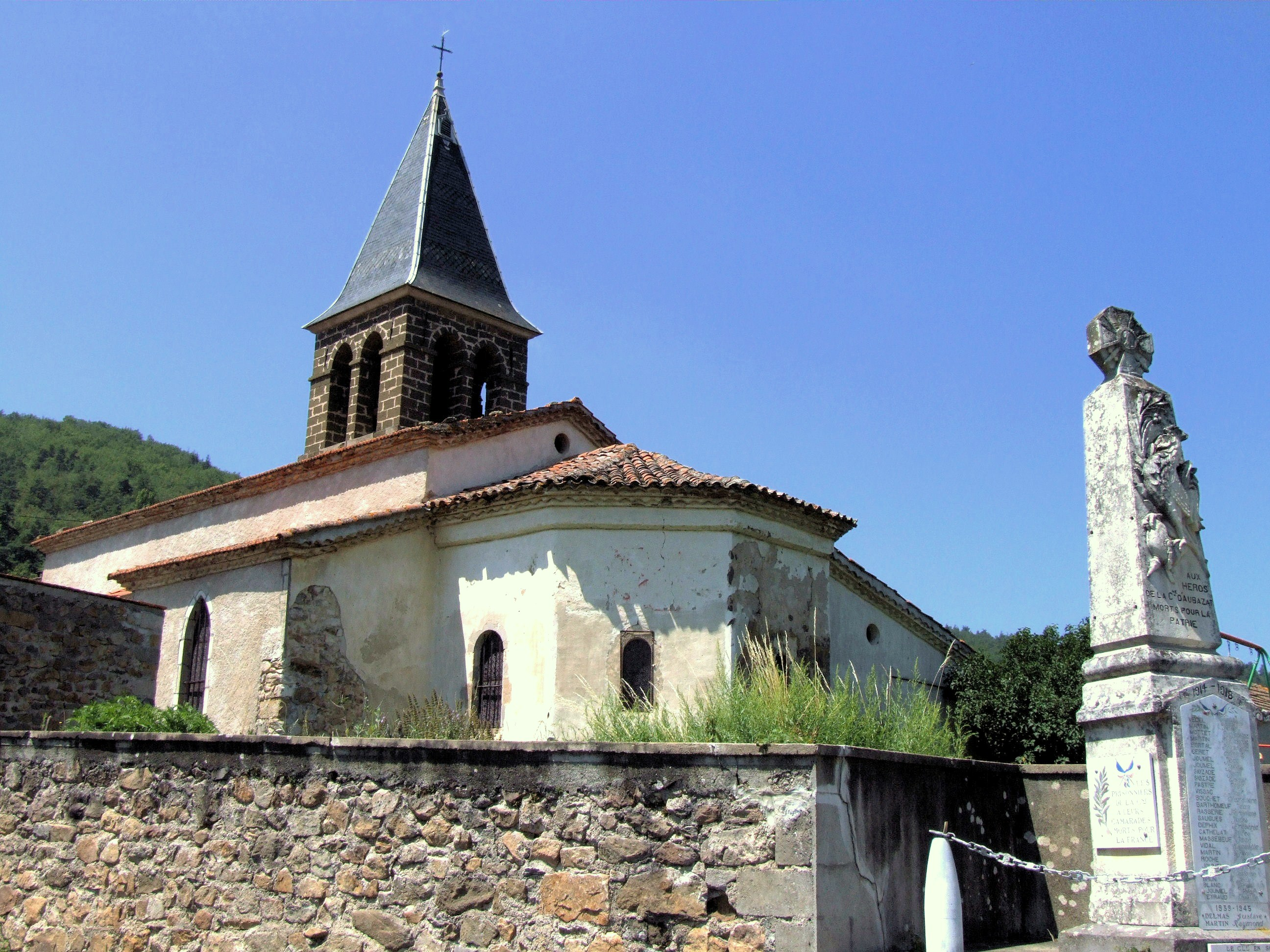
- Church of Saint-Roch and war memorial
- Location of Aubazat
- Location within France Location within Auvergne-Rhône-Alpes
- Coordinates: 45°08′N 3°26′E
- Country: France
- Region: Auvergne-Rhône-Alpes
- Department: Haute-Loire
- Arrondissement: Brioude
- Canton: Pays de Lafayette
- Intercommunality: Rives du Haut Allier

Government
  - Mayor (2020–2026): Alain Tavenard-Dephix
- Area^{1}: 16.38 km^{2} (6.32 sq mi)
- Elevation: 640 m (2,100 ft)
- Highest elevation: 848 m (2,782 ft)
- Lowest elevation: 464 m (1,522 ft)
- Population (2023): 175
  - Density: 10.7/km^{2} (27.7/sq mi)
- Time zone: UTC+01:00 (CET)
  - Summer (DST): UTC+02:00 (CEST)
- INSEE/Postal code: 43011 /43380
- ^{1} French Land Register data, which excludes lakes, ponds, glaciers > 1 km^{2} (0.386 sq mi or 247 acres) and river estuaries.

Aubazat (French pronunciation: [obaza]) is a commune in the Haute-Loire department and Auvergne-Rhône-Alpes region of south-east central France.

== Population ==
Historical population
Year	Pop.	±% p.a.
1968	200	—
1975	169	−2.38%
1982	163	−0.52%
1990	155	−0.63%
1999	172	+1.16%
2007	184	+0.85%
2012	177	−0.77%
2017	178	+0.11%
2023	175	−0.28%
Source: INSEE

== See also ==
- Communes of the Haute-Loire department
