= Vals-le-Chastel =

- Commune
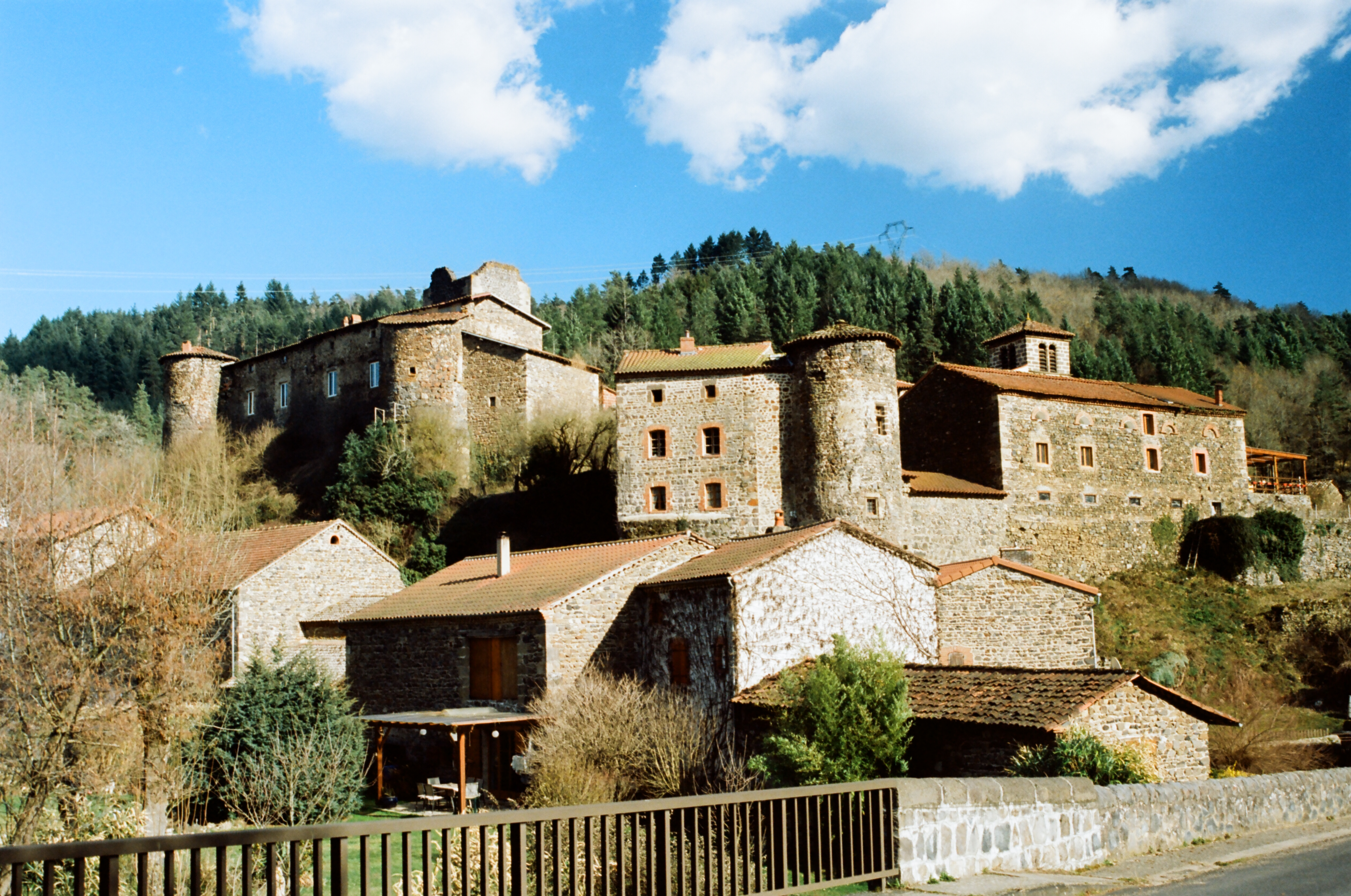
- Location of Vals-le-Chastel
- Location within France Location within Auvergne-Rhône-Alpes
- Coordinates: 45°16′18″N 3°31′19″E
- Country: France
- Region: Auvergne-Rhône-Alpes
- Department: Haute-Loire
- Arrondissement: Brioude
- Canton: Pays de Lafayette

Government
  - Mayor (2020–2026): Jean-Marc Cubizolles
- Area^{1}: 3.99 km^{2} (1.54 sq mi)
- Elevation: 530 m (1,740 ft)
- Highest elevation: 777 m (2,549 ft)
- Lowest elevation: 507 m (1,663 ft)
- Population (2023): 39
  - Density: 9.8/km^{2} (25/sq mi)
- Time zone: UTC+01:00 (CET)
  - Summer (DST): UTC+02:00 (CEST)
- INSEE/Postal code: 43250 /43230
- ^{1} French Land Register data, which excludes lakes, ponds, glaciers > 1 km^{2} (0.386 sq mi or 247 acres) and river estuaries.

Vals-le-Chastel is a commune in the Haute-Loire department in south-central France.

== Population ==
Historical population
Year	Pop.	±% p.a.
1968	63	—
1975	62	−0.23%
1982	46	−4.17%
1990	44	−0.55%
1999	46	+0.50%
2007	49	+0.79%
2012	45	−1.69%
2017	44	−0.45%
2023	39	−1.99%
Source: INSEE

== See also ==
- Communes of the Haute-Loire department
