= Chassagnes =

- Commune
- Location of Chassagnes
- Location within France Location within Auvergne-Rhône-Alpes
- Coordinates: 45°12′55″N 3°32′20″E
- Country: France
- Region: Auvergne-Rhône-Alpes
- Department: Haute-Loire
- Arrondissement: Brioude
- Canton: Pays de Lafayette
- Intercommunality: Rives du Haut Allier

Government
  - Mayor (2020–2026): Mikaël Vacher
- Area^{1}: 12.24 km^{2} (4.73 sq mi)
- Elevation: 630 m (2,070 ft)
- Highest elevation: 871 m (2,858 ft)
- Lowest elevation: 529 m (1,736 ft)
- Population (2023): 160
  - Density: 13/km^{2} (34/sq mi)
- Time zone: UTC+01:00 (CET)
  - Summer (DST): UTC+02:00 (CEST)
- INSEE/Postal code: 43063 /43230
- ^{1} French Land Register data, which excludes lakes, ponds, glaciers > 1 km^{2} (0.386 sq mi or 247 acres) and river estuaries.

Chassagnes (French pronunciation: [ʃasaɲ]; Occitan: Chassanha) is a commune in the Haute-Loire department and Auvergne-Rhône-Alpes region of south-east central France.

== Population ==
Historical population
| Year | Pop. | ±% p.a. |
|---|---|---|
| 1968 | 181 | — |
| 1975 | 156 | −2.10% |
| 1982 | 144 | −1.14% |
| 1990 | 141 | −0.26% |
| 1999 | 129 | −0.98% |
| 2007 | 175 | +3.89% |
| 2012 | 169 | −0.70% |
| 2017 | 157 | −1.46% |
| 2023 | 160 | +0.32% |
Source: INSEE

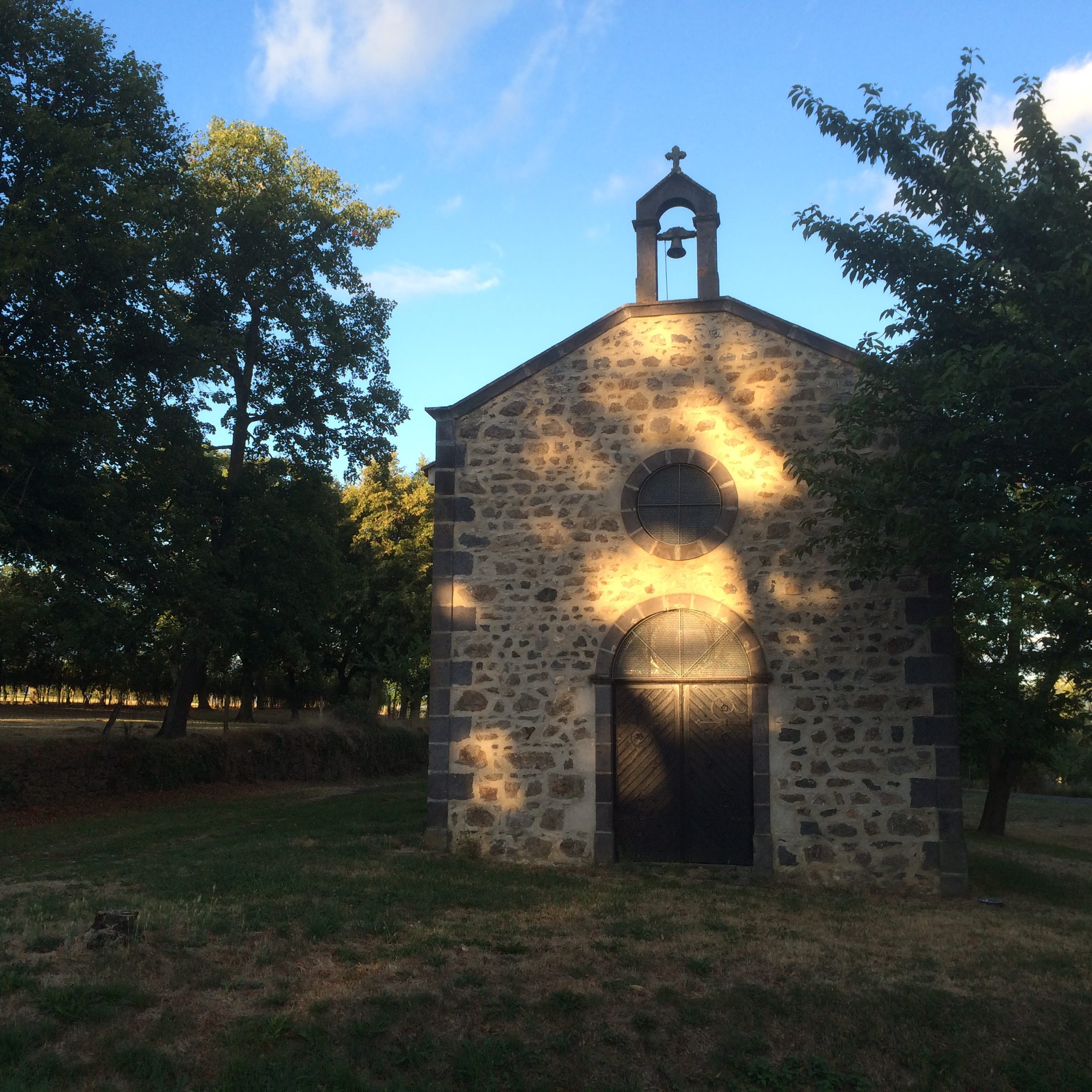

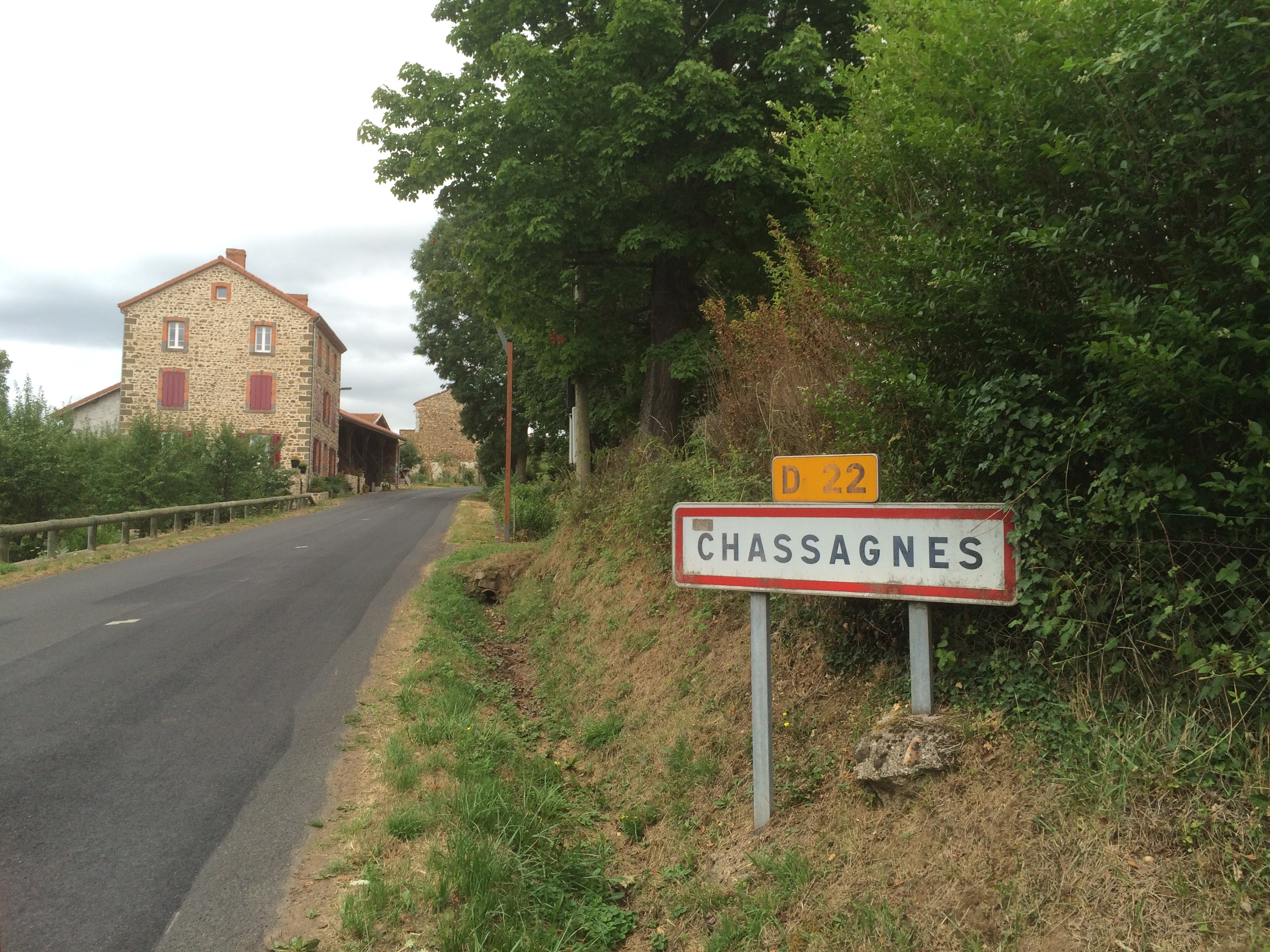

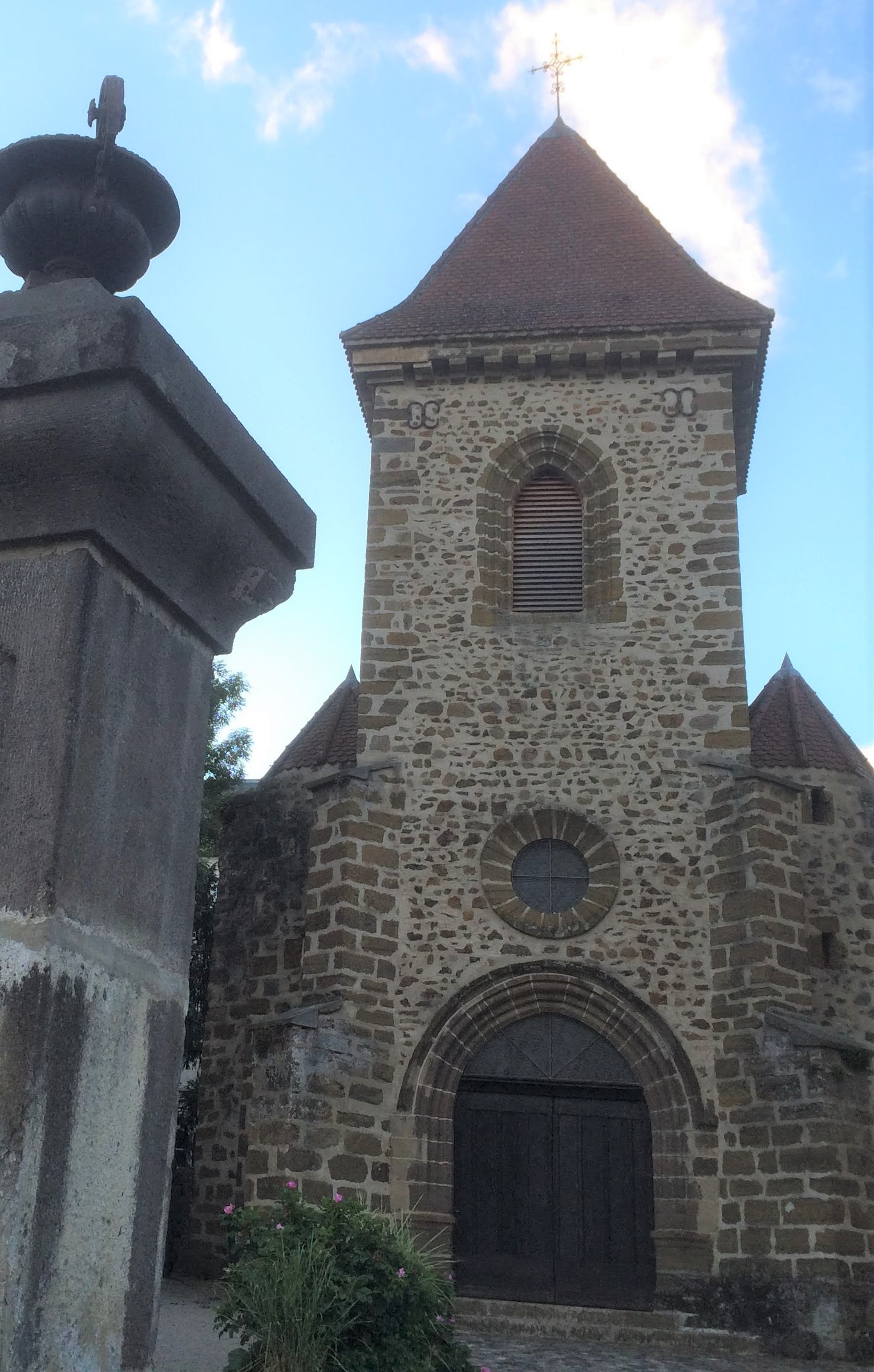

== See also ==
- Communes of the Haute-Loire department
