= Saint-Just-près-Brioude =

- Commune
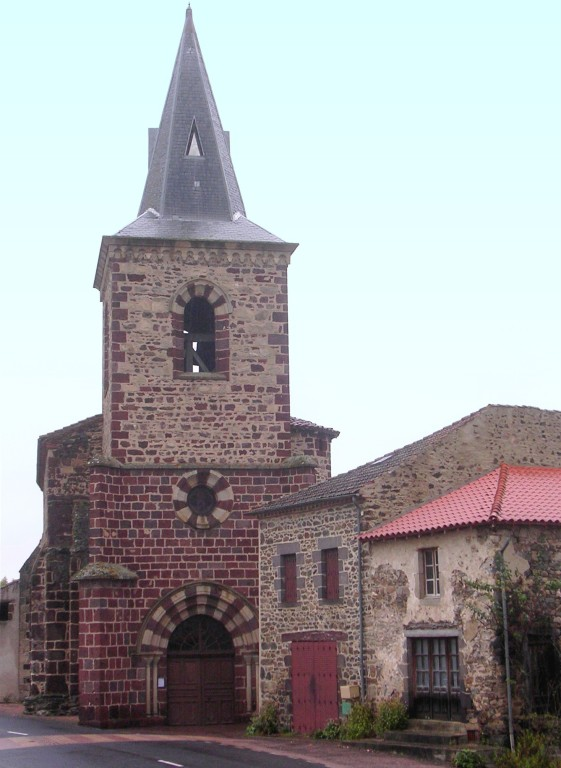
- Location of Saint-Just-près-Brioude
- Location within France Location within Auvergne-Rhône-Alpes
- Coordinates: 45°14′21″N 3°21′11″E
- Country: France
- Region: Auvergne-Rhône-Alpes
- Department: Haute-Loire
- Arrondissement: Brioude
- Canton: Pays de Lafayette
- Intercommunality: Brioude Sud Auvergne

Government
  - Mayor (2020–2026): Jérôme Joussouy
- Area^{1}: 46.94 km^{2} (18.12 sq mi)
- Elevation: 530 m (1,740 ft)
- Highest elevation: 941 m (3,087 ft)
- Lowest elevation: 513 m (1,683 ft)
- Population (2023): 398
  - Density: 8.48/km^{2} (22.0/sq mi)
- Time zone: UTC+01:00 (CET)
  - Summer (DST): UTC+02:00 (CEST)
- INSEE/Postal code: 43206 /43100
- ^{1} French Land Register data, which excludes lakes, ponds, glaciers > 1 km^{2} (0.386 sq mi or 247 acres) and river estuaries.

Saint-Just-près-Brioude (French pronunciation: [sɛ̃ ʒyst pʁɛ bʁijud], literally Saint-Just near Brioude; Auvergnat: Sent Just de Briude) is a commune in the Haute-Loire department in south-central France.

== Population ==
Historical population
Year	Pop.	±% p.a.
1968	586	—
1975	515	−1.83%
1982	465	−1.45%
1990	394	−2.05%
1999	390	−0.11%
2007	397	+0.22%
2012	435	+1.85%
2017	426	−0.42%
2023	398	−1.13%
Source: INSEE

== See also ==
- Communes of the Haute-Loire department
