= Tailhac =

- Commune
- Location of Tailhac
- Location within France Location within Auvergne-Rhône-Alpes
- Coordinates: 45°02′32″N 3°27′28″E
- Country: France
- Region: Auvergne-Rhône-Alpes
- Department: Haute-Loire
- Arrondissement: Brioude
- Canton: Gorges de l'Allier-Gévaudan

Government
  - Mayor (2020–2026): Guy Lafond
- Area^{1}: 12.52 km^{2} (4.83 sq mi)
- Elevation: 680 m (2,230 ft)
- Highest elevation: 1,067 m (3,501 ft)
- Lowest elevation: 575 m (1,886 ft)
- Population (2023): 59
  - Density: 4.7/km^{2} (12/sq mi)
- Time zone: UTC+01:00 (CET)
  - Summer (DST): UTC+02:00 (CEST)
- INSEE/Postal code: 43242 /43300
- ^{1} French Land Register data, which excludes lakes, ponds, glaciers > 1 km^{2} (0.386 sq mi or 247 acres) and river estuaries.

Tailhac (French pronunciation: [tajak]) is a commune in the Haute-Loire department in south-central France.

== Population ==
Historical population
Year	Pop.	±% p.a.
1968	95	—
1975	86	−1.41%
1982	79	−1.21%
1990	68	−1.86%
1999	73	+0.79%
2007	81	+1.31%
2012	72	−2.33%
2017	72	+0.00%
2023	59	−3.26%
Source: INSEE

== See also ==
- Communes of the Haute-Loire department
