= Saint-Privat-du-Dragon =

- Commune
- Location of Saint-Privat-du-Dragon
- Location within France Location within Auvergne-Rhône-Alpes
- Coordinates: 45°11′21″N 3°26′52″E
- Country: France
- Region: Auvergne-Rhône-Alpes
- Department: Haute-Loire
- Arrondissement: Brioude
- Canton: Pays de Lafayette

Government
  - Mayor (2020–2026): Agnès Jean
- Area^{1}: 21.66 km^{2} (8.36 sq mi)
- Elevation: 680 m (2,230 ft)
- Highest elevation: 780 m (2,560 ft)
- Lowest elevation: 449 m (1,473 ft)
- Population (2023): 169
  - Density: 7.80/km^{2} (20.2/sq mi)
- Time zone: UTC+01:00 (CET)
  - Summer (DST): UTC+02:00 (CEST)
- INSEE/Postal code: 43222 /43380
- ^{1} French Land Register data, which excludes lakes, ponds, glaciers > 1 km^{2} (0.386 sq mi or 247 acres) and river estuaries.

Saint-Privat-du-Dragon (French pronunciation: [sɛ̃ pʁiva dy dʁaɡɔ̃]; Occitan: Sent Privat del Dragon) is a commune in the Haute-Loire department in south-central France.

== Population ==
Historical population
Year	Pop.	±% p.a.
1968	292	—
1975	264	−1.43%
1982	236	−1.59%
1990	213	−1.27%
1999	186	−1.49%
2007	172	−0.97%
2012	166	−0.71%
2017	157	−1.11%
2023	169	+1.24%
Source: INSEE

== See also ==
- Communes of the Haute-Loire department
