= Ally, Haute-Loire =

Ally
- Commune
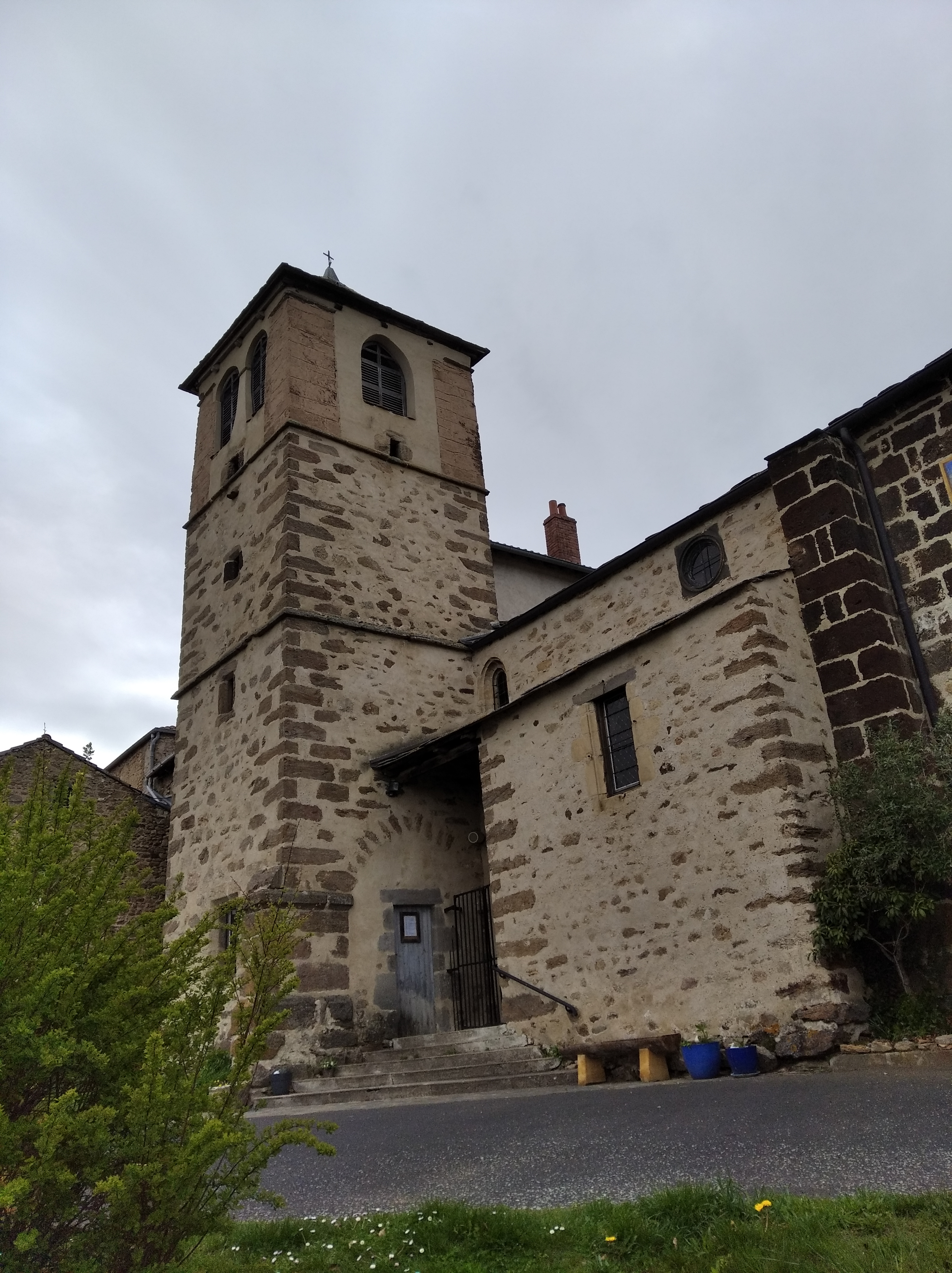
- Location of Ally
- Location within France Location within Auvergne-Rhône-Alpes
- Coordinates: 45°09′36″N 3°18′54″E
- Country: France
- Region: Auvergne-Rhône-Alpes
- Department: Haute-Loire
- Arrondissement: Brioude
- Canton: Pays de Lafayette
- Intercommunality: Rives du Haut Allier

Government
  - Mayor (2020–2026): Jean-Louis Portal
- Area^{1}: 31.13 km^{2} (12.02 sq mi)
- Elevation: 965 m (3,166 ft)
- Highest elevation: 1,109 m (3,638 ft)
- Lowest elevation: 549 m (1,801 ft)
- Population (2023): 123
  - Density: 3.95/km^{2} (10.2/sq mi)
- Time zone: UTC+01:00 (CET)
  - Summer (DST): UTC+02:00 (CEST)
- INSEE/Postal code: 43006 /43380
- ^{1} French Land Register data, which excludes lakes, ponds, glaciers > 1 km^{2} (0.386 sq mi or 247 acres) and river estuaries.

Ally (French pronunciation: [ali]; Occitan: Ali) is a commune in the Haute-Loire department in south-central France.

== Population ==
Historical population
Year	Pop.	±% p.a.
1968	376	—
1975	292	−3.55%
1982	279	−0.65%
1990	237	−2.02%
1999	222	−0.72%
2007	181	−2.52%
2012	154	−3.18%
2017	139	−2.03%
2023	123	−2.02%
Source: INSEE

== See also ==
- Communes of the Haute-Loire department
