= Javaugues =

- Commune
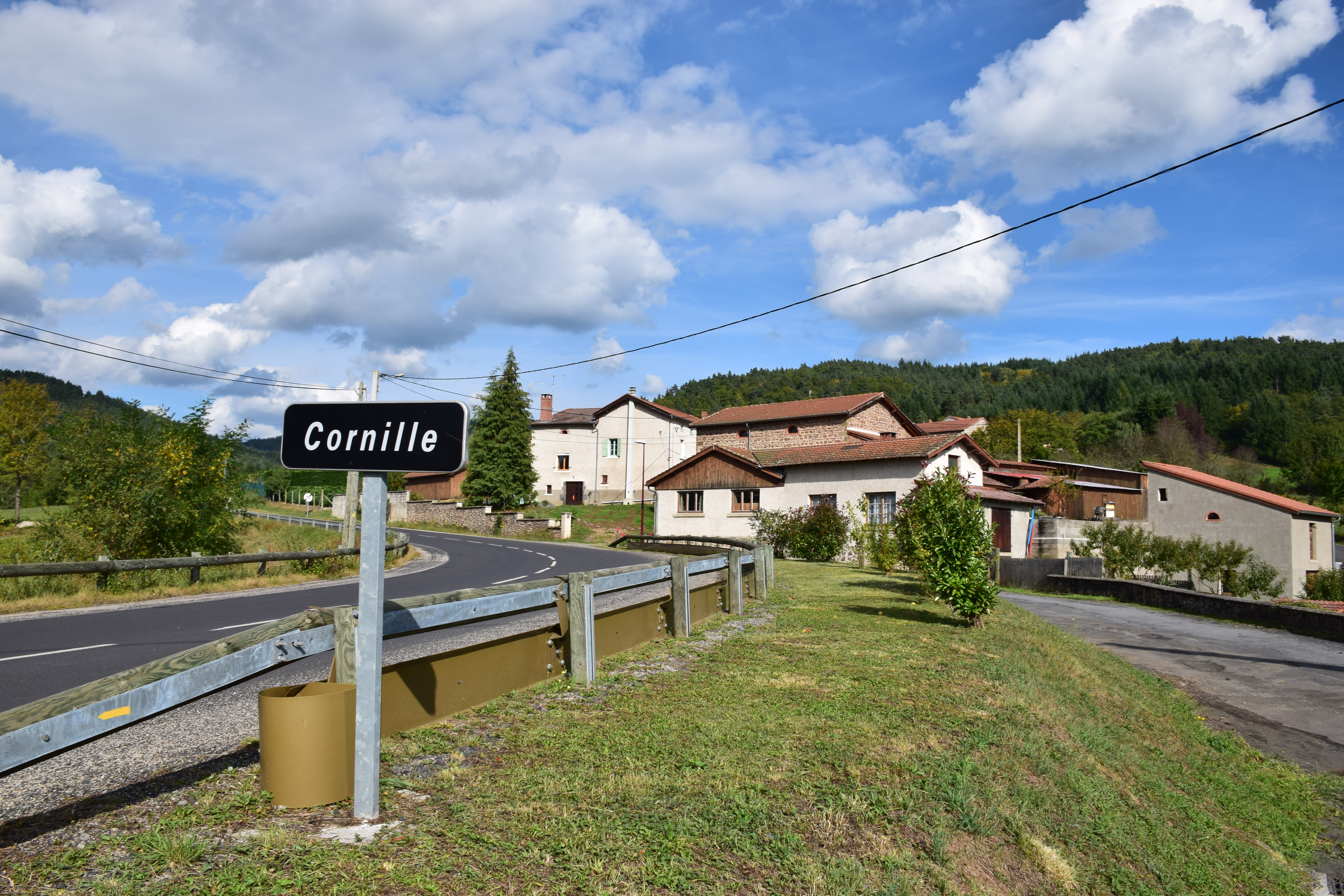
- Cornille
- Location of Javaugues
- Location within France Location within Auvergne-Rhône-Alpes
- Coordinates: 45°17′23″N 3°28′54″E
- Country: France
- Region: Auvergne-Rhône-Alpes
- Department: Haute-Loire
- Arrondissement: Brioude
- Canton: Pays de Lafayette

Government
  - Mayor (2020–2026): Bernard Beaudon
- Area^{1}: 6.98 km^{2} (2.69 sq mi)
- Elevation: 125 m (410 ft)
- Highest elevation: 798 m (2,618 ft)
- Lowest elevation: 459 m (1,506 ft)
- Population (2023): 174
  - Density: 24.9/km^{2} (64.6/sq mi)
- Time zone: UTC+01:00 (CET)
  - Summer (DST): UTC+02:00 (CEST)
- INSEE/Postal code: 43105 /43100
- ^{1} French Land Register data, which excludes lakes, ponds, glaciers > 1 km^{2} (0.386 sq mi or 247 acres) and river estuaries.

Javaugues (French pronunciation: [ʒavoɡ]) is a commune in the Haute-Loire department in south-central France.

== Population ==
Historical population
Year	Pop.	±% p.a.
1968	188	—
1975	155	−2.72%
1982	150	−0.47%
1990	145	−0.42%
1999	157	+0.89%
2007	193	+2.61%
2012	200	+0.72%
2017	189	−1.13%
2023	174	−1.37%
Source: INSEE

== See also ==
- Communes of the Haute-Loire department
