= Saint-Cirgues, Haute-Loire =

Saint-Cirgues
- Commune
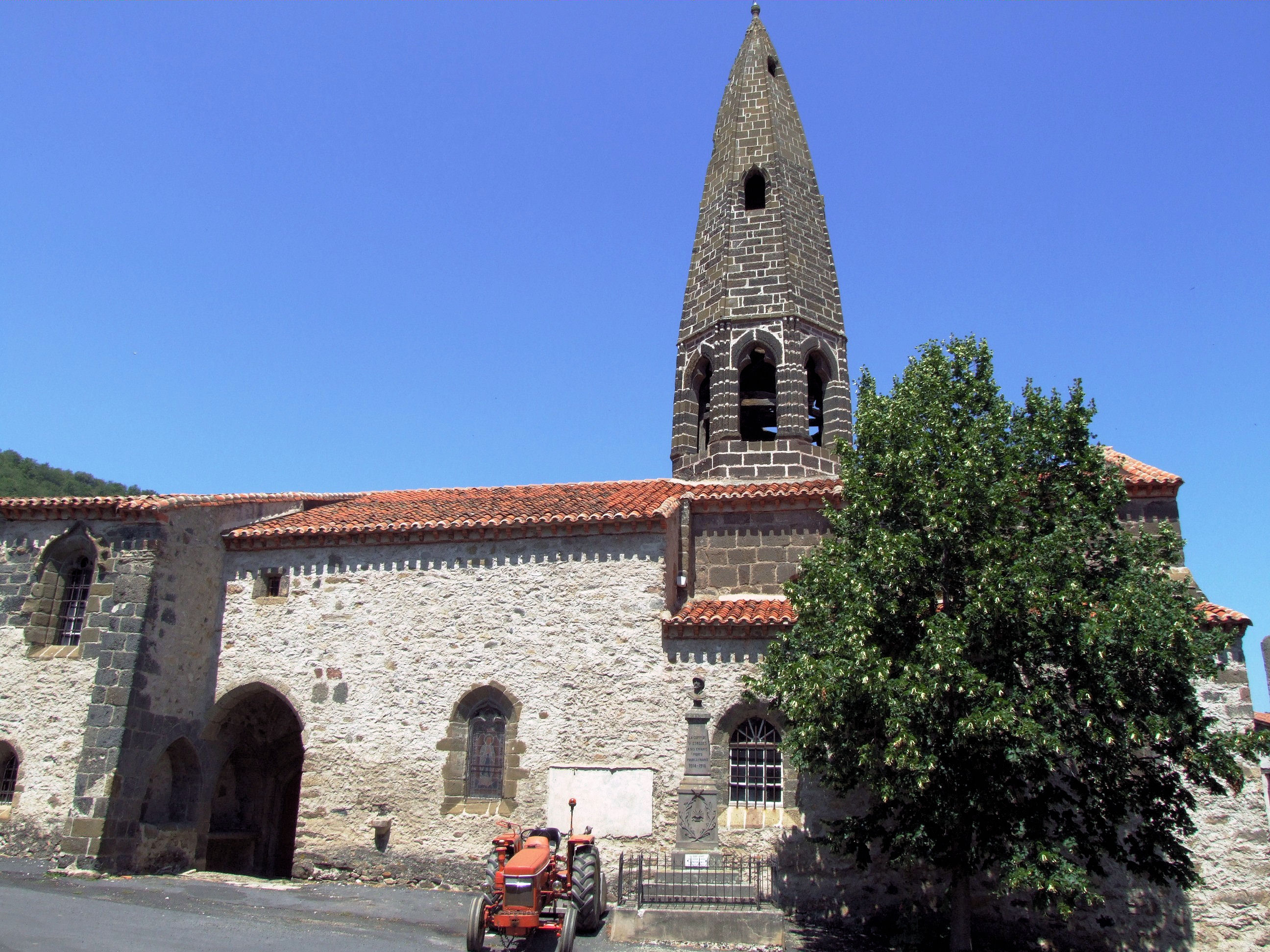
- Location of Saint-Cirgues
- Location within France Location within Auvergne-Rhône-Alpes
- Coordinates: 45°08′44″N 3°24′16″E
- Country: France
- Region: Auvergne-Rhône-Alpes
- Department: Haute-Loire
- Arrondissement: Brioude
- Canton: Pays de Lafayette

Government
  - Mayor (2024–2026): Catherine Goupille
- Area^{1}: 13.62 km^{2} (5.26 sq mi)
- Elevation: 480 m (1,570 ft)
- Highest elevation: 1,033 m (3,389 ft)
- Lowest elevation: 459 m (1,506 ft)
- Population (2023): 165
  - Density: 12.1/km^{2} (31.4/sq mi)
- Time zone: UTC+01:00 (CET)
  - Summer (DST): UTC+02:00 (CEST)
- INSEE/Postal code: 43175 /43380
- ^{1} French Land Register data, which excludes lakes, ponds, glaciers > 1 km^{2} (0.386 sq mi or 247 acres) and river estuaries.

Saint-Cirgues (French pronunciation: [sɛ̃ siʁɡ]; Occitan: Sant Cirgue) is a commune in the Haute-Loire department in south-central France.

== Population ==
Historical population
Year	Pop.	±% p.a.
1968	190	—
1975	191	+0.08%
1982	167	−1.90%
1990	151	−1.25%
1999	147	−0.30%
2007	156	+0.75%
2012	155	−0.13%
2017	163	+1.01%
2023	165	+0.20%
Source: INSEE

== See also ==
- Communes of the Haute-Loire department
