= Canton of Pays de Lafayette =

Coordinates: 45.12°N 3.53°E

The canton of Pays de Lafayette is an administrative division of the Haute-Loire department, south-central France. It was created at the French canton reorganisation which came into effect in March 2015. Its seat is in Mazeyrat-d'Allier.

It consists of the following communes:

1. Ally
2. Arlet
3. Aubazat
4. Blassac
5. Cerzat
6. Chassagnes
7. Chastel
8. Chavaniac-Lafayette
9. Chilhac
10. La Chomette
11. Collat
12. Couteuges
13. Cronce
14. Domeyrat
15. Ferrussac
16. Frugières-le-Pin
17. Javaugues
18. Jax
19. Josat
20. Lavoûte-Chilhac
21. Lubilhac
22. Mazerat-Aurouze
23. Mazeyrat-d'Allier
24. Mercœur
25. Montclard
26. Paulhaguet
27. Saint-Austremoine
28. Saint-Beauzire
29. Saint-Cirgues
30. Saint-Didier-sur-Doulon
31. Sainte-Eugénie-de-Villeneuve
32. Sainte-Marguerite
33. Saint-Georges-d'Aurac
34. Saint-Ilpize
35. Saint-Just-près-Brioude
36. Saint-Préjet-Armandon
37. Saint-Privat-du-Dragon
38. Salzuit
39. Vals-le-Chastel
40. Villeneuve-d'Allier
41. Vissac-Auteyrac
