= Saint-Didier-sur-Doulon =

- Commune
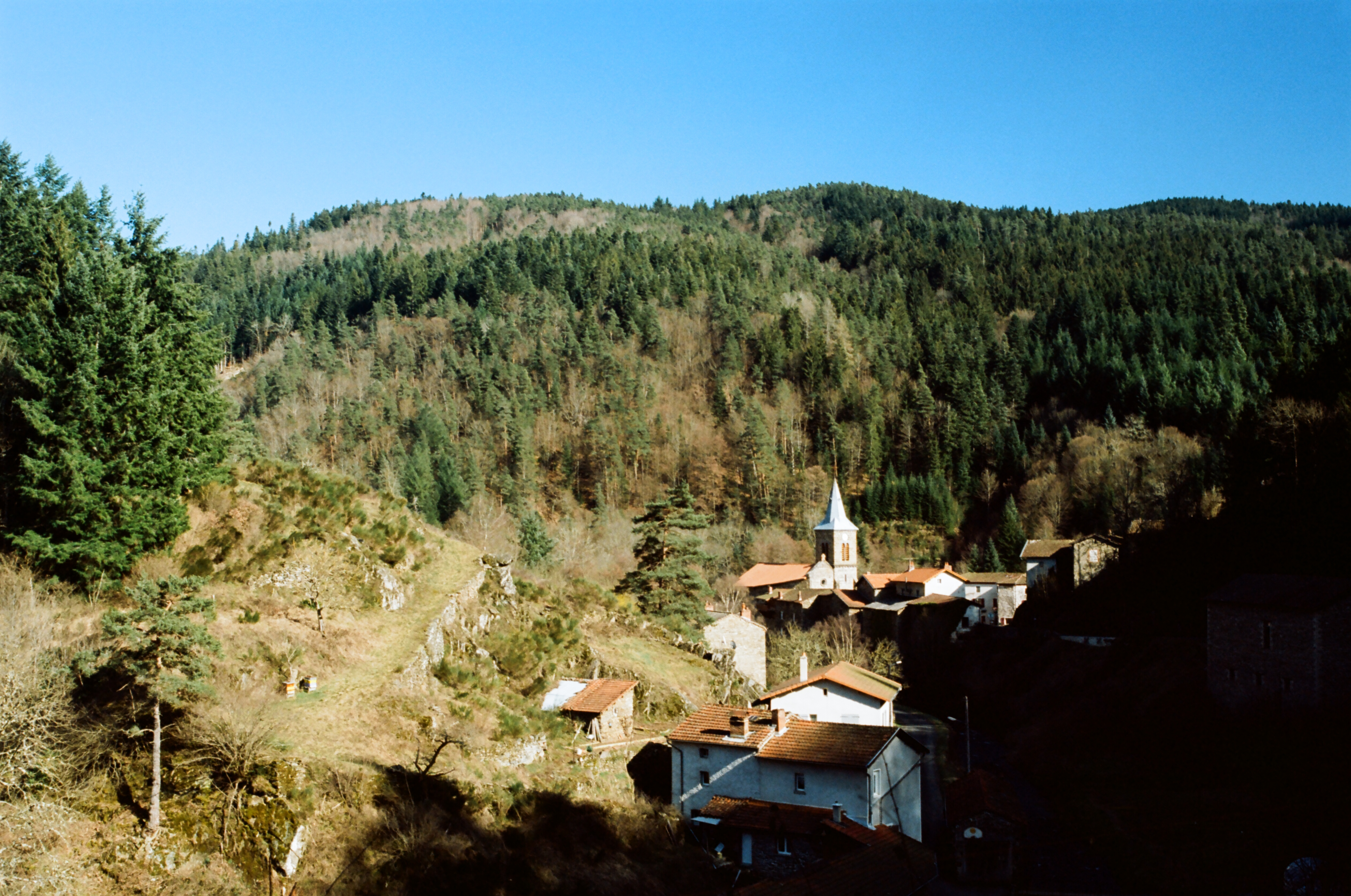
- Location of Saint-Didier-sur-Doulon
- Location within France Location within Auvergne-Rhône-Alpes
- Coordinates: 45°18′05″N 3°32′20″E
- Country: France
- Region: Auvergne-Rhône-Alpes
- Department: Haute-Loire
- Arrondissement: Brioude
- Canton: Pays de Lafayette

Government
  - Mayor (2020–2026): Hervé Romagon
- Area^{1}: 34.14 km^{2} (13.18 sq mi)
- Elevation: 545 m (1,788 ft)
- Highest elevation: 1,089 m (3,573 ft)
- Lowest elevation: 550 m (1,800 ft)
- Population (2023): 197
  - Density: 5.77/km^{2} (14.9/sq mi)
- Time zone: UTC+01:00 (CET)
  - Summer (DST): UTC+02:00 (CEST)
- INSEE/Postal code: 43178 /43440
- ^{1} French Land Register data, which excludes lakes, ponds, glaciers > 1 km^{2} (0.386 sq mi or 247 acres) and river estuaries.

Saint-Didier-sur-Doulon (French pronunciation: [sɛ̃ didje syʁ dulɔ̃]) is a commune in the Haute-Loire department in south-central France.

== Population ==
Historical population
| Year | Pop. | ±% p.a. |
|---|---|---|
| 1968 | 405 | — |
| 1975 | 339 | −2.51% |
| 1982 | 319 | −0.86% |
| 1990 | 274 | −1.88% |
| 1999 | 222 | −2.31% |
| 2007 | 223 | +0.06% |
| 2012 | 204 | −1.77% |
| 2017 | 195 | −0.90% |
| 2023 | 197 | +0.17% |
Source: INSEE

== See also ==
- Communes of the Haute-Loire department
