= Lubilhac =

- Commune
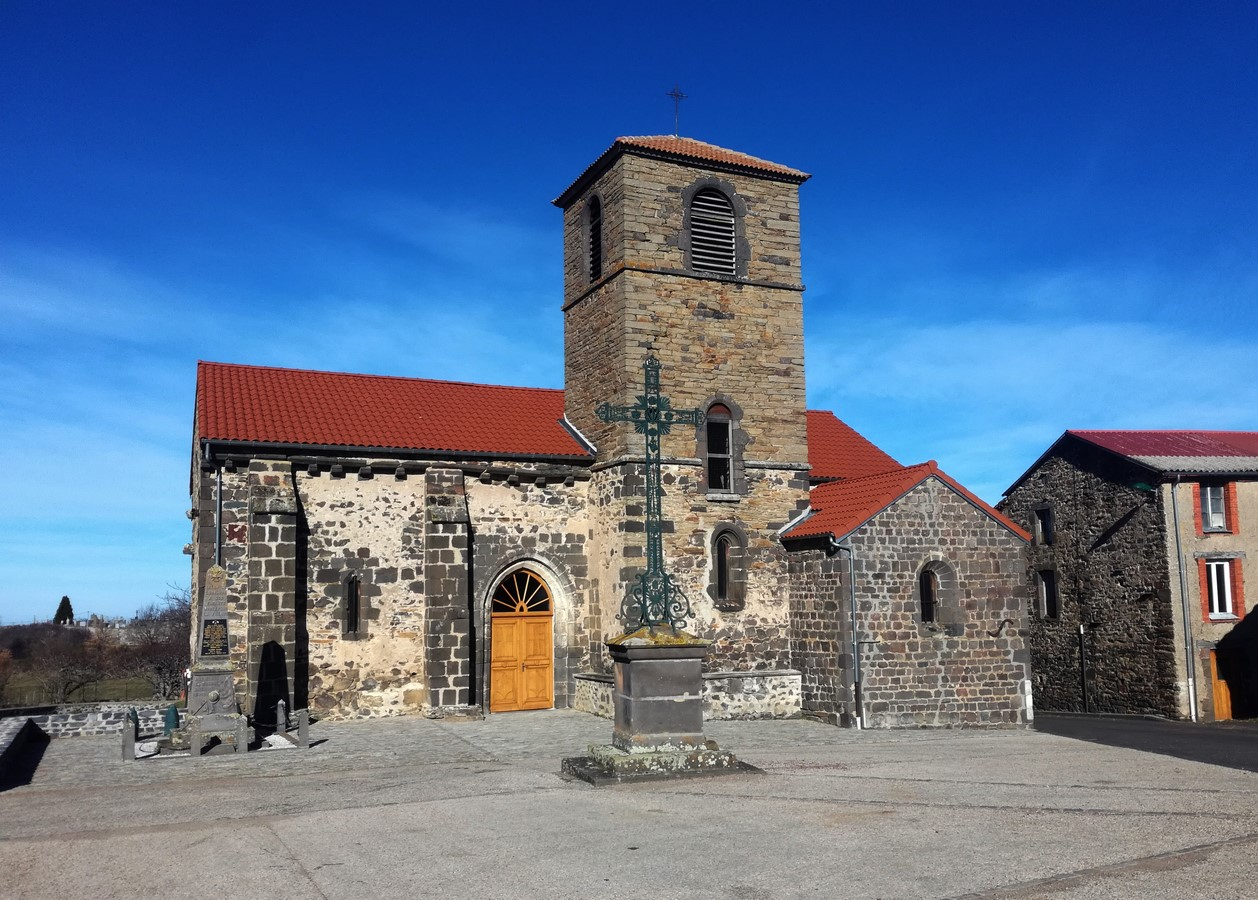
- Location of Lubilhac
- Location within France Location within Auvergne-Rhône-Alpes
- Coordinates: 45°15′12″N 3°14′42″E
- Country: France
- Region: Auvergne-Rhône-Alpes
- Department: Haute-Loire
- Arrondissement: Brioude
- Canton: Pays de Lafayette

Government
  - Mayor (2020–2026): Daniel Cornet
- Area^{1}: 24.09 km^{2} (9.30 sq mi)
- Elevation: 825 m (2,707 ft)
- Highest elevation: 996 m (3,268 ft)
- Lowest elevation: 565 m (1,854 ft)
- Population (2023): 105
  - Density: 4.36/km^{2} (11.3/sq mi)
- Time zone: UTC+01:00 (CET)
  - Summer (DST): UTC+02:00 (CEST)
- INSEE/Postal code: 43125 /43100
- ^{1} French Land Register data, which excludes lakes, ponds, glaciers > 1 km^{2} (0.386 sq mi or 247 acres) and river estuaries.

Lubilhac (French pronunciation: [lybijak]) is a commune in the Haute-Loire department in south-central France.

== Population ==
Historical population
Year	Pop.	±% p.a.
1968	263	—
1975	219	−2.58%
1982	183	−2.53%
1990	165	−1.29%
1999	133	−2.37%
2007	112	−2.13%
2012	106	−1.10%
2017	85	−4.32%
2023	105	+3.58%
Source: INSEE

== See also ==
- Communes of the Haute-Loire department
