= Saint-Préjet-Armandon =

- Commune
- Location of Saint-Préjet-Armandon
- Location within France Location within Auvergne-Rhône-Alpes
- Coordinates: 45°15′20″N 3°32′31″E
- Country: France
- Region: Auvergne-Rhône-Alpes
- Department: Haute-Loire
- Arrondissement: Brioude
- Canton: Pays de Lafayette

Government
  - Mayor (2020–2026): Denis Gaillard
- Area^{1}: 8.47 km^{2} (3.27 sq mi)
- Elevation: 690 m (2,260 ft)
- Highest elevation: 853 m (2,799 ft)
- Lowest elevation: 506 m (1,660 ft)
- Population (2023): 105
  - Density: 12.4/km^{2} (32.1/sq mi)
- Time zone: UTC+01:00 (CET)
  - Summer (DST): UTC+02:00 (CEST)
- INSEE/Postal code: 43219 /43230
- ^{1} French Land Register data, which excludes lakes, ponds, glaciers > 1 km^{2} (0.386 sq mi or 247 acres) and river estuaries.

Saint-Préjet-Armandon is a commune in the Haute-Loire department in south-central France.

== Population ==
Historical population
Year	Pop.	±% p.a.
1968	107	—
1975	105	−0.27%
1982	93	−1.72%
1990	76	−2.49%
1999	93	+2.27%
2007	106	+1.65%
2012	104	−0.38%
2017	107	+0.57%
2023	105	−0.31%
Source: INSEE

== See also ==
- Communes of the Haute-Loire department
