= Saint-Austremoine =

- Commune
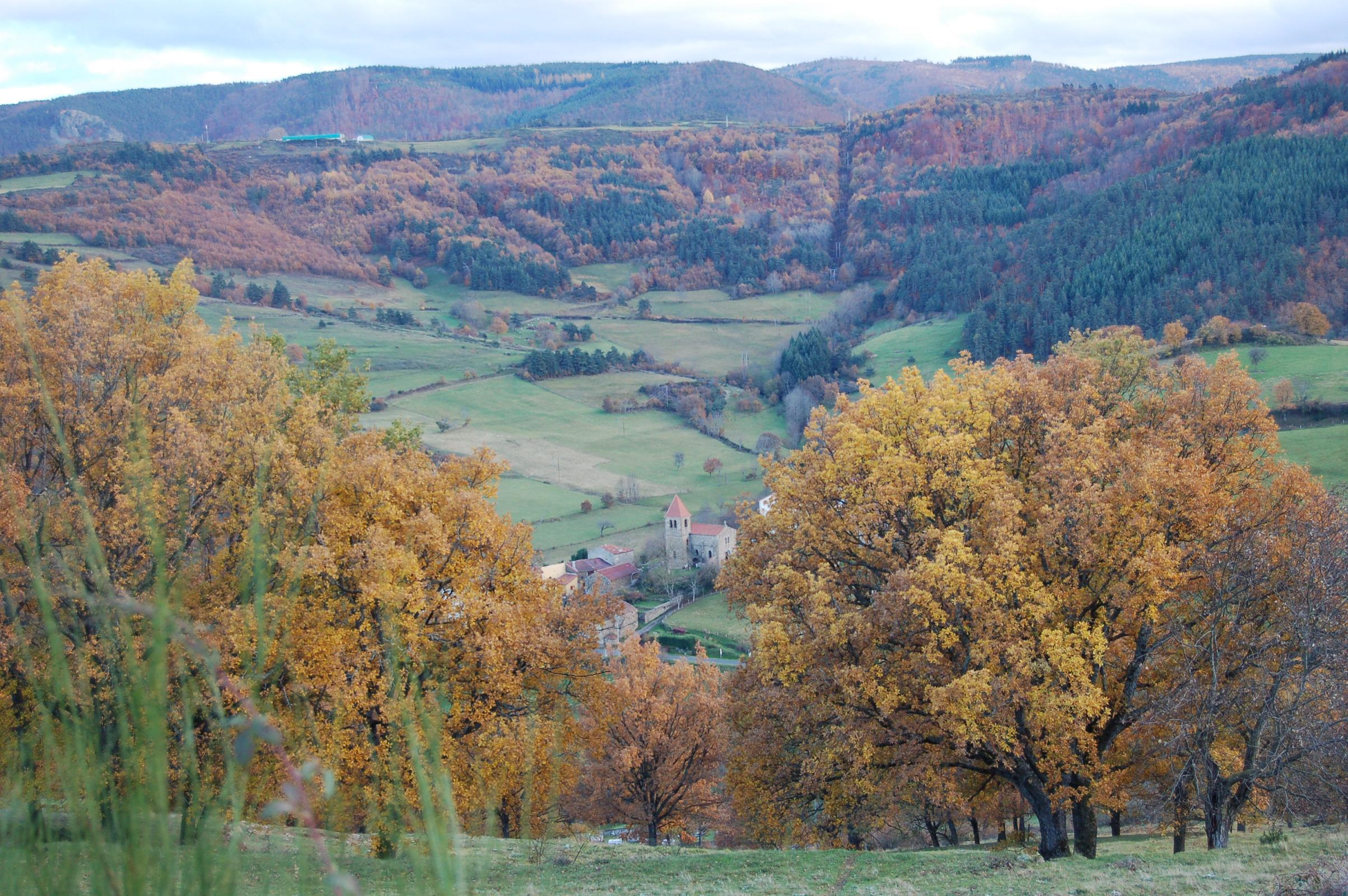
- Location of Saint-Austremoine
- Location within France Location within Auvergne-Rhône-Alpes
- Coordinates: 45°07′15″N 3°22′14″E
- Country: France
- Region: Auvergne-Rhône-Alpes
- Department: Haute-Loire
- Arrondissement: Brioude
- Canton: Pays de Lafayette

Government
  - Mayor (2020–2026): Jean-Paul Fagheon
- Area^{1}: 11.55 km^{2} (4.46 sq mi)
- Elevation: 600 m (2,000 ft)
- Highest elevation: 1,044 m (3,425 ft)
- Lowest elevation: 527 m (1,729 ft)
- Population (2023): 58
  - Density: 5.0/km^{2} (13/sq mi)
- Time zone: UTC+01:00 (CET)
  - Summer (DST): UTC+02:00 (CEST)
- INSEE/Postal code: 43169 /43380
- ^{1} French Land Register data, which excludes lakes, ponds, glaciers > 1 km^{2} (0.386 sq mi or 247 acres) and river estuaries.

Saint-Austremoine (French pronunciation: [sɛ̃.t‿ostʁəmwan]; Occitan: Sent Austremòni) is a commune in the Haute-Loire department in south-central France.

== Population ==
Historical population
Year	Pop.	±% p.a.
1968	119	—
1975	94	−3.31%
1982	87	−1.10%
1990	80	−1.04%
1999	58	−3.51%
2007	52	−1.36%
2012	48	−1.59%
2017	45	−1.28%
2023	58	+4.32%
Source: INSEE

== See also ==
- Communes of the Haute-Loire department
