= Ferrussac =

- Commune
- Location of Ferrussac
- Location within France Location within Auvergne-Rhône-Alpes
- Coordinates: 45°05′37″N 3°24′06″E
- Country: France
- Region: Auvergne-Rhône-Alpes
- Department: Haute-Loire
- Arrondissement: Brioude
- Canton: Pays de Lafayette

Government
  - Mayor (2020–2026): Nathalie Vizade
- Area^{1}: 17.08 km^{2} (6.59 sq mi)
- Elevation: 960 m (3,150 ft)
- Highest elevation: 1,057 m (3,468 ft)
- Lowest elevation: 585 m (1,919 ft)
- Population (2023): 77
  - Density: 4.5/km^{2} (12/sq mi)
- Time zone: UTC+01:00 (CET)
  - Summer (DST): UTC+02:00 (CEST)
- INSEE/Postal code: 43094 /43300
- ^{1} French Land Register data, which excludes lakes, ponds, glaciers > 1 km^{2} (0.386 sq mi or 247 acres) and river estuaries.

Ferrussac (French pronunciation: [fɛʁysak]; Occitan: Ferruçac) is a commune in the Haute-Loire department in south-central France.

== Population ==
Historical population
Year	Pop.	±% p.a.
1968	194	—
1975	147	−3.89%
1982	116	−3.33%
1990	117	+0.11%
1999	92	−2.64%
2007	81	−1.58%
2012	85	+0.97%
2017	81	−0.96%
2023	77	−0.84%
Source: INSEE

== See also ==
- Communes of the Haute-Loire department
