= Arrondissement of Brioude =

Coordinates: 45°17′40″N 3°23′06″E

Brioude
- Arrondissement
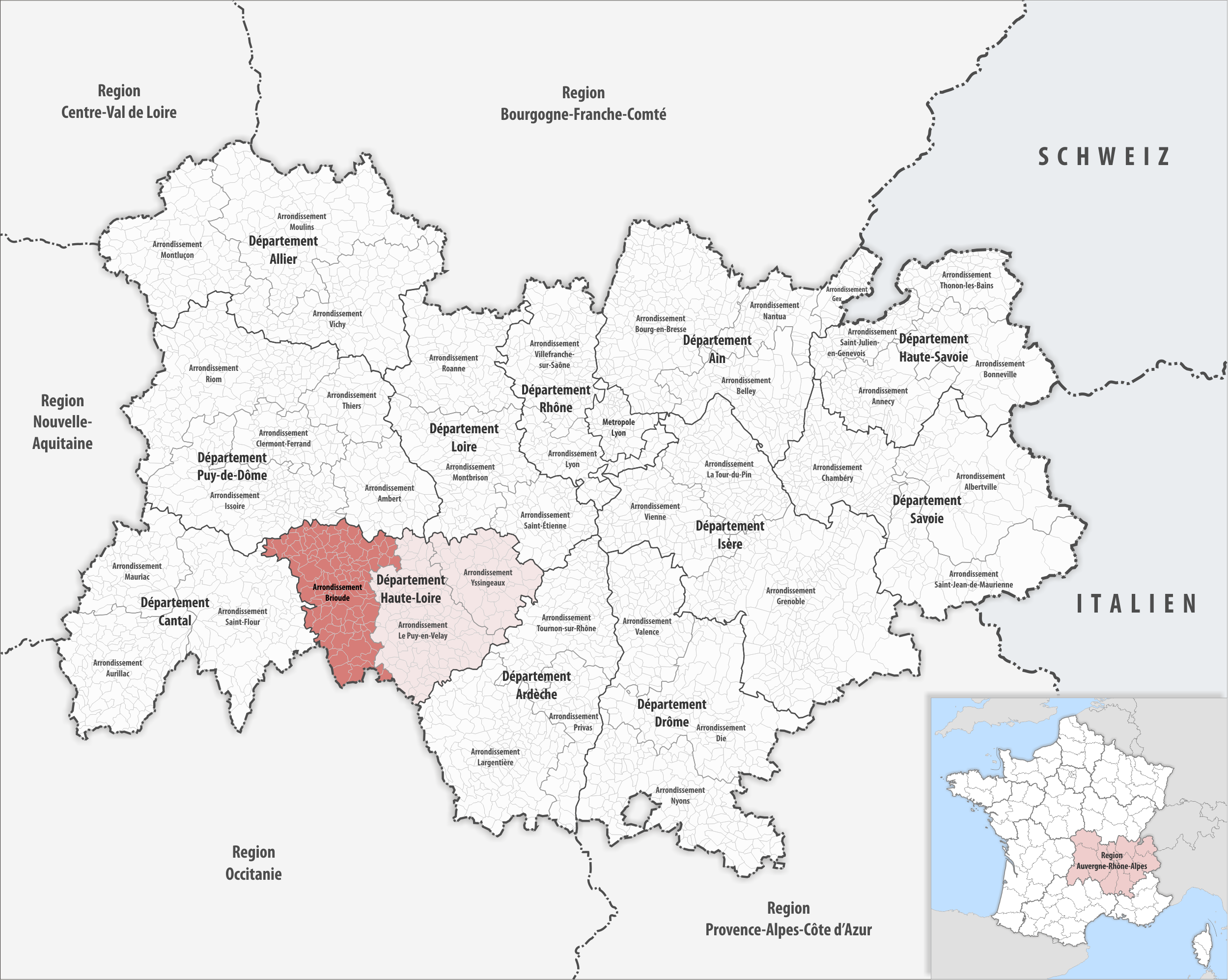
- Location within the region Auvergne-Rhône-Alpes
- Country: France
- Region: Auvergne-Rhône-Alpes
- Department: Haute-Loire
- No. of communes: {{{nbcomm}}}
- Area: 1,886.8 km^{2} (728.5 sq mi)
- Population (2023): 44,915
  - Density: 23.805/km^{2} (61.654/sq mi)
- INSEE code: 431

The Arrondissement of Brioude is an arrondissement of France in the Haute-Loire department in the Auvergne-Rhône-Alpes region. It has 111 communes. Its population is 44,829 (2021), and its area is 1,886.8 km^{2} (728.5 sq mi).

== Composition ==
The communes of the arrondissement of Brioude are:

1. Agnat
2. Ally
3. Arlet
4. Aubazat
5. Autrac
6. Auvers
7. Auzon
8. Azérat
9. Beaumont
10. Berbezit
11. La Besseyre-Saint-Mary
12. Blassac
13. Blesle
14. Bonneval
15. Bournoncle-Saint-Pierre
16. Brioude
17. Cerzat
18. La Chaise-Dieu
19. Chambezon
20. Champagnac-le-Vieux
21. Chanaleilles
22. Chaniat
23. Chanteuges
24. La Chapelle-Geneste
25. Charraix
26. Chassagnes
27. Chassignolles
28. Chastel
29. Chavaniac-Lafayette
30. Chazelles
31. Chilhac
32. La Chomette
33. Cistrières
34. Cohade
35. Collat
36. Connangles
37. Couteuges
38. Cronce
39. Cubelles
40. Desges
41. Domeyrat
42. Espalem
43. Esplantas-Vazeilles
44. Félines
45. Ferrussac
46. Fontannes
47. Frugerès-les-Mines
48. Frugières-le-Pin
49. Grenier-Montgon
50. Grèzes
51. Javaugues
52. Jax
53. Josat
54. Lamothe
55. Langeac
56. Laval-sur-Doulon
57. Lavaudieu
58. Lavoûte-Chilhac
59. Lempdes-sur-Allagnon
60. Léotoing
61. Lorlanges
62. Lubilhac
63. Malvières
64. Mazerat-Aurouze
65. Mazeyrat-d'Allier
66. Mercœur
67. Monistrol-d'Allier
68. Montclard
69. Paulhac
70. Paulhaguet
71. Pébrac
72. Pinols
73. Prades
74. Saint-Arcons-d'Allier
75. Saint-Austremoine
76. Saint-Beauzire
77. Saint-Bérain
78. Saint-Christophe-d'Allier
79. Saint-Cirgues
80. Saint-Didier-sur-Doulon
81. Sainte-Eugénie-de-Villeneuve
82. Sainte-Florine
83. Sainte-Marguerite
84. Saint-Étienne-sur-Blesle
85. Saint-Georges-d'Aurac
86. Saint-Géron
87. Saint-Hilaire
88. Saint-Ilpize
89. Saint-Julien-des-Chazes
90. Saint-Just-près-Brioude
91. Saint-Laurent-Chabreuges
92. Saint-Pal-de-Senouire
93. Saint-Préjet-Armandon
94. Saint-Préjet-d'Allier
95. Saint-Privat-du-Dragon
96. Saint-Vénérand
97. Saint-Vert
98. Salzuit
99. Saugues
100. Sembadel
101. Siaugues-Sainte-Marie
102. Tailhac
103. Thoras
104. Torsiac
105. Vals-le-Chastel
106. Venteuges
107. Vergongheon
108. Vézézoux
109. Vieille-Brioude
110. Villeneuve-d'Allier
111. Vissac-Auteyrac

== History ==
The arrondissement of Brioude was created in 1800. In 2007 it absorbed the canton of Saugues from the arrondissement of Le Puy-en-Velay.

As a result of the reorganisation of the cantons of France which came into effect in 2015, the borders of the cantons are no longer related to the borders of the arrondissements. The cantons of the arrondissement of Brioude were, as of January 2015:

1. Auzon
2. Blesle
3. Brioude-Nord
4. Brioude-Sud
5. La Chaise-Dieu
6. Langeac
7. Lavoûte-Chilhac
8. Paulhaguet
9. Pinols
10. Saugues
