= Mercœur, Haute-Loire =

Mercœur
- Commune
- Location of Mercœur
- Location within France Location within Auvergne-Rhône-Alpes
- Coordinates: 45°11′38″N 3°17′32″E
- Country: France
- Region: Auvergne-Rhône-Alpes
- Department: Haute-Loire
- Arrondissement: Brioude
- Canton: Pays de Lafayette

Government
  - Mayor (2020–2026): Jean-Claude Bages
- Area^{1}: 27.51 km^{2} (10.62 sq mi)
- Elevation: 870 m (2,850 ft)
- Highest elevation: 1,009 m (3,310 ft)
- Lowest elevation: 600 m (2,000 ft)
- Population (2023): 146
  - Density: 5.31/km^{2} (13.7/sq mi)
- Time zone: UTC+01:00 (CET)
  - Summer (DST): UTC+02:00 (CEST)
- INSEE/Postal code: 43133 /43100
- ^{1} French Land Register data, which excludes lakes, ponds, glaciers > 1 km^{2} (0.386 sq mi or 247 acres) and river estuaries.

Mercœur (French pronunciation: [mɛʁkœʁ]; Occitan: Mercuèr) is a commune in the Haute-Loire department in south-central France.

== Population ==
Historical population
| Year | Pop. | ±% p.a. |
|---|---|---|
| 1968 | 229 | — |
| 1975 | 207 | −1.43% |
| 1982 | 201 | −0.42% |
| 1990 | 175 | −1.72% |
| 1999 | 150 | −1.70% |
| 2007 | 132 | −1.59% |
| 2012 | 138 | +0.89% |
| 2017 | 139 | +0.14% |
| 2023 | 146 | +0.82% |
Source: INSEE

== See also ==
- Communes of the Haute-Loire department
