= Chaniat =

- Commune
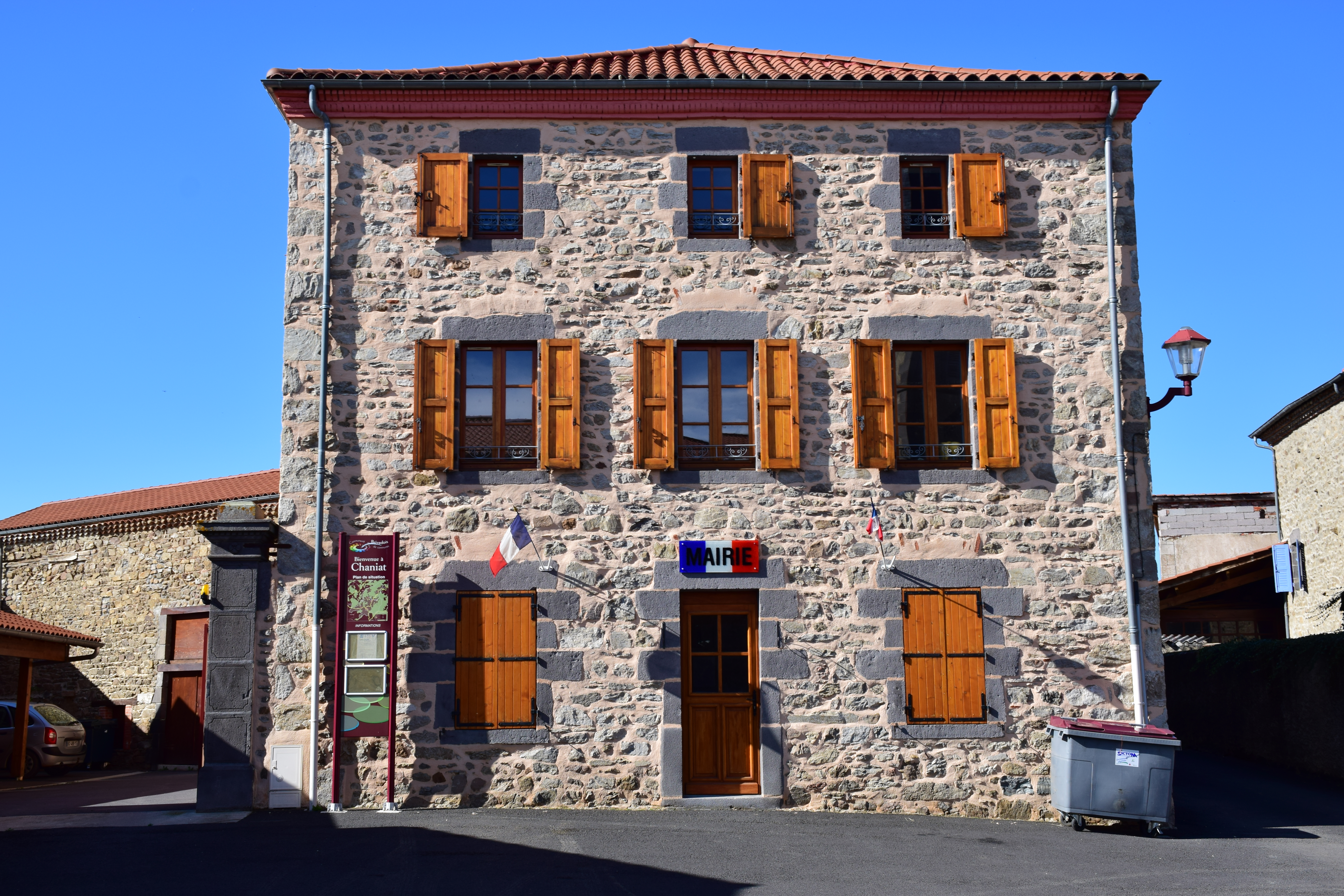
- Town hall
- Location of Chaniat
- Location within France Location within Auvergne-Rhône-Alpes
- Coordinates: 45°19′02″N 3°29′08″E
- Country: France
- Region: Auvergne-Rhône-Alpes
- Department: Haute-Loire
- Arrondissement: Brioude
- Canton: Brioude

Government
  - Mayor (2020–2026): André Poitrasson
- Area^{1}: 13.93 km^{2} (5.38 sq mi)
- Elevation: 649 m (2,129 ft)
- Highest elevation: 869 m (2,851 ft)
- Lowest elevation: 454 m (1,490 ft)
- Population (2023): 164
  - Density: 11.8/km^{2} (30.5/sq mi)
- Time zone: UTC+01:00 (CET)
  - Summer (DST): UTC+02:00 (CEST)
- INSEE/Postal code: 43055 /43100
- ^{1} French Land Register data, which excludes lakes, ponds, glaciers > 1 km^{2} (0.386 sq mi or 247 acres) and river estuaries.

Chaniat (French pronunciation: [ʃanja]) is a commune in the Haute-Loire department in south-central France.

== Population ==
Historical population
Year	Pop.	±% p.a.
1968	181	—
1975	183	+0.16%
1982	172	−0.88%
1990	153	−1.45%
1999	133	−1.54%
2007	160	+2.34%
2012	159	−0.13%
2017	172	+1.58%
2023	164	−0.79%
Source: INSEE

== See also ==
- Communes of the Haute-Loire department
