= Chambezon =

- Commune
- Location of Chambezon
- Location within France Location within Auvergne-Rhône-Alpes
- Coordinates: 45°22′49″N 3°14′37″E
- Country: France
- Region: Auvergne-Rhône-Alpes
- Department: Haute-Loire
- Arrondissement: Brioude
- Canton: Sainte-Florine

Government
  - Mayor (2020–2026): Laurent Trémouillère
- Area^{1}: 5.09 km^{2} (1.97 sq mi)
- Elevation: 550 m (1,800 ft)
- Highest elevation: 720 m (2,360 ft)
- Lowest elevation: 433 m (1,421 ft)
- Population (2023): 125
  - Density: 24.6/km^{2} (63.6/sq mi)
- Time zone: UTC+01:00 (CET)
  - Summer (DST): UTC+02:00 (CEST)
- INSEE/Postal code: 43050 /43410
- ^{1} French Land Register data, which excludes lakes, ponds, glaciers > 1 km^{2} (0.386 sq mi or 247 acres) and river estuaries.

Chambezon (French pronunciation: [ʃɑ̃bəzɔ̃]; Occitan: Chambeçon) is a commune in the Haute-Loire department in south-central France.

== Population ==
Historical population
Year	Pop.	±% p.a.
1968	100	—
1975	85	−2.29%
1982	71	−2.54%
1990	80	+1.50%
1999	94	+1.81%
2007	95	+0.13%
2012	98	+0.62%
2017	116	+3.43%
2023	125	+1.25%
Source: INSEE

== See also ==
- Communes of the Haute-Loire department
