= Cronce =

- Commune
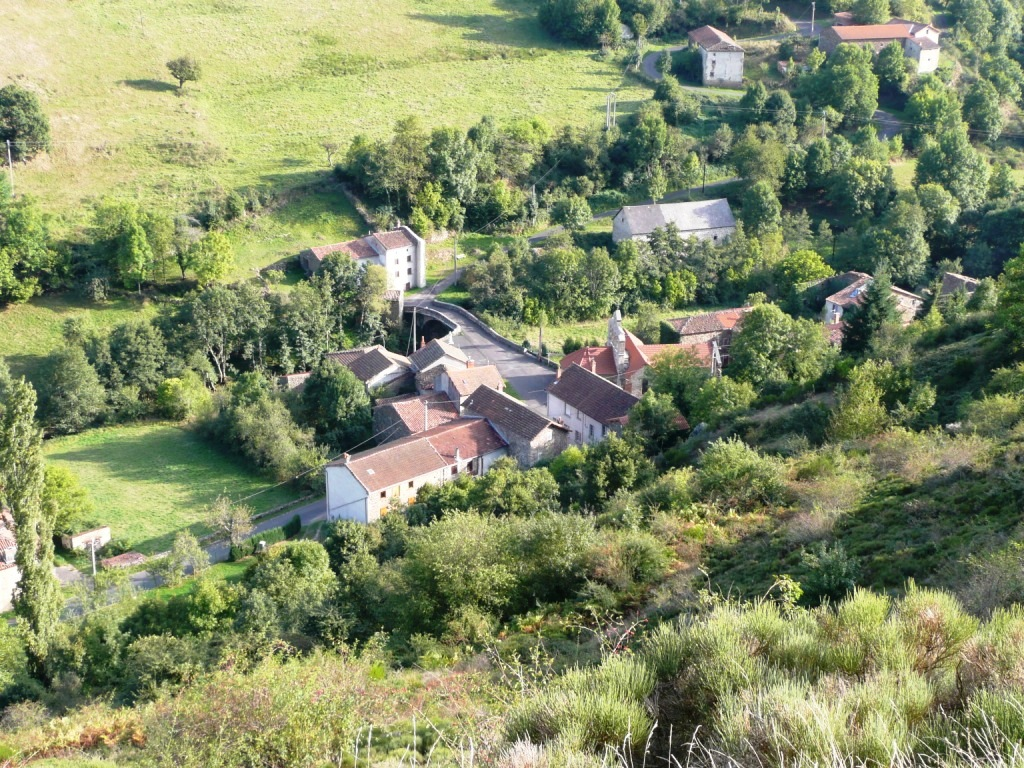
- Location of Cronce
- Location within France Location within Auvergne-Rhône-Alpes
- Coordinates: 45°05′36″N 3°21′41″E
- Country: France
- Region: Auvergne-Rhône-Alpes
- Department: Haute-Loire
- Arrondissement: Brioude
- Canton: Pays de Lafayette

Government
  - Mayor (2020–2026): Gisèle Raspail
- Area^{1}: 16.15 km^{2} (6.24 sq mi)
- Elevation: 710 m (2,330 ft)
- Highest elevation: 1,173 m (3,848 ft)
- Lowest elevation: 623 m (2,044 ft)
- Population (2023): 71
  - Density: 4.4/km^{2} (11/sq mi)
- Time zone: UTC+01:00 (CET)
  - Summer (DST): UTC+02:00 (CEST)
- INSEE/Postal code: 43082 /43300
- ^{1} French Land Register data, which excludes lakes, ponds, glaciers > 1 km^{2} (0.386 sq mi or 247 acres) and river estuaries.

Cronce (French pronunciation: [kʁɔ̃s]) is a commune in the Haute-Loire department in south-central France.

== Population ==
Historical population
Year	Pop.	±% p.a.
1968	119	—
1975	110	−1.12%
1982	114	+0.51%
1990	110	−0.45%
1999	100	−1.05%
2007	82	−2.45%
2012	86	+0.96%
2017	75	−2.70%
2023	71	−0.91%
Source: INSEE

== See also ==
- Communes of the Haute-Loire department
