= Vissac-Auteyrac =

- Commune
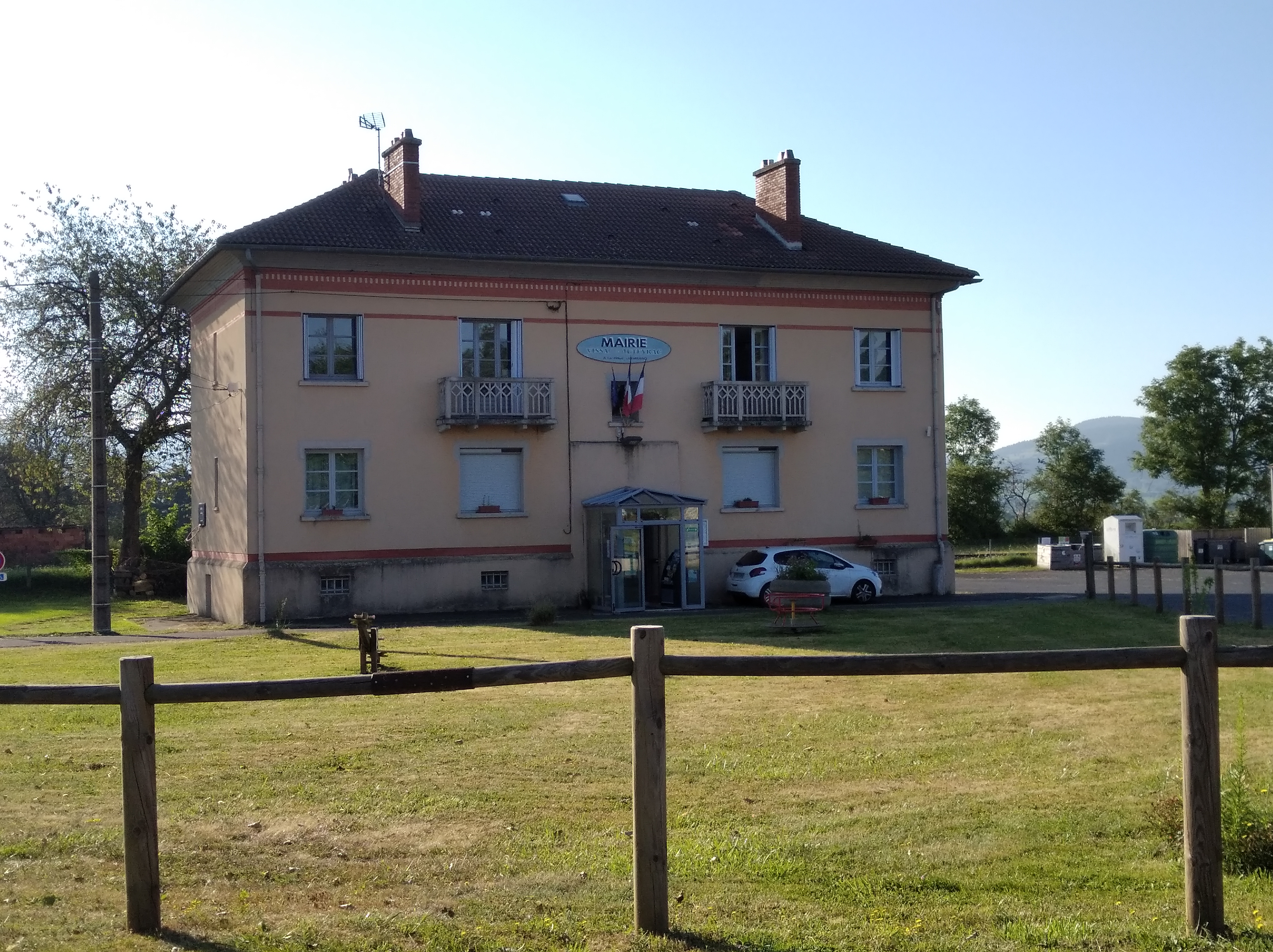
- Vissac-Auteyrac Town hall
- Location of Vissac-Auteyrac
- Location within France Location within Auvergne-Rhône-Alpes
- Coordinates: 45°07′22″N 3°36′37″E
- Country: France
- Region: Auvergne-Rhône-Alpes
- Department: Haute-Loire
- Arrondissement: Brioude
- Canton: Pays de Lafayette

Government
  - Mayor (2020–2026): Michèle Malfant
- Area^{1}: 17.1 km^{2} (6.6 sq mi)
- Elevation: 838 m (2,749 ft)
- Highest elevation: 1,229 m (4,032 ft)
- Lowest elevation: 678 m (2,224 ft)
- Population (2023): 302
  - Density: 17.7/km^{2} (45.7/sq mi)
- Time zone: UTC+01:00 (CET)
  - Summer (DST): UTC+02:00 (CEST)
- INSEE/Postal code: 43013 /43300
- ^{1} French Land Register data, which excludes lakes, ponds, glaciers > 1 km^{2} (0.386 sq mi or 247 acres) and river estuaries.

Vissac-Auteyrac (French pronunciation: [visak oteʁak]; Occitan: Vissac e Auteirac) is a commune in the Haute-Loire department in south-central France.

== Population ==
Historical population
Year	Pop.	±% p.a.
1968	461	—
1975	404	−1.87%
1982	379	−0.91%
1990	284	−3.54%
1999	299	+0.57%
2007	327	+1.13%
2012	336	+0.54%
2017	327	−0.54%
2023	302	−1.32%
Source: INSEE

== See also ==
- Communes of the Haute-Loire department
