= Chastel, Haute-Loire =

Chastel
- Commune
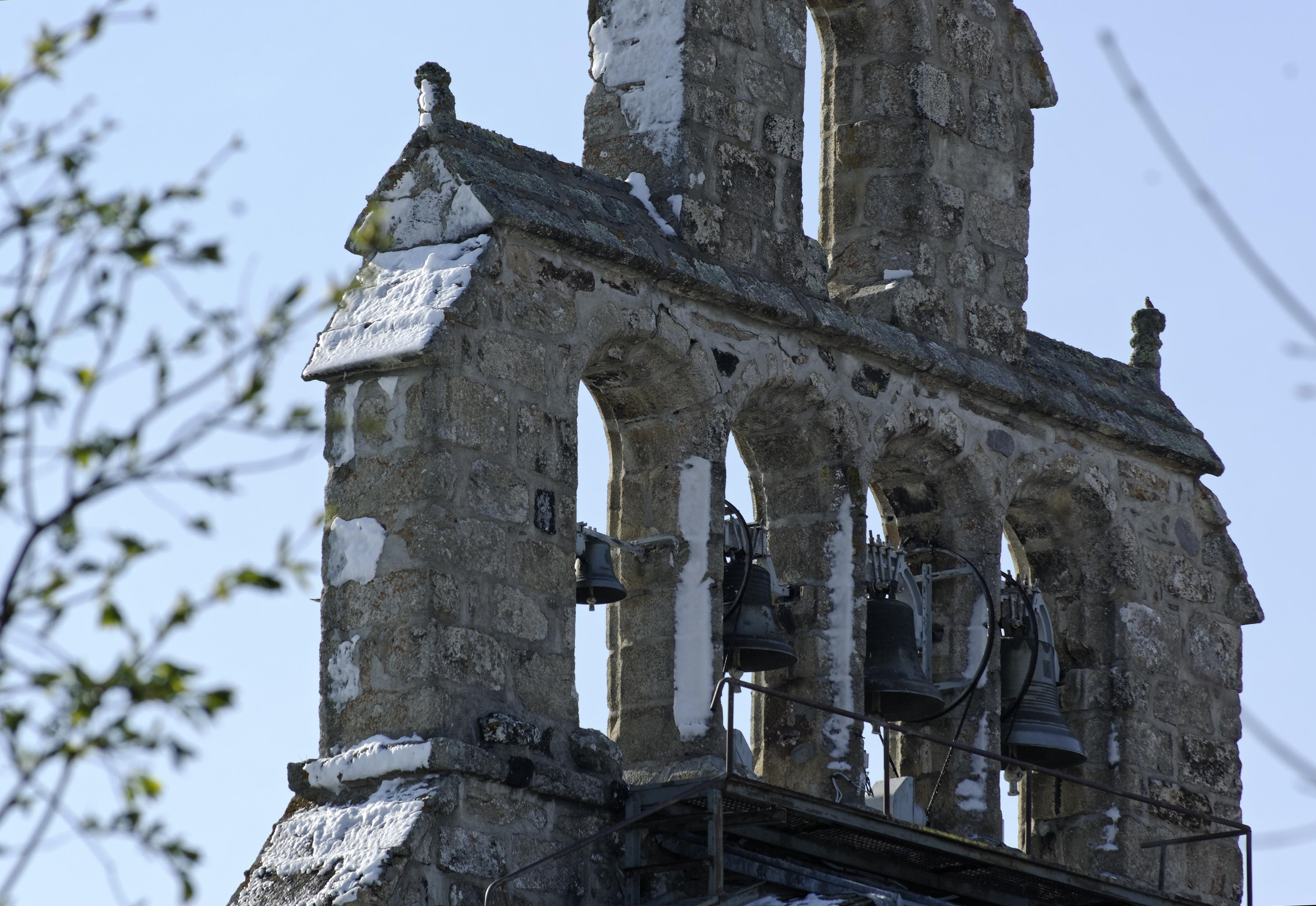
- Location of Chastel
- Location within France Location within Auvergne-Rhône-Alpes
- Coordinates: 45°05′03″N 3°19′25″E
- Country: France
- Region: Auvergne-Rhône-Alpes
- Department: Haute-Loire
- Arrondissement: Brioude
- Canton: Pays de Lafayette

Government
  - Mayor (2023–2026): Jean-Michel Lacroix
- Area^{1}: 27.69 km^{2} (10.69 sq mi)
- Elevation: 900 m (3,000 ft)
- Highest elevation: 1,359 m (4,459 ft)
- Lowest elevation: 711 m (2,333 ft)
- Population (2023): 122
  - Density: 4.41/km^{2} (11.4/sq mi)
- Time zone: UTC+01:00 (CET)
  - Summer (DST): UTC+02:00 (CEST)
- INSEE/Postal code: 43065 /43300
- ^{1} French Land Register data, which excludes lakes, ponds, glaciers > 1 km^{2} (0.386 sq mi or 247 acres) and river estuaries.

Chastel (French pronunciation: [ʃastɛl]) is a commune in the Haute-Loire department in south-central France.

== Population ==
Historical population
| Year | Pop. | ±% p.a. |
|---|---|---|
| 1968 | 347 | — |
| 1975 | 320 | −1.15% |
| 1982 | 274 | −2.19% |
| 1990 | 216 | −2.93% |
| 1999 | 162 | −3.15% |
| 2007 | 138 | −1.98% |
| 2012 | 139 | +0.14% |
| 2017 | 129 | −1.48% |
| 2023 | 122 | −0.93% |
Source: INSEE

== See also ==
- Communes of the Haute-Loire department
