= Couteuges =

- Commune
- Location of Couteuges
- Location within France Location within Auvergne-Rhône-Alpes
- Coordinates: 45°11′19″N 3°29′55″E
- Country: France
- Region: Auvergne-Rhône-Alpes
- Department: Haute-Loire
- Arrondissement: Brioude
- Canton: Pays de Lafayette

Government
  - Mayor (2020–2026): Alain Besson
- Area^{1}: 10.34 km^{2} (3.99 sq mi)
- Elevation: 525 m (1,722 ft)
- Highest elevation: 722 m (2,369 ft)
- Lowest elevation: 520 m (1,710 ft)
- Population (2023): 286
  - Density: 27.7/km^{2} (71.6/sq mi)
- Time zone: UTC+01:00 (CET)
  - Summer (DST): UTC+02:00 (CEST)
- INSEE/Postal code: 43079 /43230
- ^{1} French Land Register data, which excludes lakes, ponds, glaciers > 1 km^{2} (0.386 sq mi or 247 acres) and river estuaries.

Couteuges (French pronunciation: [kutøʒ]; Occitan: Coteujas) is a commune in the Haute-Loire department in south-central France.

== Population ==
Historical population
Year	Pop.	±% p.a.
1968	338	—
1975	342	+0.17%
1982	315	−1.17%
1990	313	−0.08%
1999	262	−1.96%
2007	315	+2.33%
2012	304	−0.71%
2017	301	−0.20%
2023	286	−0.85%
Source: INSEE

== See also ==
- Communes of the Haute-Loire department
