= Montclard =

- Commune
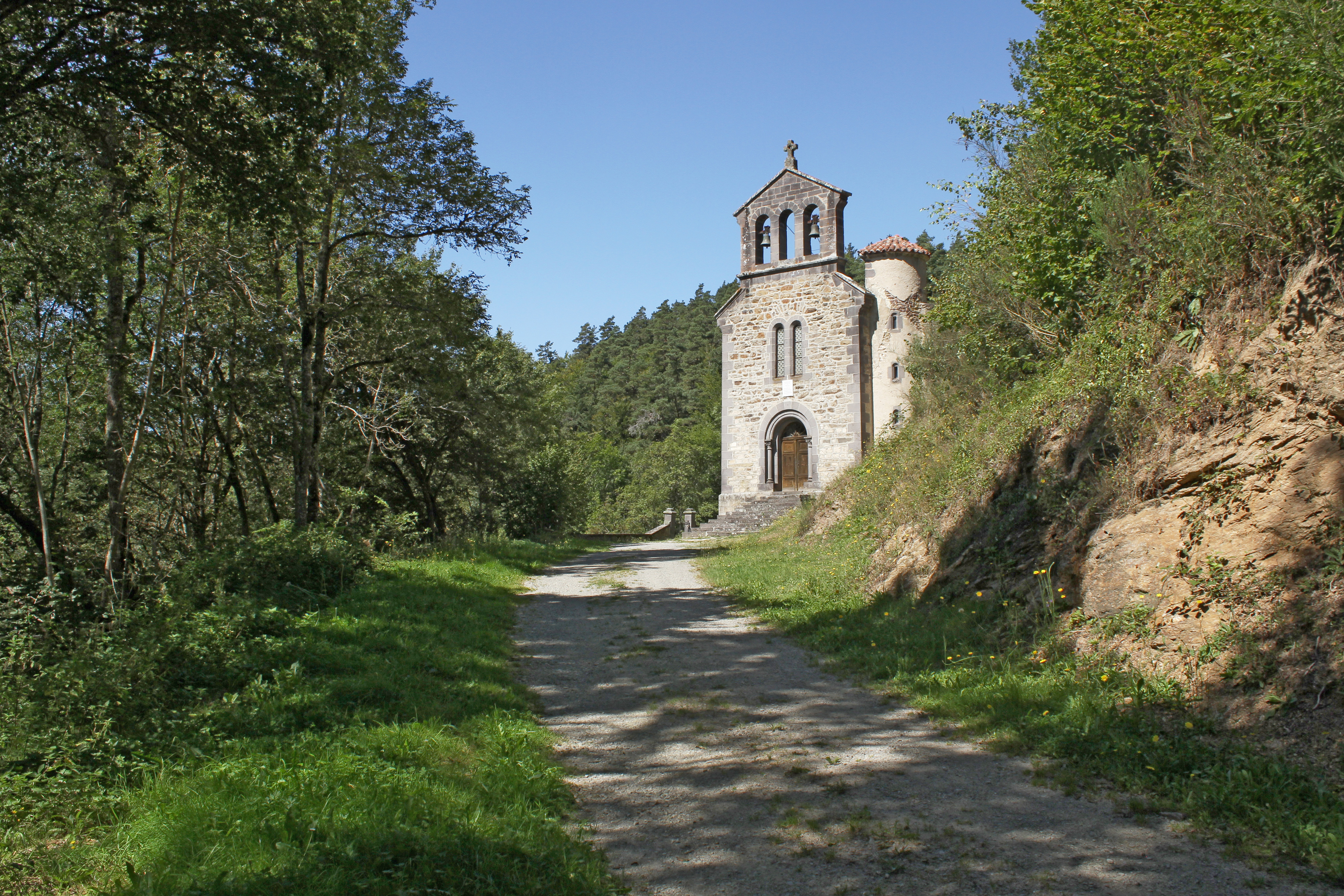
- Location of Montclard
- Location within France Location within Auvergne-Rhône-Alpes
- Coordinates: 45°16′09″N 3°33′58″E
- Country: France
- Region: Auvergne-Rhône-Alpes
- Department: Haute-Loire
- Arrondissement: Brioude
- Canton: Pays de Lafayette

Government
  - Mayor (2020–2026): Nicolas Vigier
- Area^{1}: 9.58 km^{2} (3.70 sq mi)
- Elevation: 700 m (2,300 ft)
- Highest elevation: 1,204 m (3,950 ft)
- Lowest elevation: 640 m (2,100 ft)
- Population (2023): 52
  - Density: 5.4/km^{2} (14/sq mi)
- Time zone: UTC+01:00 (CET)
  - Summer (DST): UTC+02:00 (CEST)
- INSEE/Postal code: 43139 /43230
- ^{1} French Land Register data, which excludes lakes, ponds, glaciers > 1 km^{2} (0.386 sq mi or 247 acres) and river estuaries.

Montclard (French pronunciation: [mɔ̃klaʁ]) is a commune in the Haute-Loire department in south-central France.

== Population ==
Historical population
Year	Pop.	±% p.a.
1968	67	—
1975	70	+0.63%
1982	67	−0.62%
1990	67	+0.00%
1999	65	−0.34%
2007	62	−0.59%
2012	62	+0.00%
2017	55	−2.37%
2023	52	−0.93%
Source: INSEE

== See also ==
- Communes of the Haute-Loire department
