= Frugerès-les-Mines =

- Commune
- Location of Frugerès-les-Mines
- Location within France Location within Auvergne-Rhône-Alpes
- Coordinates: 45°23′14″N 3°18′27″E
- Country: France
- Region: Auvergne-Rhône-Alpes
- Department: Haute-Loire
- Arrondissement: Brioude
- Canton: Sainte-Florine

Government
  - Mayor (2020–2026): André Ollagnier
- Area^{1}: 1.08 km^{2} (0.42 sq mi)
- Highest elevation: 480 m (1,570 ft)
- Lowest elevation: 414 m (1,358 ft)
- Population (2023): 548
  - Density: 507/km^{2} (1,310/sq mi)
- Time zone: UTC+01:00 (CET)
  - Summer (DST): UTC+02:00 (CEST)
- INSEE/Postal code: 43099 /43250
- ^{1} French Land Register data, which excludes lakes, ponds, glaciers > 1 km^{2} (0.386 sq mi or 247 acres) and river estuaries.

Frugerès-les-Mines (also Frugères-les-Mines, French pronunciation: [fʁyʒɛʁ le min]; Occitan: Frogueiret) is a commune in the Haute-Loire department in south-central France.

== Demography ==
Historical population
Year	Pop.	±% p.a.
1968	524	—
1975	564	+1.06%
1982	647	+1.98%
1990	567	−1.64%
1999	498	−1.43%
2007	519	+0.52%
2012	527	+0.31%
2017	557	+1.11%
2023	548	−0.27%
Source: INSEE

== See also ==
- Communes of the Haute-Loire department
