= Chilhac =

- Commune
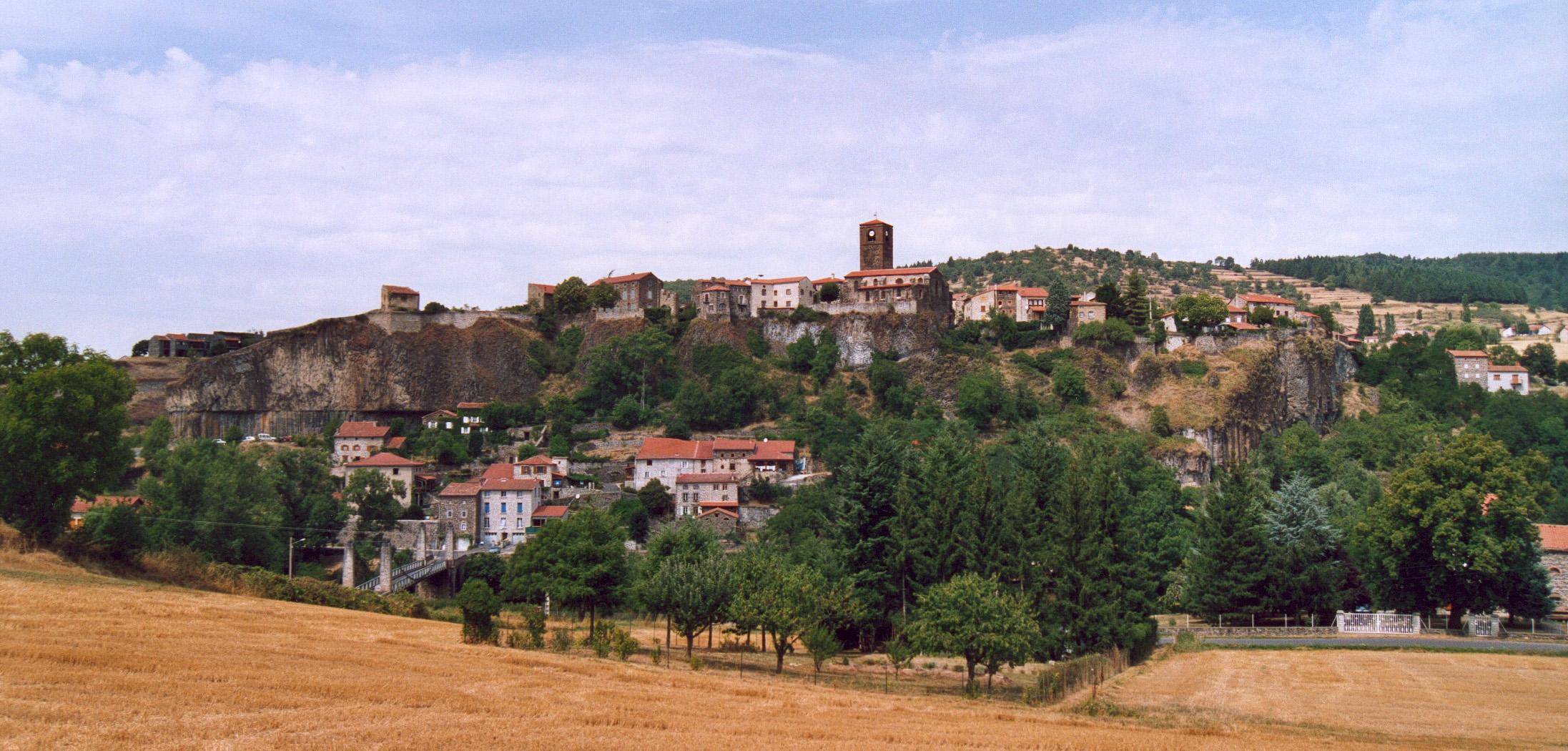
- Location of Chilhac
- Location within France Location within Auvergne-Rhône-Alpes
- Coordinates: 45°09′27″N 3°26′18″E
- Country: France
- Region: Auvergne-Rhône-Alpes
- Department: Haute-Loire
- Arrondissement: Brioude
- Canton: Pays de Lafayette

Government
  - Mayor (2020–2026): Michel Beckert
- Area^{1}: 4.11 km^{2} (1.59 sq mi)
- Elevation: 570 m (1,870 ft)
- Highest elevation: 780 m (2,560 ft)
- Lowest elevation: 468 m (1,535 ft)
- Population (2023): 176
  - Density: 42.8/km^{2} (111/sq mi)
- Time zone: UTC+01:00 (CET)
  - Summer (DST): UTC+02:00 (CEST)
- INSEE/Postal code: 43070 /43380
- ^{1} French Land Register data, which excludes lakes, ponds, glaciers > 1 km^{2} (0.386 sq mi or 247 acres) and river estuaries.

Chilhac (French pronunciation: [ʃijak]) is a commune in the Haute-Loire department in south-central France.

== Population ==
Historical population
Year	Pop.	±% p.a.
1968	206	—
1975	183	−1.68%
1982	175	−0.64%
1990	181	+0.42%
1999	187	+0.36%
2007	198	+0.72%
2012	195	−0.30%
2017	181	−1.48%
2023	176	−0.47%
Source: INSEE

== See also ==
- Communes of the Haute-Loire department
