= Jax, Haute-Loire =

Jax
- Commune
- Location of Jax
- Location within France Location within Auvergne-Rhône-Alpes
- Coordinates: 45°10′09″N 3°37′08″E
- Country: France
- Region: Auvergne-Rhône-Alpes
- Department: Haute-Loire
- Arrondissement: Brioude
- Canton: Pays de Lafayette

Government
  - Mayor (2020–2026): Thierry Grimaldi
- Area^{1}: 11.93 km^{2} (4.61 sq mi)
- Elevation: 1,010 m (3,310 ft)
- Highest elevation: 1,150 m (3,770 ft)
- Lowest elevation: 646 m (2,119 ft)
- Population (2023): 145
  - Density: 12.2/km^{2} (31.5/sq mi)
- Time zone: UTC+01:00 (CET)
  - Summer (DST): UTC+02:00 (CEST)
- INSEE/Postal code: 43106 /43230
- ^{1} French Land Register data, which excludes lakes, ponds, glaciers > 1 km^{2} (0.386 sq mi or 247 acres) and river estuaries.

Jax is a commune in the department of Haute-Loire in south-central France.

The commune includes a small village, Chastenuel, which has a riding school.

== Population ==
Historical population
Year	Pop.	±% p.a.
1968	162	—
1975	123	−3.86%
1982	107	−1.97%
1990	131	+2.56%
1999	131	+0.00%
2007	132	+0.10%
2012	139	+1.04%
2017	147	+1.13%
2023	145	−0.23%
Source: INSEE

== See also ==
- Communes of the Haute-Loire department
