= Arlet =

- Commune
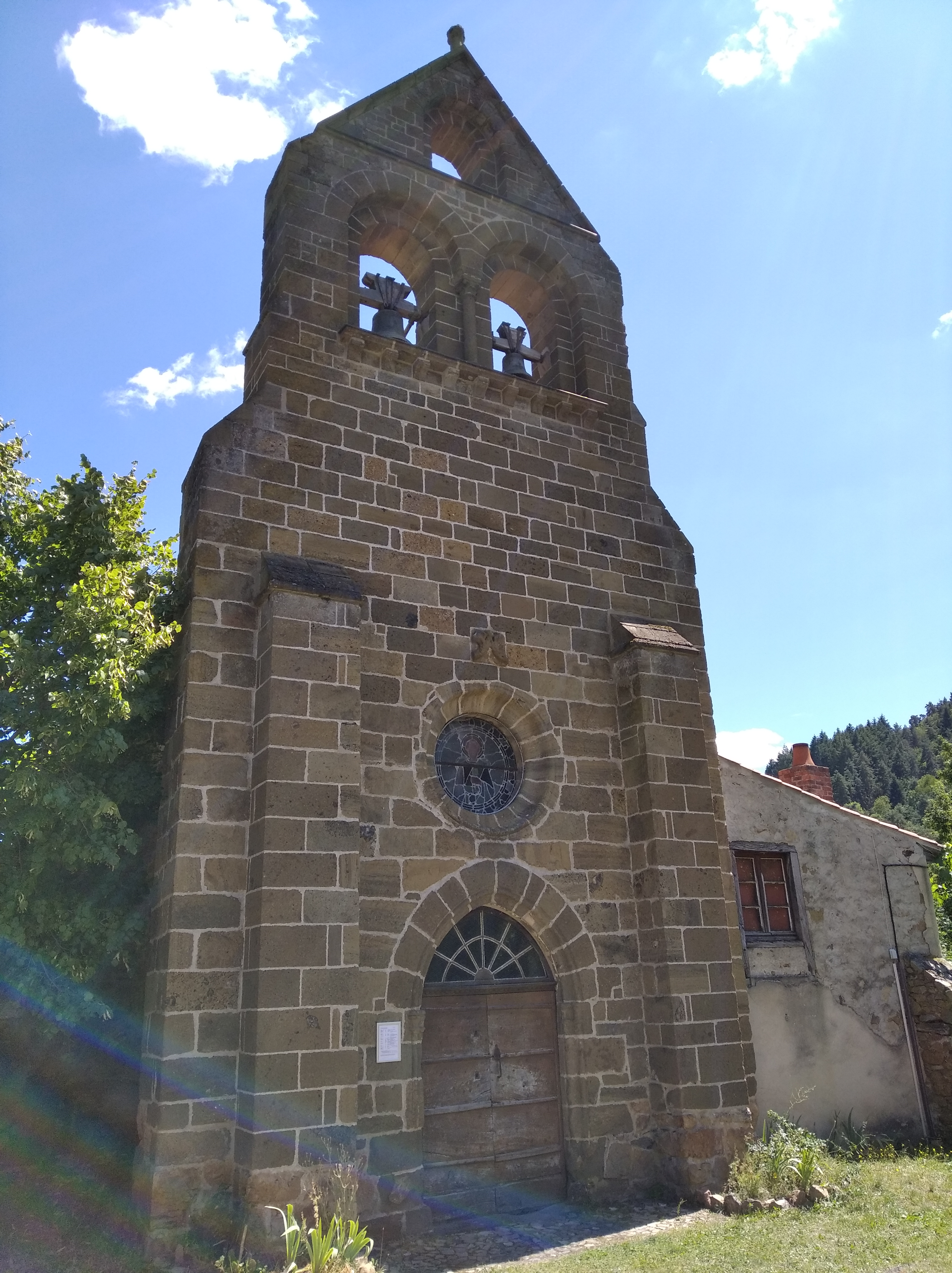
- Church of Saint Peter in Arlet
- Location of Arlet
- Location within France Location within Auvergne-Rhône-Alpes
- Coordinates: 45°07′N 3°25′E
- Country: France
- Region: Auvergne-Rhône-Alpes
- Department: Haute-Loire
- Arrondissement: Brioude
- Canton: Pays de Lafayette
- Intercommunality: Rives du Haut Allier

Government
  - Mayor (2020–2026): Séverine Eynard
- Area^{1}: 5.78 km^{2} (2.23 sq mi)
- Elevation: 580 m (1,900 ft)
- Highest elevation: 933 m (3,061 ft)
- Lowest elevation: 545 m (1,788 ft)
- Population (2023): 24
  - Density: 4.2/km^{2} (11/sq mi)
- Time zone: UTC+01:00 (CET)
  - Summer (DST): UTC+02:00 (CEST)
- INSEE/Postal code: 43009 /43380
- ^{1} French Land Register data, which excludes lakes, ponds, glaciers > 1 km^{2} (0.386 sq mi or 247 acres) and river estuaries.

Arlet (French pronunciation: [aʁlɛ]; Occitan: Arlet) is a commune in the Haute-Loire department in south-central France.

== Population ==
Historical population
Year	Pop.	±% p.a.
1968	42	—
1975	31	−4.25%
1982	28	−1.44%
1990	25	−1.41%
1999	20	−2.45%
2007	21	+0.61%
2012	24	+2.71%
2017	24	+0.00%
2023	24	+0.00%
Source: INSEE

== See also ==
- Communes of the Haute-Loire department
