= Blassac =

- Commune
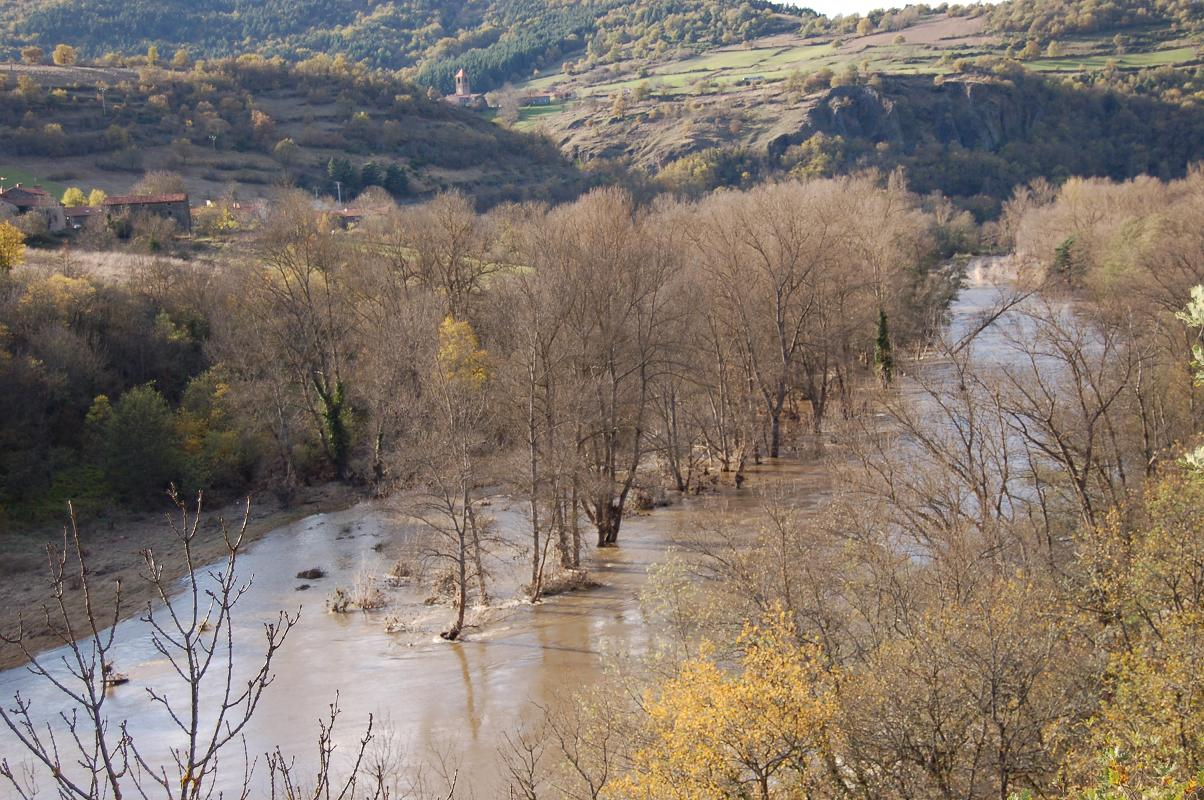
- In the distance: the church of Saint-Roch, perched on its volcanic promontory above the flooded Allier in November 2008
- Location of Blassac
- Location within France Location within Auvergne-Rhône-Alpes
- Coordinates: 45°10′16″N 3°24′02″E
- Country: France
- Region: Auvergne-Rhône-Alpes
- Department: Haute-Loire
- Arrondissement: Brioude
- Canton: Pays de Lafayette
- Intercommunality: Rives du Haut Allier

Government
  - Mayor (2020–2026): Didier Hansmetzger
- Area^{1}: 12.56 km^{2} (4.85 sq mi)
- Elevation: 518 m (1,699 ft)
- Highest elevation: 953 m (3,127 ft)
- Lowest elevation: 441 m (1,447 ft)
- Population (2023): 126
  - Density: 10.0/km^{2} (26.0/sq mi)
- Time zone: UTC+01:00 (CET)
  - Summer (DST): UTC+02:00 (CEST)
- INSEE/Postal code: 43031 /43380
- ^{1} French Land Register data, which excludes lakes, ponds, glaciers > 1 km^{2} (0.386 sq mi or 247 acres) and river estuaries.

Blassac (French pronunciation: [blasak]) is a commune in the Haute-Loire department and Auvergne-Rhône-Alpes region of south-east central France.

== Population ==
Historical population
Year	Pop.	±% p.a.
1968	174	—
1975	146	−2.48%
1982	143	−0.30%
1990	130	−1.18%
1999	121	−0.79%
2007	146	+2.38%
2012	154	+1.07%
2017	136	−2.46%
2023	126	−1.26%
Source: INSEE

== See also ==
- Communes of the Haute-Loire department
