= Cerzat =

- Commune
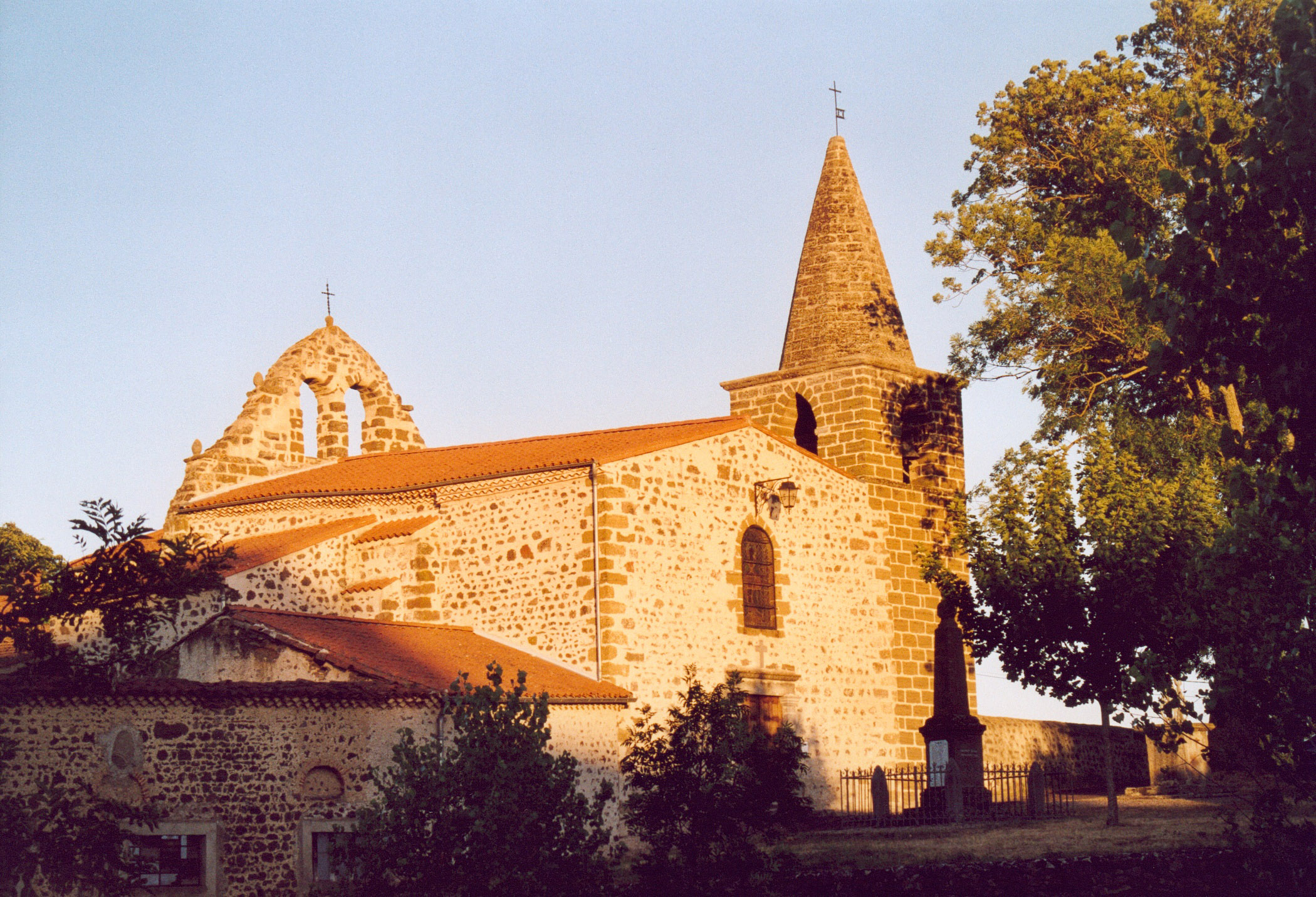
- Location of Cerzat
- Location within France Location within Auvergne-Rhône-Alpes
- Coordinates: 45°09′42″N 3°28′46″E
- Country: France
- Region: Auvergne-Rhône-Alpes
- Department: Haute-Loire
- Arrondissement: Brioude
- Canton: Pays de Lafayette

Government
  - Mayor (2020–2026): Jacky Delivert
- Area^{1}: 10.41 km^{2} (4.02 sq mi)
- Elevation: 600 m (2,000 ft)
- Highest elevation: 747 m (2,451 ft)
- Lowest elevation: 475 m (1,558 ft)
- Population (2023): 220
  - Density: 21/km^{2} (55/sq mi)
- Time zone: UTC+01:00 (CET)
  - Summer (DST): UTC+02:00 (CEST)
- INSEE/Postal code: 43044 /43380
- ^{1} French Land Register data, which excludes lakes, ponds, glaciers > 1 km^{2} (0.386 sq mi or 247 acres) and river estuaries.

Cerzat (French pronunciation: [sɛʁza]) is a commune in the Haute-Loire department in south-central France.

== Population ==
Historical population
Year	Pop.	±% p.a.
1968	226	—
1975	186	−2.74%
1982	184	−0.15%
1990	193	+0.60%
1999	197	+0.23%
2007	194	−0.19%
2012	200	+0.61%
2017	209	+0.88%
2023	220	+0.86%
Source: INSEE

== See also ==
- Communes of the Haute-Loire department
