= Mazeyrat-d'Allier =

- Commune
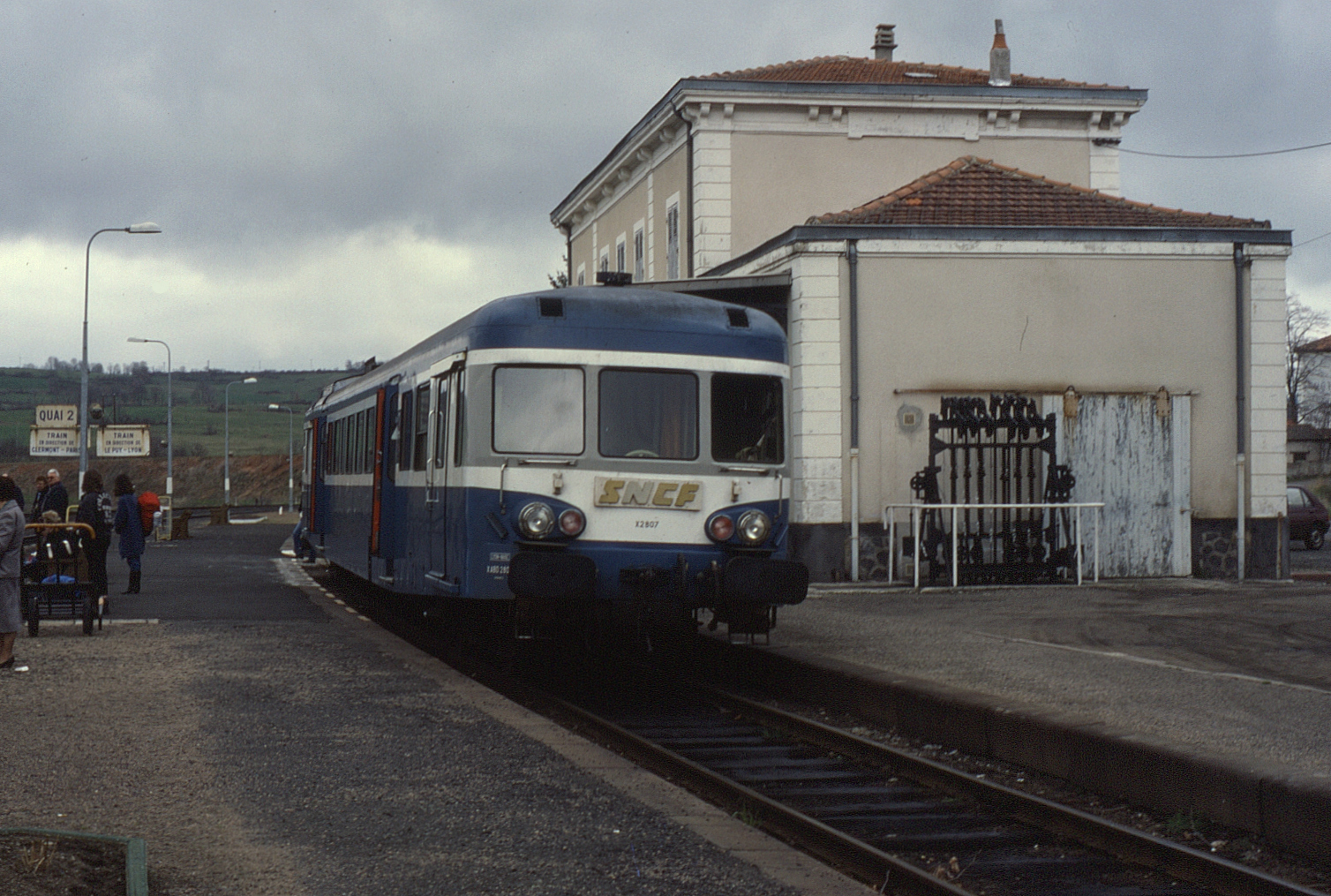
- Train station
- Location of Mazeyrat-d'Allier
- Location within France Location within Auvergne-Rhône-Alpes
- Coordinates: 45°07′18″N 3°31′44″E
- Country: France
- Region: Auvergne-Rhône-Alpes
- Department: Haute-Loire
- Arrondissement: Brioude
- Canton: Pays de Lafayette

Government
  - Mayor (2020–2026): Philippe Molhérat
- Area^{1}: 44.95 km^{2} (17.36 sq mi)
- Elevation: 630 m (2,070 ft)
- Highest elevation: 1,000 m (3,300 ft)
- Lowest elevation: 481 m (1,578 ft)
- Population (2023): 1,432
  - Density: 31.86/km^{2} (82.51/sq mi)
- Time zone: UTC+01:00 (CET)
  - Summer (DST): UTC+02:00 (CEST)
- INSEE/Postal code: 43132 /43300
- ^{1} French Land Register data, which excludes lakes, ponds, glaciers > 1 km^{2} (0.386 sq mi or 247 acres) and river estuaries.

Mazeyrat-d'Allier (French pronunciation: [mazeʁa dalje], literally Mazeyrat of Allier; Occitan: Maserac d'Alèir) is a commune in the Haute-Loire department in south-central France.

== Population ==
Historical population
Year	Pop.	±% p.a.
1968	1,067	—
1975	1,079	+0.16%
1982	1,089	+0.13%
1990	1,153	+0.72%
1999	1,228	+0.70%
2007	1,487	+2.42%
2012	1,536	+0.65%
2017	1,480	−0.74%
2023	1,432	−0.55%
Source: INSEE

== See also ==
- Communes of the Haute-Loire department
