= Cubelles, Haute-Loire =

Cubelles
- Commune
- Location of Cubelles
- Location within France Location within Auvergne-Rhône-Alpes
- Coordinates: 45°00′27″N 3°34′47″E
- Country: France
- Region: Auvergne-Rhône-Alpes
- Department: Haute-Loire
- Arrondissement: Brioude
- Canton: Gorges de l'Allier-Gévaudan

Government
  - Mayor (2020–2026): Bernard Cubizolles
- Area^{1}: 12.13 km^{2} (4.68 sq mi)
- Elevation: 960 m (3,150 ft)
- Highest elevation: 1,054 m (3,458 ft)
- Lowest elevation: 640 m (2,100 ft)
- Population (2023): 154
  - Density: 12.7/km^{2} (32.9/sq mi)
- Time zone: UTC+01:00 (CET)
  - Summer (DST): UTC+02:00 (CEST)
- INSEE/Postal code: 43083 /43170
- ^{1} French Land Register data, which excludes lakes, ponds, glaciers > 1 km^{2} (0.386 sq mi or 247 acres) and river estuaries.

Cubelles (French pronunciation: [kybɛl]; Occitan: Cubèl) is a commune in the Haute-Loire department in south-central France.

== Population ==
Historical population
Year	Pop.	±% p.a.
1968	195	—
1975	174	−1.61%
1982	155	−1.64%
1990	131	−2.08%
1999	126	−0.43%
2007	123	−0.30%
2012	141	+2.77%
2017	152	+1.51%
2023	154	+0.22%
Source: INSEE

== See also ==
- Communes of the Haute-Loire department
