= Campaniacum =

Campaniacum is the etymon inferred from numerous toponyms in France. The Toponymie générale de la France (TGF) derives it from a Roman personal name Campanius and the Gaulish suffix -acum. The -i- (which is important in the phonetic evolution of *Campaniacum) suggests that Campanius is a gens name.

The modern forms differ according to the diverse phonetic evolutions of the local dialects.

- Campagnac (TGF § 7029)
- Campénéac (Morbihan) (TGF § 7535)
- Campigny (TGF § 8819)
- Champagnac (TGF § 7061 and § 7438)
- Champagnat (TGF § 7612 and § 8480)
- Champagné (TGF § 8133)
- Champagneux (TGF § 8537)
- Champagney (TGF § 7873)
- Champagny (TGF § 8868)
- Champigny (TGF § 8868)

The initial /ka/ of *Campaniacum became /ʃa/ (written Cha) in most of Gaul, both in langue d'oïl dialects and the northern langue d'oc dialects; but north of the Joret line, and most Langue d'oc dialects (southern one) /ka/ (written Ca-) was preserved.

In the form Champigny, Gaston Zink offered an explanation for the sequence ign in place of the expected agn: before the palatal consonant /ɲ/, the /a/ shifted to /e/, which in turn closed to /i/; Zink points out the parallel form (fungum) campaniolum ('mushroom') which became champegneul in Old French and champignon (with substitution of suffix) in modern French. This shift is restricted to central langue d'oïl.

== See also ==
- Champignac
- Pourceaugnac
