= Gangulphus =

Burgundian saint (died 760)

Saint Gangulphus of Burgundy
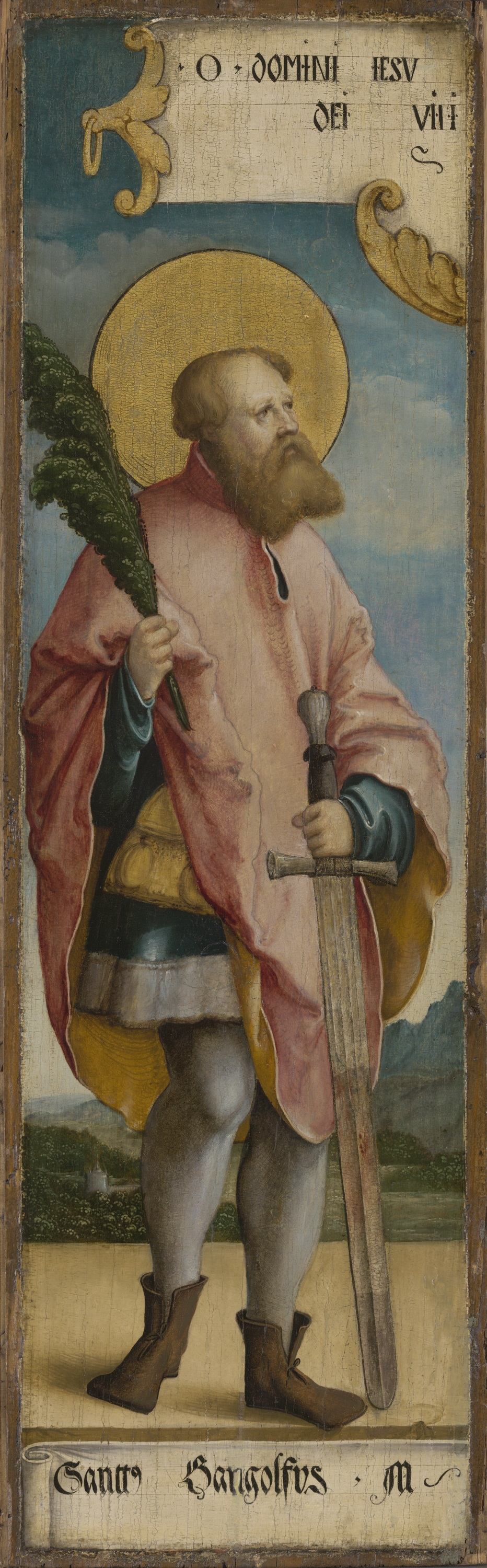
- Image of Saint Gangulphus (Gangolf), by the Meister von Meßkirch, ca. 1535
- Died: 11 May 760 AD; Avallon
- Venerated in: Roman Catholic Church, Eastern Orthodox Church
- Feast: 11 May
- Attributes: Pictured as a Burgundian knight with a fountain springing under his sword. He holds a shield with a cross. He may also hold the spear with which he was murdered
- Patronage: Saint of husbands unhappily married; tanners, shoemakers, children, and horses; invoked against knee pains, sicknesses affecting the eyes and skin; invoked against marital difficulties and adultery.

Gangulphus of Burgundy (died 11 May 760 AD) is venerated as a martyr by the Catholic Church. Gangulphus was a Burgundian courtier whose historical existence can be attested by only a single document: a deed from the court of Pepin the Short, dated 762, attests that he was a great landowner, whose family dominated the region and exercised a lot of power.

Gangulphus decided to renounce his wealth and become a hermit. Even so, he was subsequently killed by his wife's lover, who wished to remove Gangulphus as a possible interference to the adulterous relationship.

== Legend ==
Born to one of the most illustrious families of Burgundy, his education was provided by his parents, who were virtuous Christians. As a youth, Gangulphus was known for his great honesty, chastity, and propriety, and visited churches and read religious texts, avoiding the company of libertines. When his parents died, he became a model landowner, taking care of the household economy with ease and industry and also providing for the churches and the poor on his land. When it came time to marry, he chose a woman who did not share his virtues.

As an important nobleman, Gangulphus participated in the wars of the time, but also dedicated himself to preaching the gospel in Frisia.

On a journey back to Burgundy, he found a property at Bassigny upon which stood a fountain that issued fresh and good water. Gangulphus bought the property. However, his friends mocked him because the property's fountain would not serve back at home. However, when Gangulphus returned home, he pushed a stick into the soil. The next day, he instructed his servant to pull the stick out of the soil. Out of the soil emerged a new fountain, from which gushed fresh water.

During his absence, his wife had committed adultery with a priest. His wife protested her innocence, but Gangulphus wished her innocence to be judged by God. Thus, he had her dip her hand into the very same source of water he had created on his property. His wife’s hand was completely and miraculously scalded by the water. Gangulphus was fairly lenient: he forbade his wife from ever sharing his marriage bed and also ordered the priest to go abroad.

Gangulphus meanwhile withdrew to his castle at Avallon, near Vézelay, performing works of penance and charity.

However, his wife soon had her lover return. Hurrying back, the priest, wishing to decapitate Gangulphus, attacked him as he slept. However, the priest missed and injured Gangulphus' thigh. The wound, however, proved to be fatal and Gangulphus received the last sacraments on 11 May 760.

The priest fled the country with Gangulphus' wife. Purported miracles soon took place at Gangulphus' tomb. Both his wife and the priest soon suffered illnesses and died.

== Veneration ==
Gangulphus' relics were translated to Varennes-sur-Amance in the diocese of Langres, where his cult developed, and later distributed to various places in France, Germany, the Low Countries and Switzerland.

Gangulphus' name is found in numerous martyrologies of the 10th and 11th centuries, in France as well as in Germany, and later in England and Italy. His Life was probably written at Varennes.

Hrotsvitha of Gandersheim wrote a version of his life around 960.

Some of his relics, consisting of part of his head, can be found at the Gangolfskirche in Bamberg. The Gangolfskirche in Hollfeld developed as a daughter church of the Bamberger church. On the Milseburg, in the Rhön Mountains, rises a Gangolfkapelle, as well as at Wolpertswende in Upper Swabia and at Fladungen in northern Franconia. There is also a Sankt Gangloff in Thuringia.

Gangulphus became also associated with the spot now occupied by the area known as Saint-Gingolph, where he is said to have dedicated himself as a hermit to a life of prayer and penance. Local legends confused Gangulphus with a hypothetical soldier of the Theban Legion who escaped from nearby Agaunum and would have faced martyrdom there.

There is a poem about the saint in The Ingoldsby Legends, entitled A Lay of St. Gengulphus, by Richard Barham.

== The Office of St Gangulphus ==
The Psalterium Foundation has undertaken to collect the available materials on the saint. The extensive research done earlier by Paul Trenchard was only available on the Internet Archive. His website has been reconstructed and extended with new findings on the website gengulphus.com. Moreover, an Office was reconstructed from disparate fragments. Finally in early 2022, this Office was sung and recorded by the gregorian chant ensemble, Hartkeriana. It appears that most of this Office has not been sung in over 500 years. The recording will become available in due time.

== Gallery ==
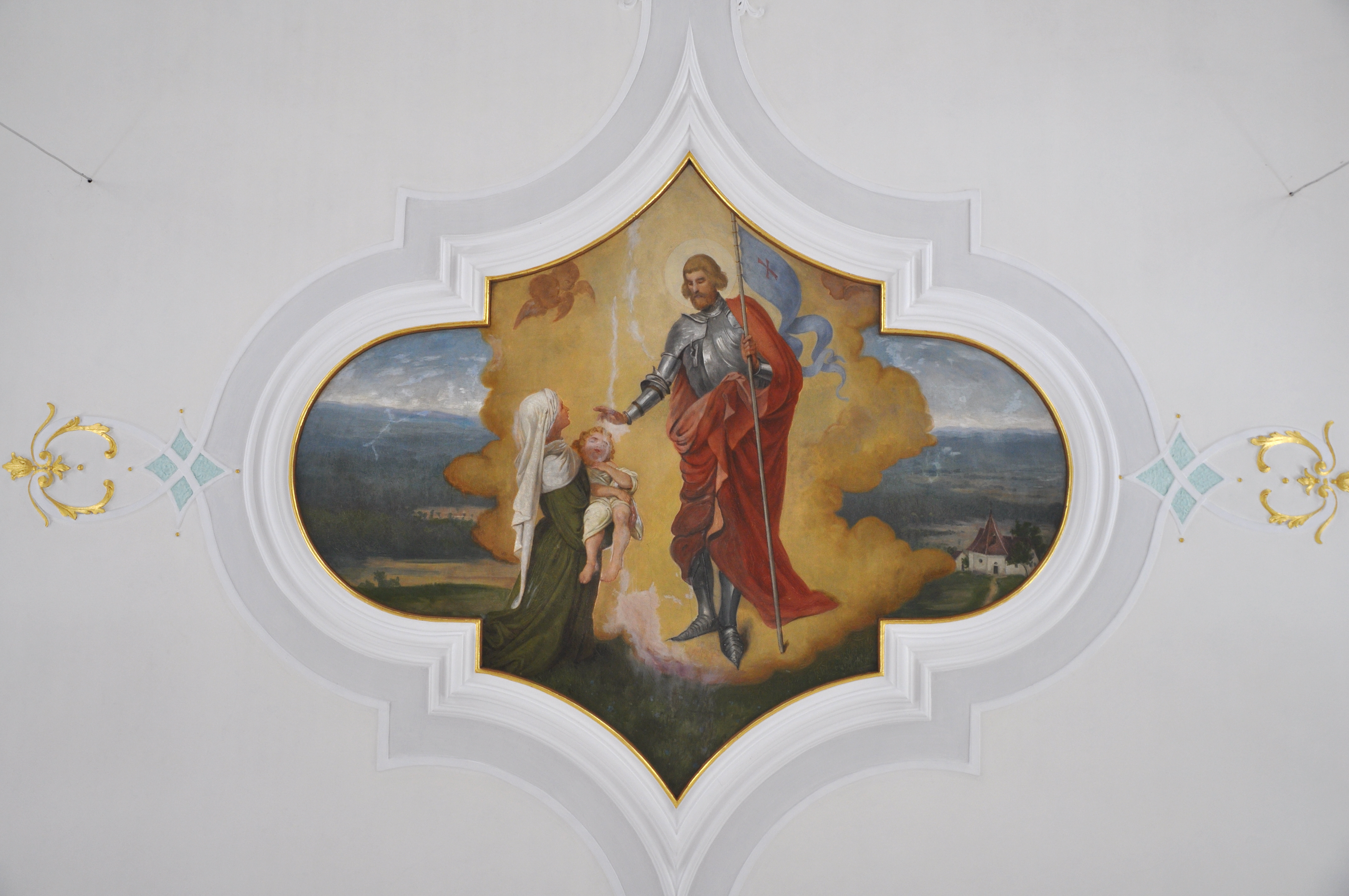
Image of Gangulphus from a church at Wolpertswende

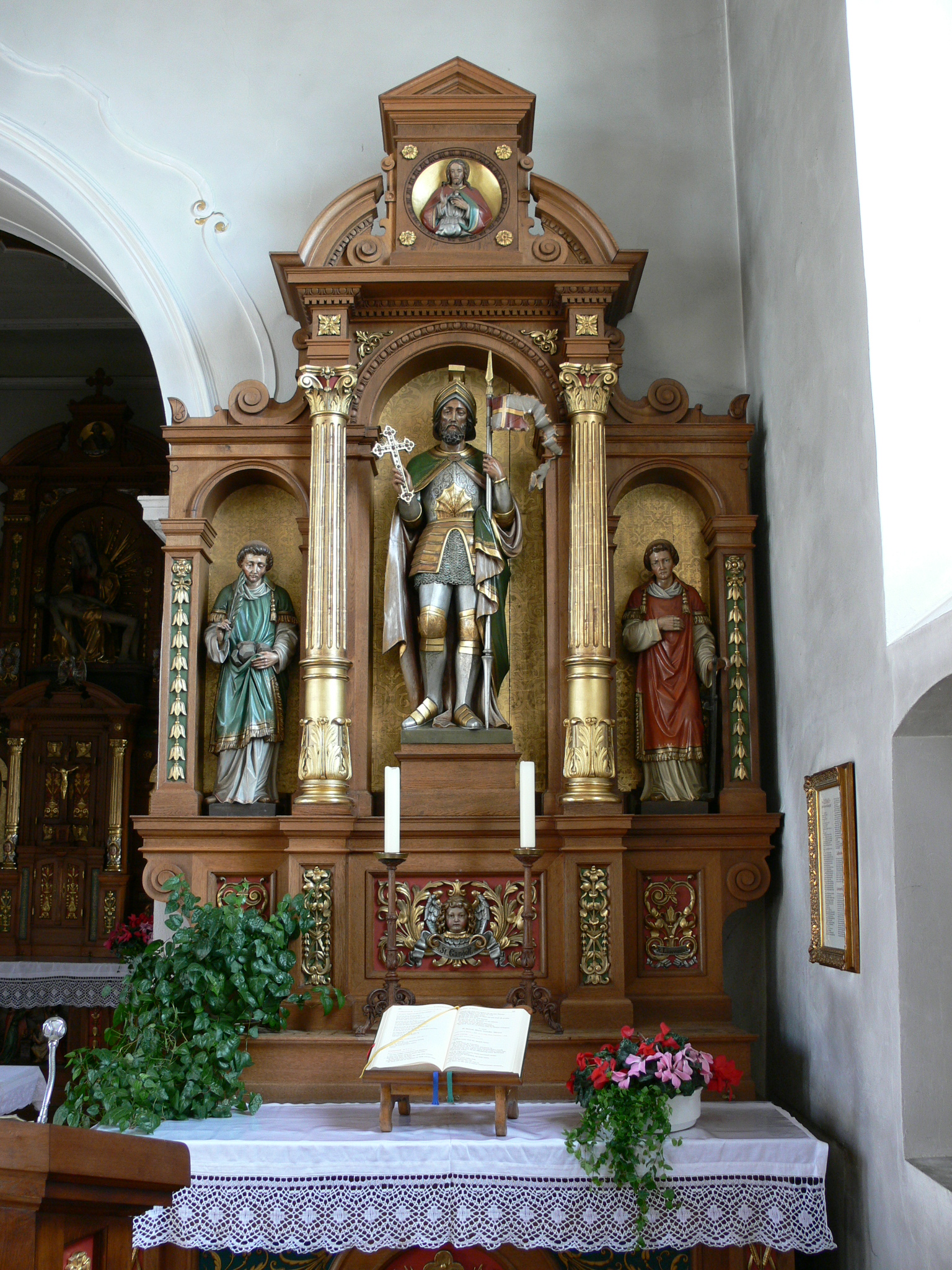
Saint Gangolf Altar, Wolpertswende

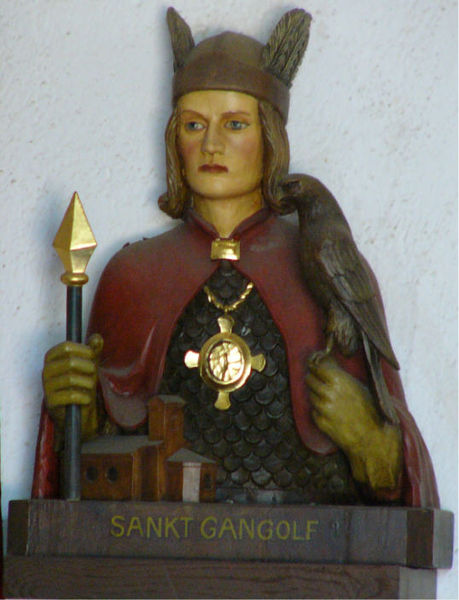
Bust of Gangulphus in Milseburg.

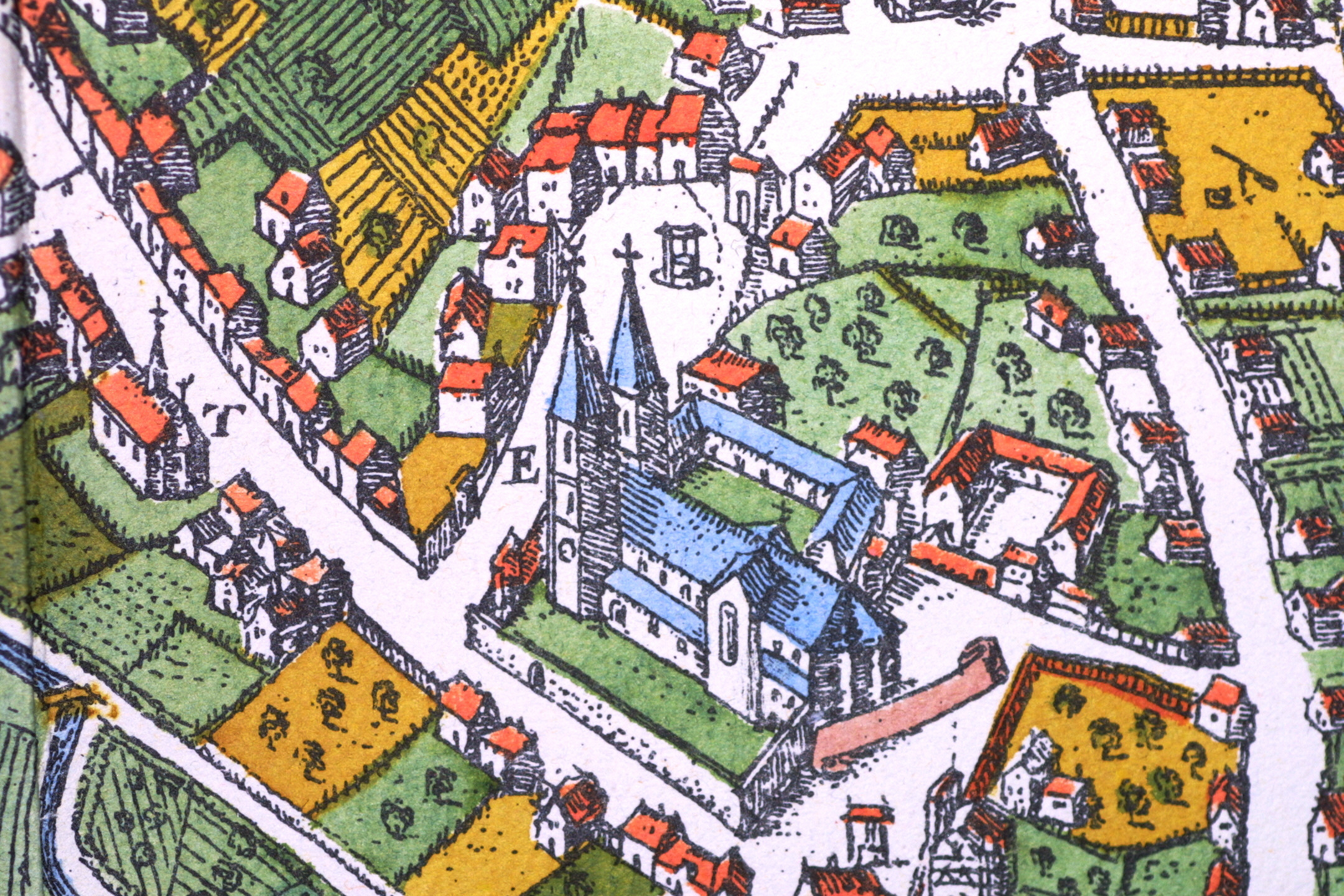
Historical map of Bamberg. Church of St Gangolf at Bamberg.

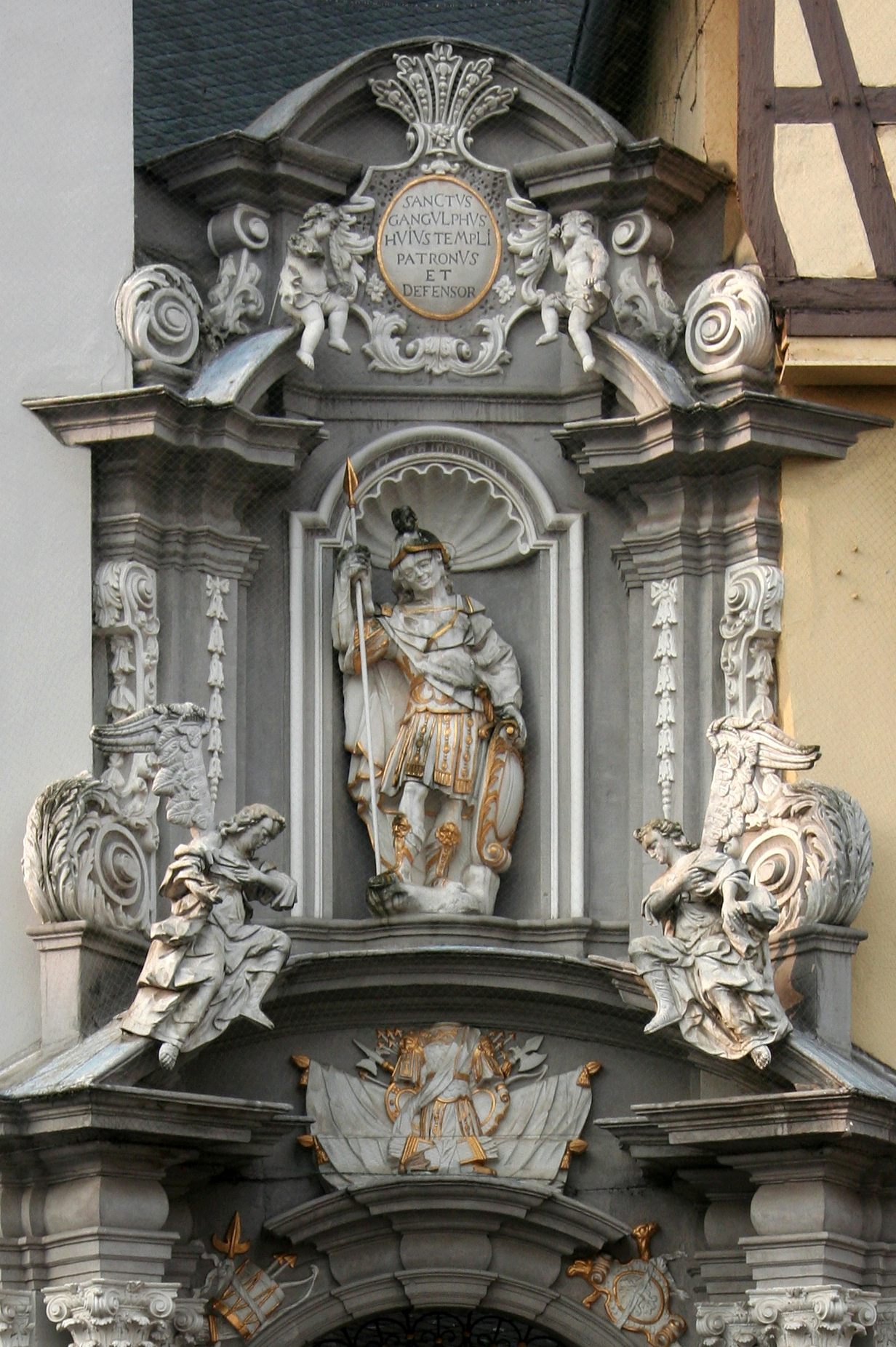
Portal of St Gangolf in Trier

== See also ==
- Saint Gangulphus, patron saint archive
