= Château d'Auzon =

Ruined 14th century castle in Auzon in the Haute-Loire département of France

Coordinates: 45°23′30″N 3°22′20″E

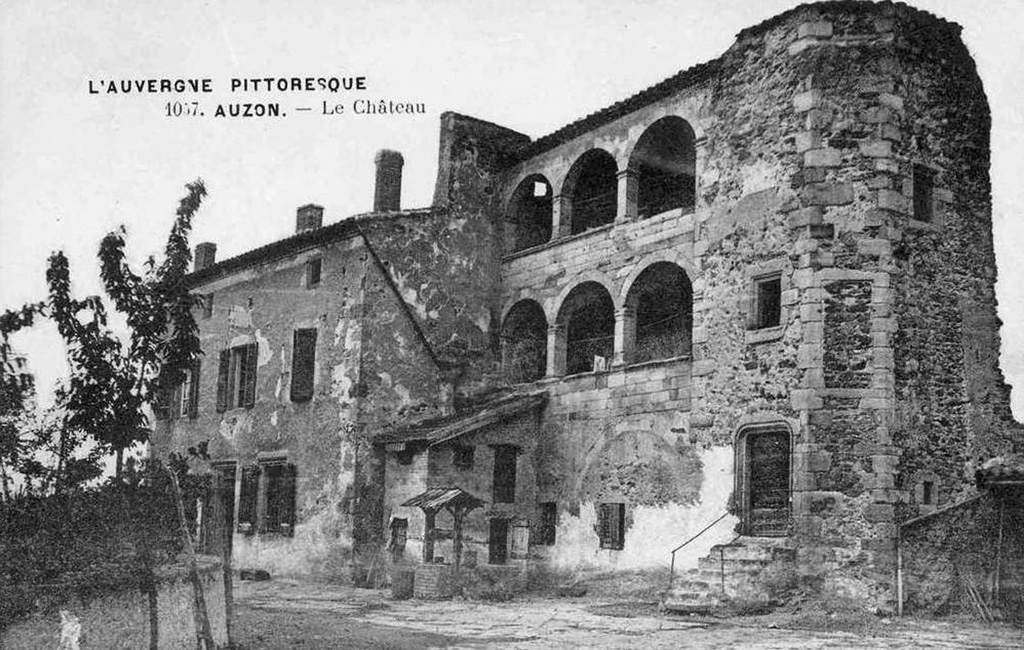
The staircase tower and gallery (post card, c.1900)

The Château d'Auzon is a ruined 14th century castle, with alterations in the 15th and 16th centuries, in the commune of Auzon in the Haute-Loire département of France.

== History ==
The first known lord, Bernard d'Auzon, was mentioned in 1078. During the French Wars of Religion, the castle was captured on the 22 September 1589 by the Catholic League forces under Monsieur de Randan. In the 17th century, the buildings were partly demolished. At the time of the French Revolution, the castle and its estate were sold as national assets and the castle was almost entirely destroyed.

== Description ==
The edifice is on the western end of a rocky outcrop. It consists of a fortified enceinte built dominated by the ramparts on three sides. The fourth side is closed by a curtain wall pierced by a gate. At the end of the north flank, a circular tower with several cannon holes protects the gateway. The central residential building was almost entirely destroyed during the Revolution. The only remnant is a staircase tower, built against galleries and vaulted arcades, that served the upper floors. On the ground floor, a small vaulted room contains a painted icon that is difficult to identify. This room could have been the old oratory of the castle. In the 19th century, a house was built on the old foundations of part of the structure.

The castle is privately owned and is not open to the public. It has been listed since 1989 as a monument historique by the French Ministry of Culture.

== See also ==
- List of castles in France
