= Nom de guerre =

Alternate name used in conflict

A nom de guerre (French pronunciation: [nɔ̃ d(ə) ɡɛʁ], 'war name') is a pseudonym used to disguise a combatant's real identity or, formerly, simply to identify them clearly.

In ancien régime France it would be adopted by each new recruit (or assigned to them by the captain of their company) as they enlisted in the French army. These pseudonyms had an official character and were the predecessor of identification numbers: soldiers were identified by their first names, their family names, and their noms de guerre (e.g. Jean Amarault dit Lafidélité). These pseudonyms were usually related to the soldier's place of origin (e.g. Jean Deslandes dit Champigny, for a soldier coming from a town named Champigny), or to a particular physical or personal trait (e.g. Antoine Bonnet dit Prettaboire, for a soldier prêt à boire, 'ready to drink'). In 1716, a nom de guerre was mandatory for every soldier; officers did not adopt noms de guerre as they considered them derogatory. In daily life, these aliases could replace the real family name.

Noms de guerre were adopted for security reasons by members of World War II French Resistance and Polish resistance. Such pseudonyms are often adopted by military special-forces soldiers, such as members of the SAS and similar units of resistance fighters, terrorists, and guerrillas. This practice hides their identities and may protect their families from reprisals; it may also be a form of dissociation from domestic life.

Some well-known men who adopted noms de guerre include Ilich Ramírez Sánchez (Carlos the Jackal); Willy Brandt, Chancellor of West Germany; Subcomandante Marcos, spokesman of the Zapatista Army of National Liberation (EZLN); and Ahmed al-Sharaa (formerly known as Abu Mohammad al-Julani), President of Syria. During Lehi's underground fight against the British in Mandatory Palestine, the organization's commander Yitzhak Shamir (later Prime Minister of Israel) adopted the nom de guerre Michael, in honour of Ireland's Michael Collins.

Revolutionaries and resistance leaders, such as Lenin, Stalin, Trotsky, Leclerc, Subcomandante Marcos, and Josip Broz Tito, often adopted their noms de guerre as their proper names after the struggle. Georgios Grivas, the Greek-Cypriot EOKA militant, adopted the nom de guerre Digenis (Διγενής). In the French Foreign Legion, recruits can adopt a pseudonym to break with their past lives. Mercenaries have long used noms de guerre, sometimes even multiple identities, depending on the country, conflict, and circumstance. Some of the most familiar noms de guerre today are the kunya used by Islamic State's mujahideen and Al Qaeda members. These take the form of a teknonym, either literal or figurative.

Such war names have also been used in Africa. Part of the molding of child soldiers has included giving them such names. They were also used by fighters in the People's Liberation Army of Namibia, with some fighters retaining these names as their permanent names.

== See also ==
- List of pseudonyms
