= Henri-Louis de Chavagnac =

French naval officer (1664–1743)

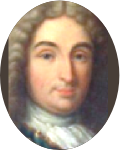
- Born: 1664; Blesle, the Lyonnais, France
- Died: 9 July 1743 (aged 78–79) Blesle, the Lyonnais, France
- Allegiance: France
- Service: Navy
- Service years: 1683–1741
- Rank: Lieutenant general of the naval armies
- Conflicts: Beachy Head (10 July 1690); Barfleur (May 1692); Vélez-Malaga (24 August 1704); Saint Kitts & Nevis (February 1706)
- Awards: Commander of the Order of Saint Louis

Henri-Louis de Chavagnac (1664 – 9 July 1743) was a French naval officer. He is known for a devastating raid against the English colonies of Saint Kitts and Nevis in February 1706.

== Family ==
Henri-Louis de Chavagnac was born in 1664 in Blesle, Haute-Loire, France. He was the second son of François de Chavagnac and Louise Blanc-du-Bos, his second wife. He married Louise-Julienne des Nos de Champmeslin in Brest, Finistère, on 30 November 1708. They had two children, Gilles-Henri-Louis-Clair (born 1709) and Marie-Anne-Julienne (1712-1718).

== Junior officer ==
Chavagnac joined the Gardes de la Marine in October 1683. He became ship's ensign (Enseigne de vaisseau) in January 1686. He participated in the Battle of Beachy Head on 10 July 1690, and in the Battle of Barfleur in May 1692. He was promoted to ship-of-the-line lieutenant (lieutenant de vaisseau) in January 1690, and served in the Antilles. In 1702, he was made a major in Rochefort, Charente-Maritime, and in 1703 was transferred to Toulon.

== Senior officer ==
Chavagnac was promoted to ship-of-the-line captain (capitaine de vaisseau) in 1704. He fought in the Battle of Vélez-Malaga on 24 August 1704, then commanded the company of Gardes de la Marine in Brest. In December 1705, he commanded a squadron charged with attacking the English possession in the Antilles. He caused great damage to the English colonies of Saint Kitts and Nevis in February 1706. Chavagnac spent a week in Saint Kitts, where he caused great damage and looted much property, including 300 slaves. He and Pierre Le Moyne d'Iberville then invaded Nevis with 3,000 men. The English governor surrendered when they landed near Charlestown, much of which they burned. They destroyed plantations and took more loot, including between 3,000 and 5,000 slaves.

Chavagnac was made a knight of the Order of Saint Louis. In 1716, he purchased the seigniory and château of Blesle, formerly owned by the lords of Mercœur. In February 1720, he was made Marquis de Chavagnac. In 1727, Chavagnac cruised off the coast of Spain. He was promoted to Chef d'escadre of the naval armies on 27 March 1728. In 1737, he was appointed commander of the navy at Toulon. In 1741 he was made a commander of the Order of Saint Louis. That year he retired with the rank of lieutenant general of the naval armies. Chavagnac died on 9 July 1743 in Blesle, Haute-Loire.

== Sources ==
- Blesle (in French), Brioude Sud Auvergne
- "Henri-Louis de Chavagnac", Ecole navale (in French)
- Hickman, David (7 July 2016), A/AS Level History for AQA The Sun King: Louis XIV, France and Europe, 1643–1715 Student Book, Cambridge University Press, ISBN 978-1-107-57177-8
- Hozier, Louis Pierre d'. (1741), Armorial général de la France, Firmin-Didot
