= L'Ordre =

L'Ordre can refer to:

- L'Ordre (novel), 1929 novel by Marcel Arland which won the Prix Goncourt
- L'Ordre (TV), 1986 4-episode TV series by Étienne Périer
