= Chassignolles =

Chassignolles may refer to the following places in France:

- Chassignolles, Indre, a commune in the Indre department
- Chassignolles, Haute-Loire, a commune in the Haute-Loire department
