= Joret line =

Isogloss in northern France

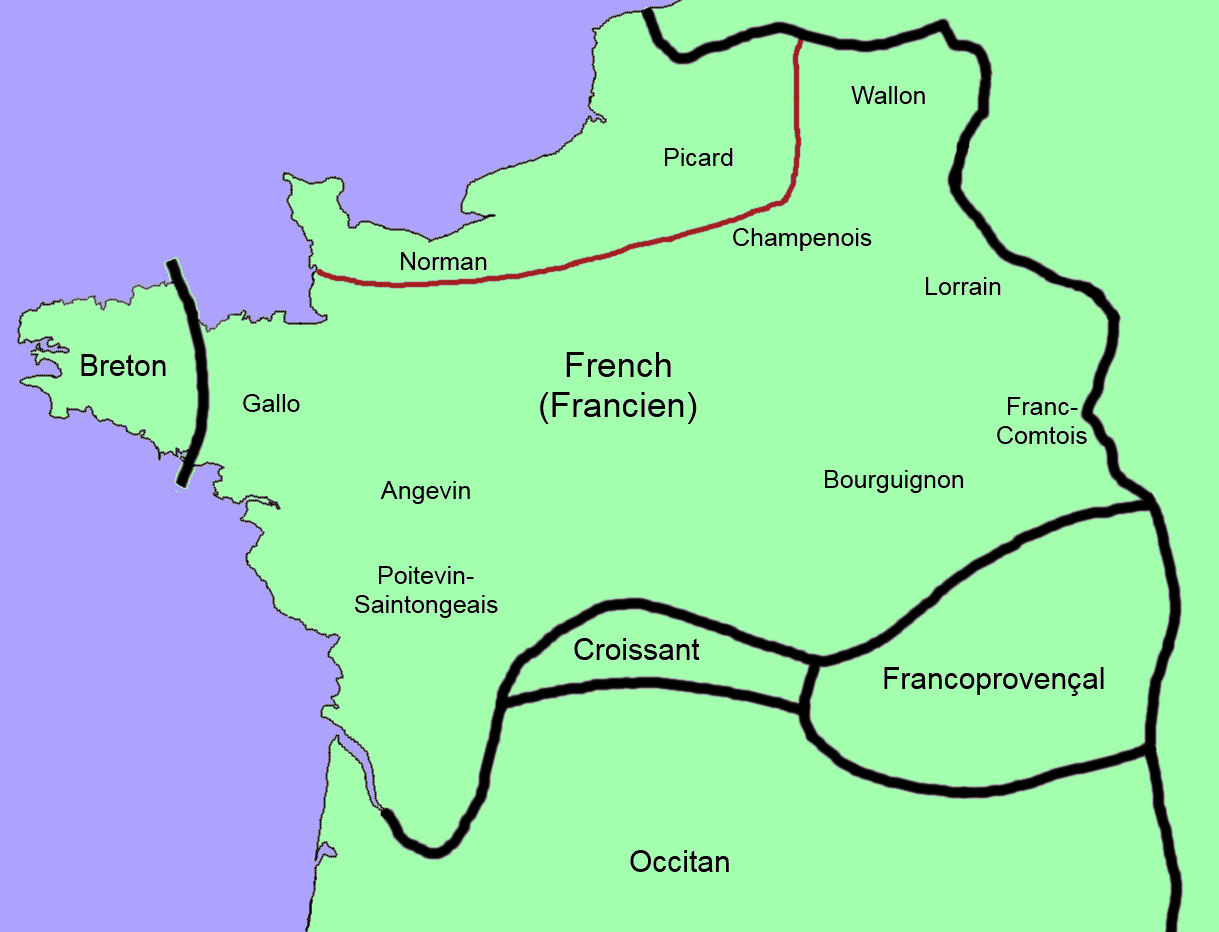
The Joret line (in red)

The Joret line (French: ligne Joret; Norman: lène Joret; Picard: line Joret) is an isogloss that divides the langues d'oïl. Dialects north and west of it preserve Latin /k/ and /ɡ/ before /a/; dialects south and east of it palatalize them. In Old French the result of this palatalisation was /t͡ʃ/ and /d͡ʒ/ (for original /k/ and /ɡ/ respectively), which yield /ʃ/ and /ʒ/ in Modern French. The line was first identified by Charles Joret and published in 1883.

The area north and west of it is sometimes called the 'Normano-Picard domain' (French: domaine normano-picard). Within it lie Picard and the northern dialects of Norman.

== Geography ==
The Joret line extends from the Channel Islands (including Jèrriais, Guernésiais, and Sercquiais) and across the continent from Granville, Manche to the linguistic border with Dutch in the North of France and Belgium. (Note: People in western Wallonia speak Picard (Tournai, Ath, Soignies, Mons, etc.)) It runs approximately west to east through Normandy north of Granville and Villedieu-les-Poêles and divides Manche in two linguistically and separates Calvados and Orne along with Eure; then it curves progressively to the north and ends up approximately south to north in Picardy, where the line runs with the Amiénois and Thiérache, up to the west of Rebecq, Beaumont and Chimay in Belgium, where it separates Picard from Walloon.

== Examples ==
- Norman Picard /k/ ~ Southern Norman, French /ʃ/, Walloon /tʃ/ (palatalization)

Latin cattu (cat) gave rise to /ka/ cat north of the line and /ʃa/ chat to the south.

Low Latin *captiare (to catch) gave rise to cachier / cacher (> English catch) north of the line and chasser (> English chase) to the south.

Low Latin *cantionem (song), Picard canchon West of the line, French chanson, Walloon tchinson South and East of the line. Similarly Latin cantare → canter vs. chanter, tchanter.

Frankish *pokka (bag) gave rise to /puk/ pouque (> English dial. poke) north of the line and pouche (> English pouch) to the south. French poche (pocket), Norman pouquette (> English pocket).

Latin candela (candle) gave rise to candelle north of the line and chandelle to the south.

Celtic *carros > Latin carrus gave rise to car (> English car) north of the line and char (wain, carriage), chariot (> English chariot) to the south.

Celtic *kagio-, Gaulish caio- > Norman Picard kay, cay (> ME kay) > French quai (> English quay); Old French chay > French chai (wine cellar)

- Norman Picard /ɡ/ ~ Southern Norman, French /ʒ/, Walloon /dʒ/ (palatalization)

Latin gamba (leg) gave rise to /ɡãb/ gambe north of the line and /ʒãb/ jambe to the south, djambe to the East.

Frankish *gard- (yard) gave rise to gardin (> English garden) north of the line and jardin to the south.

Late Latin *galleto > Norman Picard gal(l)on (> English gallon); Old French jallon, French jalon (measure)

== Second isogloss ==
Another effect of the palatalizations a bit further to the north but quite parallel was this:

- Norman Picard /ʃ/ (or /tʃ/) ~ Southern Norman /ts/ or /s/, French /s/.

Low Latin *captiare > Norman Picard cacher, cachi(er) (> English catch); Southern Norman, French chasser

Low Latin ceresiu(m) > Norman Picard cherise, chrise, chise (> English cherry); Southern Norman srise French cerise

== Third isogloss ==
A third isogloss, marking a consonantal change unrelated to the others, more or less follows the Joret line throughout Normandy and continues through northeastern France. It includes all of Picardy, Wallonia, Champagne, Lorraine and a part of Burgundy.

Germanic /w/ (sometimes Latin /v/ was affected as well) was kept north of the line (written w or v), but became /ɡ/ (written g or gu) south of the line.

- Northern French /v/ ~ French /ɡ/

Latin vespa / Frankish *waspa (wasp) > Picard Wespe, Norman Vêpe ~ French guêpe (wasp)

Frankish *wala hlaupan (S. English well and leap) > Picard, Old Norman waloper (> English wallop); French galoper (> English gallop)

Frankish wahtôn (S. English wake and watch) > Picard, Old Norman wait(i)er (> English wait); Old French guaitier, French guetter

Frankish *werra > Old Picard Old Norman werre, warre (> English war); French guerre (war)

== Toponymy ==
The Joret line affects toponyms in Normandy and Picardy: Cambrai (corresponding to Chambray), Camembert, Carentan (corresponding to Charenton), Caen (Wace gallicized as Chaem).

Norman placenames derived from the Gallo-Romance word Campaniacum show initial C- in some cases (Campigny, north) and initial Ch- in others (Champigny-la-Futelaye, south).

== See also ==
- La Spezia–Rimini Line
- Norman language
- Picard language
- Walloon language
