= Champigny =

Champigny may refer to several places.

== Communes in France ==
- Champigny, Marne
- Champigny, Yonne
- Champigny-en-Beauce, in the Loir-et-Cher département
- Champigny-la-Futelaye, in the Eure département
- Champigny-le-Sec, in the Vienne département
- Champigny-lès-Langres, in the Haute-Marne département
- Champigny-sous-Varennes, in the Haute-Marne département
- Champigny-sur-Aube, in the Aube département
- Champigny-sur-Marne, in the Val-de-Marne département
- Champigny-sur-Veude, in the Indre-et-Loire département

== Canada ==
- Champigny, Quebec City, an administrative sector and neighbourhood in Quebec City

== See also ==
- Collège de Champigny in Quebec, Canada
- Campigny (disambiguation)
- Souzay-Champigny, Maine-et-Loire department, France
