= Saint-Étienne-sur-Blesle =

- Commune
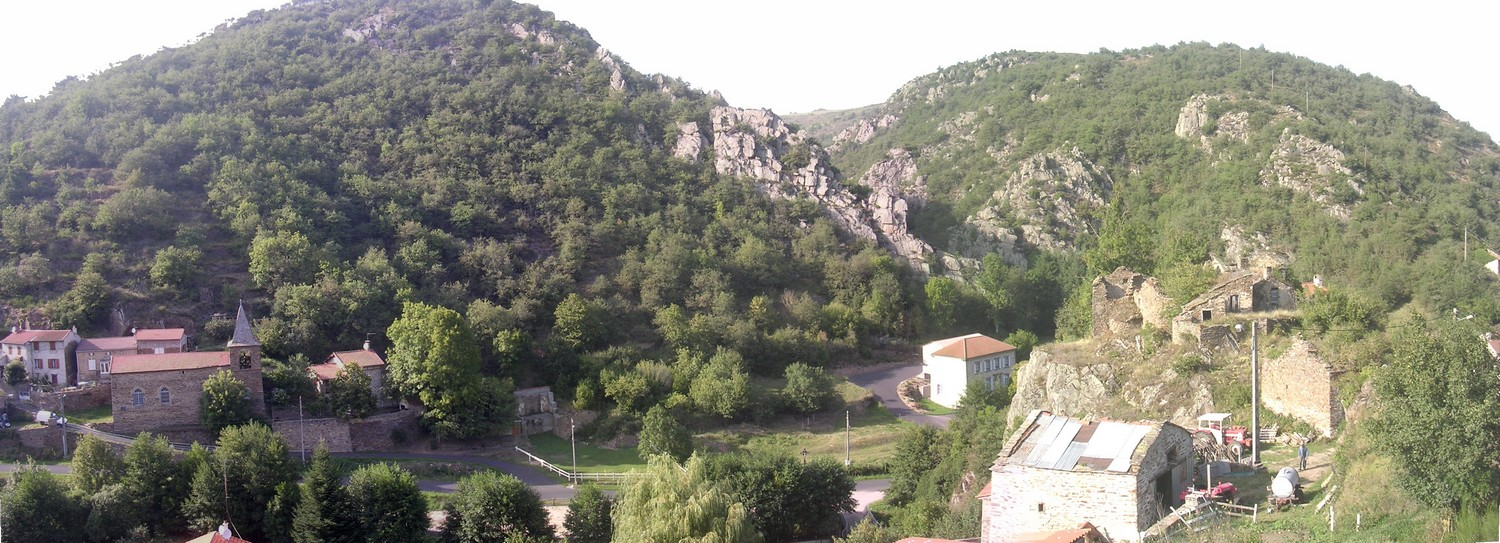
- Location of Saint-Étienne-sur-Blesle
- Location within France Location within Auvergne-Rhône-Alpes
- Coordinates: 45°18′43″N 3°08′17″E
- Country: France
- Region: Auvergne-Rhône-Alpes
- Department: Haute-Loire
- Arrondissement: Brioude
- Canton: Sainte-Florine

Government
  - Mayor (2020–2026): Alain Mirand
- Area^{1}: 17.65 km^{2} (6.81 sq mi)
- Elevation: 640 m (2,100 ft)
- Highest elevation: 1,004 m (3,294 ft)
- Lowest elevation: 554 m (1,818 ft)
- Population (2023): 53
  - Density: 3.0/km^{2} (7.8/sq mi)
- Time zone: UTC+01:00 (CET)
  - Summer (DST): UTC+02:00 (CEST)
- INSEE/Postal code: 43182 /43450
- ^{1} French Land Register data, which excludes lakes, ponds, glaciers > 1 km^{2} (0.386 sq mi or 247 acres) and river estuaries.

Saint-Étienne-sur-Blesle (French pronunciation: [sɛ̃.t‿etjɛn syʁ blɛl], literally Saint-Étienne on Blesle; Occitan: Sent Estefe de Bleila) is a commune in the Haute-Loire department in south-central France.

== Population ==
Historical population
Year	Pop.	±% p.a.
1968	85	—
1975	72	−2.34%
1982	75	+0.58%
1990	79	+0.65%
1999	52	−4.54%
2007	48	−1.00%
2012	52	+1.61%
2017	55	+1.13%
2023	53	−0.62%
Source: INSEE

== See also ==
- Communes of the Haute-Loire department
