= Charles Joret =

French literary historian, philologist and botanist

Charles Joret (14 October 1839, Formigny – 27 December 1914, Paris) was a French literary historian, philologist and botanical author. His name is associated with the so-called ligne Joret (Joret line), a locative boundary used in the linguistics (isogloss) of the Langues d'oïl.

Following studies in Heidelberg and Bonn (1859–60), he taught Latin classes in Saint-Hilaire-du-Harcouët. From 1862 to 1867 he taught German classes at the Lycée in Chambéry. In 1873 he received his diploma from the Ecole Pratique des Hautes Etudes, obtaining a doctorate of letters two years later. From 1877 onward, he was a professor of foreign literature at the Faculté des lettres d’Aix-en-Provence.

In 1887 he became a corresponding member of the Académie des Inscriptions et Belles-Lettres, where from 1901 to 1914 he had the status of membre libre. He was also a member of the Société des antiquaires de Normandie, and in 1902 was elected president of the Société de Linguistique de Paris.

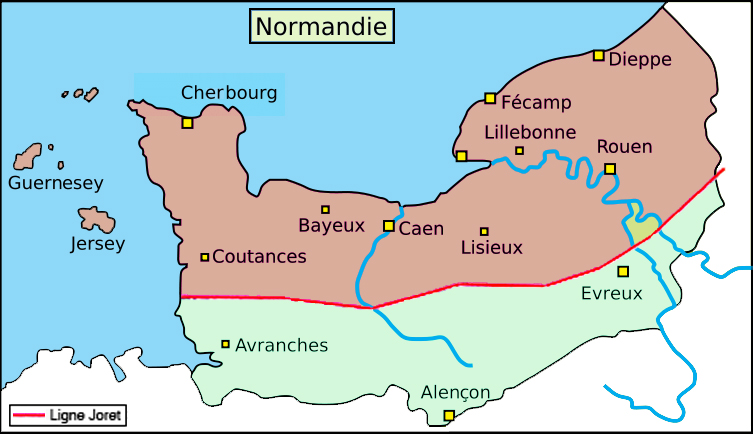
The Joret line

== Selected works ==
- Du c dans les langues romanes, 1874 – The "c" in Romance languages.
- Herder et la renaissance littéraire en Allemagne au XVIIIe siècle, 1875 – Johann Gottfried Herder and the literary renaissance in Germany in the eighteenth century.
- Des caractères et de l'extension du patois normand; étude de phonétique et d'ethnographie, suive d'une carte, 1883 – The characters and the extension of Norman patois, study of phonetics and ethnography.
- Jean-Baptiste Tavernier, écuyer, baron d'Aubonne d'après des documents nouveaux et inédits, 1886 – Jean-Baptiste Tavernier, Esquire, baron of Aubonne from new and unpublished documents.
- La rose dans l'antiquité et au Moyen âge; histoire, légendes et symbolisme, 1892 – The rose in antiquity and in the Middle Ages, history, legends and symbolism.
- Les plantes dans l'antiquité et au moyen âge, 1897 – Plants in antiquity and in the Middle Ages.
- La littérature allemande au XVIII siècle dans ses rapports avec la littérature française et avec la littérature anglaise, German literature in the eighteenth century in its dealings with French and English literature.
- La Bataille de Formigny d'apres les documents contemporains (Paris, 1903) - The battle of Formigny from contemporary documents.
