= Fronreute-Wolpertswende =

- Gemeindeverwaltungsverband
- Location of Fronreute-Wolpertswende within Ravensburg district
- Interactive map of Fronreute-Wolpertswende
- Location within Germany Location within Baden-Württemberg
- Coordinates: 47°54′N 9°37′E
- Country: Germany
- State: Baden-Württemberg
- Admin. region: Tübingen
- District: Ravensburg
- Seat: Wolpertswende
- Subdivisions: 2 municipalities

Area
  - Total: 72.44 km^{2} (27.97 sq mi)

Population (2025-12-31)
  - Total: 9,033
  - Density: 124.7/km^{2} (323.0/sq mi)
- Time zone: UTC+01:00 (CET)
  - Summer (DST): UTC+02:00 (CEST)
- Website: www.gvv-fronreute-wolpertswende.de

Fronreute-Wolpertswende is a Gemeindeverwaltungsverband in the district of Ravensburg in Baden-Württemberg, Germany. The seat of the Gemeindeverwaltungsverband is in Wolpertswende.

The Gemeindeverwaltungsverband Fronreute-Wolpertswende consists of the following municipalities:

1. Fronreute
2. Wolpertswende
