= Torsiac =

- Commune
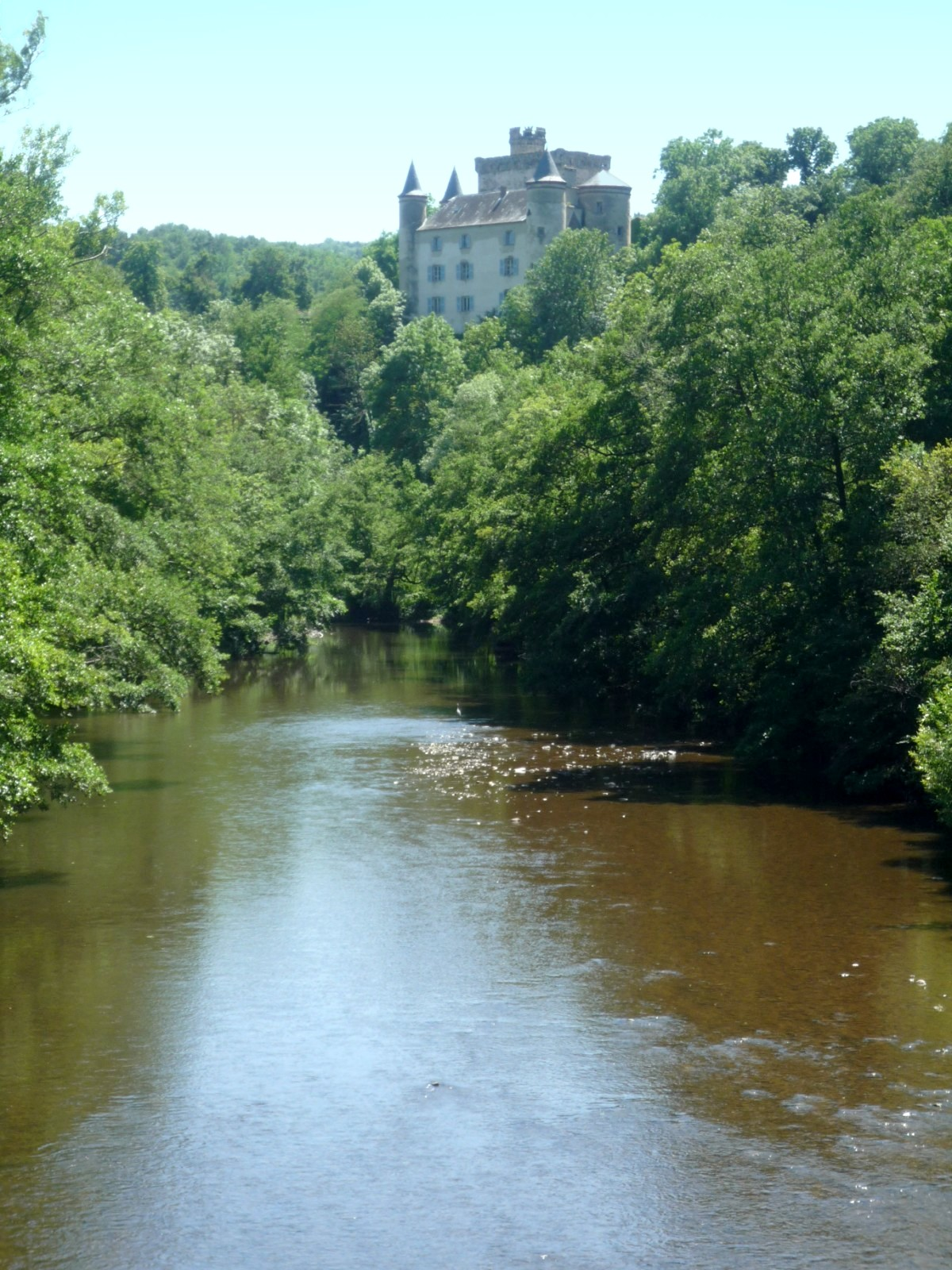
- Château de Torsiac and the river Alagnon
- Location of Torsiac
- Location within France Location within Auvergne-Rhône-Alpes
- Coordinates: 45°21′06″N 3°13′05″E
- Country: France
- Region: Auvergne-Rhône-Alpes
- Department: Haute-Loire
- Arrondissement: Brioude
- Canton: Sainte-Florine

Government
  - Mayor (2020–2026): André Halfon
- Area^{1}: 9.06 km^{2} (3.50 sq mi)
- Elevation: 479 m (1,572 ft)
- Highest elevation: 690 m (2,260 ft)
- Lowest elevation: 460 m (1,510 ft)
- Population (2023): 62
  - Density: 6.8/km^{2} (18/sq mi)
- Time zone: UTC+01:00 (CET)
  - Summer (DST): UTC+02:00 (CEST)
- INSEE/Postal code: 43247 /43450
- ^{1} French Land Register data, which excludes lakes, ponds, glaciers > 1 km^{2} (0.386 sq mi or 247 acres) and river estuaries.

Torsiac (French pronunciation: [tɔʁsjak]) is a commune in the Haute-Loire department in south-central France.

== Population ==
Historical population
Year	Pop.	±% p.a.
1968	80	—
1975	70	−1.89%
1982	78	+1.56%
1990	87	+1.37%
1999	71	−2.23%
2007	73	+0.35%
2012	72	−0.28%
2017	68	−1.14%
2023	62	−1.53%
Source: INSEE

== See also ==
- Communes of the Haute-Loire department
