= Vézézoux =

- Commune
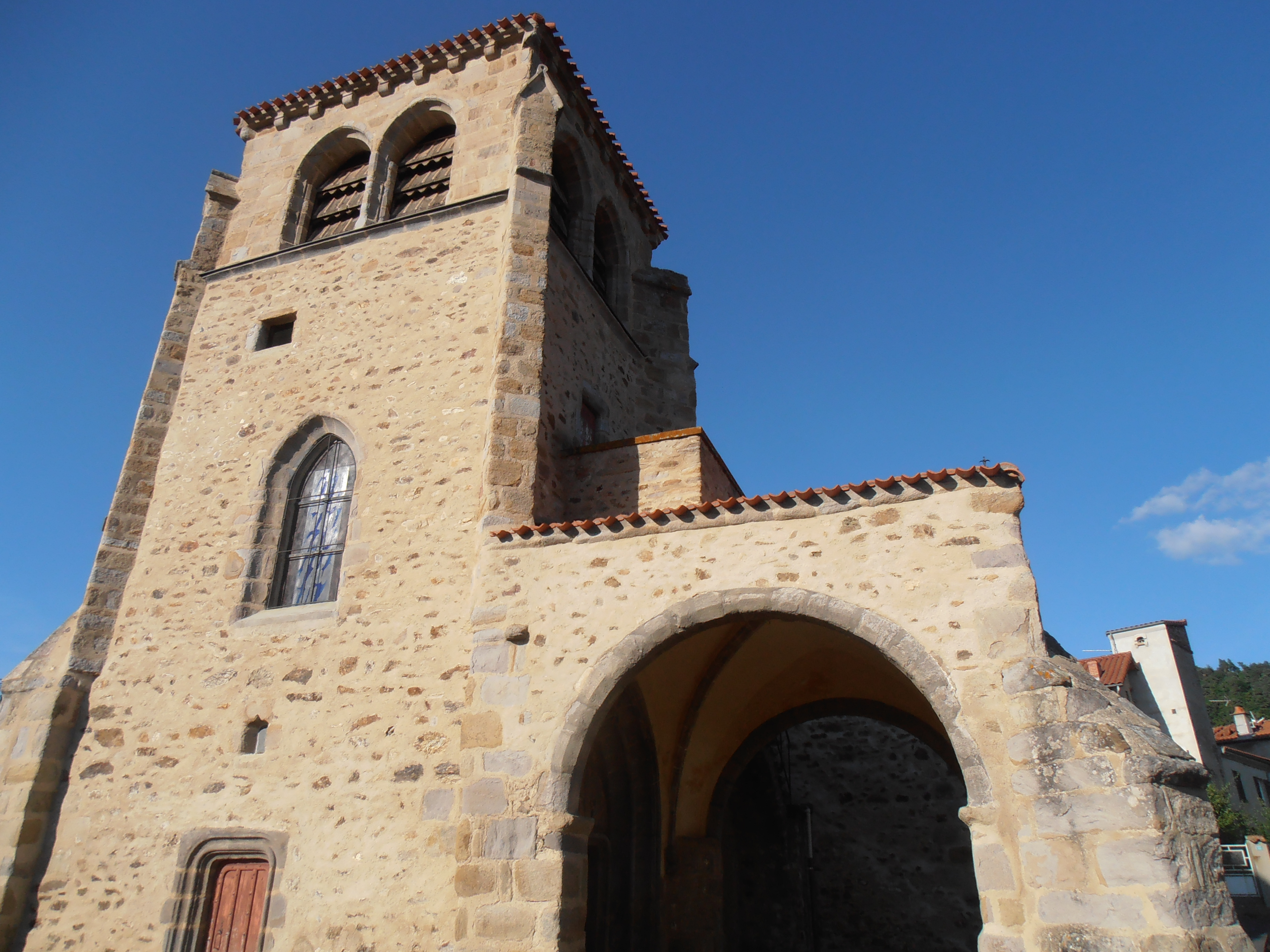
- Location of Vézézoux
- Location within France Location within Auvergne-Rhône-Alpes
- Coordinates: 45°24′15″N 3°20′51″E
- Country: France
- Region: Auvergne-Rhône-Alpes
- Department: Haute-Loire
- Arrondissement: Brioude
- Canton: Sainte-Florine

Government
  - Mayor (2020–2026): Didier Robert
- Area^{1}: 7.13 km^{2} (2.75 sq mi)
- Highest elevation: 638 m (2,093 ft)
- Lowest elevation: 393 m (1,289 ft)
- Population (2023): 635
  - Density: 89.1/km^{2} (231/sq mi)
- Time zone: UTC+01:00 (CET)
  - Summer (DST): UTC+02:00 (CEST)
- INSEE/Postal code: 43261 /43390
- ^{1} French Land Register data, which excludes lakes, ponds, glaciers > 1 km^{2} (0.386 sq mi or 247 acres) and river estuaries.

Vézézoux (French pronunciation: [vezezu]; Occitan: Venesós) is a commune in the Haute-Loire department in south-central France.

== Population ==
Historical population
Year	Pop.	±% p.a.
1968	322	—
1975	312	−0.45%
1982	340	+1.24%
1990	386	+1.60%
1999	407	+0.59%
2007	459	+1.51%
2012	554	+3.83%
2017	593	+1.37%
2023	635	+1.15%
Source: INSEE

== See also ==
- Communes of the Haute-Loire department
