= Autrac =

- Commune
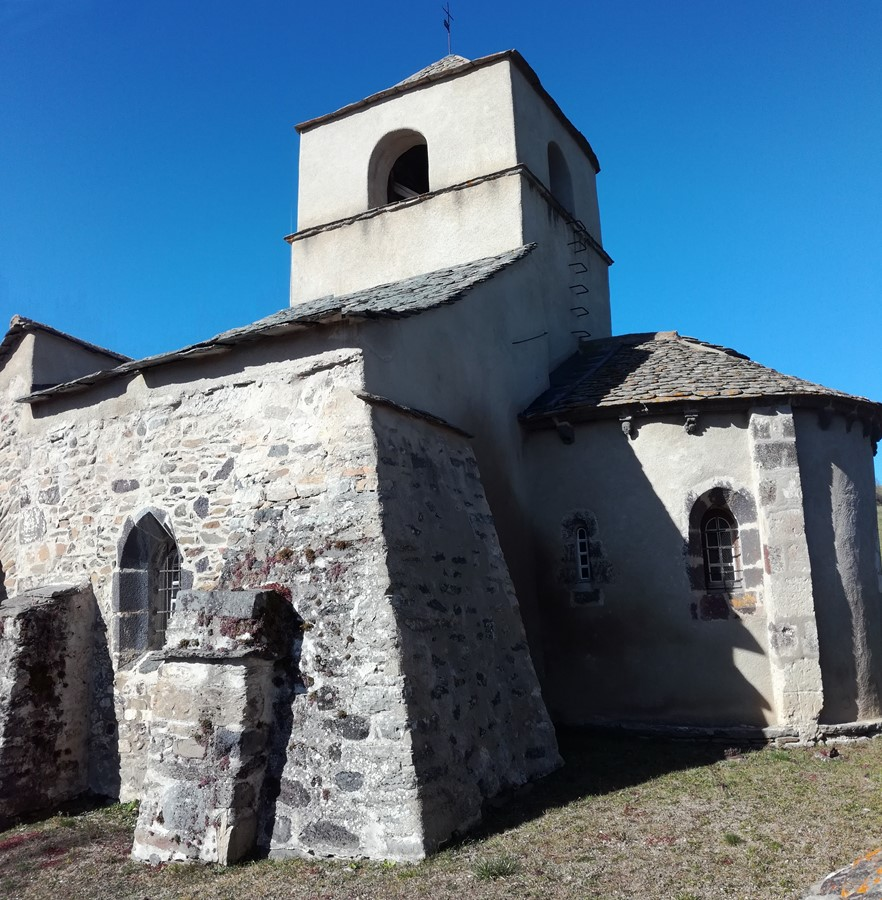
- Location of Autrac
- Location within France Location within Auvergne-Rhône-Alpes
- Coordinates: 45°19′52″N 3°07′59″E
- Country: France
- Region: Auvergne-Rhône-Alpes
- Department: Haute-Loire
- Arrondissement: Brioude
- Canton: Sainte-Florine
- Intercommunality: Brioude Sud Auvergne

Government
  - Mayor (2020–2026): Christophe Bredossian
- Area^{1}: 8.46 km^{2} (3.27 sq mi)
- Elevation: 800 m (2,600 ft)
- Highest elevation: 1,028 m (3,373 ft)
- Lowest elevation: 552 m (1,811 ft)
- Population (2023): 50
  - Density: 5.9/km^{2} (15/sq mi)
- Time zone: UTC+01:00 (CET)
  - Summer (DST): UTC+02:00 (CEST)
- INSEE/Postal code: 43014 /43450
- ^{1} French Land Register data, which excludes lakes, ponds, glaciers > 1 km^{2} (0.386 sq mi or 247 acres) and river estuaries.

Autrac (French pronunciation: [otʁak]) is a commune in the Haute-Loire department in south-central France.

== Population ==
Historical population
Year	Pop.	±% p.a.
1968	75	—
1975	60	−3.14%
1982	61	+0.24%
1990	63	+0.40%
1999	69	+1.02%
2007	70	+0.18%
2012	79	+2.45%
2017	63	−4.43%
2023	50	−3.78%
Source: INSEE

== See also ==
- Communes of the Haute-Loire department
