= Vergongheon =

- Commune
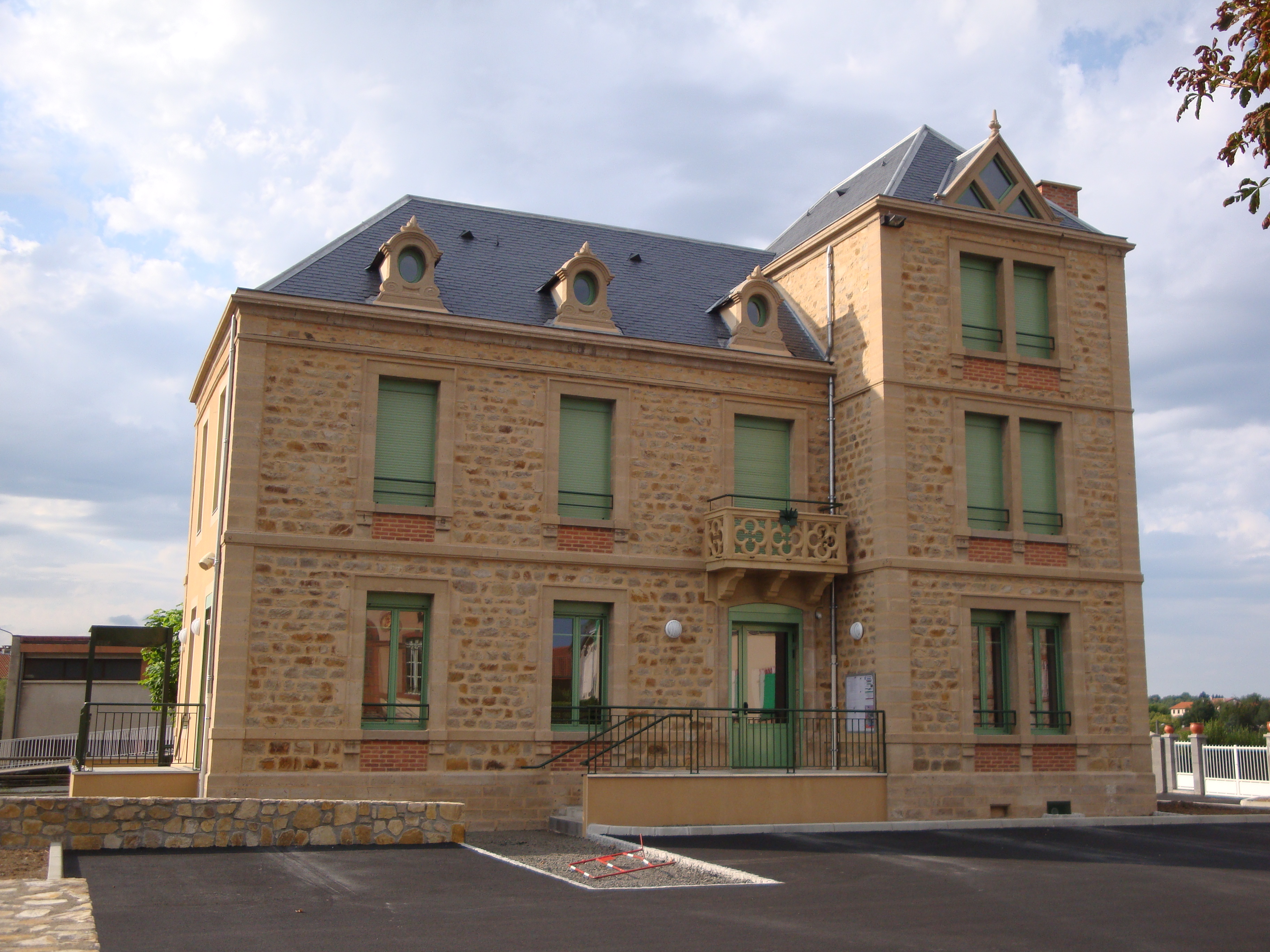
- Town hall
- Location of Vergongheon
- Location within France Location within Auvergne-Rhône-Alpes
- Coordinates: 45°22′19″N 3°19′13″E
- Country: France
- Region: Auvergne-Rhône-Alpes
- Department: Haute-Loire
- Arrondissement: Brioude
- Canton: Sainte-Florine

Government
  - Mayor (2020–2026): Jean-Paul Pastourel
- Area^{1}: 12.61 km^{2} (4.87 sq mi)
- Highest elevation: 483 m (1,585 ft)
- Lowest elevation: 403 m (1,322 ft)
- Population (2023): 1,797
  - Density: 142.5/km^{2} (369.1/sq mi)
- Time zone: UTC+01:00 (CET)
  - Summer (DST): UTC+02:00 (CEST)
- INSEE/Postal code: 43258 /43360
- ^{1} French Land Register data, which excludes lakes, ponds, glaciers > 1 km^{2} (0.386 sq mi or 247 acres) and river estuaries.

Vergongheon (French pronunciation: [vɛʁɡɔ̃ʒɔ̃]; Occitan: Vergonjon) is a commune in the Haute-Loire department in south-central France.

== Population ==
Historical population
Year	Pop.	±% p.a.
1968	1,686	—
1975	1,664	−0.19%
1982	1,859	+1.60%
1990	1,725	−0.93%
1999	1,608	−0.78%
2007	1,766	+1.18%
2012	1,857	+1.01%
2017	1,851	−0.06%
2023	1,797	−0.49%
Source: INSEE

== See also ==
- Communes of the Haute-Loire department
