= Canton of Sainte-Florine =

Coordinates: 45.40°N 3.31°E

The canton of Sainte-Florine is an administrative division of the Haute-Loire department, south-central France. It was created at the French canton reorganisation which came into effect in March 2015. Its seat is in Sainte-Florine.

It consists of the following communes:

1. Agnat
2. Autrac
3. Auzon
4. Azérat
5. Blesle
6. Chambezon
7. Champagnac-le-Vieux
8. Chassignolles
9. Espalem
10. Frugerès-les-Mines
11. Grenier-Montgon
12. Lempdes-sur-Allagnon
13. Léotoing
14. Lorlanges
15. Sainte-Florine
16. Saint-Étienne-sur-Blesle
17. Saint-Hilaire
18. Saint-Vert
19. Torsiac
20. Vergongheon
21. Vézézoux
