= Espalem =

- Commune
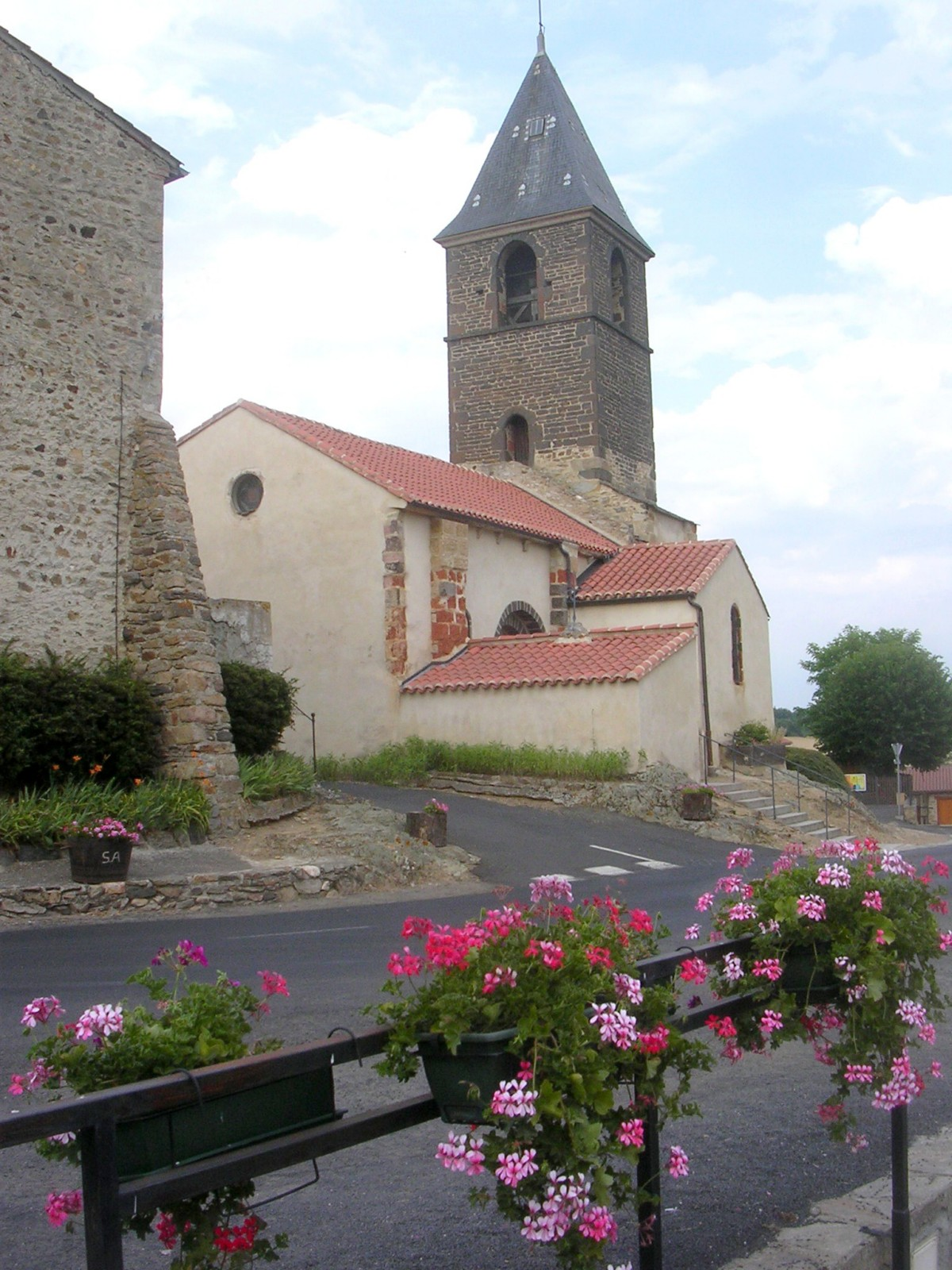
- Location of Espalem
- Location within France Location within Auvergne-Rhône-Alpes
- Coordinates: 45°18′30″N 3°14′01″E
- Country: France
- Region: Auvergne-Rhône-Alpes
- Department: Haute-Loire
- Arrondissement: Brioude
- Canton: Sainte-Florine

Government
  - Mayor (2020–2026): Nathalie Avinin
- Area^{1}: 14.62 km^{2} (5.64 sq mi)
- Elevation: 634 m (2,080 ft)
- Highest elevation: 739 m (2,425 ft)
- Lowest elevation: 580 m (1,900 ft)
- Population (2023): 329
  - Density: 22.5/km^{2} (58.3/sq mi)
- Time zone: UTC+01:00 (CET)
  - Summer (DST): UTC+02:00 (CEST)
- INSEE/Postal code: 43088 /43450
- ^{1} French Land Register data, which excludes lakes, ponds, glaciers > 1 km^{2} (0.386 sq mi or 247 acres) and river estuaries.

Espalem is a commune in the Haute-Loire department in south-central France.

== Population ==
Historical population
Year	Pop.	±% p.a.
1968	244	—
1975	226	−1.09%
1982	213	−0.84%
1990	212	−0.06%
1999	228	+0.81%
2007	254	+1.36%
2012	309	+4.00%
2017	304	−0.33%
2023	329	+1.33%
Source: INSEE

== See also ==
- Communes of the Haute-Loire department
