= Sainte-Florine =

- Commune
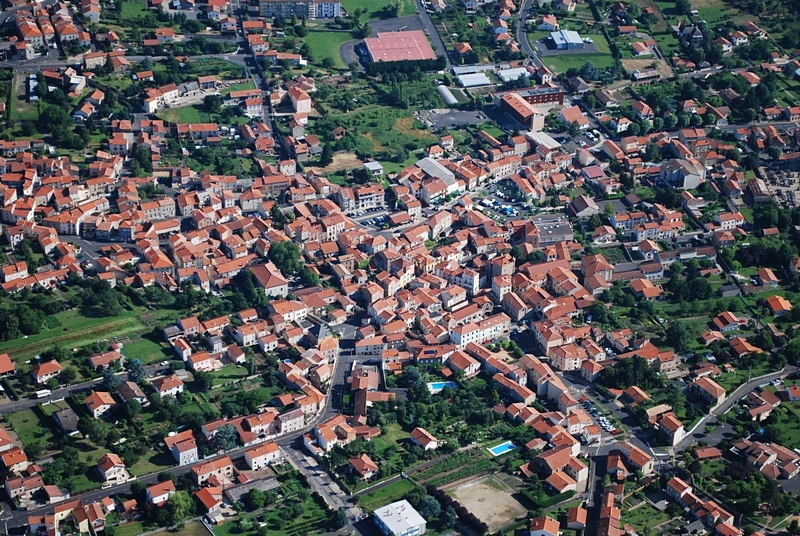
- Location of Sainte-Florine
- Location within France Location within Auvergne-Rhône-Alpes
- Coordinates: 45°24′21″N 3°19′05″E
- Country: France
- Region: Auvergne-Rhône-Alpes
- Department: Haute-Loire
- Arrondissement: Brioude
- Canton: Sainte-Florine

Government
  - Mayor (2020–2026): Raymond Fouret
- Area^{1}: 7.67 km^{2} (2.96 sq mi)
- Elevation: 430 m (1,410 ft)
- Highest elevation: 511 m (1,677 ft)
- Lowest elevation: 400 m (1,300 ft)
- Population (2023): 3,283
  - Density: 428/km^{2} (1,110/sq mi)
- Time zone: UTC+01:00 (CET)
  - Summer (DST): UTC+02:00 (CEST)
- INSEE/Postal code: 43185 /43250
- ^{1} French Land Register data, which excludes lakes, ponds, glaciers > 1 km^{2} (0.386 sq mi or 247 acres) and river estuaries.

Sainte-Florine (French pronunciation: [sɛ̃t flɔʁin]) is a commune in the Haute-Loire department in south-central France.

== Population ==
Historical population

Year	Pop.	±% p.a.
1793	942	—
1821	1,274	+1.08%
1846	1,608	+0.94%
1872	2,181	+1.18%
1901	3,243	+1.38%
1926	2,847	−0.52%
1946	2,755	−0.16%
1962	3,291	+1.12%
1968	3,625	+1.62%

Year	Pop.	±% p.a.
1975	3,673	+0.19%
1982	3,335	−1.37%
1990	3,021	−1.23%
1999	3,002	−0.07%
2007	3,113	+0.45%
2012	3,072	−0.26%
2017	3,154	+0.53%
2023	3,283	+0.67%

Source: EHESS and INSEE (1968-2023)

== See also ==
- Communes of the Haute-Loire department
