= Azérat =

- Commune
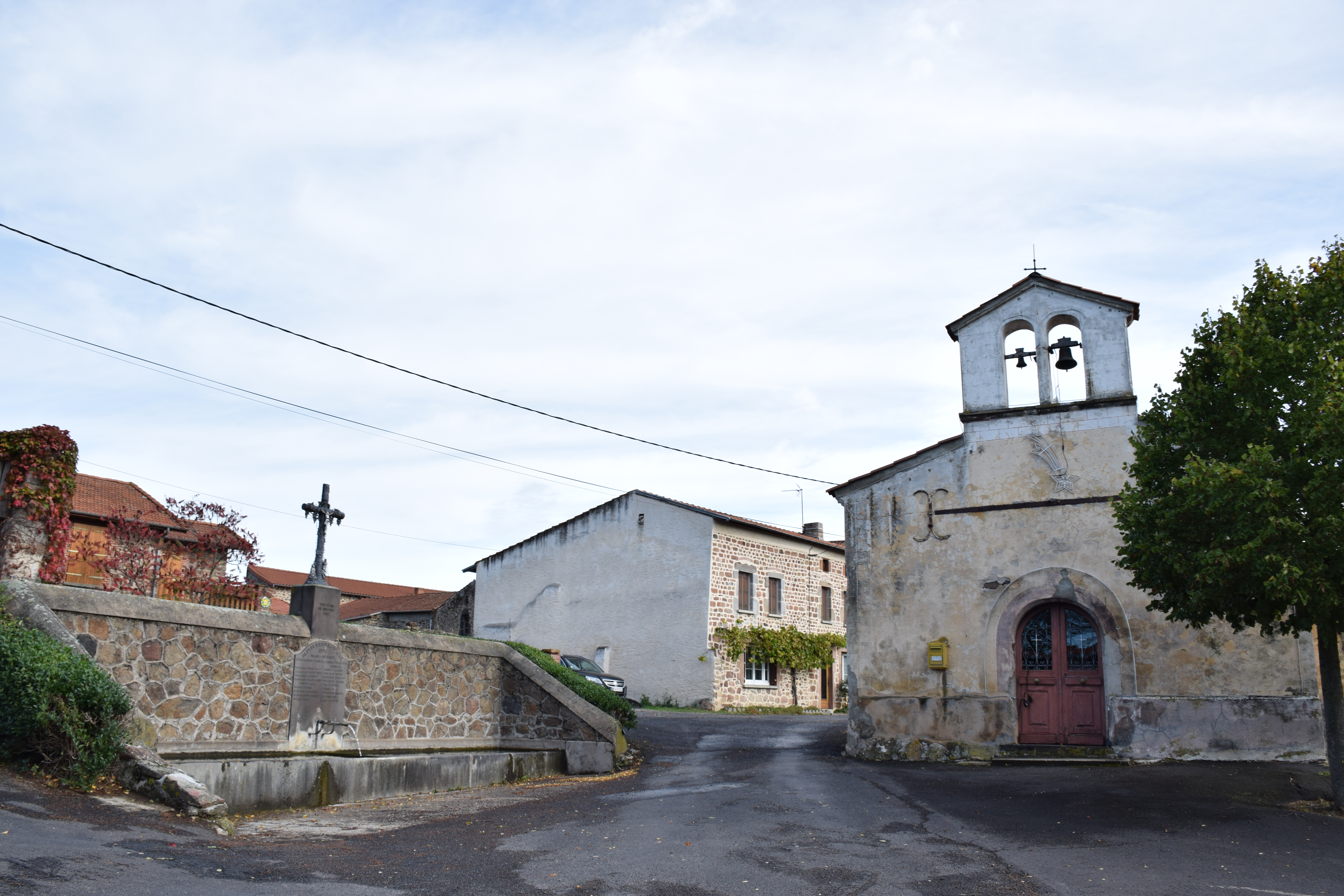
- Location of Azérat
- Location within France Location within Auvergne-Rhône-Alpes
- Coordinates: 45°21′47″N 3°23′00″E
- Country: France
- Region: Auvergne-Rhône-Alpes
- Department: Haute-Loire
- Arrondissement: Brioude
- Canton: Sainte-Florine
- Intercommunality: Auzon Communauté

Government
  - Mayor (2020–2026): Gérard Bonjean
- Area^{1}: 18.11 km^{2} (6.99 sq mi)
- Highest elevation: 661 m (2,169 ft)
- Lowest elevation: 404 m (1,325 ft)
- Population (2023): 294
  - Density: 16.2/km^{2} (42.0/sq mi)
- Time zone: UTC+01:00 (CET)
  - Summer (DST): UTC+02:00 (CEST)
- INSEE/Postal code: 43017 /43390
- ^{1} French Land Register data, which excludes lakes, ponds, glaciers > 1 km^{2} (0.386 sq mi or 247 acres) and river estuaries.

Azérat (French pronunciation: [azeʁa]) is a commune in the Haute-Loire department in south-central France.

== Population ==
Historical population
Year	Pop.	±% p.a.
1968	252	—
1975	234	−1.05%
1982	240	+0.36%
1990	285	+2.17%
1999	274	−0.44%
2007	265	−0.42%
2012	266	+0.08%
2017	273	+0.52%
2023	294	+1.24%
Source: INSEE

== See also ==
- Communes of the Haute-Loire department
