= Terre-Natale =

- Former commune
- Location of Terre-Natale
- Location within France Location within Grand Est
- Coordinates: 47°53′52″N 5°37′31″E
- Country: France
- Region: Grand Est
- Department: Haute-Marne
- Arrondissement: Langres
- Canton: Terre-Natale
- Area^{1}: 23.37 km^{2} (9.02 sq mi)
- Elevation: 360 m (1,180 ft)
- Population (2009): 383
  - Density: 16.4/km^{2} (42.4/sq mi)
- Time zone: UTC+01:00 (CET)
  - Summer (DST): UTC+02:00 (CEST)
- INSEE/Postal code: 52504 /52400
- ^{1} French Land Register data, which excludes lakes, ponds, glaciers > 1 km^{2} (0.386 sq mi or 247 acres) and river estuaries.

Terre-Natale (French pronunciation: [tɛʁ natal], homeland) is a former commune in the Haute-Marne department in north-eastern France. It was formed in 1972 by merging the communes Champigny-sous-Varennes, Chézeaux and Varennes-sur-Amance. Champigny-sous-Varennes became independent in 1986, and the commune was disbanded in 2012. Its population was 383 in 2009.

== See also ==
- Communes of the Haute-Marne department
