= Wolpertswende =

- Municipality
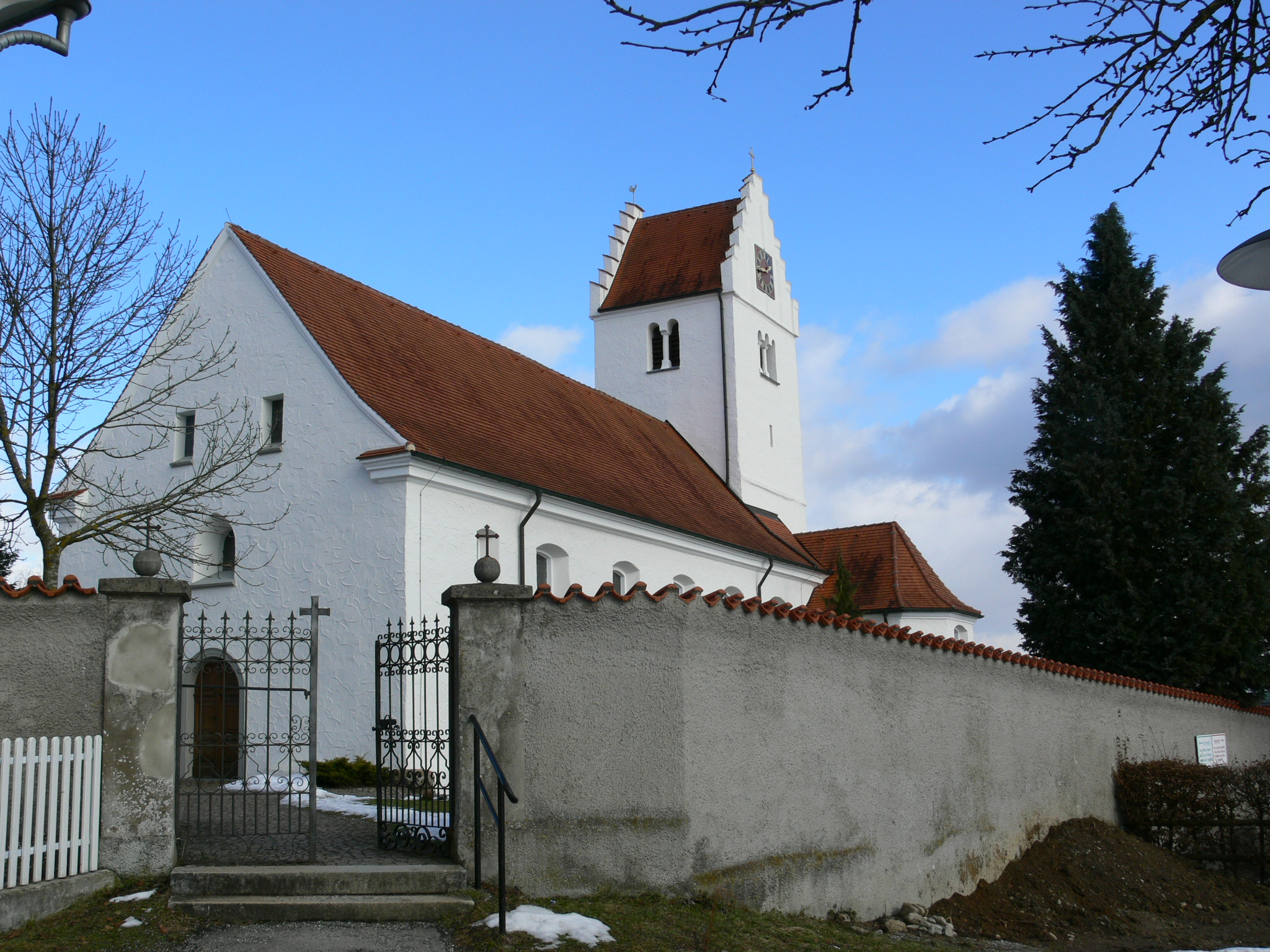
- Church of Saint Gangolf

- Coat of arms

- Location of Wolpertswende within Ravensburg district
- Interactive map of Wolpertswende
- Location within Germany Location within Baden-Württemberg
- Coordinates: 47°53′40″N 09°36′45″E
- Country: Germany
- State: Baden-Württemberg
- Admin. region: Tübingen
- District: Ravensburg
- Municipal assoc.: Fronreute-Wolpertswende
- Subdivisions: 9 Ortsteile

Government
  - Mayor (2018–26): Daniel Steiner (CDU)

Area
  - Total: 26.35 km^{2} (10.17 sq mi)
- Elevation: 569 m (1,867 ft)

Population (2025-12-31)
  - Total: 4,079
  - Density: 154.8/km^{2} (400.9/sq mi)
- Time zone: UTC+01:00 (CET)
  - Summer (DST): UTC+02:00 (CEST)
- Postal codes: 88284
- Dialling codes: 07502
- Vehicle registration: RV
- Website: www.wolpertswende.de

Wolpertswende is a municipality in the district of Ravensburg in Baden-Württemberg in Germany.

== World Heritage Site ==
It is home to one or more prehistoric pile-dwelling (or stilt house) settlements that are part of the Prehistoric Pile dwellings around the Alps UNESCO World Heritage Site.
