= Chézeaux =

- Commune
- Location of Chézeaux
- Location within France Location within Grand Est
- Coordinates: 47°52′33″N 5°38′57″E
- Country: France
- Region: Grand Est
- Department: Haute-Marne
- Arrondissement: Langres
- Canton: Chalindrey

Government
  - Mayor (2020–2026): Daniel Rollin
- Area^{1}: 11.7 km^{2} (4.5 sq mi)
- Population (2023): 76
  - Density: 6.5/km^{2} (17/sq mi)
- Time zone: UTC+01:00 (CET)
  - Summer (DST): UTC+02:00 (CEST)
- INSEE/Postal code: 52124 /52400
- ^{1} French Land Register data, which excludes lakes, ponds, glaciers > 1 km^{2} (0.386 sq mi or 247 acres) and river estuaries.

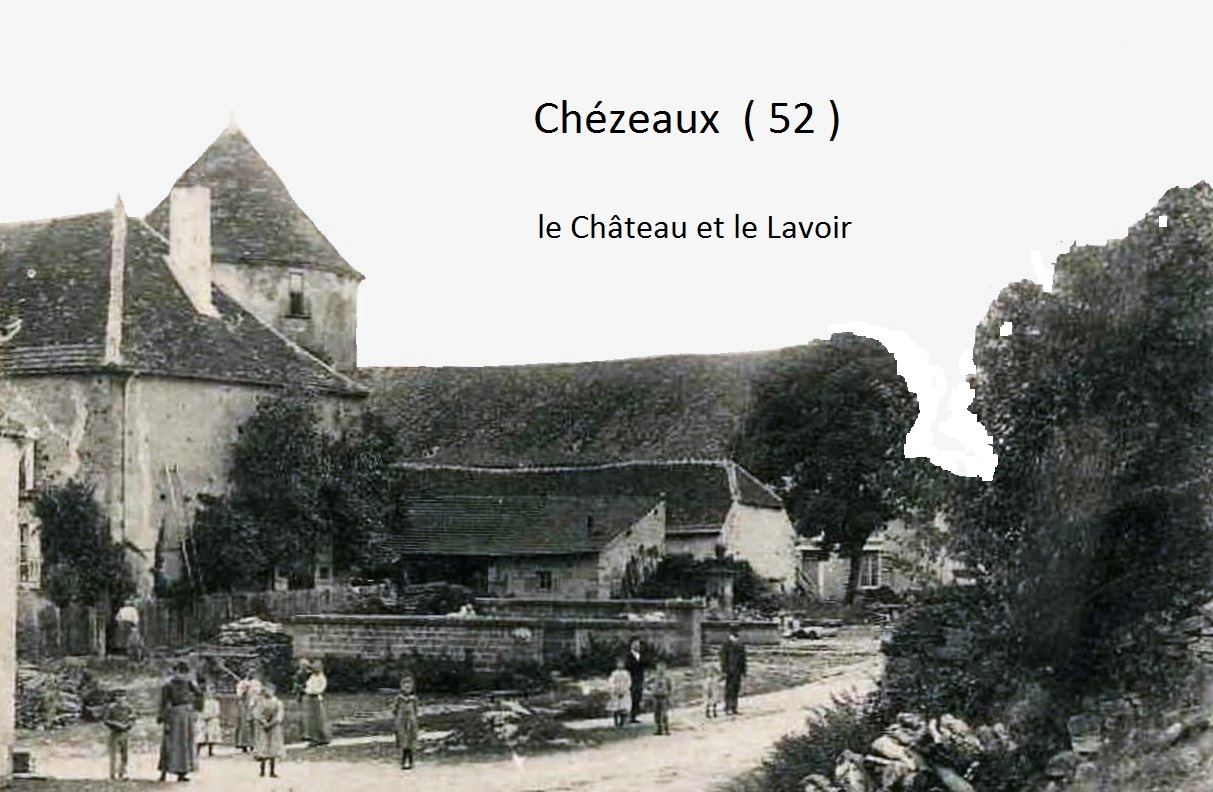
Chézeaux- old view of the Château and the wash house

Chézeaux (French pronunciation: [ʃezo]) is a commune in the Haute-Marne department in north-eastern France. Between 1972 and 2012 it was part of the commune Terre-Natale.

== See also ==
- Communes of the Haute-Marne department
