= Saint-Vert =

- Commune
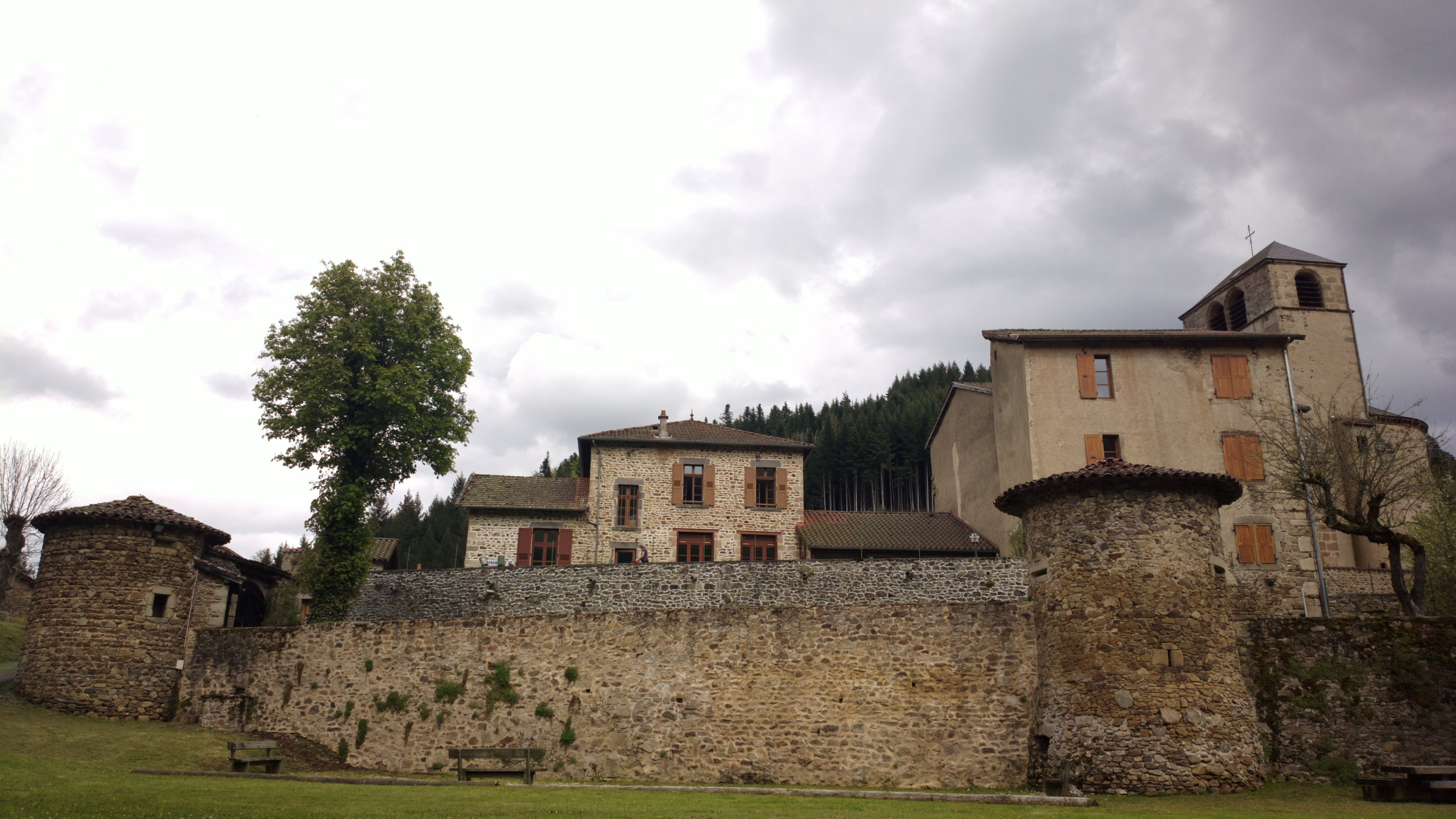
- Location of Saint-Vert
- Location within France Location within Auvergne-Rhône-Alpes
- Coordinates: 45°22′21″N 3°31′58″E
- Country: France
- Region: Auvergne-Rhône-Alpes
- Department: Haute-Loire
- Arrondissement: Brioude
- Canton: Sainte-Florine

Government
  - Mayor (2020–2026): Christian Chaduc
- Area^{1}: 20.67 km^{2} (7.98 sq mi)
- Elevation: 770 m (2,530 ft)
- Highest elevation: 1,132 m (3,714 ft)
- Lowest elevation: 710 m (2,330 ft)
- Population (2023): 108
  - Density: 5.22/km^{2} (13.5/sq mi)
- Time zone: UTC+01:00 (CET)
  - Summer (DST): UTC+02:00 (CEST)
- INSEE/Postal code: 43226 /43440
- ^{1} French Land Register data, which excludes lakes, ponds, glaciers > 1 km^{2} (0.386 sq mi or 247 acres) and river estuaries.

Saint-Vert (French pronunciation: [sɛ̃ vɛʁ]) is a commune in the Haute-Loire department in south-central France.

== Population ==
Historical population
Year	Pop.	±% p.a.
1968	180	—
1975	151	−2.48%
1982	135	−1.59%
1990	120	−1.46%
1999	103	−1.68%
2007	104	+0.12%
2012	110	+1.13%
2017	112	+0.36%
2023	108	−0.60%
Source: INSEE

== See also ==
- Communes of the Haute-Loire department
