= Lorlanges =

- Commune
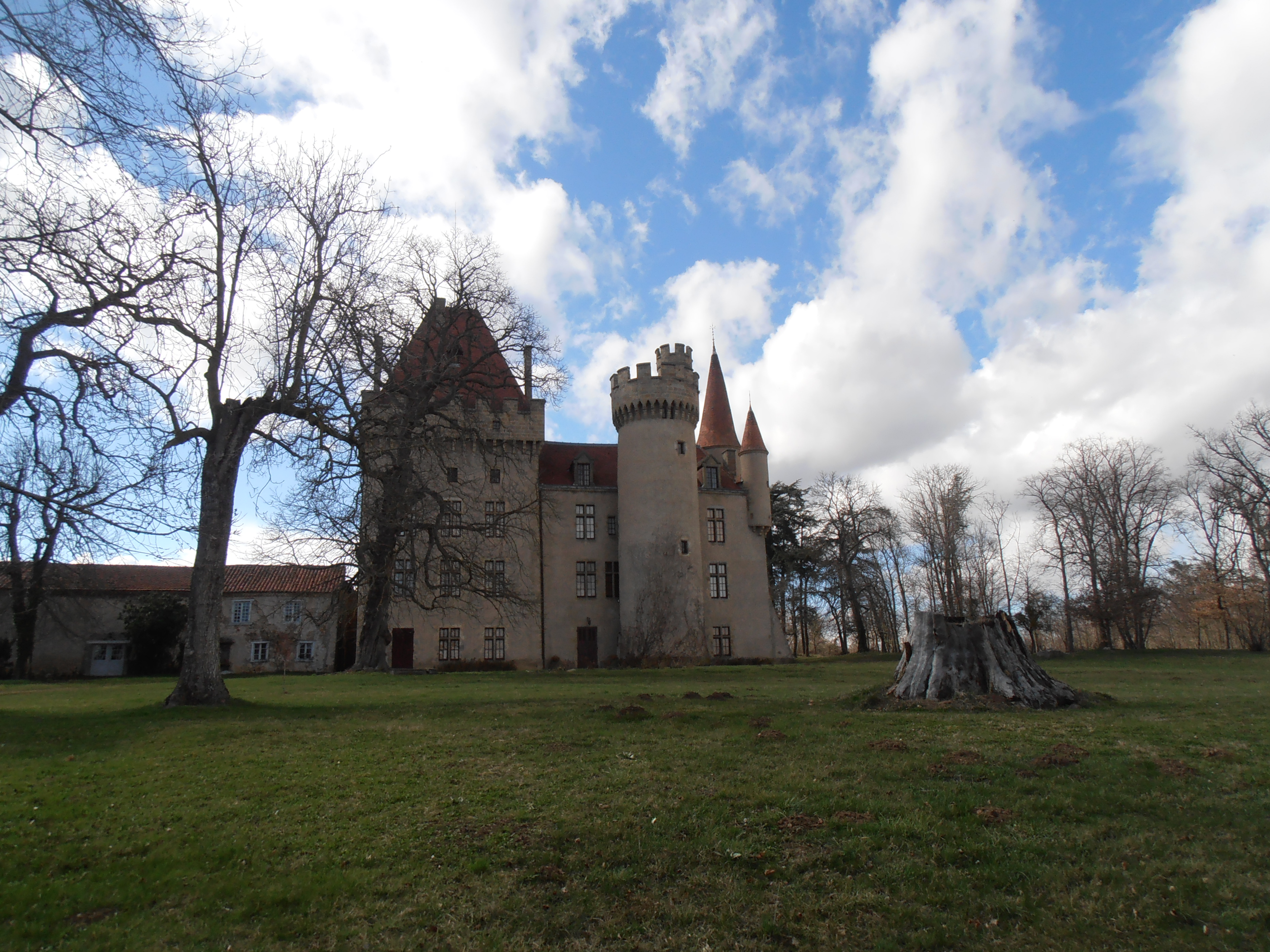
- Château de Védrines
- Location of Lorlanges
- Location within France Location within Auvergne-Rhône-Alpes
- Coordinates: 45°20′12″N 3°16′02″E
- Country: France
- Region: Auvergne-Rhône-Alpes
- Department: Haute-Loire
- Arrondissement: Brioude
- Canton: Sainte-Florine

Government
  - Mayor (2020–2026): Didier Soulier
- Area^{1}: 14.49 km^{2} (5.59 sq mi)
- Elevation: 550 m (1,800 ft)
- Highest elevation: 682 m (2,238 ft)
- Lowest elevation: 523 m (1,716 ft)
- Population (2023): 425
  - Density: 29.3/km^{2} (76.0/sq mi)
- Time zone: UTC+01:00 (CET)
  - Summer (DST): UTC+02:00 (CEST)
- INSEE/Postal code: 43123 /43360
- ^{1} French Land Register data, which excludes lakes, ponds, glaciers > 1 km^{2} (0.386 sq mi or 247 acres) and river estuaries.

Lorlanges (French pronunciation: [lɔʁlɑ̃ʒ]; Occitan: Lorlanja) is a commune in the Haute-Loire department in south-central France.

== Population ==
Historical population
Year	Pop.	±% p.a.
1968	284	—
1975	247	−1.97%
1982	216	−1.90%
1990	230	+0.79%
1999	241	+0.52%
2007	270	+1.43%
2012	336	+4.47%
2017	374	+2.17%
2023	425	+2.15%
Source: INSEE

== See also ==
- Communes of the Haute-Loire department
