= Agnat =

- Commune
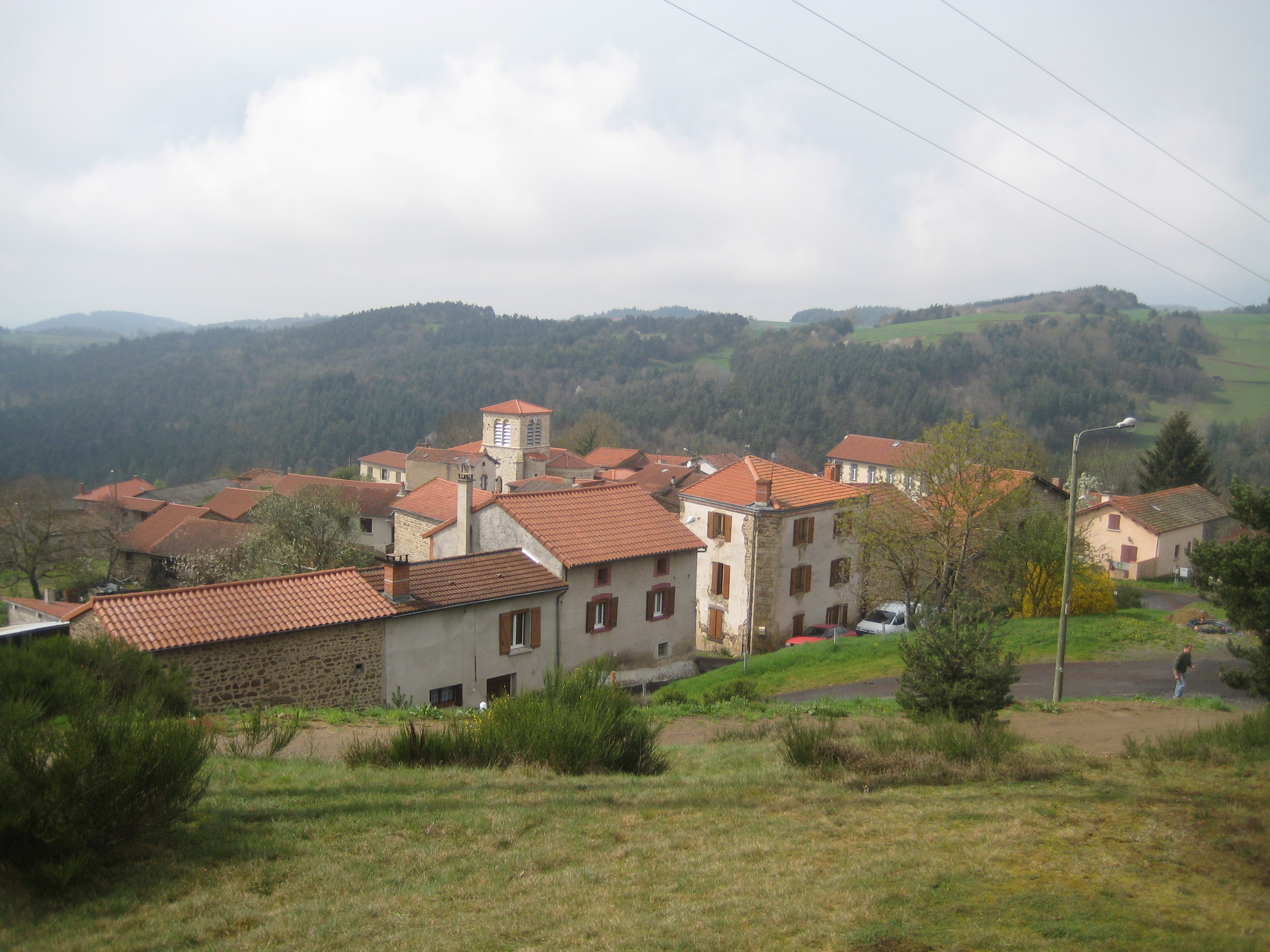
- Location of Agnat
- Location within France Location within Auvergne-Rhône-Alpes
- Coordinates: 45°20′39″N 3°26′58″E
- Country: France
- Region: Auvergne-Rhône-Alpes
- Department: Haute-Loire
- Arrondissement: Brioude
- Canton: Sainte-Florine
- Intercommunality: Brioude Sud Auvergne

Government
  - Mayor (2020–2026): Christian Passemard
- Area^{1}: 19.65 km^{2} (7.59 sq mi)
- Elevation: 667 m (2,188 ft)
- Highest elevation: 860 m (2,820 ft)
- Lowest elevation: 445 m (1,460 ft)
- Population (2023): 170
  - Density: 8.7/km^{2} (22/sq mi)
- Time zone: UTC+01:00 (CET)
  - Summer (DST): UTC+02:00 (CEST)
- INSEE/Postal code: 43001 /43100
- ^{1} French Land Register data, which excludes lakes, ponds, glaciers > 1 km^{2} (0.386 sq mi or 247 acres) and river estuaries.

Agnat (French pronunciation: [aɡna]; Occitan: Anhac) is a commune in the Haute-Loire department and Auvergne-Rhône-Alpes region of south-east central France.

== Population ==
Historical population
Year	Pop.	±% p.a.
1968	316	—
1975	302	−0.65%
1982	251	−2.61%
1990	222	−1.52%
1999	209	−0.67%
2007	189	−1.25%
2012	189	+0.00%
2017	187	−0.21%
2023	170	−1.58%
Source: INSEE

== See also ==
- Communes of the Haute-Loire department
