= Champagnac =

Champagnac may refer to the following communes in France:

- Champagnac, Cantal, in the Cantal département
- Champagnac, Charente-Maritime, in the Charente-Maritime département
- Champagnac-de-Belair, in the Dordogne département
- Champagnac-la-Noaille, in the Corrèze département
- Champagnac-la-Prune, in the Corrèze département
- Champagnac-la-Rivière, in the Haute-Vienne département
- Champagnac-le-Vieux, in the Haute-Loire département
