= Saint-Hilaire, Haute-Loire =

Saint-Hilaire
- Commune
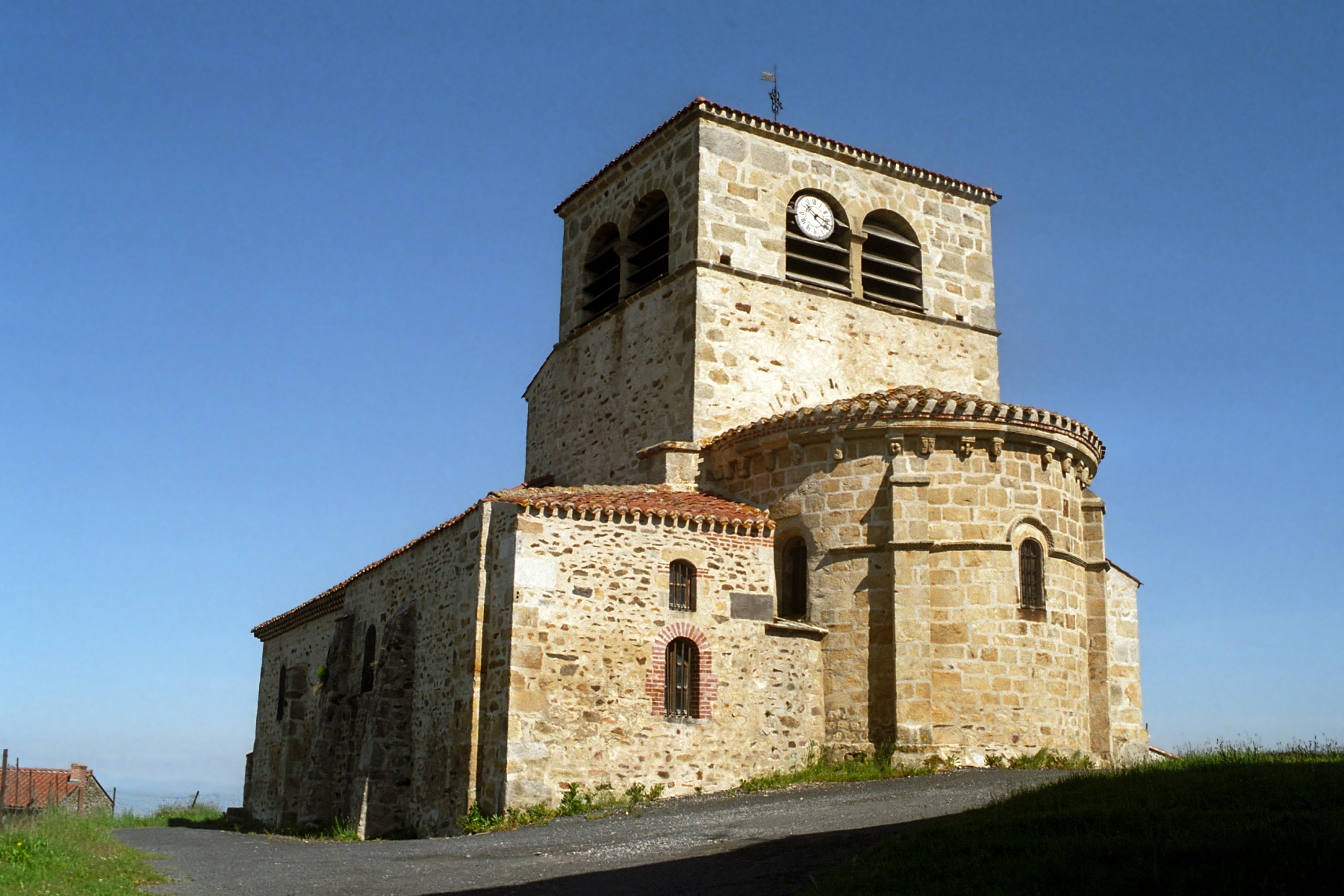
- Church of Saint-Hilaire

- Coat of arms
- Location of Saint-Hilaire
- Location within France Location within Auvergne-Rhône-Alpes
- Coordinates: 45°22′54″N 3°26′18″E
- Country: France
- Region: Auvergne-Rhône-Alpes
- Department: Haute-Loire
- Arrondissement: Brioude
- Canton: Sainte-Florine

Government
  - Mayor (2020–2026): Dominique Ceres
- Area^{1}: 14.64 km^{2} (5.65 sq mi)
- Elevation: 750 m (2,460 ft)
- Highest elevation: 884 m (2,900 ft)
- Lowest elevation: 519 m (1,703 ft)
- Population (2023): 157
  - Density: 10.7/km^{2} (27.8/sq mi)
- Time zone: UTC+01:00 (CET)
  - Summer (DST): UTC+02:00 (CEST)
- INSEE/Postal code: 43193 /43390
- ^{1} French Land Register data, which excludes lakes, ponds, glaciers > 1 km^{2} (0.386 sq mi or 247 acres) and river estuaries.

Saint-Hilaire (French pronunciation: [sɛ̃.t‿ilɛʁ]; Occitan: Sant Alari) is a commune in the Haute-Loire department in south-central France.

== Population ==
Historical population
| Year | Pop. | ±% p.a. |
|---|---|---|
| 1968 | 217 | — |
| 1975 | 200 | −1.16% |
| 1982 | 205 | +0.35% |
| 1990 | 197 | −0.50% |
| 1999 | 190 | −0.40% |
| 2007 | 192 | +0.13% |
| 2012 | 173 | −2.06% |
| 2017 | 158 | −1.80% |
| 2023 | 157 | −0.11% |
Source: INSEE

== See also ==
- Communes of the Haute-Loire department
