= Grenier-Montgon =

- Commune
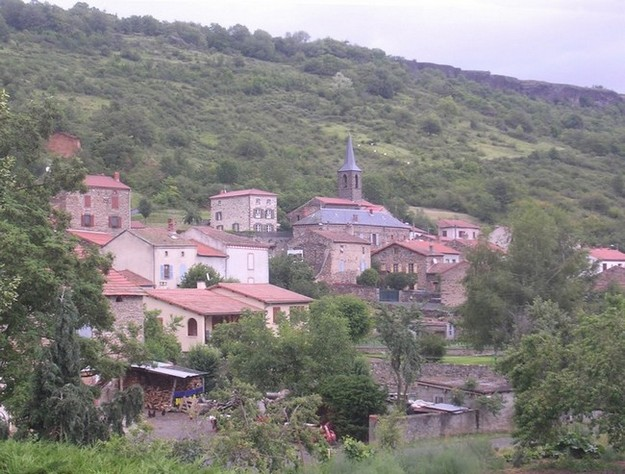
- Village of Grenier
- Location of Grenier-Montgon
- Location within France Location within Auvergne-Rhône-Alpes
- Coordinates: 45°17′19″N 3°11′44″E
- Country: France
- Region: Auvergne-Rhône-Alpes
- Department: Haute-Loire
- Arrondissement: Brioude
- Canton: Sainte-Florine

Government
  - Mayor (2020–2026): Jacques Filiol
- Area^{1}: 5.01 km^{2} (1.93 sq mi)
- Highest elevation: 694 m (2,277 ft)
- Lowest elevation: 504 m (1,654 ft)
- Population (2023): 112
  - Density: 22.4/km^{2} (57.9/sq mi)
- Time zone: UTC+01:00 (CET)
  - Summer (DST): UTC+02:00 (CEST)
- INSEE/Postal code: 43103 /43450
- ^{1} French Land Register data, which excludes lakes, ponds, glaciers > 1 km^{2} (0.386 sq mi or 247 acres) and river estuaries.

Grenier-Montgon (French pronunciation: [ɡʁənje mɔ̃ɡɔ̃]) is a commune in the Haute-Loire department in south-central France.

== Population ==
Historical population
Year	Pop.	±% p.a.
1968	120	—
1975	133	+1.48%
1982	149	+1.64%
1990	129	−1.79%
1999	123	−0.53%
2007	115	−0.84%
2012	116	+0.17%
2017	115	−0.17%
2023	112	−0.44%
Source: INSEE

== See also ==
- Communes of the Haute-Loire department
