= Auzon =

- Commune
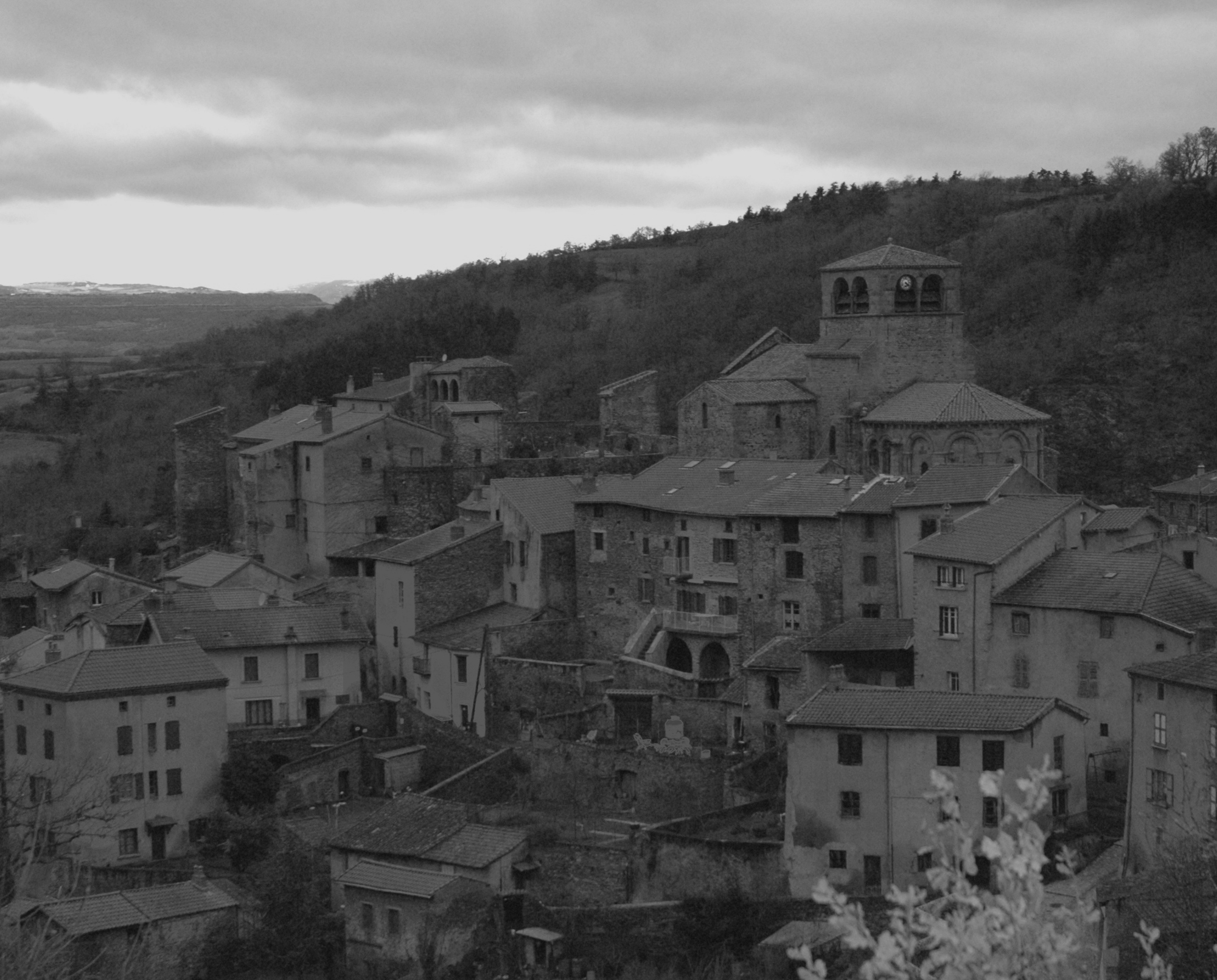
- Citadel

- Coat of arms
- Location of Auzon
- Location within France Location within Auvergne-Rhône-Alpes
- Coordinates: 45°23′33″N 3°22′21″E
- Country: France
- Region: Auvergne-Rhône-Alpes
- Department: Haute-Loire
- Arrondissement: Brioude
- Canton: Sainte-Florine
- Intercommunality: Auzon Communauté

Government
  - Mayor (2023–2026): Giovanni Piludu
- Area^{1}: 16.96 km^{2} (6.55 sq mi)
- Highest elevation: 755 m (2,477 ft)
- Lowest elevation: 400 m (1,300 ft)
- Population (2023): 858
  - Density: 50.6/km^{2} (131/sq mi)
- Time zone: UTC+01:00 (CET)
  - Summer (DST): UTC+02:00 (CEST)
- INSEE/Postal code: 43016 /43390
- ^{1} French Land Register data, which excludes lakes, ponds, glaciers > 1 km^{2} (0.386 sq mi or 247 acres) and river estuaries.

Auzon (French pronunciation: [ozɔ̃]; Occitan: Auson) is a commune in the Haute-Loire department in south-central France.

== Population ==
Historical population
Year	Pop.	±% p.a.
1968	1,007	—
1975	1,071	+0.88%
1982	1,047	−0.32%
1990	920	−1.60%
1999	817	−1.31%
2007	916	+1.44%
2012	886	−0.66%
2017	896	+0.22%
2023	858	−0.72%
Source: INSEE

== See also ==
- Communes of the Haute-Loire department
- Franks Casket
