= Champagnat =

Champagnat may refer to the following places in France:

- Champagnat, Creuse, in the Creuse department
- Champagnat, Saône-et-Loire, in the Saône-et-Loire department
- Champagnat-le-Jeune, in the Puy-de-Dôme department

== See also ==
- Marcellin Champagnat (1789–1840), founder of the Marist Brothers
- Club Champagnat, rugby union club in Buenos Aires, Argentina
- Club Champagnat, rugby union club in Montevideo, Uruguay
