= Marcel Arland =

French novelist, literary critic, and journalist

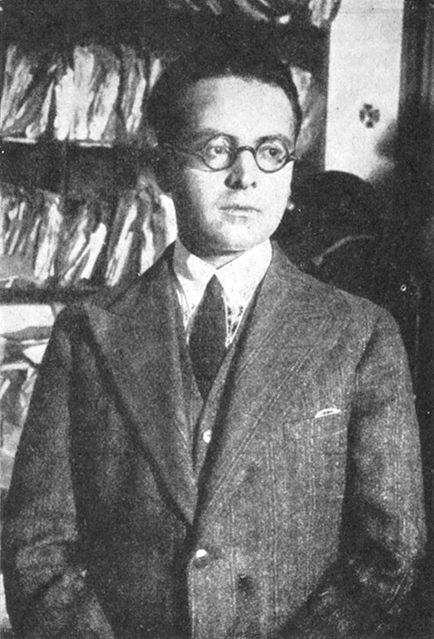
Marcel Arland, before 1929

Marcel Arland (5 July 1899, Varennes-sur-Amance, Haute-Marne – 12 January 1986, Haute-Marne) was a French novelist, literary critic, and journalist.

== Biography ==
With René Crevel and Roger Vitrac he founded the dadaist newspaper Aventure. He was awarded the Prix Goncourt for L'Ordre in 1929, and was elected to the French academy in 1968. He directed the Nouvelle Revue Française from 1968 to 1977.

== Works ==
- Terres étrangères (1923)
- Étienne (1925)
- Monique (1926)
- Les Âmes en peine (1927)
- L'Ordre (1929) (Prix Goncourt)
- Antarès (1932)
- Les Vivants (1934)
- La Vigie (1935)
- Les Plus Beaux de nos jours (1937)
- Terre natale (1938)
- La Grâce (1941)
- Zélie dans le désert (1944)
- Il faut de tout pour faire un monde (1947)
- Sidobre (1949)
- Essais et nouveaux essais critiques (1952)
- Je vous écris... (1960)
- L'Eau et le feu (1960)
- Je vous écris... La nuit et les sources (1963)
- Le Grand Pardon (1965)
- Attendez l'aube (1970)
