= Champigny-sous-Varennes =

- Commune
- Coat of arms
- Location of Champigny-sous-Varennes
- Location within France Location within Grand Est
- Coordinates: 47°52′03″N 5°38′36″E
- Country: France
- Region: Grand Est
- Department: Haute-Marne
- Arrondissement: Langres
- Canton: Chalindrey
- Intercommunality: Savoir-Faire

Government
  - Mayor (2020–2026): Eric Fallot
- Area^{1}: 5.84 km^{2} (2.25 sq mi)
- Elevation: 360 m (1,180 ft)
- Population (2023): 134
  - Density: 22.9/km^{2} (59.4/sq mi)
- Time zone: UTC+01:00 (CET)
  - Summer (DST): UTC+02:00 (CEST)
- INSEE/Postal code: 52103 /52400
- ^{1} French Land Register data, which excludes lakes, ponds, glaciers > 1 km^{2} (0.386 sq mi or 247 acres) and river estuaries.

Champigny-sous-Varennes (French pronunciation: [ʃɑ̃piɲi su vaʁɛn], lit. 'Champigny under Varennes') is a commune in the Haute-Marne department in north-eastern France. Between 1972 and 1986 it was part of the commune Terre-Natale.

== See also ==
- Communes of the Haute-Marne department
