= Campagnac =

Campagnac is the name or part of the name of the following communes in France:

- Campagnac, Aveyron, in the Aveyron department
- Campagnac, Tarn, in the Tarn department
- Campagnac-lès-Quercy, in the Dordogne department
