= Champigny, Quebec City =

- Interactive map of Champigny, Quebec City
- Coordinates: 46°47′00″N 71°21′00″W
- Country: Canada
- Province: Quebec
- City: Quebec City
- Borough: Sainte-Foy–Sillery–Cap-Rouge

Champigny is an administrative sector and neighbourhood of Quebec City. It is also the name of a sub-sub-fief on the île d'Orléans in the era of New France that may have give its name to the neighbourhood. Also located here are Champigny Park, Champigny Street East and Champigny Street West. The two Champigny Streets were formerly Champigny Road, part of the Chemin du Roy from Quebec City to Montreal.

Champigny is also the name of Jean Bochart de Champigny, sieur de Noroy et Verneuil, chevalier and intendant of New France from 1687 to 1702. It is unclear whether the neighbourhood is named after the sub-sub-fief or the intendant.

== Références ==
- Bouchard, René et al, Itinéraire toponymique du chemin du Roy : Québec-Montréal, Québec, Commission de toponymie, 1981, p. 13.
- Société d'histoire de Sainte-Foy, Normalisation des odonymes : historique de chacun des noms de rues de de la ville de Sainte-Foy, 1993.
- "Québec - secteur de Champigny, Quebec, Canada Air Pollution: Real-time Air Quality Index". The World Air Quality Index project.
- Ricard-Châtelain, Baptiste (2021-05-26). "La caserne Champigny démolie cet été, les pompiers relocalisés". Le Soleil (in French).
