= Champagney =

Champagney may refer to three communes in France, in the region of Franche-Comté:

- Champagney, Doubs
- Champagney, Jura
- Champagney, Haute-Saône
