= Chassignolles, Haute-Loire =

Chassignolles
- Commune
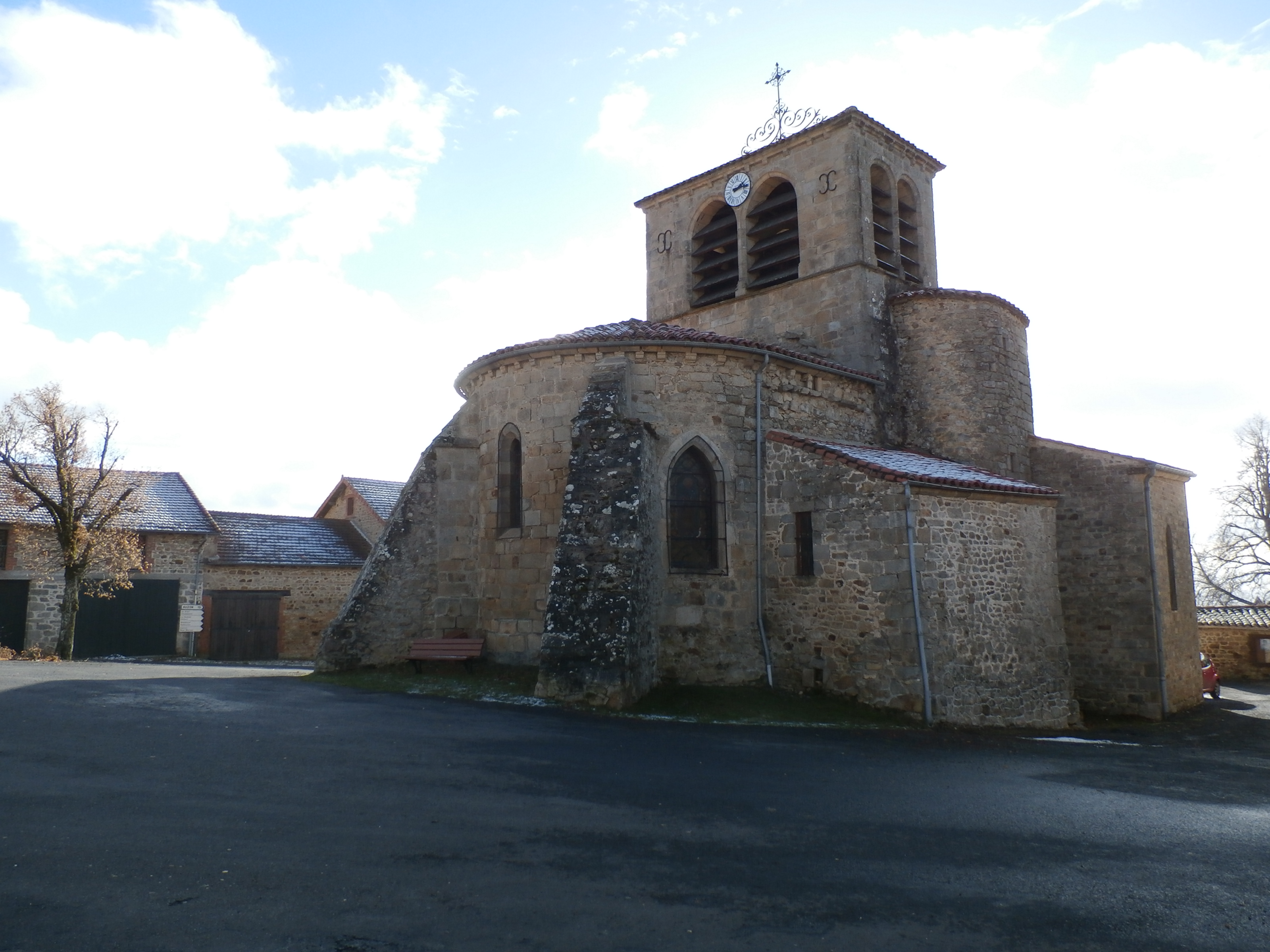

- Coat of arms
- Location of Chassignolles
- Location within France Location within Auvergne-Rhône-Alpes
- Coordinates: 45°23′52″N 3°29′35″E
- Country: France
- Region: Auvergne-Rhône-Alpes
- Department: Haute-Loire
- Arrondissement: Brioude
- Canton: Sainte-Florine

Government
  - Mayor (2020–2026): Michel Clémensat
- Area^{1}: 18.27 km^{2} (7.05 sq mi)
- Highest elevation: 1,100 m (3,600 ft)
- Lowest elevation: 666 m (2,185 ft)
- Population (2023): 64
  - Density: 3.5/km^{2} (9.1/sq mi)
- Time zone: UTC+01:00 (CET)
  - Summer (DST): UTC+02:00 (CEST)
- INSEE/Postal code: 43064 /43440
- ^{1} French Land Register data, which excludes lakes, ponds, glaciers > 1 km^{2} (0.386 sq mi or 247 acres) and river estuaries.

Chassignolles (French pronunciation: [ʃasiɲɔl]; Occitan: Chassinhòla) is a commune in the Haute-Loire department in south-central France.

== Population ==
Historical population
Year	Pop.	±% p.a.
1968	219	—
1975	191	−1.94%
1982	157	−2.76%
1990	109	−4.46%
1999	84	−2.85%
2007	87	+0.44%
2012	74	−3.19%
2017	62	−3.48%
2023	64	+0.53%
Source: INSEE

== See also ==
- Communes of the Haute-Loire department
