= Champagnac-le-Vieux =

- Commune
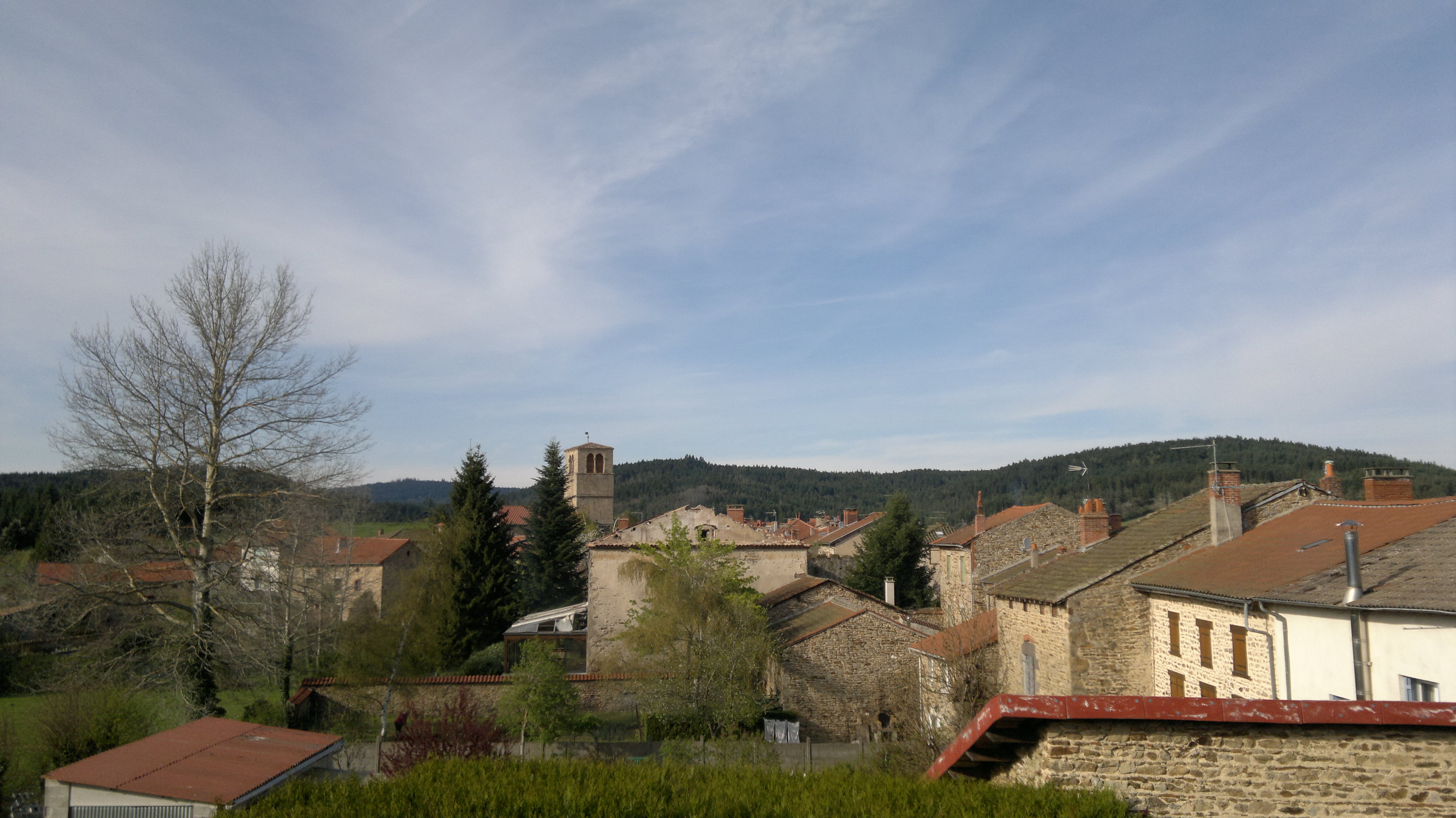

- Coat of arms
- Location of Champagnac-le-Vieux
- Location within France Location within Auvergne-Rhône-Alpes
- Coordinates: 45°21′31″N 3°30′13″E
- Country: France
- Region: Auvergne-Rhône-Alpes
- Department: Haute-Loire
- Arrondissement: Brioude
- Canton: Sainte-Florine
- Intercommunality: Auzon Communauté

Government
  - Mayor (2020–2026): Évelyne Miche
- Area^{1}: 20.61 km^{2} (7.96 sq mi)
- Highest elevation: 980 m (3,220 ft)
- Lowest elevation: 640 m (2,100 ft)
- Population (2023): 191
  - Density: 9.27/km^{2} (24.0/sq mi)
- Time zone: UTC+01:00 (CET)
  - Summer (DST): UTC+02:00 (CEST)
- INSEE/Postal code: 43052 /43440
- ^{1} French Land Register data, which excludes lakes, ponds, glaciers > 1 km^{2} (0.386 sq mi or 247 acres) and river estuaries.

Champagnac-le-Vieux (French pronunciation: [ʃɑ̃paɲak lə vjø]; Occitan: Champanhac lo Velh) is a commune in the Haute-Loire department and Auvergne-Rhône-Alpes region of south-east central France.

== Population ==
Historical population
Year	Pop.	±% p.a.
1968	486	—
1975	415	−2.23%
1982	340	−2.81%
1990	301	−1.51%
1999	277	−0.92%
2007	241	−1.73%
2012	229	−1.02%
2017	206	−2.09%
2023	191	−1.25%
Source: INSEE

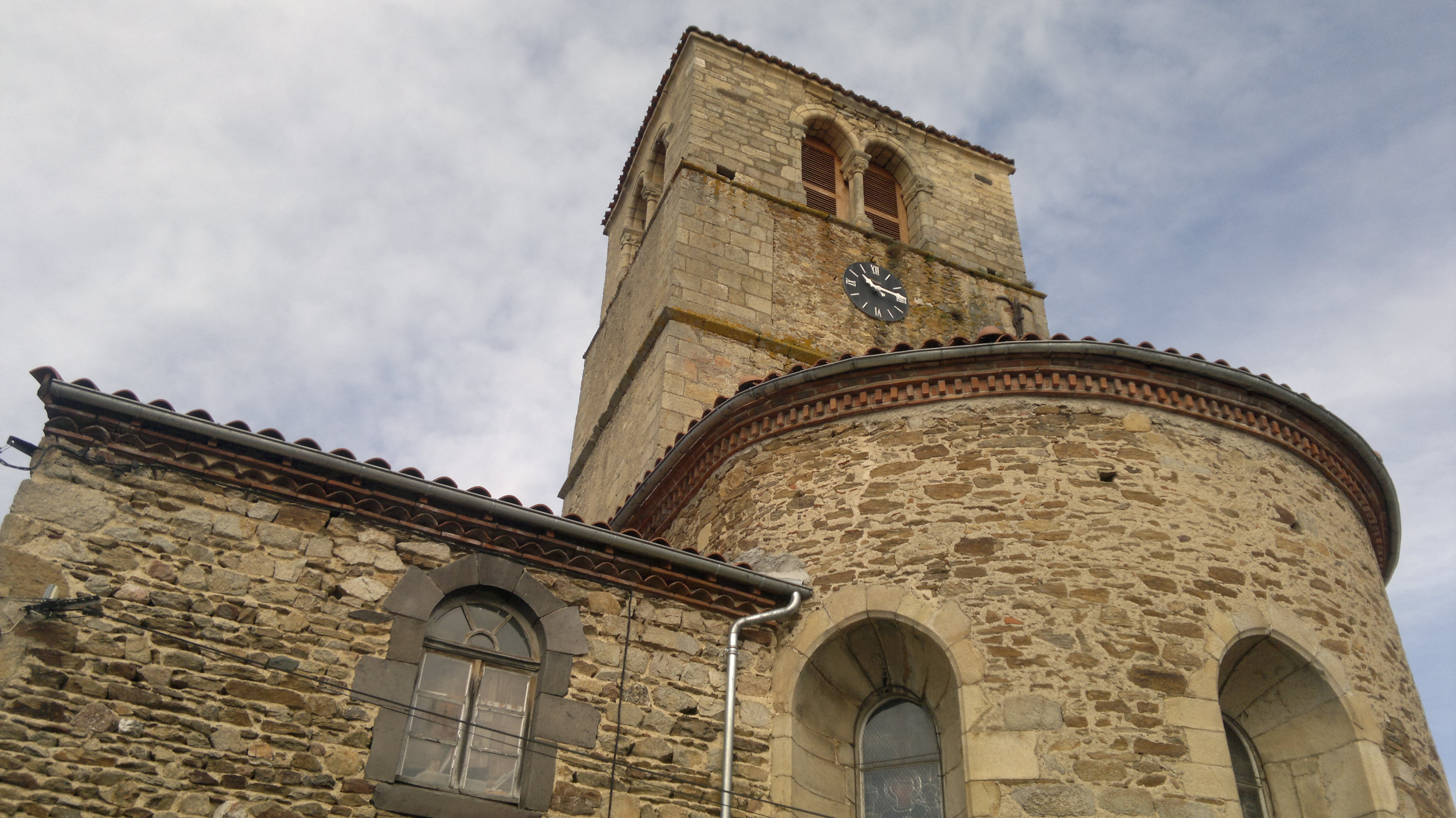
St Peter's church in Champagnac-le-Vieux

== See also ==
- Communes of the Haute-Loire department
