= Blesle =

- Commune
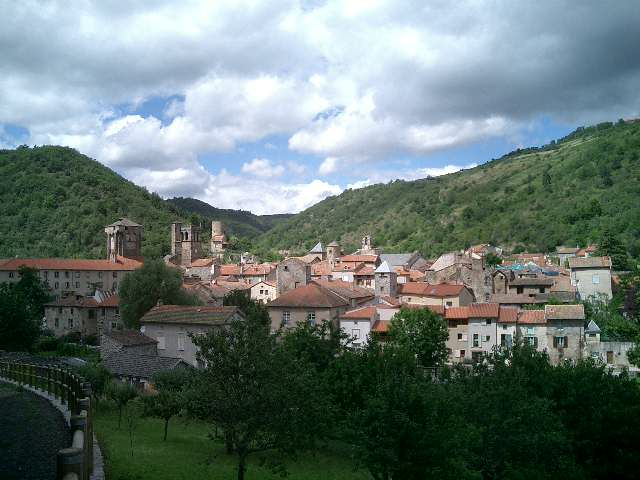

- Coat of arms
- Location of Blesle
- Location within France Location within Auvergne-Rhône-Alpes
- Coordinates: 45°19′11″N 3°10′17″E
- Country: France
- Region: Auvergne-Rhône-Alpes
- Department: Haute-Loire
- Arrondissement: Brioude
- Canton: Sainte-Florine

Government
  - Mayor (2020–2026): Pascal Gibelin
- Area^{1}: 29.8 km^{2} (11.5 sq mi)
- Highest elevation: 875 m (2,871 ft)
- Lowest elevation: 472 m (1,549 ft)
- Population (2023): 611
  - Density: 20.5/km^{2} (53.1/sq mi)
- Time zone: UTC+01:00 (CET)
  - Summer (DST): UTC+02:00 (CEST)
- INSEE/Postal code: 43033 /43450
- ^{1} French Land Register data, which excludes lakes, ponds, glaciers > 1 km^{2} (0.386 sq mi or 247 acres) and river estuaries.

Blesle (French pronunciation: [blɛl]; Occitan: Bleila or Blela) is a commune in the Haute-Loire department, south-central France. It is a member of Les Plus Beaux Villages de France (The Most Beautiful Villages of France) Association.

== Population ==
Historical population
Year	Pop.	±% p.a.
1968	847	—
1975	832	−0.25%
1982	824	−0.14%
1990	703	−1.97%
1999	660	−0.70%
2007	653	−0.13%
2012	621	−1.00%
2017	637	+0.51%
2023	611	−0.69%
Source: INSEE

== See also ==
- Communes of the Haute-Loire department
