= Campigny =

Campigny may refer to places in France:

- Campigny, Calvados
- Campigny, Eure

== See also ==
- Champigny (disambiguation)
