= Varennes-sur-Amance =

- Commune
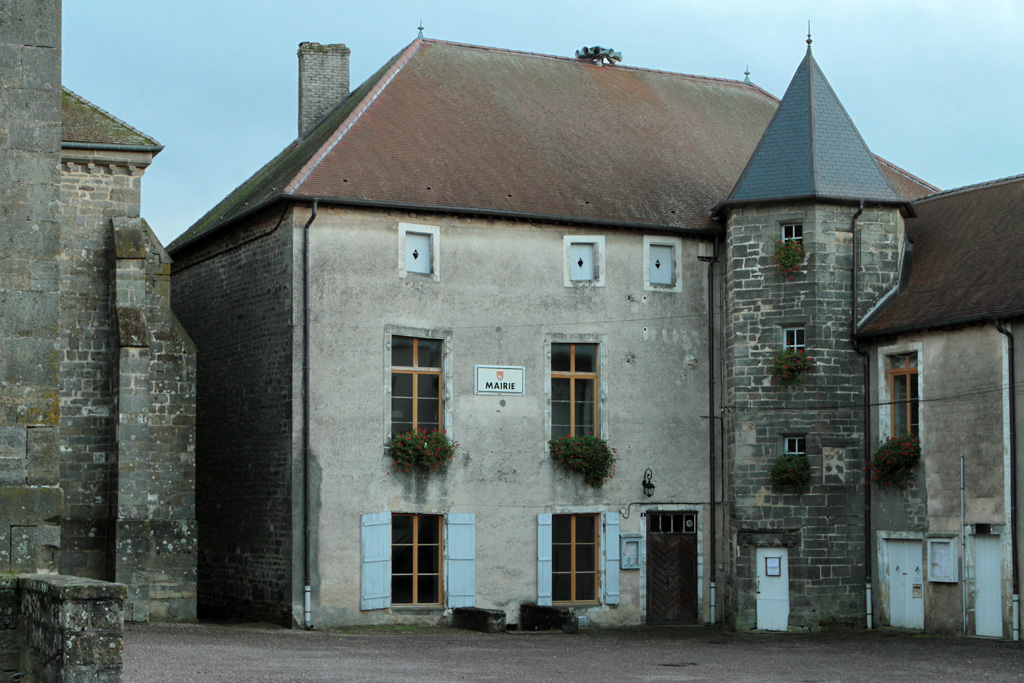
- The town hall in Varennes-sur-Amance

- Coat of arms
- Location of Varennes-sur-Amance
- Location within France Location within Grand Est
- Coordinates: 47°53′52″N 5°37′31″E
- Country: France
- Region: Grand Est
- Department: Haute-Marne
- Arrondissement: Langres
- Canton: Chalindrey

Government
  - Mayor (2020–2026): Malou Denis
- Area^{1}: 12.6 km^{2} (4.9 sq mi)
- Population (2023): 255
  - Density: 20.2/km^{2} (52.4/sq mi)
- Time zone: UTC+01:00 (CET)
  - Summer (DST): UTC+02:00 (CEST)
- INSEE/Postal code: 52504 /52400
- ^{1} French Land Register data, which excludes lakes, ponds, glaciers > 1 km^{2} (0.386 sq mi or 247 acres) and river estuaries.

Varennes-sur-Amance (French pronunciation: [vaʁɛn syʁ amɑ̃s], literally Varennes on Amance) is a commune in the Haute-Marne department in north-eastern France. Between 1972 and 2012 it was part of the commune Terre-Natale. It was the place of birth of novelist and critic Marcel Arland.

== See also ==
- Communes of the Haute-Marne department
