= Multifoil arch =

Architectural element

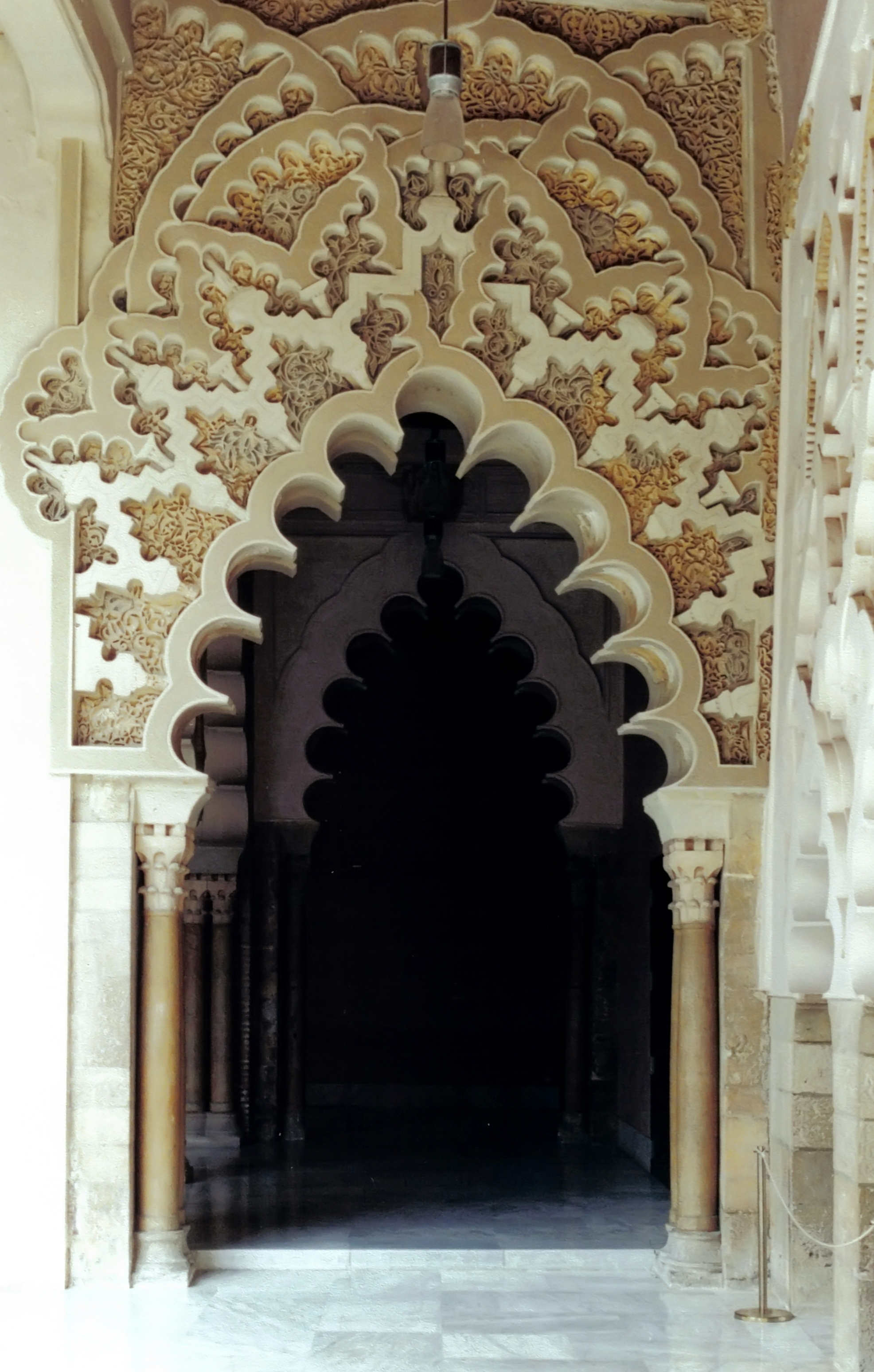
Multifoil arch in the Aljafería, Zaragoza, Spain

A multifoil arch (or polyfoil arch), also known as a cusped arch, polylobed arch, or scalloped arch, is an arch characterized by multiple circular arcs or leaf shapes (called foils, lobes, or cusps) that are cut into its interior profile or intrados. The term foil comes from the old French word for "leaf." A specific number of foils is indicated by a prefix: trefoil (three), quatrefoil (four), cinquefoil (five), sexfoil (six), octofoil (eight). The term multifoil or scalloped is specifically used for arches with more than five foils. The multifoil arch is characteristic of Islamic art and architecture; particularly in the Moorish architecture of al-Andalus (Iberian Peninsula) and North Africa and in Mughal architecture of the Indian subcontinent. Variants of the multifoil arch, such as the trefoil arch, are also common in other architectural traditions such as Gothic architecture.

== Origins ==
The first multifoil arches were developed by the Umayyads and can be found in a small mosque at Qasr al-Hallabat, one of the Umayyad Desert Castles, in present-day Jordan. The architects of this structure experimented with both hollow/concave lobes and protruding/convex lobes in the relieving arches above the doors. Multifoil arches also appear early on as decorative niches in the Qasr al-'Ashiq in Samarra, present-day Iraq, and in the Mosque of Ibn Tulun in Cairo, Egypt, both of which were built under Abbasid (and Tulunid) rule in the 9th century. These examples have been used to support the hypothesis that multifoil arches originated in the Middle Eastern regions of the Islamic world, although Richard Ettinghausen, Oleg Grabar and Marilyn Jenkins-Madina have called this hypothesis into question.

Other early examples of multifoil arches are found in the Great Mosque of Cordoba in al-Andalus (present-day Spain), in particular the arches of the maqsura area added to the mosque in the 10th century by al-Hakam II. Ettinghausen, Grabar, and Jenkins-Madina argue that the form of these arches probably developed locally in al-Andalus, noting that in Cordoba they occurred as structural elements while in the eastern Islamic world they occurred mostly as decorative elements. Another scholar, Ignacio Arce, notes that Ettinghausen and Grabar did not take into account the earlier occurrences at the Qasr al-Hallabat mosque, where polylobed arches are used as structural elements. Jonathan Bloom also argues that the intersecting cusped arches of the Great Mosque of Cordoba were a local development, likely the result of a deliberate elaboration from the older two-tiered round arches that were part of the mosque since its initial foundation in 785.

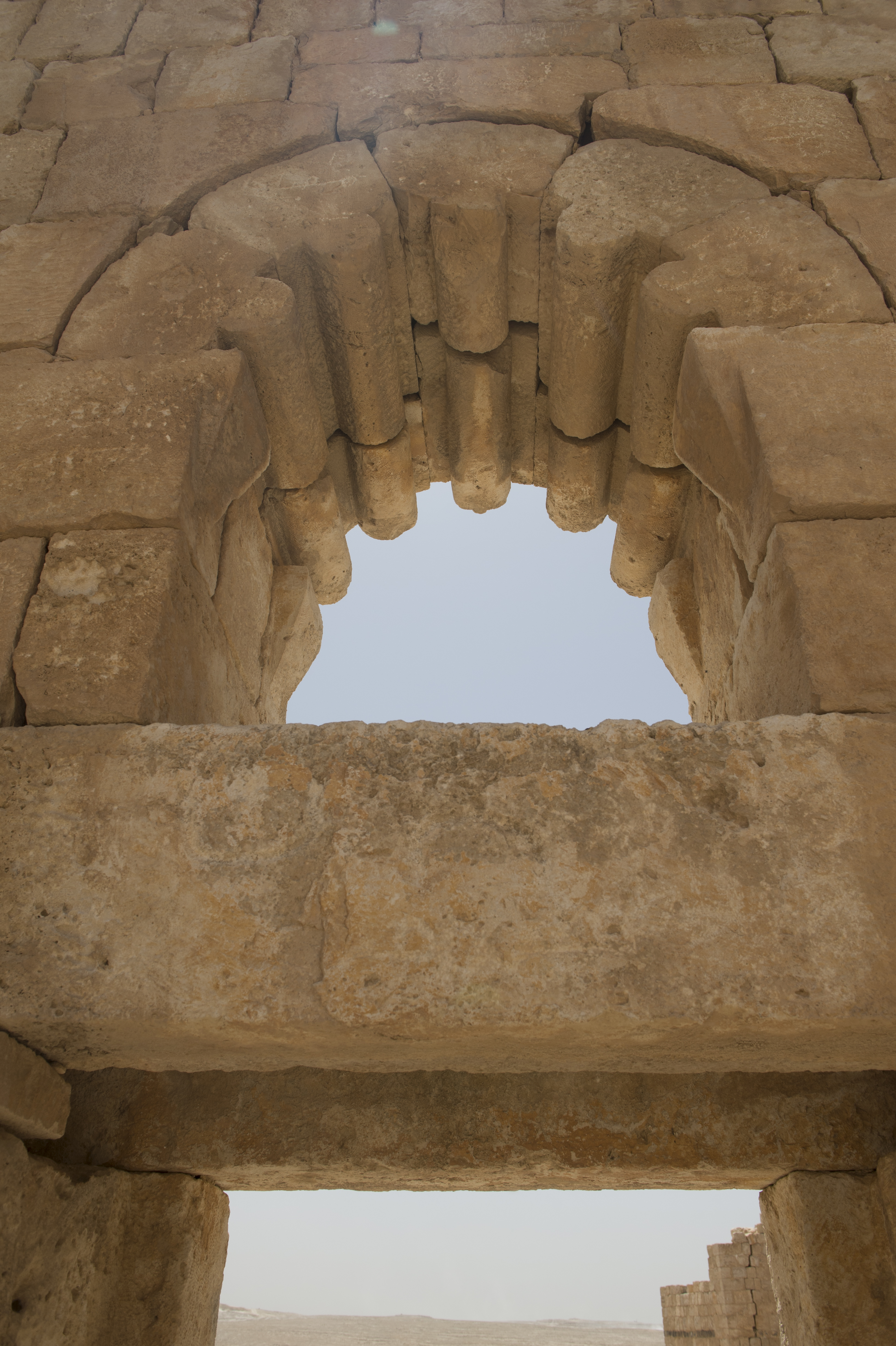
Polylobed arch (with convex or protruding lobes) at Qasr al-Hallabat, Jordan (7th–8th century)

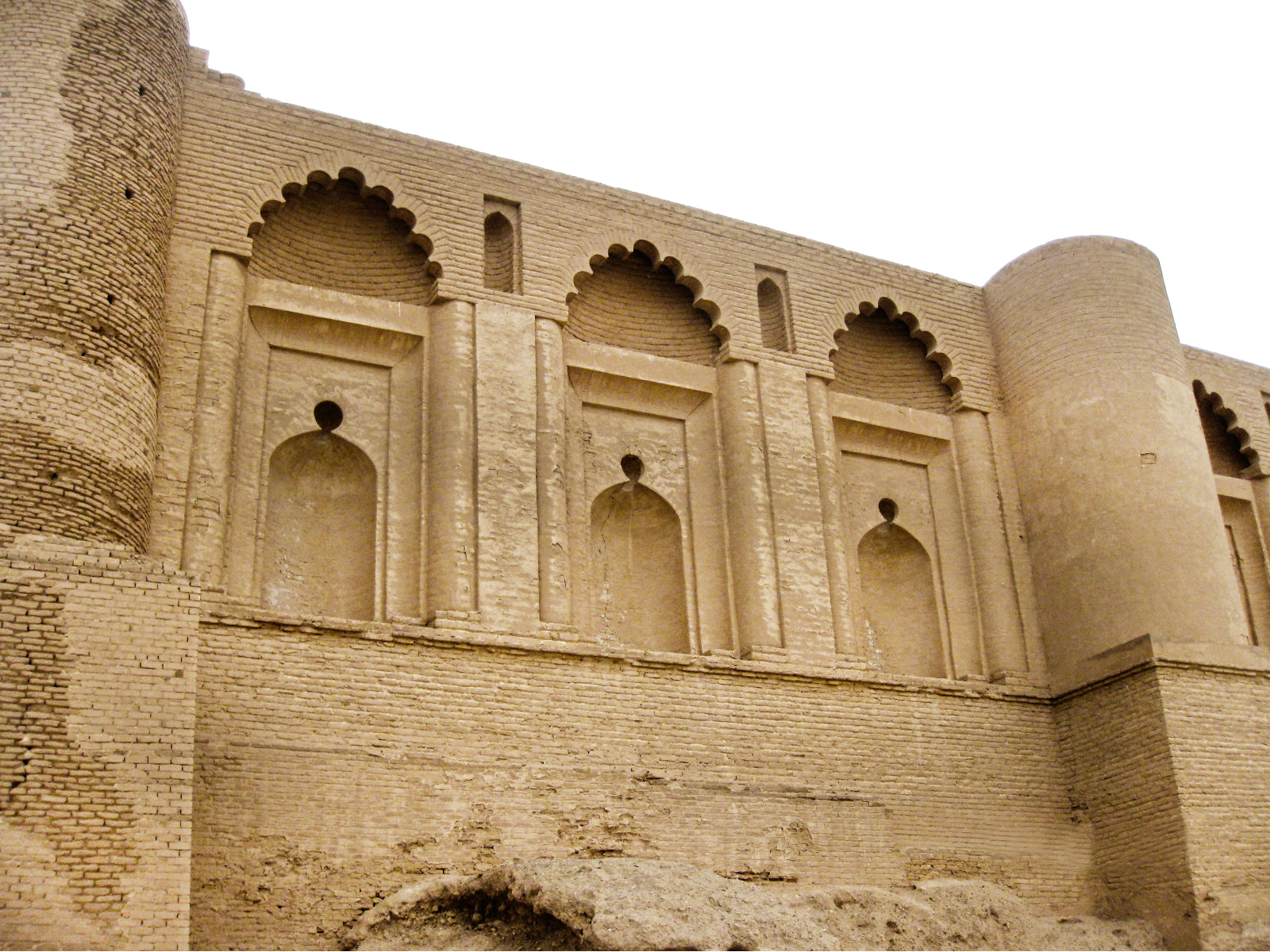
Decorative niches with polylobed arches at Qasr al-'Ashiq in Samarra, Iraq (9th century)

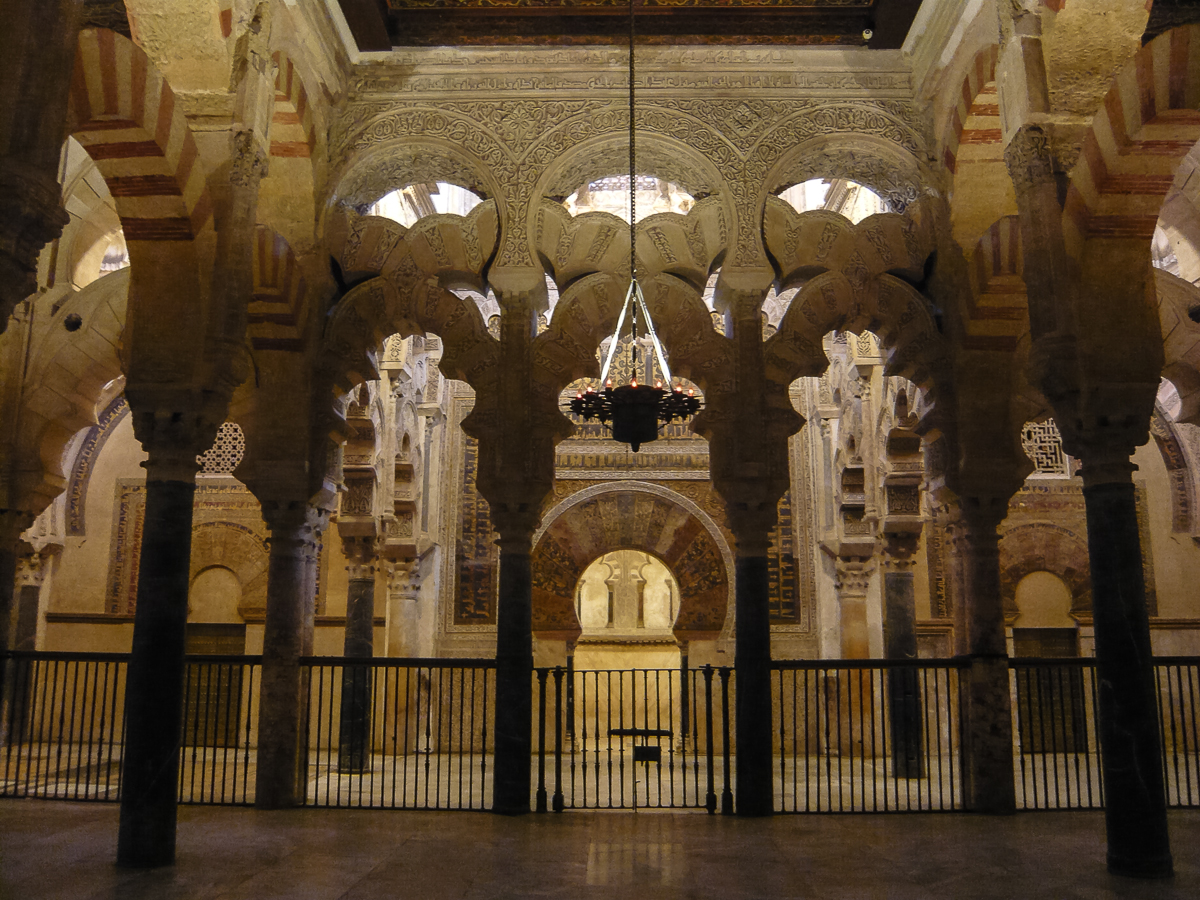
Intersecting multifoil arches in the Great Mosque (present-day cathedral) of Cordoba, Spain (10th century)

== Later developments ==
=== North Africa and al-Andalus ===
The typical multifoil arches that appear in later buildings of Al-Andalus and North Africa also have precedents in Fatimid architecture in Ifriqiya and Egypt, for example at Bab Zuweila (dated to 1091). Georges Marçais argued that both the Great Mosque of Cordoba and Fatimid architecture in Ifriqiya were probably the most relevant precedents which led to the adoption and development of multifoil arches in the western regions of the Islamic world. Multifoil arches appear prominently in the 11th-century Aljaferia palace of the Taifas period in al-Andalus. In the Almoravid and Almohad periods (11th–13th centuries), this type of arch was further refined for decorative functions while horseshoe arches continued to be standard elsewhere. They appear, for example, in the Great Mosque of Tlemcen (in present-day Algeria) and the Mosque of Tinmal (present-day Morocco). The motif of intersecting multifoil arches also gave rise to the sebka motif which is frequently employed in the art and architecture of the region. In Egypt, the cusped trefoil or trilobed arch became a characteristic decorative feature of portals in late Fatimid architecture and Mamluk architecture (from approximately the 12th to 16th centuries).

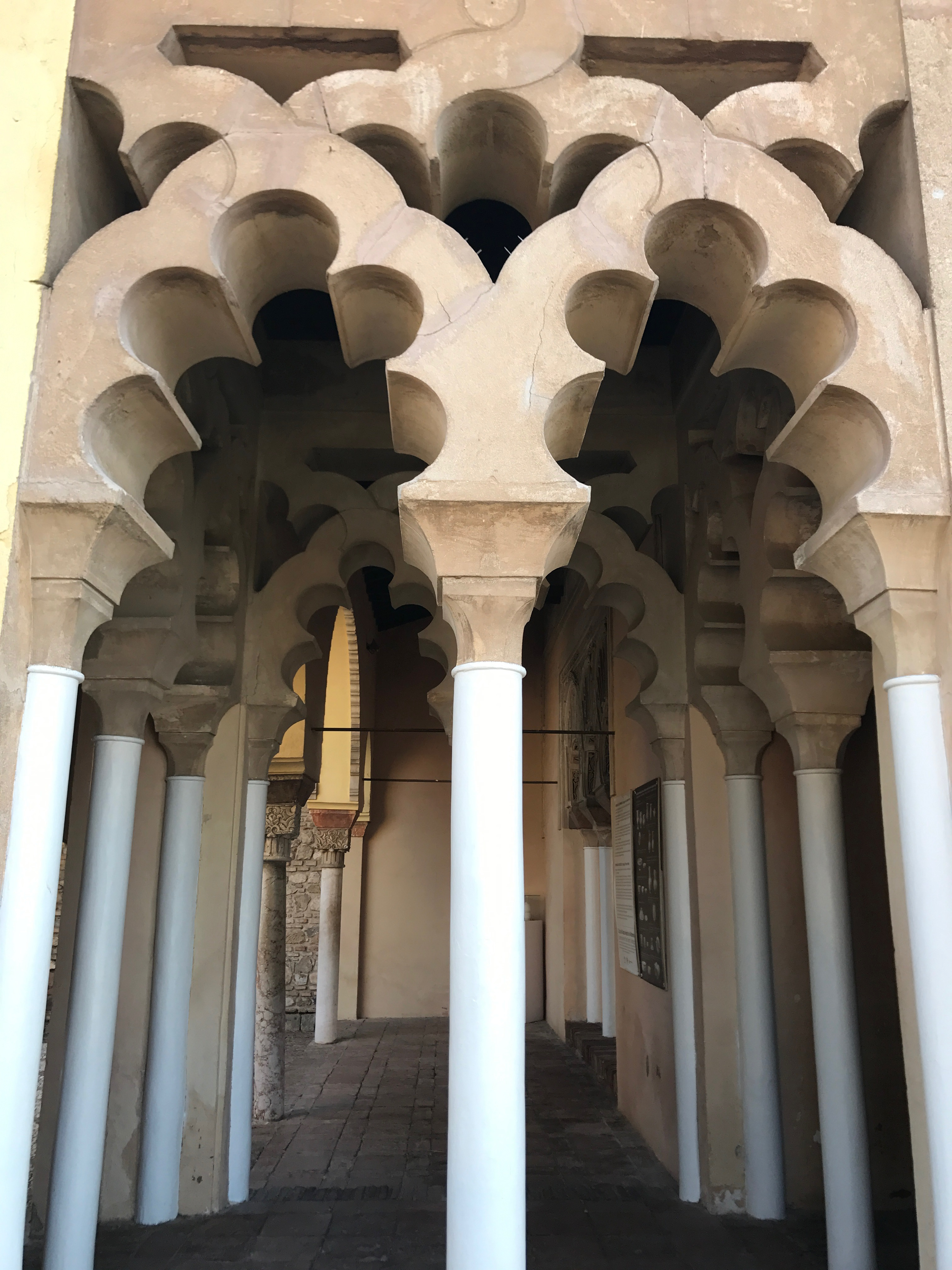
Interlacing multifoil arches at the Alcazaba of Malaga in Spain (11th century)

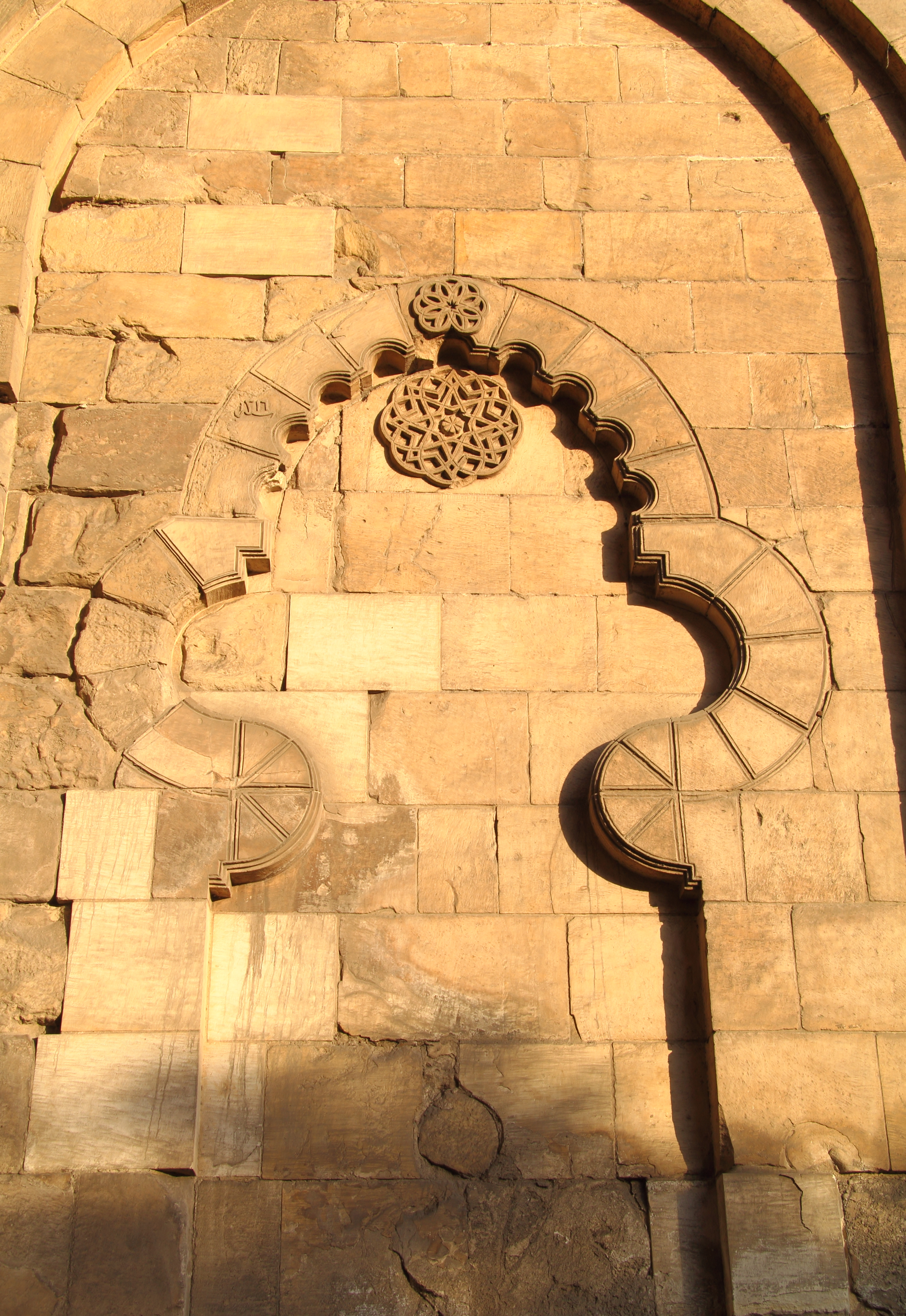
Blind polylobed arch at the Fatimid gate of Bab Zuweila, Cairo, Egypt (1087–1092)

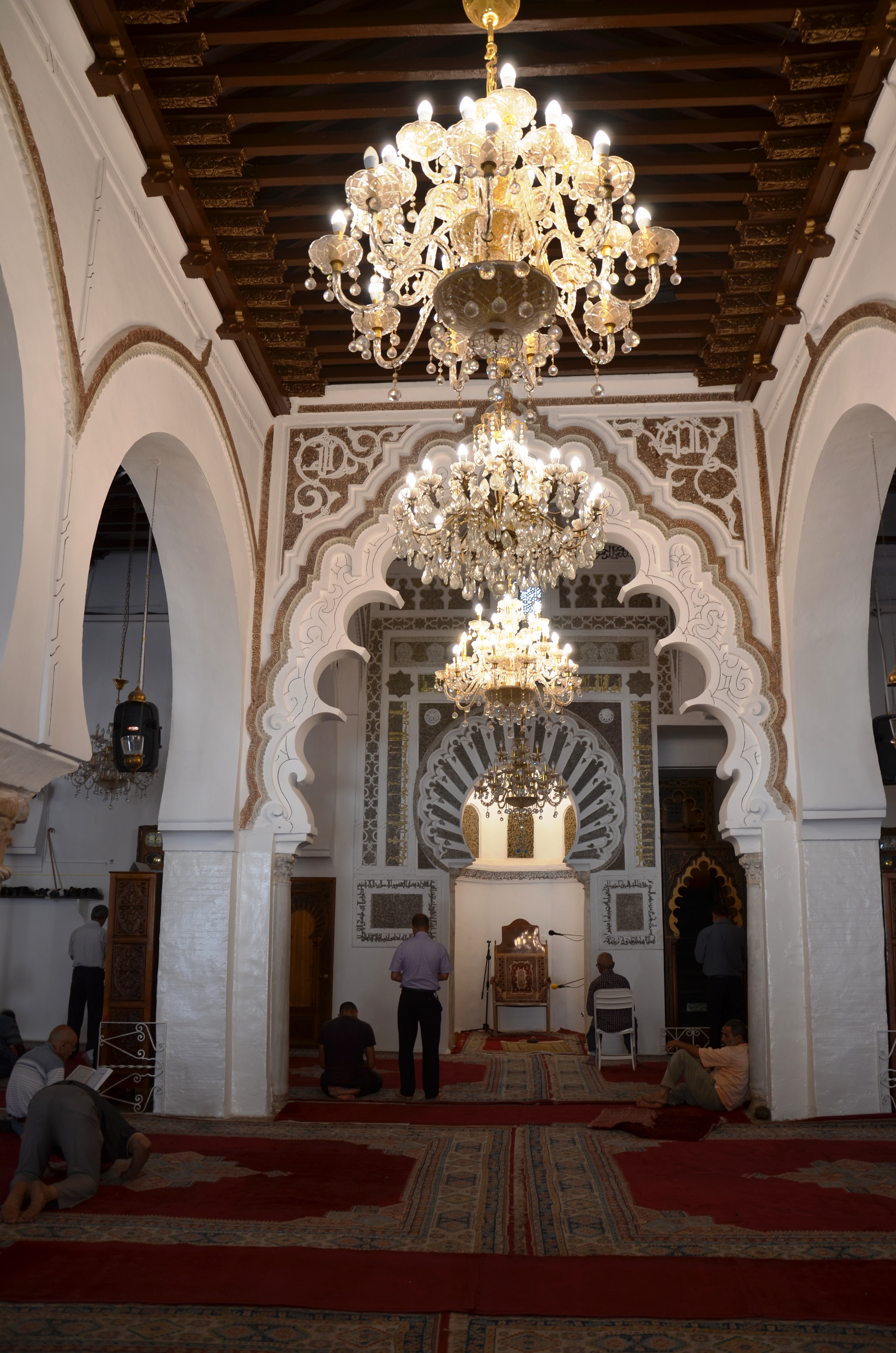
Multifoil arch in front of the mihrab in the Great Mosque of Tlemcen (11th-12th centuries)

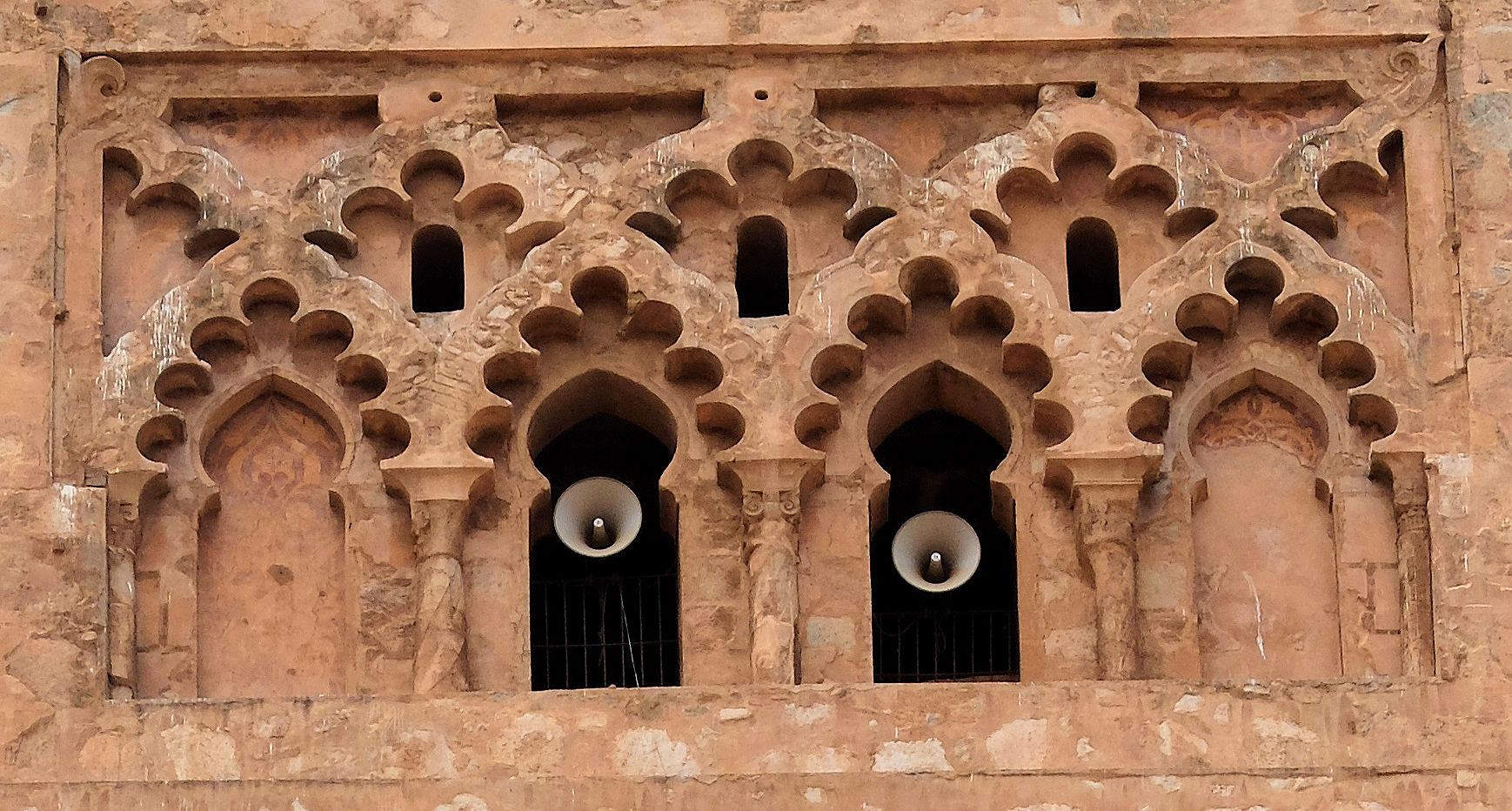
Blind interlacing multifoil arches on the Almohad minaret of the Kutubiyya Mosque in Marrakesh, Morocco (12th century)

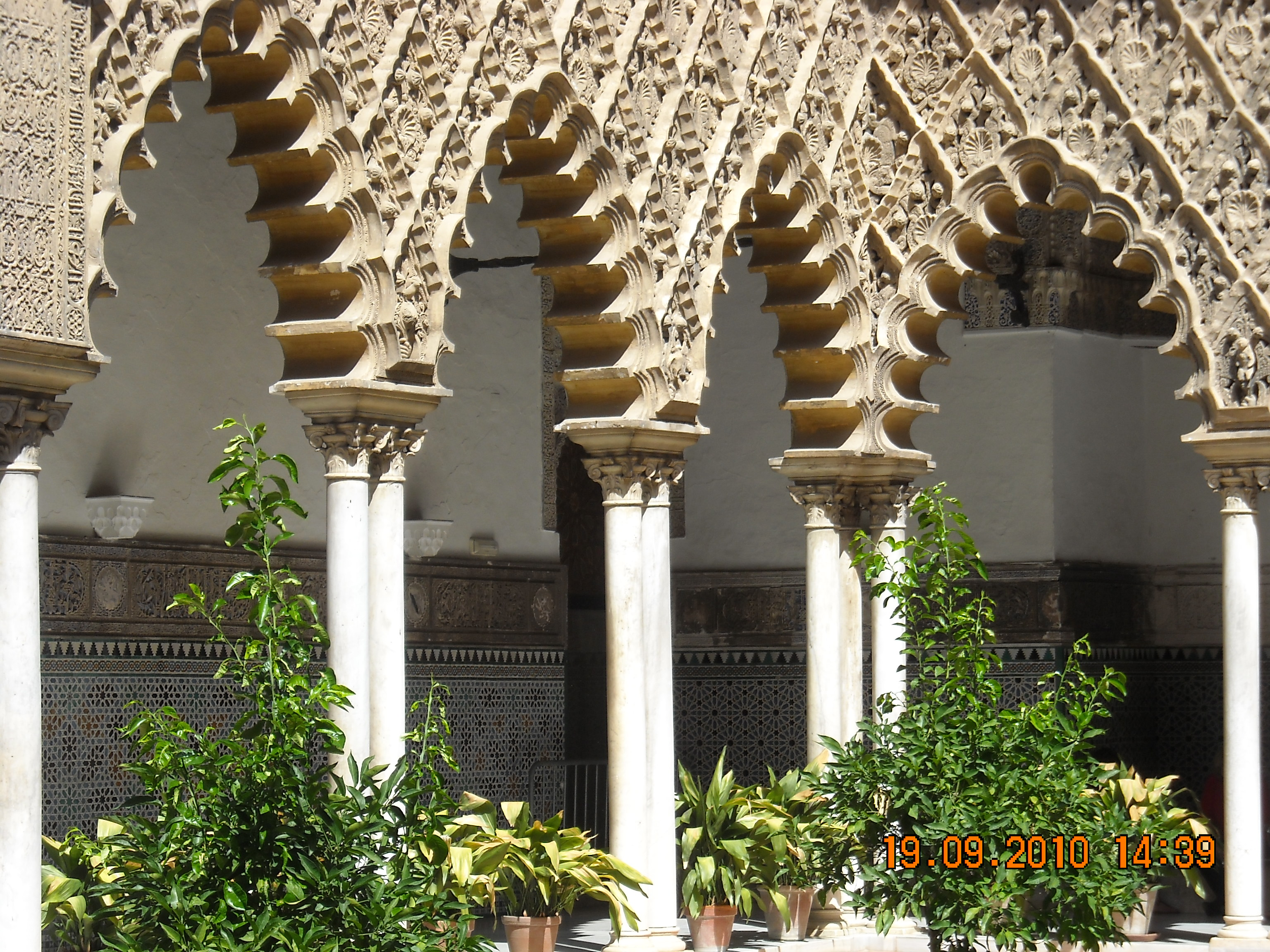
Multifoil arches in the Mudéjar Patio de las Doncellas at the Alcazar of Seville in Spain (14th century)

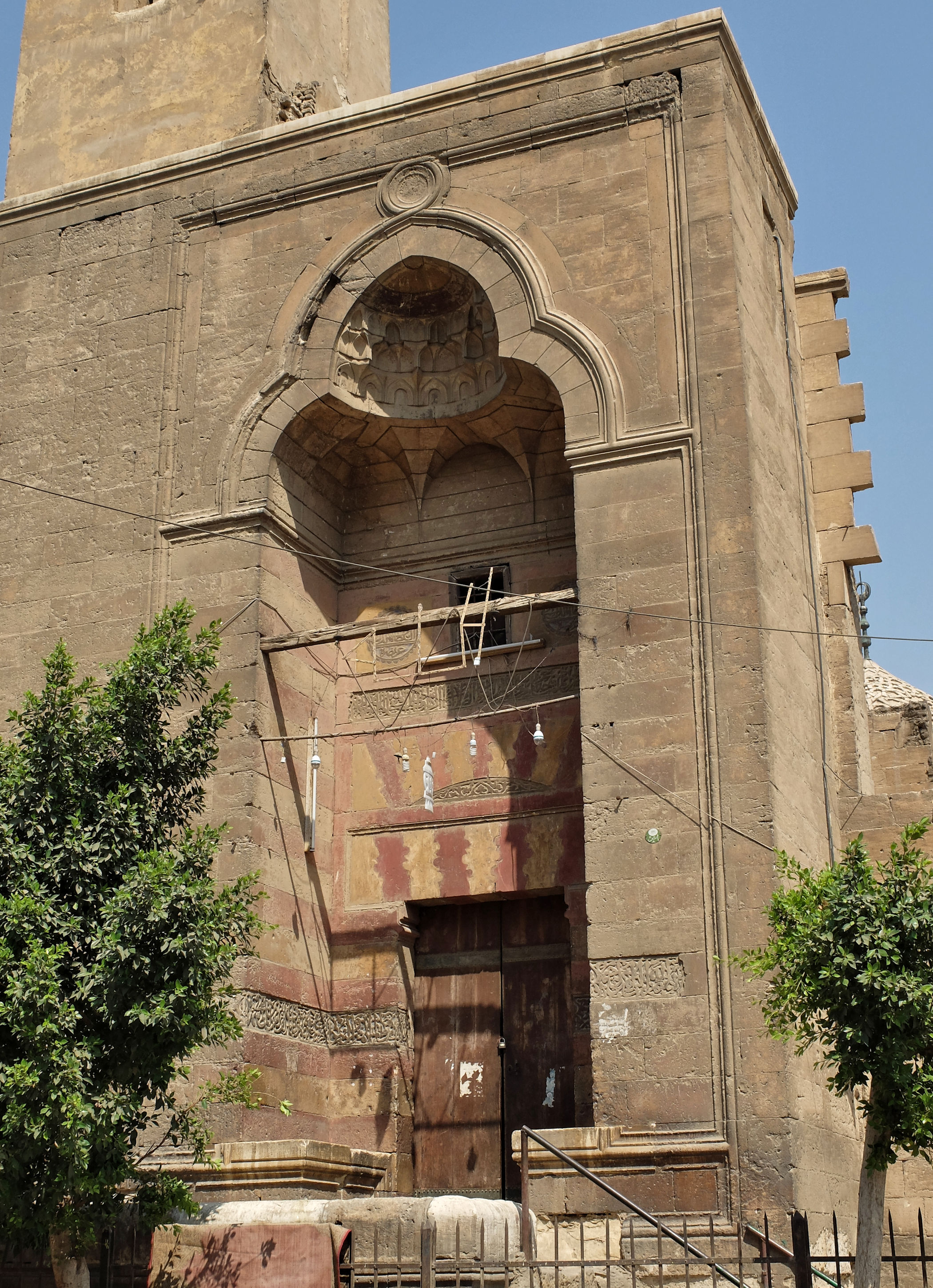
Trilobed (trefoil) arch in the entrance of the Mamluk-era Khanqah-Mausoleum of Sultan Barsbay in Cairo (completed in 1432)

=== Indian subcontinent ===
The cusped arch is attested in Hindu temple architecture such as the trilobed or trefoil arches of the Martand Temple (8th century) and the temple of Pandrethan (10th century), both in Kashmir, as well as at the temple of Malot (10th century) in northern Punjab. The example at the Martand Temple is made with a corbelled stone construction. This use of a trefoil arch, typically inside a triangular pediment on the façade of temples, was a characteristic feature of Hindu architecture in Kashmir and the western Himalayan region during this time. Some of the earliest trefoil-arched entrances in this tradition are attested in temples at Bilot and Mari-Indus, dated by Michael W. Meister to the late 6th or early 7th century and the 8th century, respectively. Over the 9th and 10th centuries this style evolved further and sometimes incorporated five-lobed (or cinquefoil) arches, as exemplified in the Amb temples dated to this period. The most important contribution of Indo-Islamic architecture to this region was the introduction the "true" arch during the Delhi Sultanate period, (Note: The construction technique of a true arch was known in India prior to this but its use was very limited and was attested in isolated examples.) which progressively replaced the trabeate or corbel arch. After this, multifoil arches later became a characteristic feature of Mughal architecture during the 17th century, particularly during the reign of Shah Jahan (r. 1628–1658). It was also characteristic of Rajput architecture, which developed in close relation with Mughal architecture during the Mughal era.

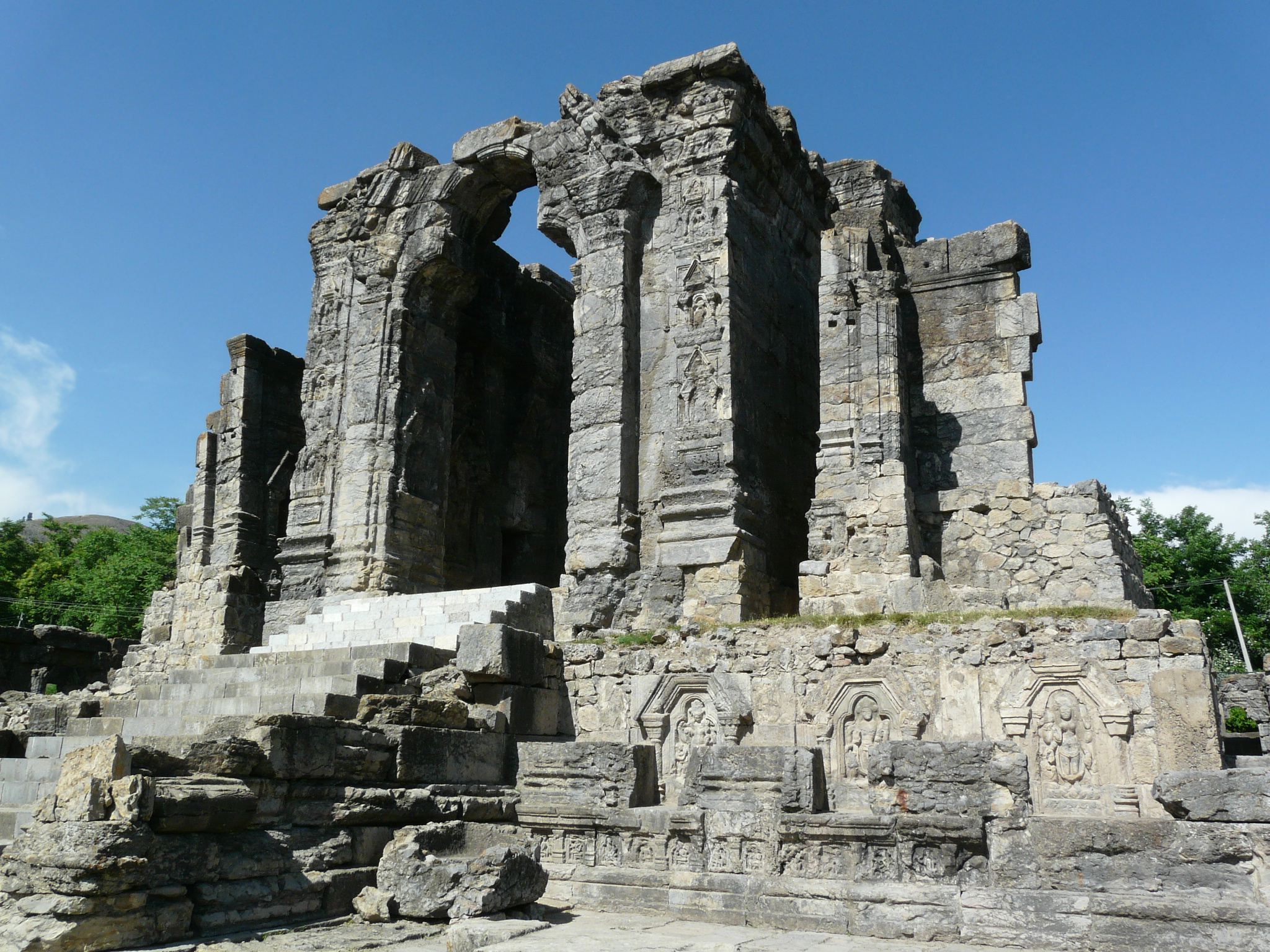
Ruins of Martand Sun Temple, India with a multifoil arched gateway, finished between 625-885 A.D under the Karkota empire.

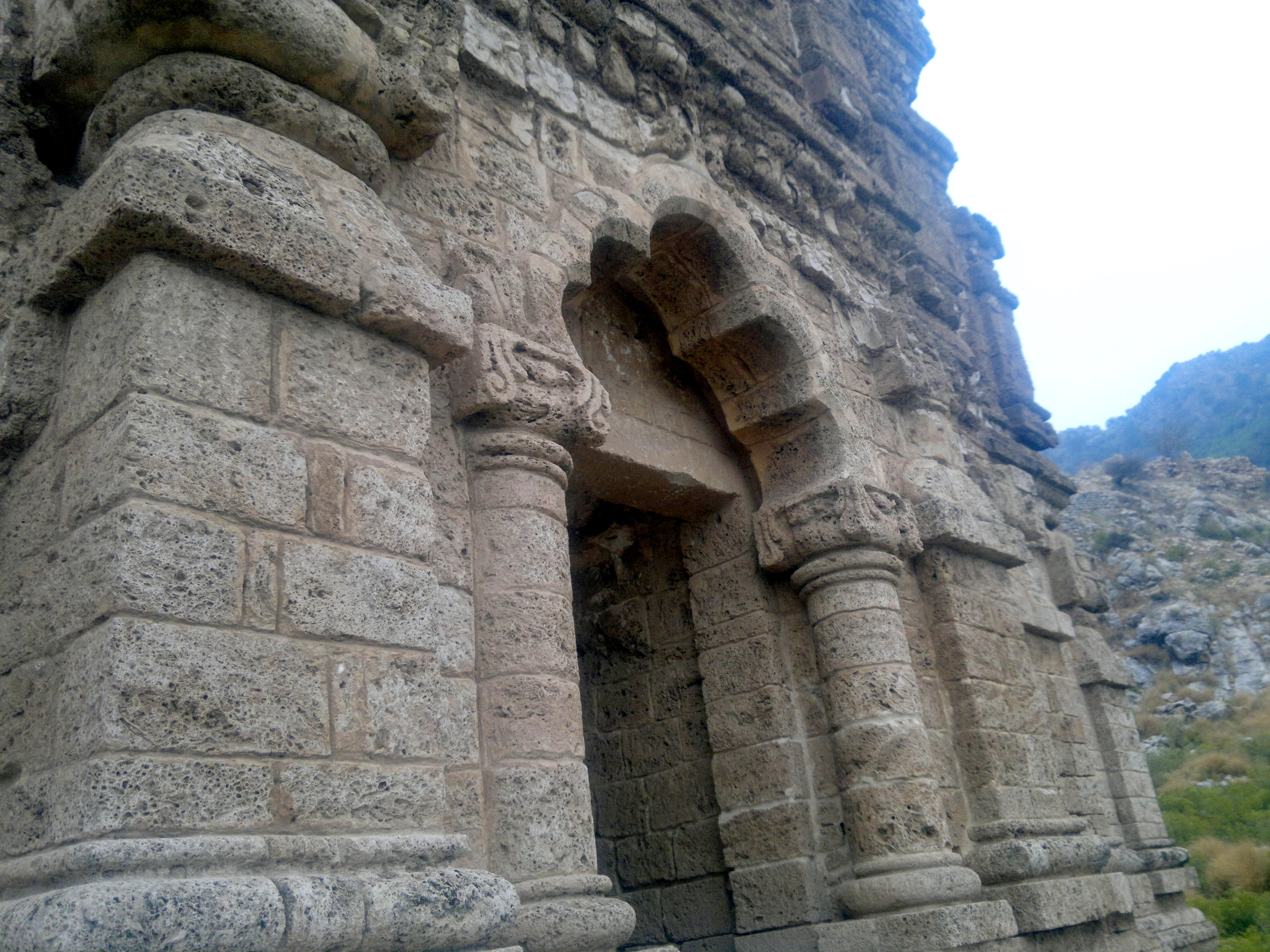
Multifoil arch at Amb temple complex, Pakistan. An example from the Hindu Shahis period, dated between 800-950 AD.

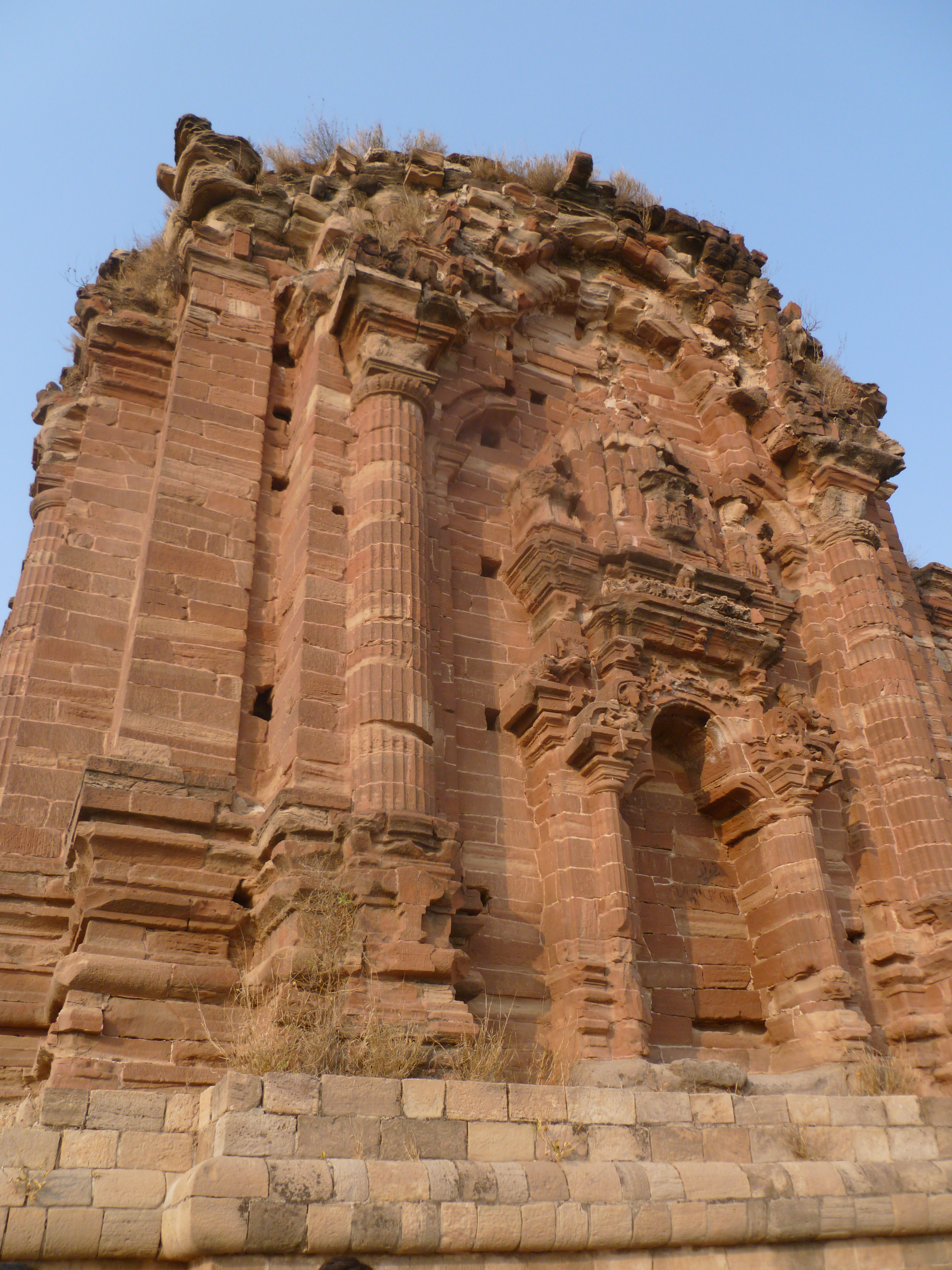
Trefoil arches crowning blind niches on Malot Temple, Pakistan, built around 980 AD.

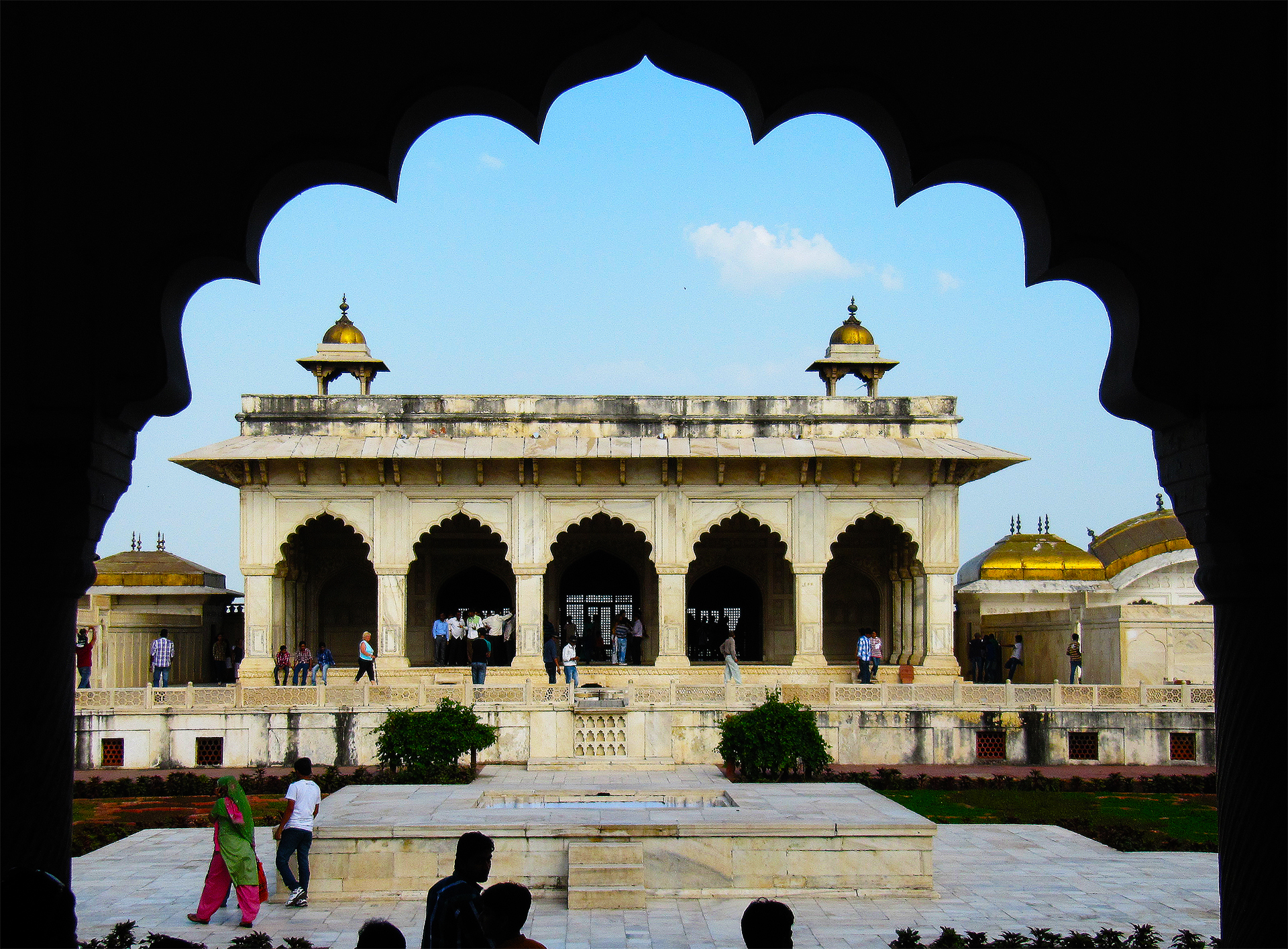
Multifoil arches in Agra Fort, India, begun in 1565. An example of Mughal architecture.

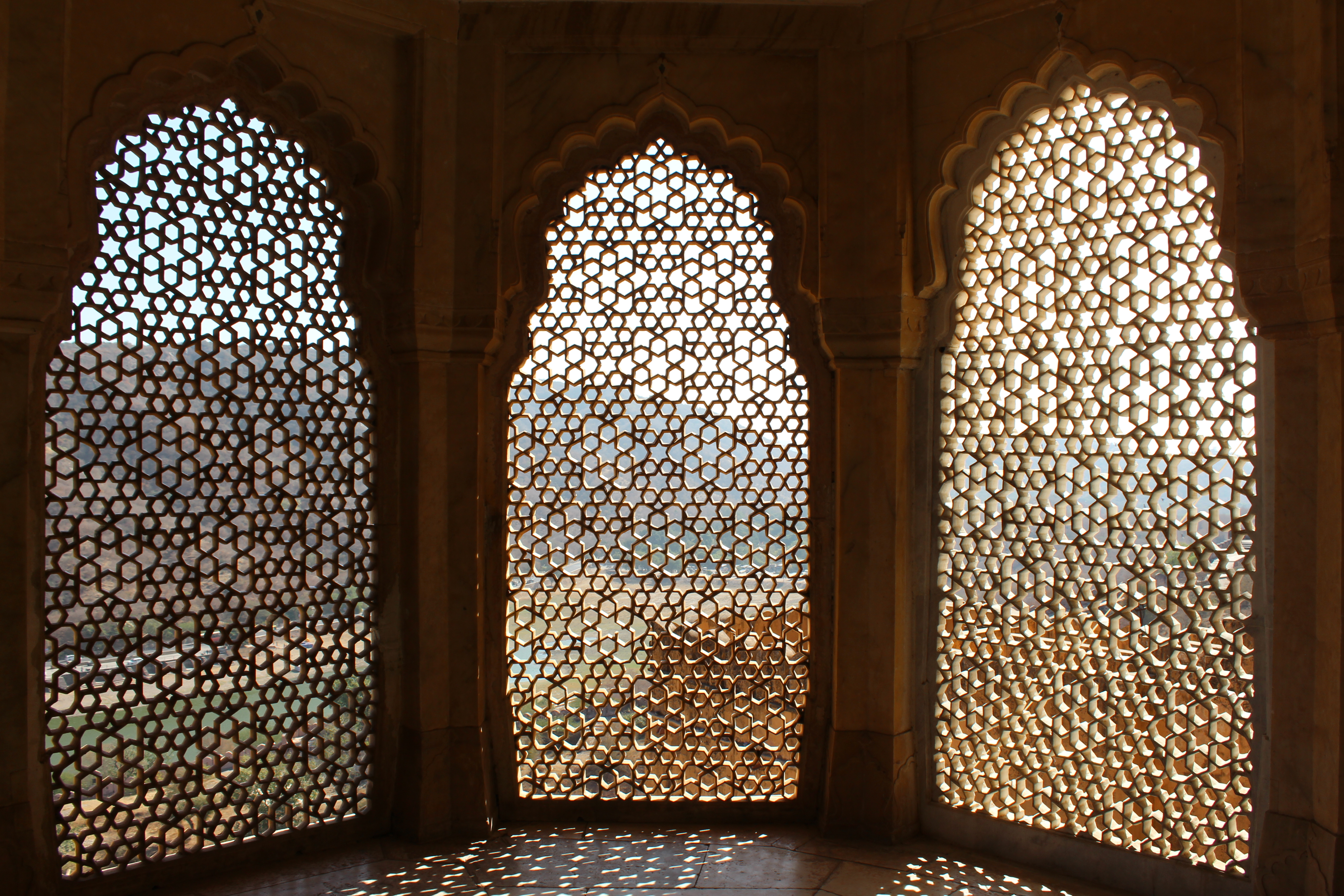
Multifoil arches with jali at Amber fort, India. An example of Rajput architecture, commissioned in 1592.

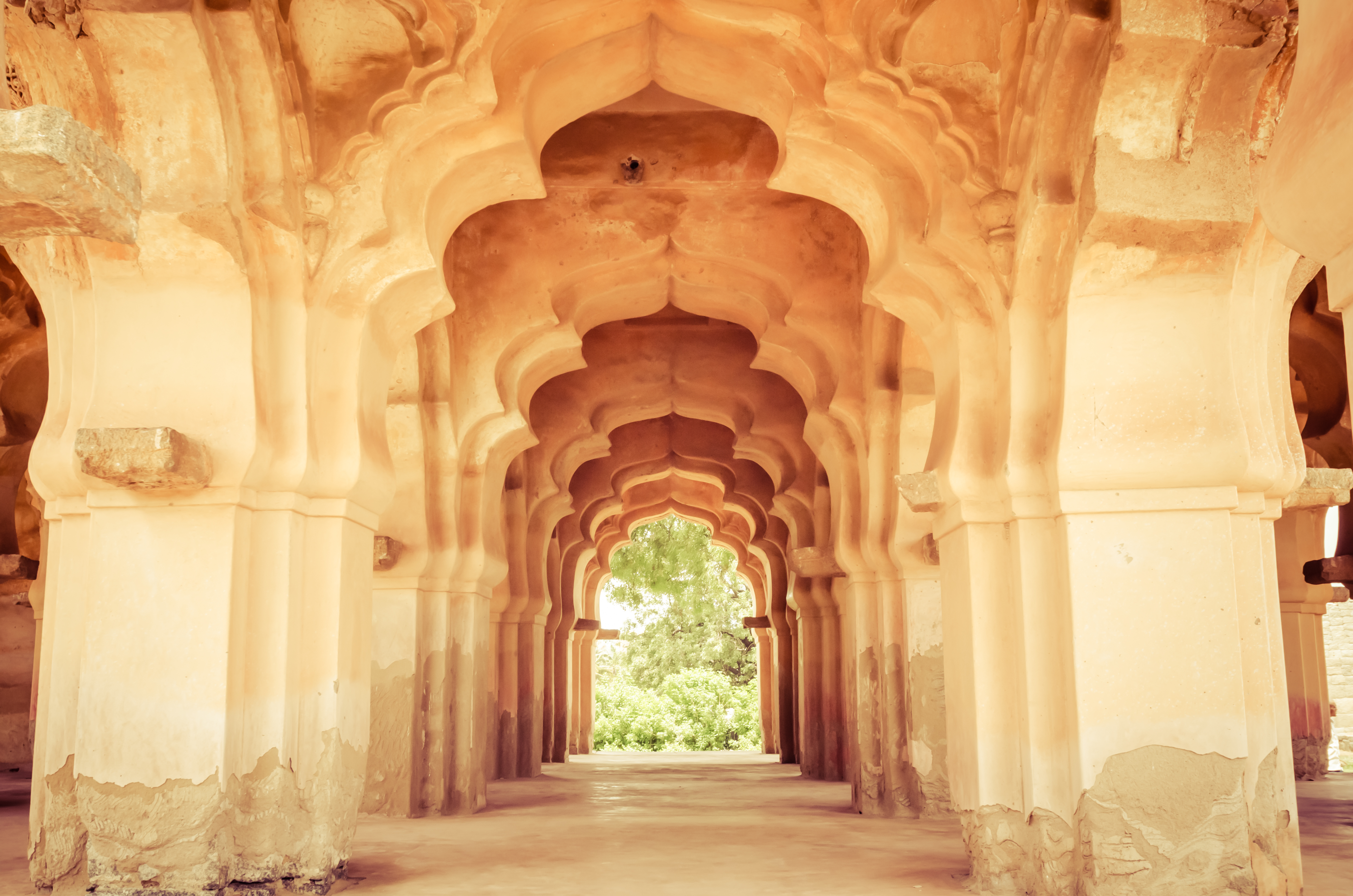
Multifoil arches inside Lotus Mahal, Hampi, India. An example of Vijayanagara architecture from the 16th century.

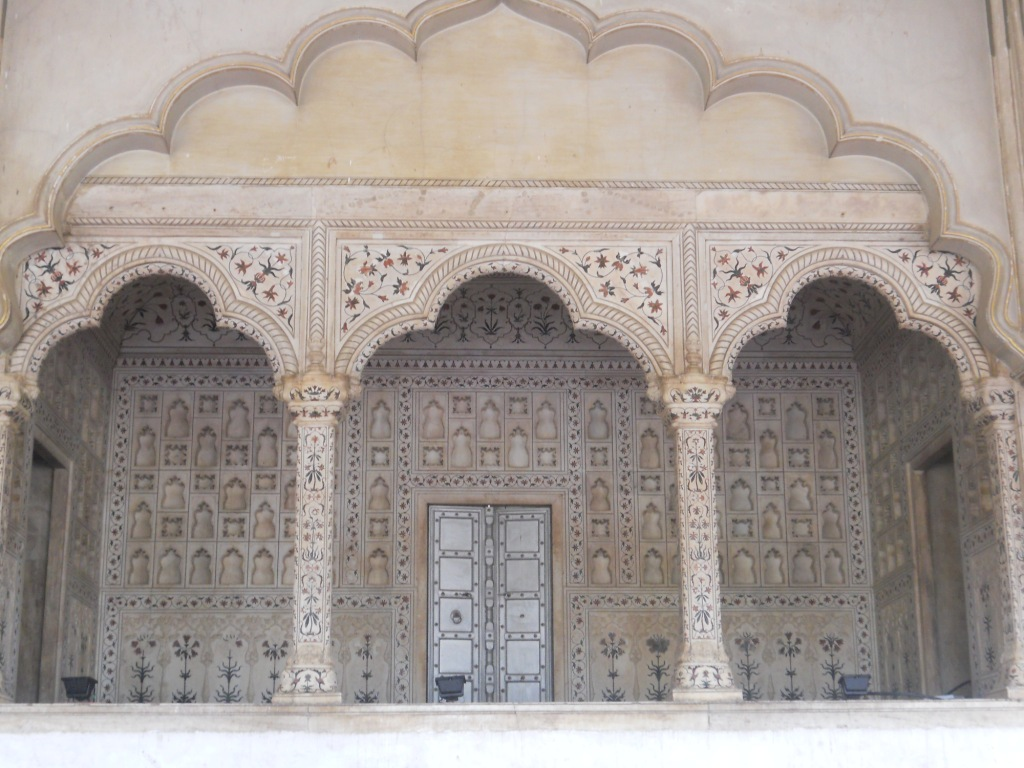
Multifoil arches with parchinkari in Diwan-i-Am, Red Fort, India. An example of Mughal architecture, built between 1631-40.

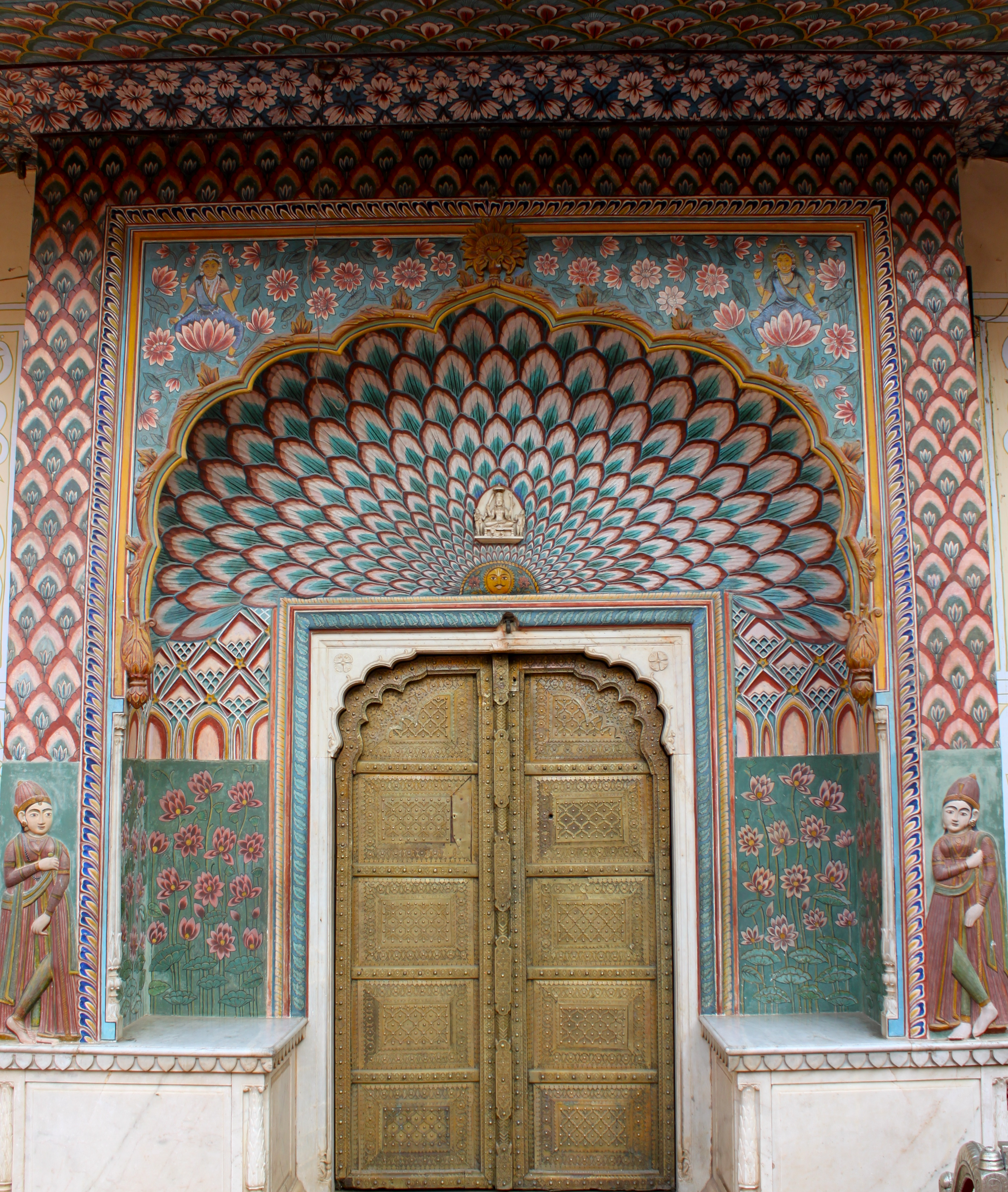
Multifoil arch with mural on lotus gate, City Palace, Jaipur, India. An example of Rajput architecture, built between 1727-32.

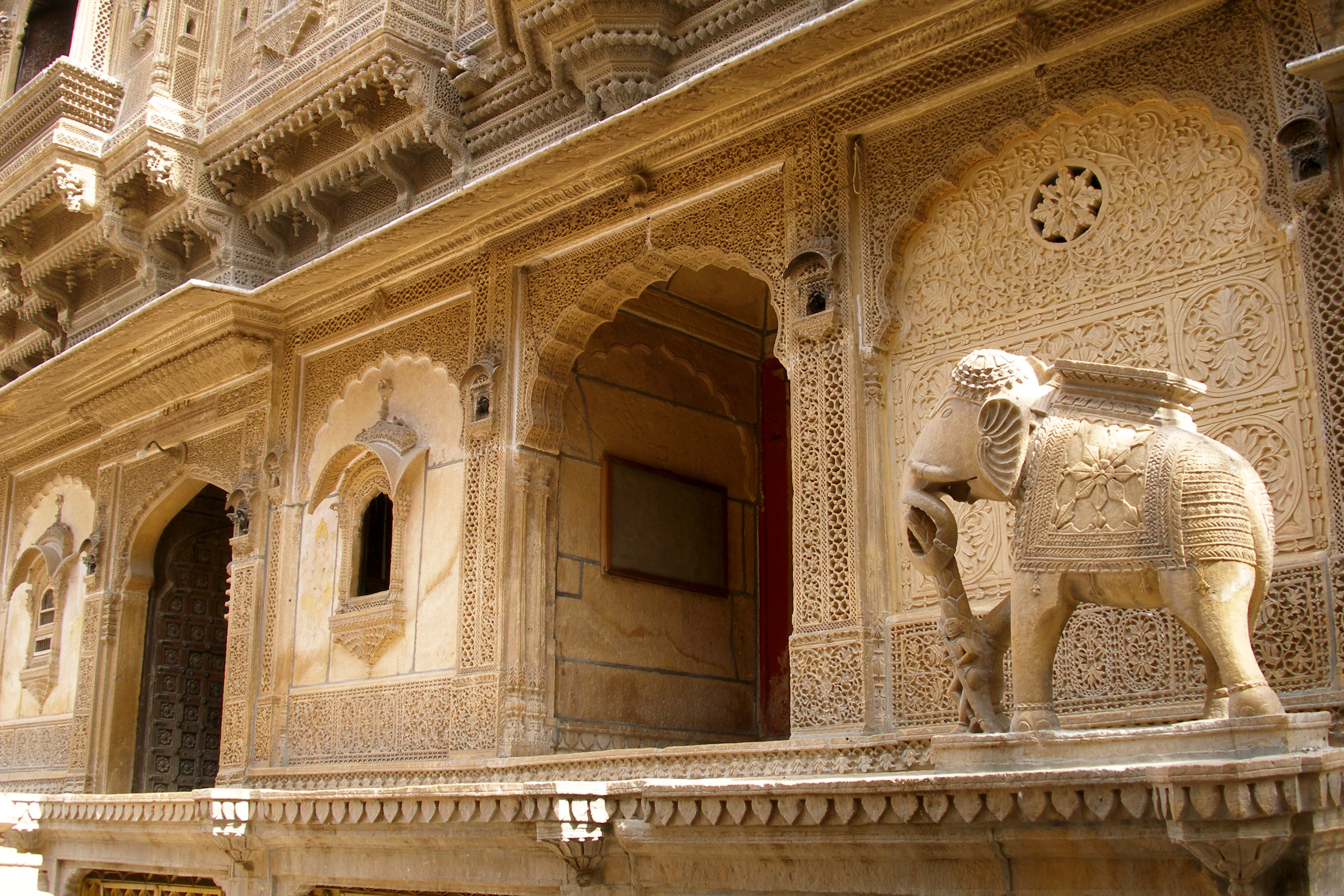
Multifoil arches with intricate arabesque on Nathmal Ki Haveli in Jaisalmer, India. An example of Rajput architecture, built in the 19th century.

=== Christian Europe ===
In the architecture of Christian Europe, multifoil arches appear occasionally in Romanesque architecture, with some early examples in France such as the chapel of Saint-Michel-d’Aiguilhe in Le Puy-en-Velay, France (10th–11th century) and the Abbey of Cluny (circa 1100). In the Christian territories of the Iberian Peninsula (present-day Spain), the earliest examples are from the early 12th century and found in the Collegiate Church of San Isidoro in Léon and the Cathedral of Santiago de Compostela. These early Iberian examples were highly similar to the multifoil arches of contemporary Islamic/Moorish architecture in al-Andalus and were probably directly appropriated from the latter. Scholars Francine Giese and Sarah Keller argue that this initial appropriation from Muslim architecture was likely intended to express a sense of triumph and superiority over Islamic al-Andalus at the time, but that over the course of the 12th century the motif became acculturated to Romanesque art and then developed independently from al-Andalus in both Christian Iberia and France. As a result, multifoil arches became more common and developed multiple variations in the Romanesque architecture of these regions during the later 12th century. In Toledo, after its conquest by Castile in 1085, the new churches and synagogues which were built in the 12th century and after were designed in a Mudéjar style that frequently incorporated polylobed arches as part of its visual repertoire. The Cathedral of Toledo, whose construction began in the 13th century, was built primarily in a Gothic style but also incorporates polylobed arches (most notably in the triforium of the ambulatory), suggesting that this motif had by then become thoroughly assimilated to local Christian architecture. Multifoil arches, particularly trefoil arches, became common in Gothic architecture for portals and decoration throughout Europe. Cusped forms (not necessarily as arches) were also common to form the motifs used in Gothic tracery.

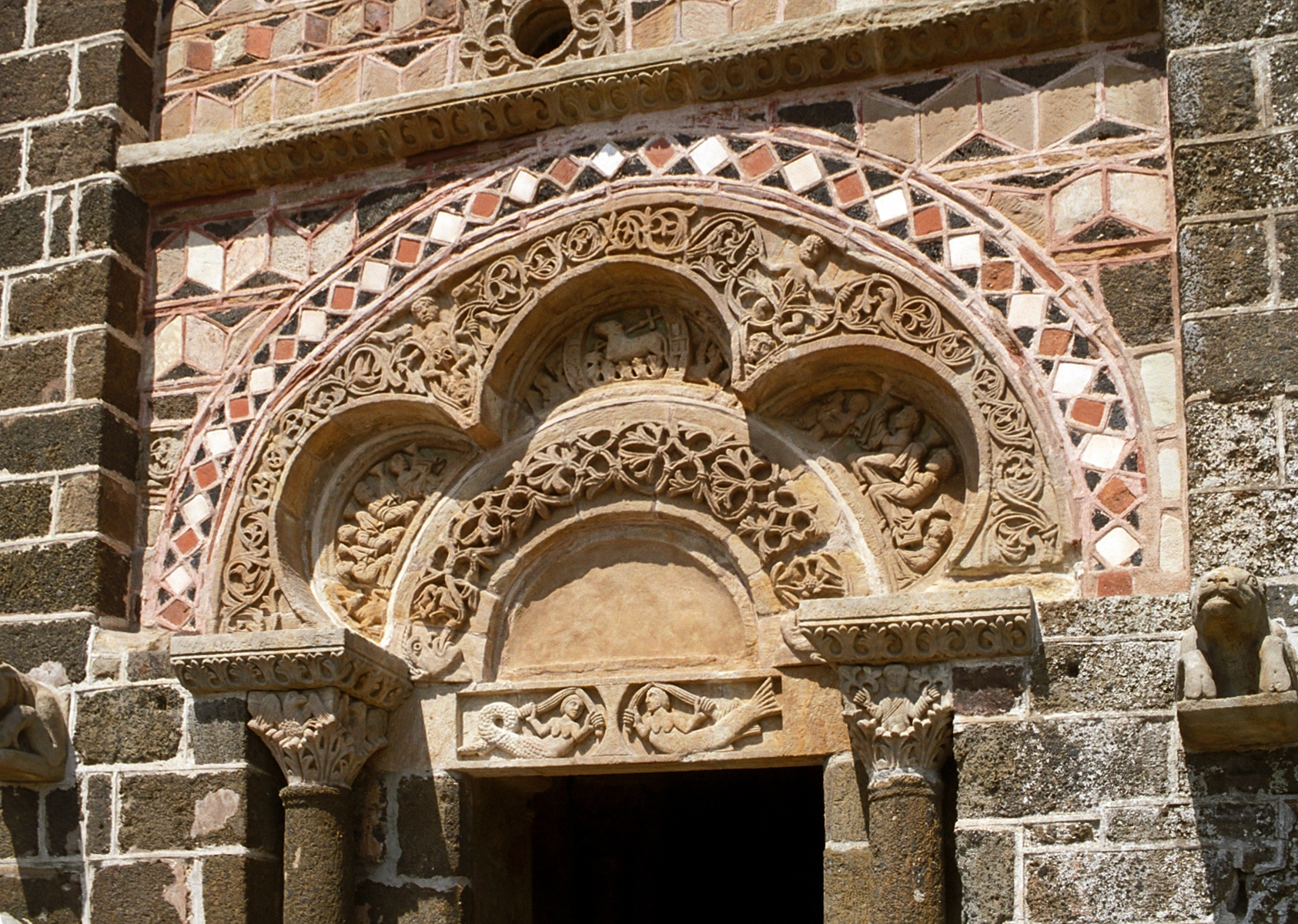
Blind polylobed arch above the door of the Romanesque chapel of Saint-Michel-d’Aiguilhe in Le Puy-en-Velay, France (10th–11th century)

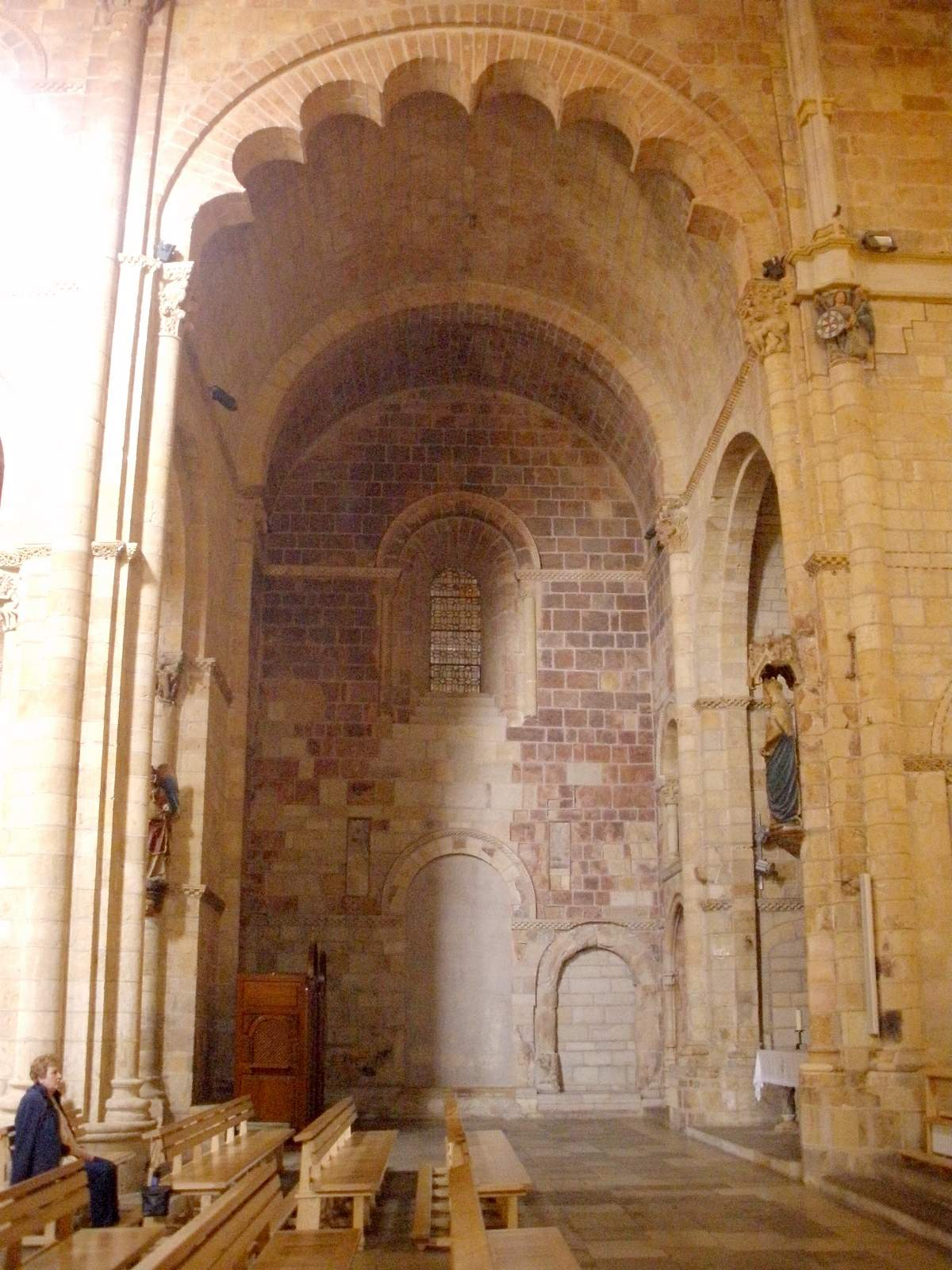
Multifoil arch in the Church of San Isidoro in Léon, Spain (early 13th century)

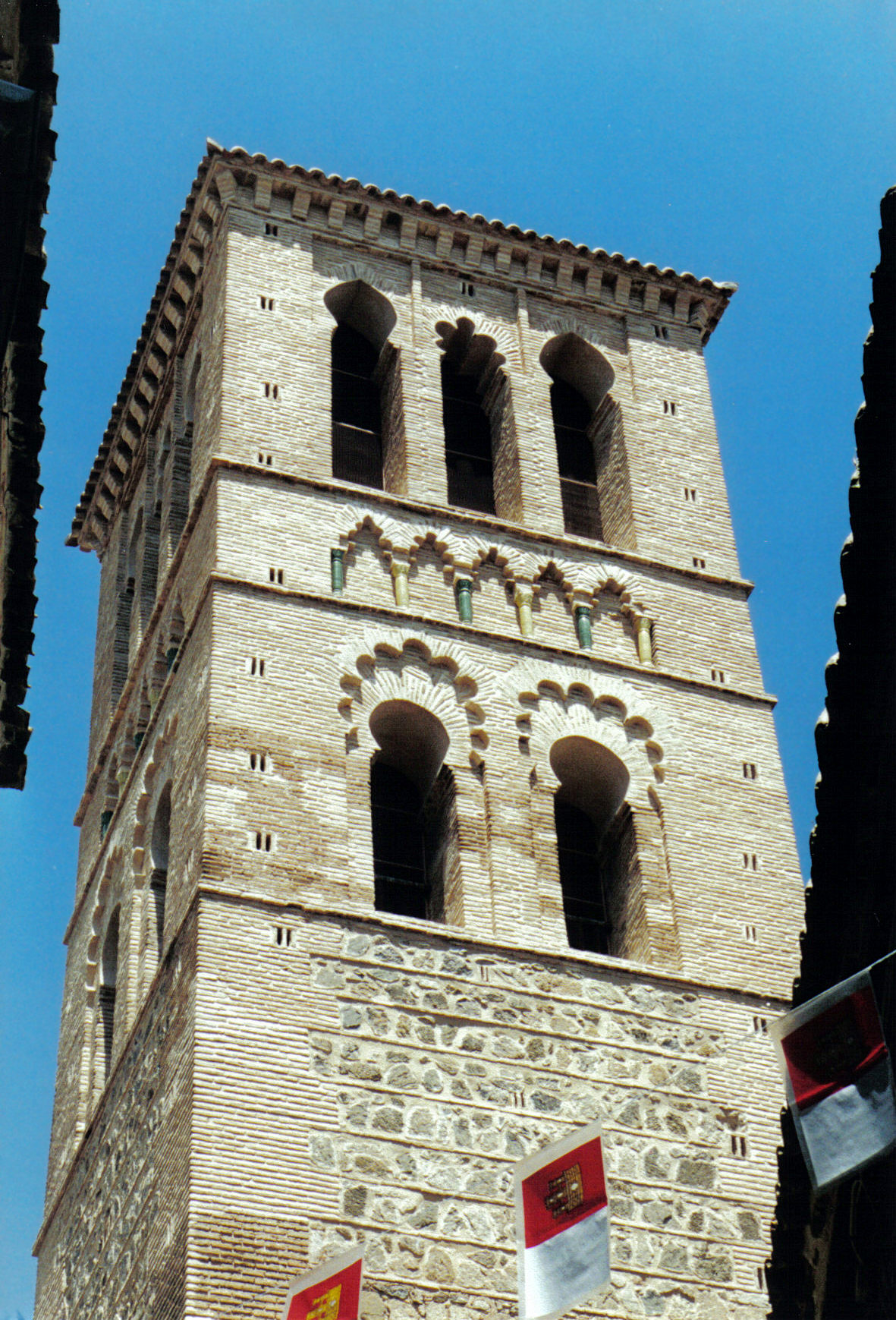
Multifoil arch decoration on the Mudéjar bell tower of the Church of Santo Tomé in Toledo, Spain (14th century)

Decorated multifoil/trefoil portal in the Capelas Imperfeitas of the Batalha Monastery, Portugal (circa 1435)

== See also ==
- Lambrequin arch
- Spanish architecture
