= Polignac, Haute-Loire =

Polignac
- Commune
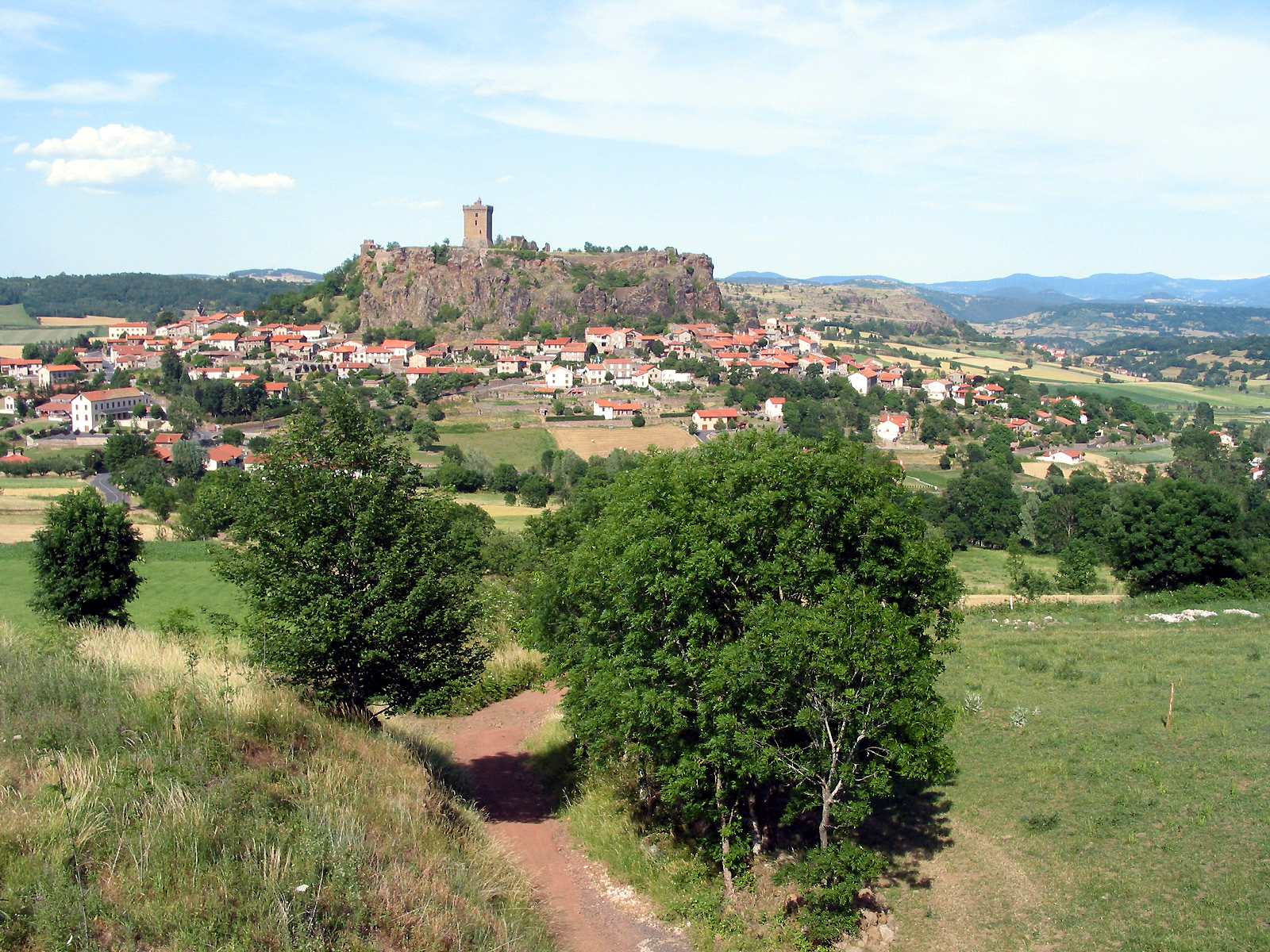

- Flag Coat of arms
- Location of Polignac
- Location within France Location within Auvergne-Rhône-Alpes
- Coordinates: 45°04′14″N 3°51′37″E
- Country: France
- Region: Auvergne-Rhône-Alpes
- Department: Haute-Loire
- Arrondissement: Le Puy-en-Velay
- Canton: Le Puy-en-Velay-2
- Intercommunality: CA du Puy-en-Velay

Government
  - Mayor (2020–2026): Jean-Paul Vigouroux
- Area^{1}: 33.05 km^{2} (12.76 sq mi)
- Elevation: 740 m (2,430 ft)
- Highest elevation: 892 m (2,927 ft)
- Lowest elevation: 562 m (1,844 ft)
- Population (2023): 2,819
  - Density: 85.30/km^{2} (220.9/sq mi)
- Time zone: UTC+01:00 (CET)
  - Summer (DST): UTC+02:00 (CEST)
- INSEE/Postal code: 43152 /43000
- ^{1} French Land Register data, which excludes lakes, ponds, glaciers > 1 km^{2} (0.386 sq mi or 247 acres) and river estuaries.

Polignac (French pronunciation: [pɔliɲak]; Occitan: Panhac) is a commune in the Haute-Loire department in south-central France. It is a member of Les Plus Beaux Villages de France (The Most Beautiful Villages of France) Association.

== Population ==
Historical population

Year	Pop.	±% p.a.
1793	1,954	—
1821	2,131	+0.31%
1846	2,094	−0.07%
1872	2,274	+0.32%
1901	2,574	+0.43%
1926	2,092	−0.83%
1946	1,569	−1.43%
1962	1,257	−1.38%
1968	1,407	+1.90%

Year	Pop.	±% p.a.
1975	1,709	+2.82%
1982	2,003	+2.29%
1990	2,384	+2.20%
1999	2,602	+0.98%
2007	2,785	+0.85%
2012	2,817	+0.23%
2017	2,814	−0.02%
2023	2,819	+0.03%

Source: EHESS and INSEE (1968-2023)

== Sights ==
The town is dominated by the Forteresse de Polignac with its square donjon tower, 32 m tall. The Chateau de Lavoute Polignac is a few miles away, close to the village of Lavoute.

== Art and literature ==
The poetical illustration "The Church at Polignac" by Letitia Elizabeth Landon to a painting by James Duffield Harding was written during the imprisonment of Prince Polignac and his colleagues, after the French Revolution of 1830 (in Fisher's Drawing Room Scrap Book, 1837).

== See also ==
- Communes of the Haute-Loire department
