= Le Monteil, Haute-Loire =

Le Monteil
- Commune
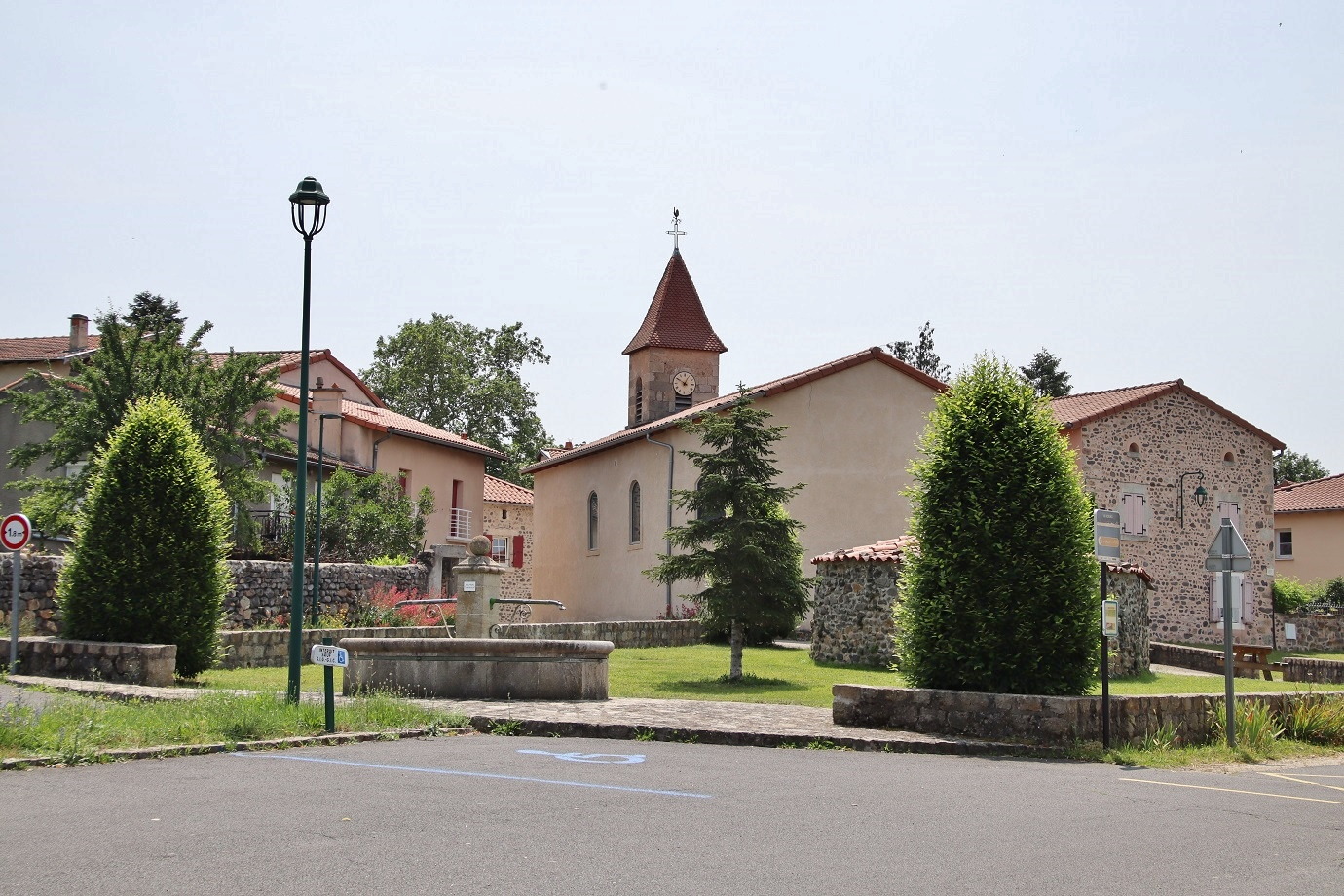
- Location of Le Monteil
- Location within France Location within Auvergne-Rhône-Alpes
- Coordinates: 45°03′59″N 3°54′56″E
- Country: France
- Region: Auvergne-Rhône-Alpes
- Department: Haute-Loire
- Arrondissement: Le Puy-en-Velay
- Canton: Le Puy-en-Velay-2
- Intercommunality: CA du Puy-en-Velay

Government
  - Mayor (2020–2026): Christophe Pal
- Area^{1}: 2.22 km^{2} (0.86 sq mi)
- Elevation: 600 m (2,000 ft)
- Highest elevation: 786 m (2,579 ft)
- Lowest elevation: 586 m (1,923 ft)
- Population (2023): 691
  - Density: 311/km^{2} (806/sq mi)
- Time zone: UTC+01:00 (CET)
  - Summer (DST): UTC+02:00 (CEST)
- INSEE/Postal code: 43140 /43700
- ^{1} French Land Register data, which excludes lakes, ponds, glaciers > 1 km^{2} (0.386 sq mi or 247 acres) and river estuaries.

Le Monteil (French pronunciation: [lə mɔ̃tɛj]; Occitan: Lo Montelh) is a commune in the Haute-Loire department in south-central France.

== Population ==
Historical population
Year	Pop.	±% p.a.
1968	237	—
1975	329	+4.80%
1982	446	+4.44%
1990	535	+2.30%
1999	538	+0.06%
2007	568	+0.68%
2012	611	+1.47%
2017	670	+1.86%
2023	691	+0.52%
Source: INSEE

== See also ==
- Communes of the Haute-Loire department
