= Canton of Le Puy-en-Velay-2 =

Coordinates: 45.045°N 3.884°E

The canton of Le Puy-en-Velay-2 is an administrative division of the Haute-Loire department, south-central France. It was created at the French canton reorganisation which came into effect in March 2015. Its seat is in Le Puy-en-Velay.

It consists of the following communes:

1. Aiguilhe
2. Chadrac
3. Chaspinhac
4. Le Monteil
5. Polignac
6. Le Puy-en-Velay (partly)
