= Chaspinhac =

- Commune
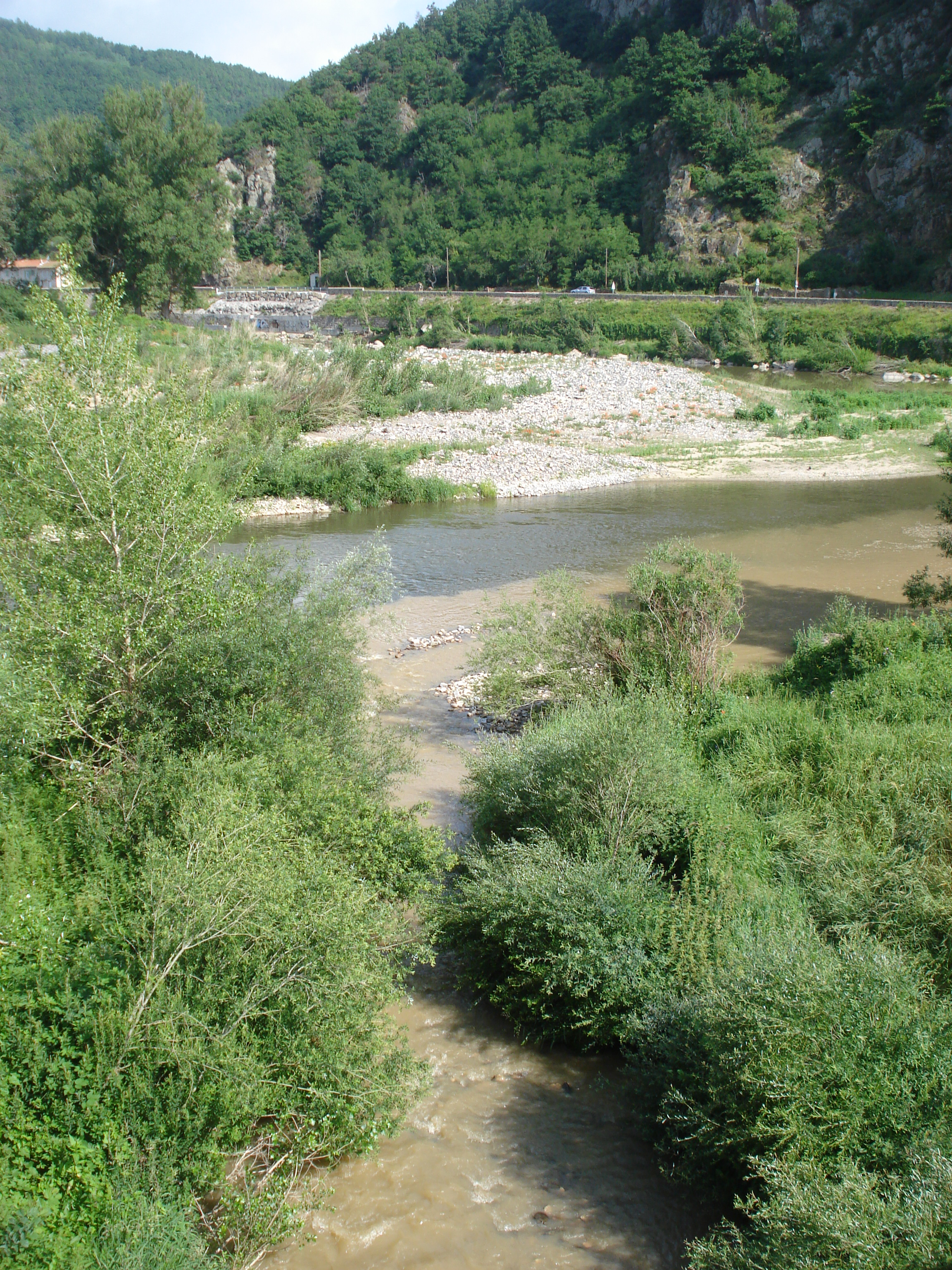
- Confluence of the Sumène and the Loire
- Location of Chaspinhac
- Location within France Location within Auvergne-Rhône-Alpes
- Coordinates: 45°05′13″N 3°56′43″E
- Country: France
- Region: Auvergne-Rhône-Alpes
- Department: Haute-Loire
- Arrondissement: Le Puy-en-Velay
- Canton: Le Puy-en-Velay-2
- Intercommunality: CA du Puy-en-Velay

Government
  - Mayor (2020–2026): Bernard Robert
- Area^{1}: 16.44 km^{2} (6.35 sq mi)
- Elevation: 815 m (2,674 ft)
- Highest elevation: 937 m (3,074 ft)
- Lowest elevation: 572 m (1,877 ft)
- Population (2023): 875
  - Density: 53.2/km^{2} (138/sq mi)
- Time zone: UTC+01:00 (CET)
  - Summer (DST): UTC+02:00 (CEST)
- INSEE/Postal code: 43061 /43700
- ^{1} French Land Register data, which excludes lakes, ponds, glaciers > 1 km^{2} (0.386 sq mi or 247 acres) and river estuaries.

Chaspinhac (French pronunciation: [ʃaspiɲak]) is a commune in the Haute-Loire department in south-central France.

== Population ==
Historical population
Year	Pop.	±% p.a.
1968	229	—
1975	258	+1.72%
1982	386	+5.92%
1990	484	+2.87%
1999	540	+1.22%
2007	690	+3.11%
2012	764	+2.06%
2017	845	+2.04%
2023	875	+0.58%
Source: INSEE

== See also ==
- Communes of the Haute-Loire department
