= Aiguilhe =

- Commune
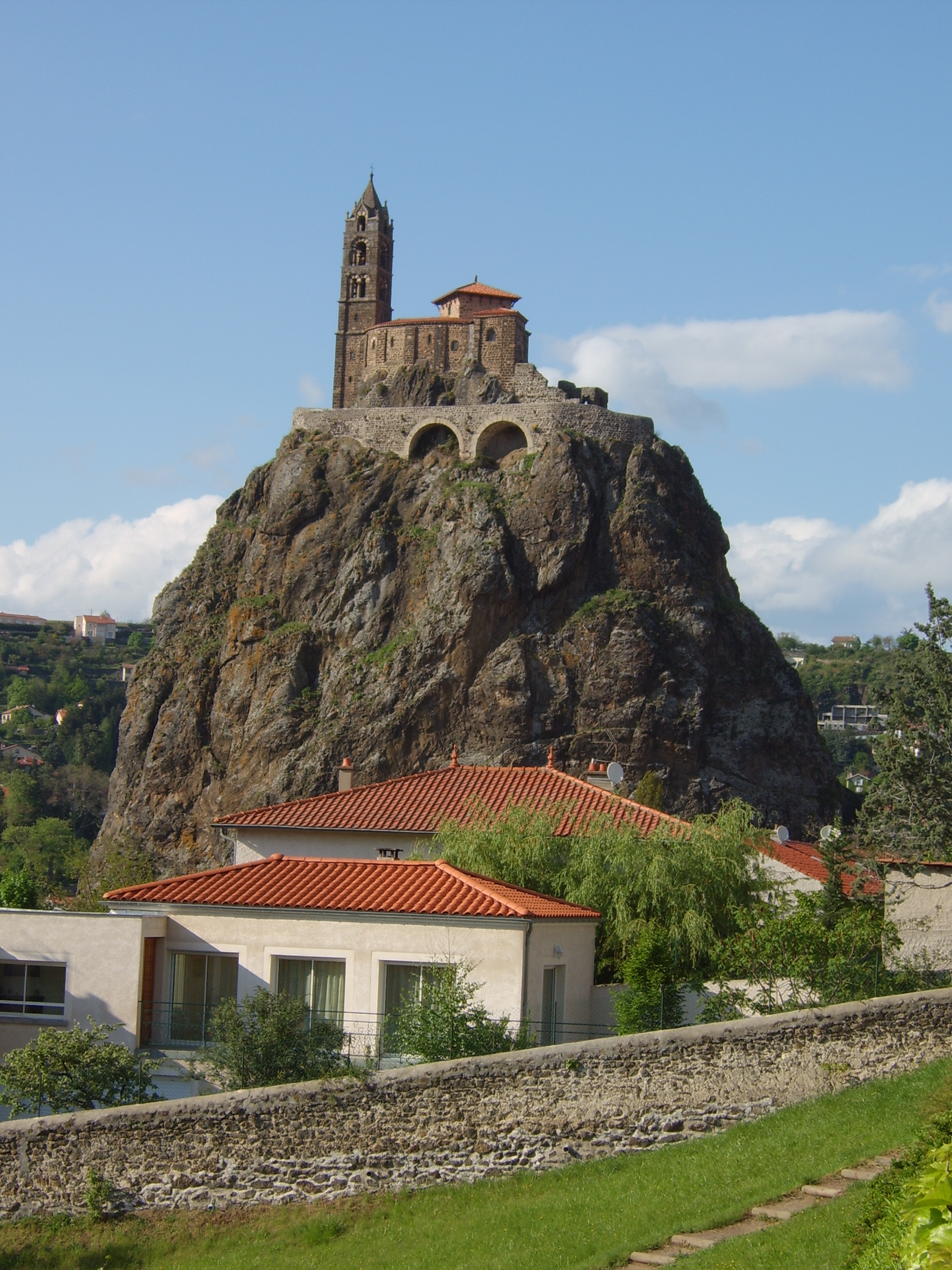
- Saint Michel d'Aiguilhe
- Location of Aiguilhe
- Location within France Location within Auvergne-Rhône-Alpes
- Coordinates: 45°03′06″N 3°53′08″E
- Country: France
- Region: Auvergne-Rhône-Alpes
- Department: Haute-Loire
- Arrondissement: Le Puy-en-Velay
- Canton: Le Puy-en-Velay-2
- Intercommunality: CA Le Puy-en-Velay

Government
  - Mayor (2020–2026): Daniel Joubert
- Area^{1}: 1.1 km^{2} (0.42 sq mi)
- Elevation: 650 m (2,130 ft)
- Highest elevation: 751 m (2,464 ft)
- Lowest elevation: 609 m (1,998 ft)
- Population (2023): 1,498
  - Density: 1,400/km^{2} (3,500/sq mi)
- Time zone: UTC+01:00 (CET)
  - Summer (DST): UTC+02:00 (CEST)
- INSEE/Postal code: 43002 /43000
- ^{1} French Land Register data, which excludes lakes, ponds, glaciers > 1 km^{2} (0.386 sq mi or 247 acres) and river estuaries.

Aiguilhe (French pronunciation: [egɥij]) is a commune in the Haute-Loire department in south-central France.

Aiguilhe is close to Le Puy-en-Velay, and famous for the Saint Michel chapel. Raymond of Aguilers was from here.

== Population ==
Historical population
Year	Pop.	±% p.a.
1968	1,137	—
1975	1,304	+1.98%
1982	1,376	+0.77%
1990	1,452	+0.67%
1999	1,555	+0.76%
2007	1,601	+0.37%
2012	1,569	−0.40%
2017	1,511	−0.75%
2023	1,498	−0.14%
Source: INSEE

== See also ==
- Communes of the Haute-Loire department
