= Saint Michel d'Aiguilhe =

Chapel in Aiguilhe, near Le Puy-en-Velay, France

Coordinates: 45°3′0″N 3°52′57″E

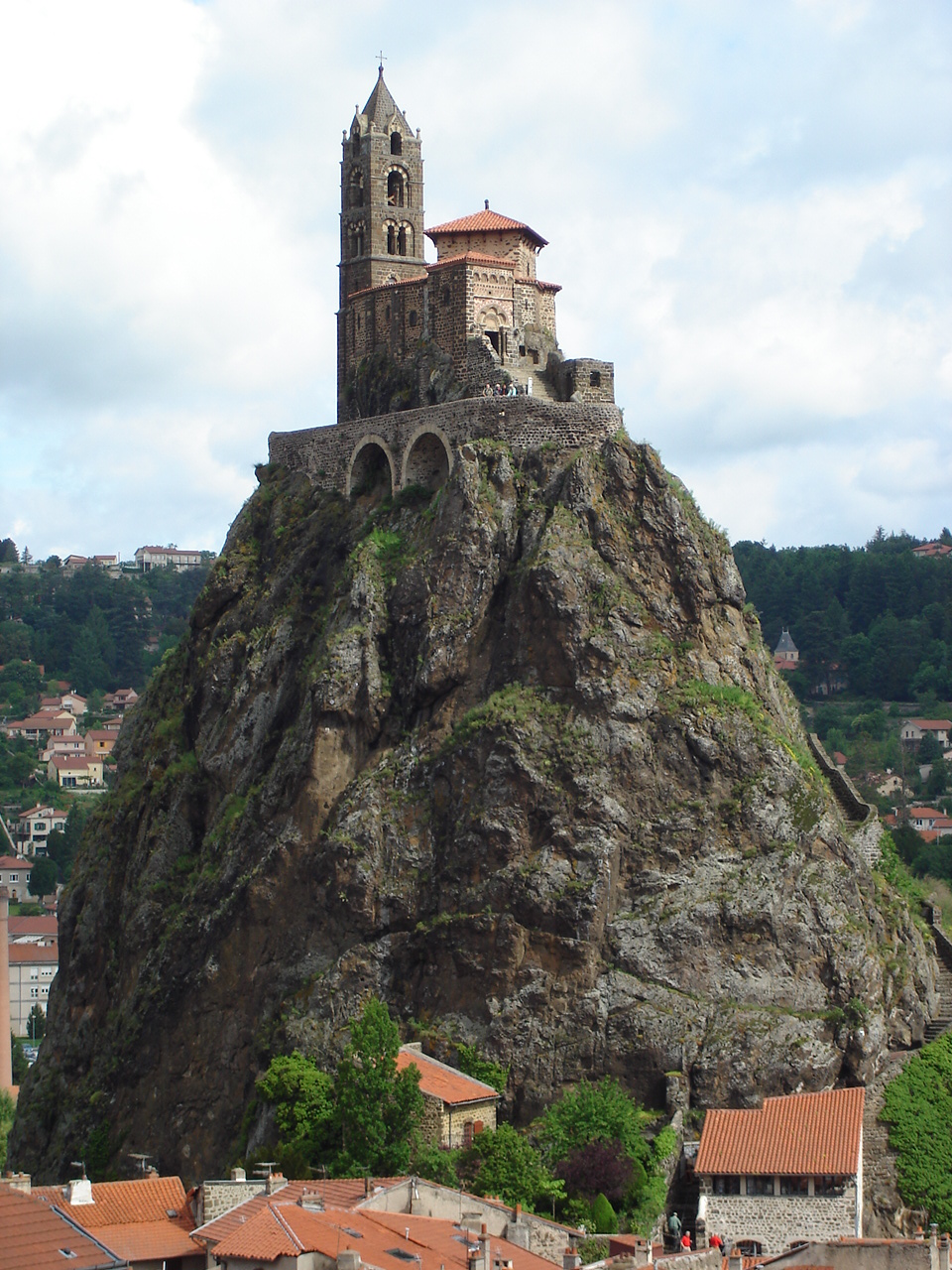

Religion
- Affiliation: Catholic Church
- Patron: The Archangel Michael

Location
- Location: Aiguilhe, Le Puy-en-Velay, France
- Interactive map of Saint Michel d'Aiguilhe

Architecture
- Type: Chapel
- Style: Romanesque
- Completed: 969
- Height (max): 85 metres (279 ft)

Saint-Michel d'Aiguilhe (St. Michael of the Needle) is a chapel in Aiguilhe, near Le Puy-en-Velay, France. The chapel is reached by 268 steps carved into the rock. It was built in 969 on a volcanic plug 85 metres (279 ft) high. The surface on top of the plug is 57 metres (187 ft) in diameter.

Bishop Godescalc of Le Puy-en-Velay had the chapel built to celebrate his return from the pilgrimage of Saint James in 951. The chapel is dedicated to the Archangel Michael, the patron of mountaintops and other high places.

A prehistoric dolmen dedicated to Mercury by the Romans was built on the volcanic plug before the construction of the chapel. Three stones from this dolmen are said to be incorporated into the chapel.

In the 12th century, the chapel was enlarged, and a nave, ambulatory, two side chapels, a narthex, a carved portal, more frescoes, and a bell tower were added. The bell tower was built in the style of the nearby Cathedral Notre-Dame-du-Puy.

== Discovery of reliquary objects ==
During restoration work on 20 April 1955, the nineteenth-century marble facing of the high altar was removed, revealing beneath a rectangular Romanesque altar slab (1.46 m × 0.95 m × 0.16 m) hewn from a local breccia and supported on a reused Gallo-Roman column fragment. The slab covered a circular cavity cut into the volcanic rock, within which lay a hoard of medieval reliquary objects enclosed by two nested copper plates engraved with concentric circles.

Among the finds was a small polychrome wooden crucifix of Byzantine style, its two-part cross housing a central reliquary chamber, and a silver pectoral cross (45 mm × 32 mm) depicting the Virgin and Child with Greek sigla "MP ΘΥ". A square ivory casket (15 cm × 15 cm × 12 cm), mounted with gilt-copper corner fittings and once secured by a now-lost lock, contained another tiny silver cross-reliquary and fragments of wood and textile. In addition, two copper plates, several fragments of silk samite and lampas decorated with griffin and palmette motifs, a linen fragment bearing traces of polychrome painting, and a small wooden ampulla were recovered, indicating a diverse assemblage of objects typical of pilgrimage and Crusader networks.

Stylistic and material analysis suggests most items date to the late eleventh or early twelfth century and derive from eastern Mediterranean workshops, possibly brought back by pilgrims en route to or returning from the Holy Land. The objects were left in situ beneath the altar, later placed in a glazed display case in the south wall of the sanctuary, where they were accessible to visitors.

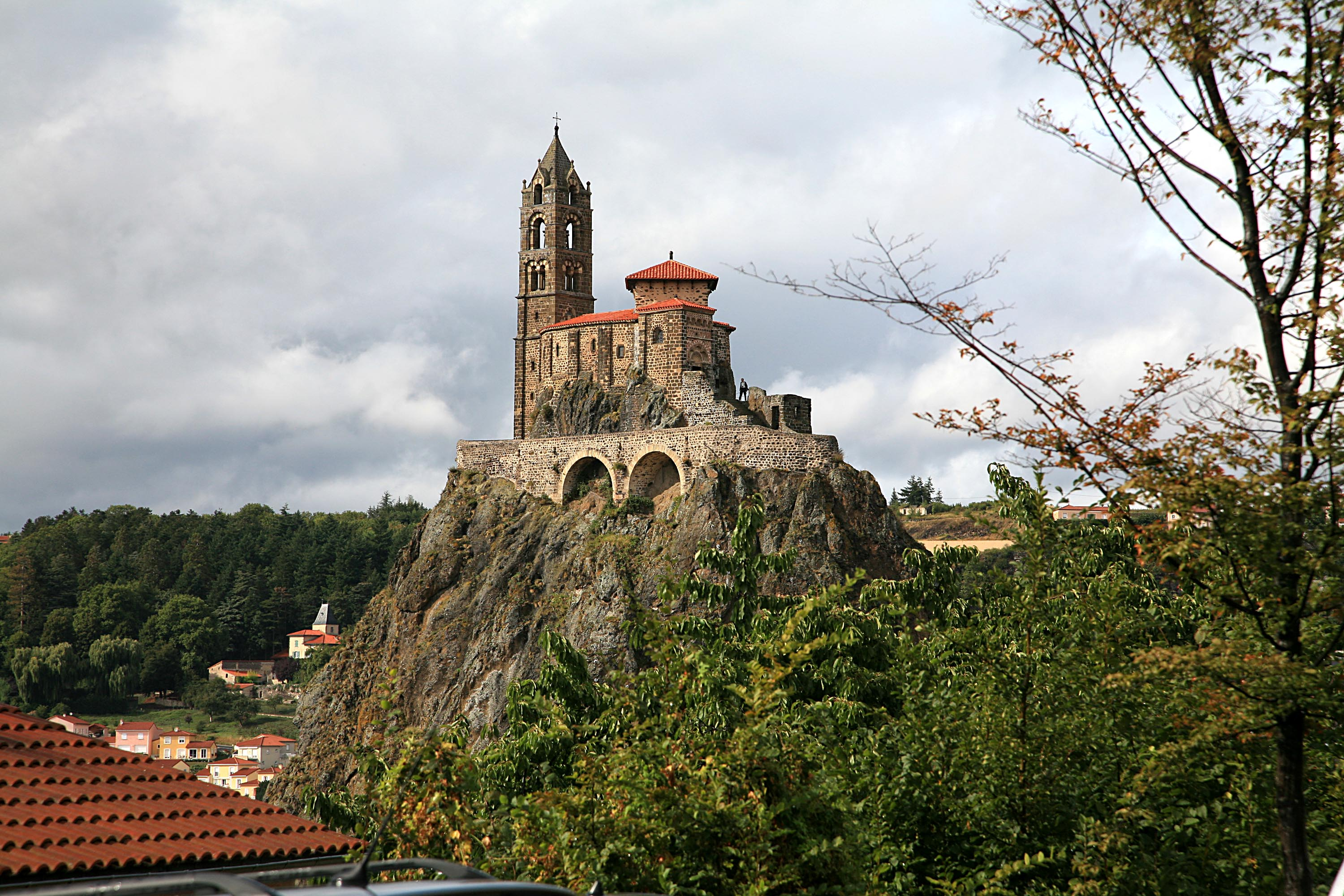
Chapel Saint Michel d'Aiguilhe

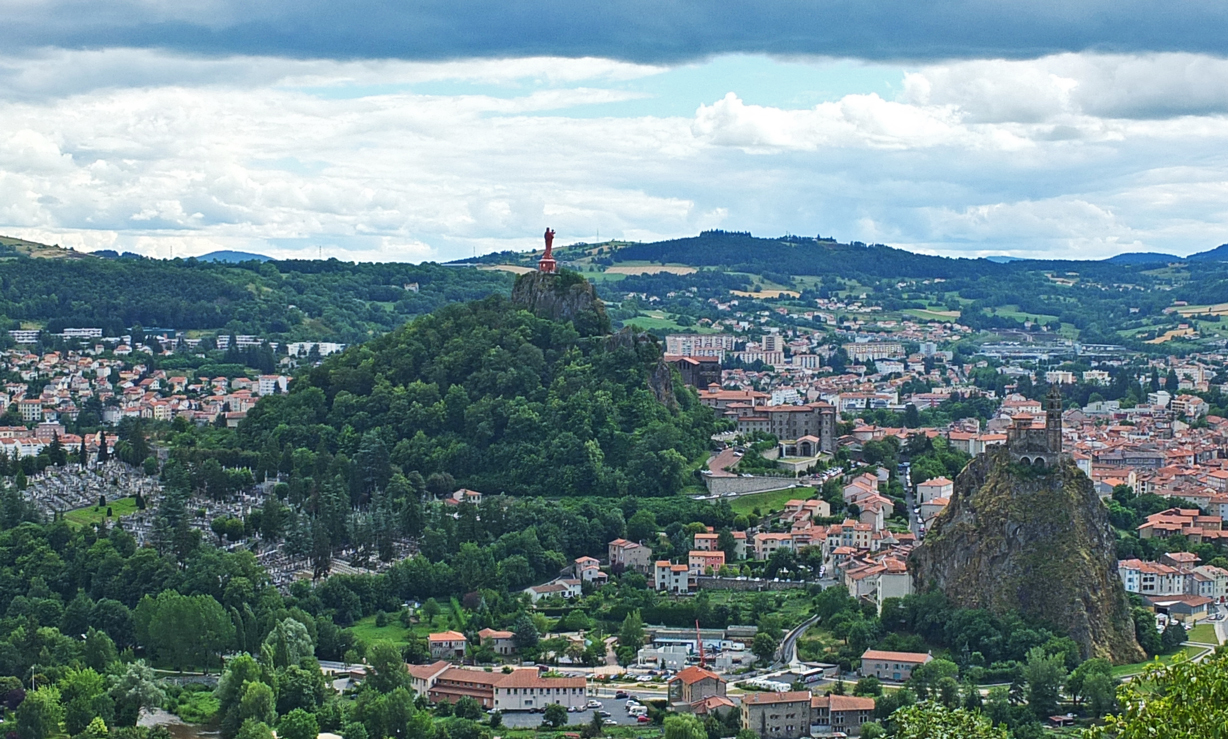
View from Chapel Saint Michel d'Aiguilhe

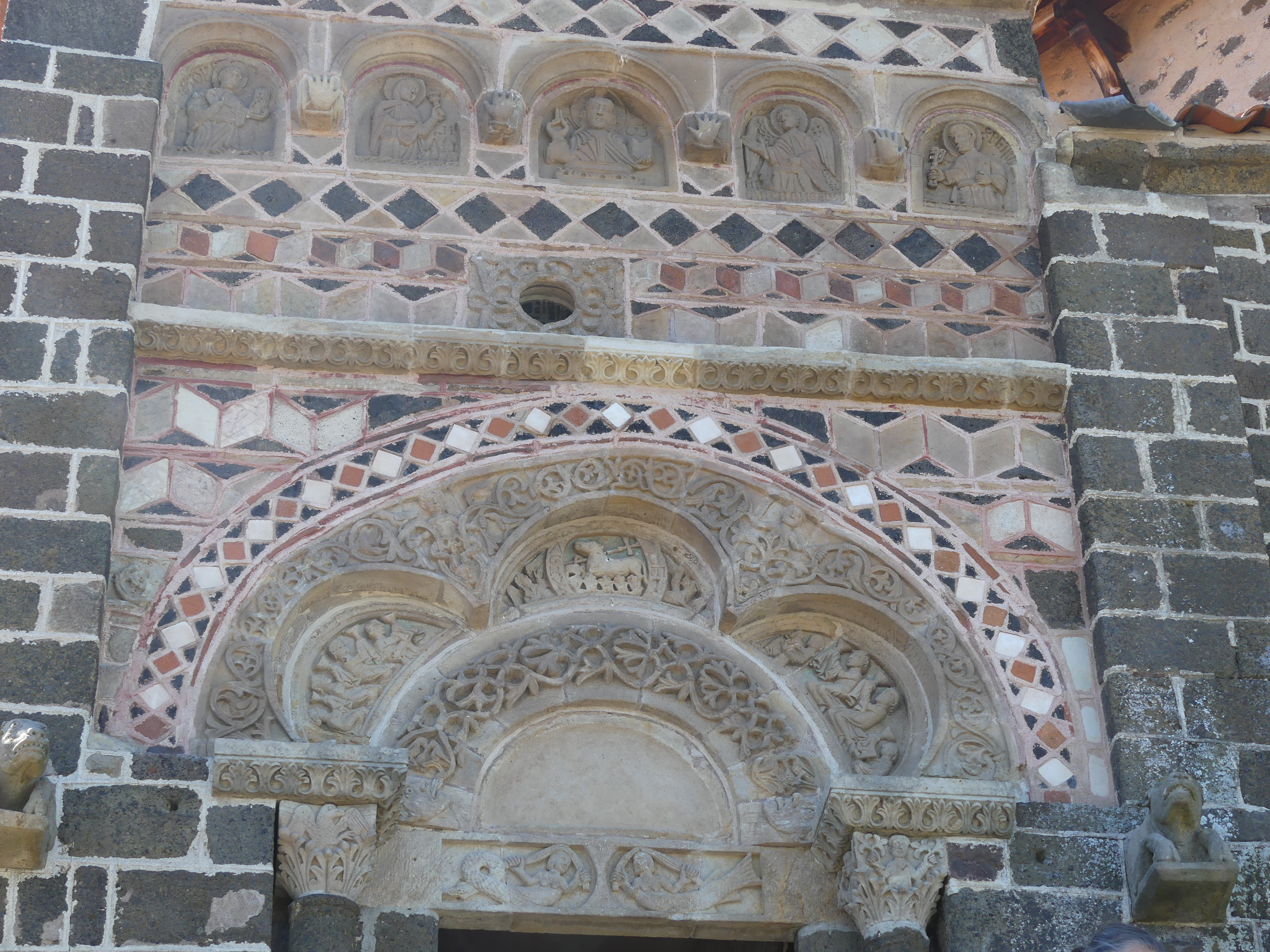
Facade of Chapel Saint Michel d'Aiguilhe

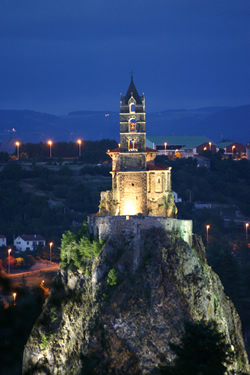
Chapel Saint Michel d'Aiguilhe lit up at night

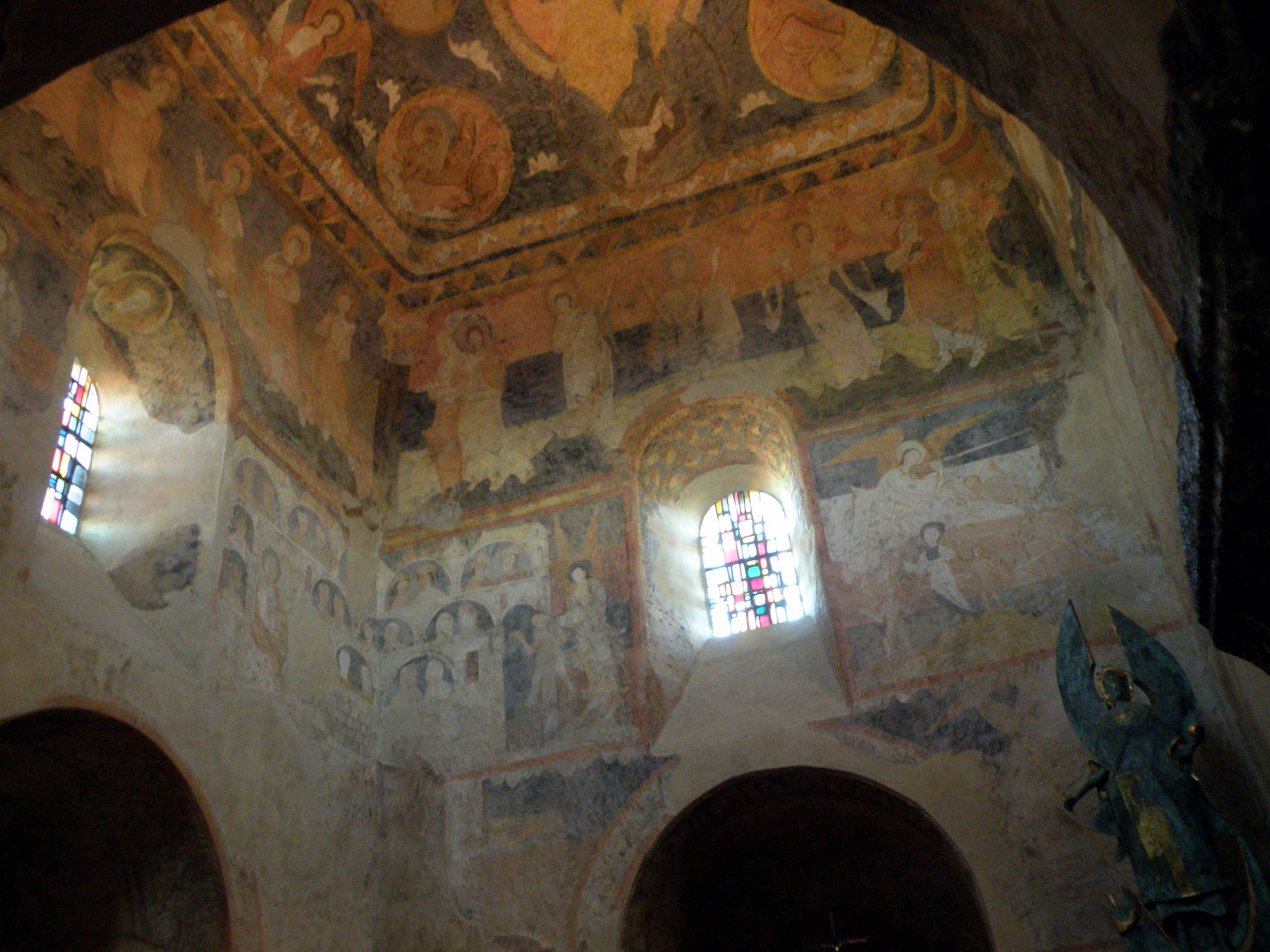
Interior of Chapel Saint Michel d'Aiguilhe

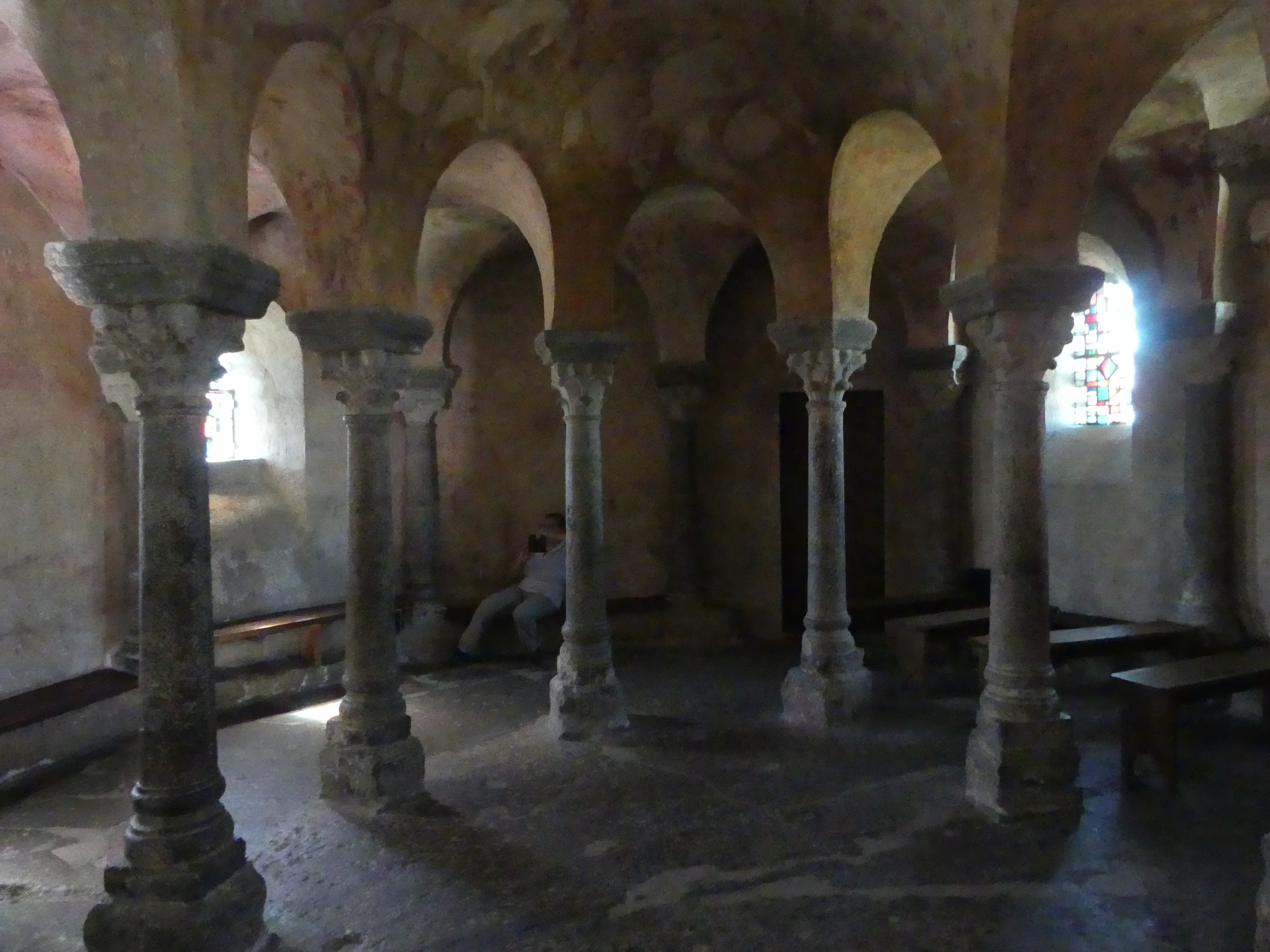
Interior of Chapel Saint Michel d'Aiguilhe

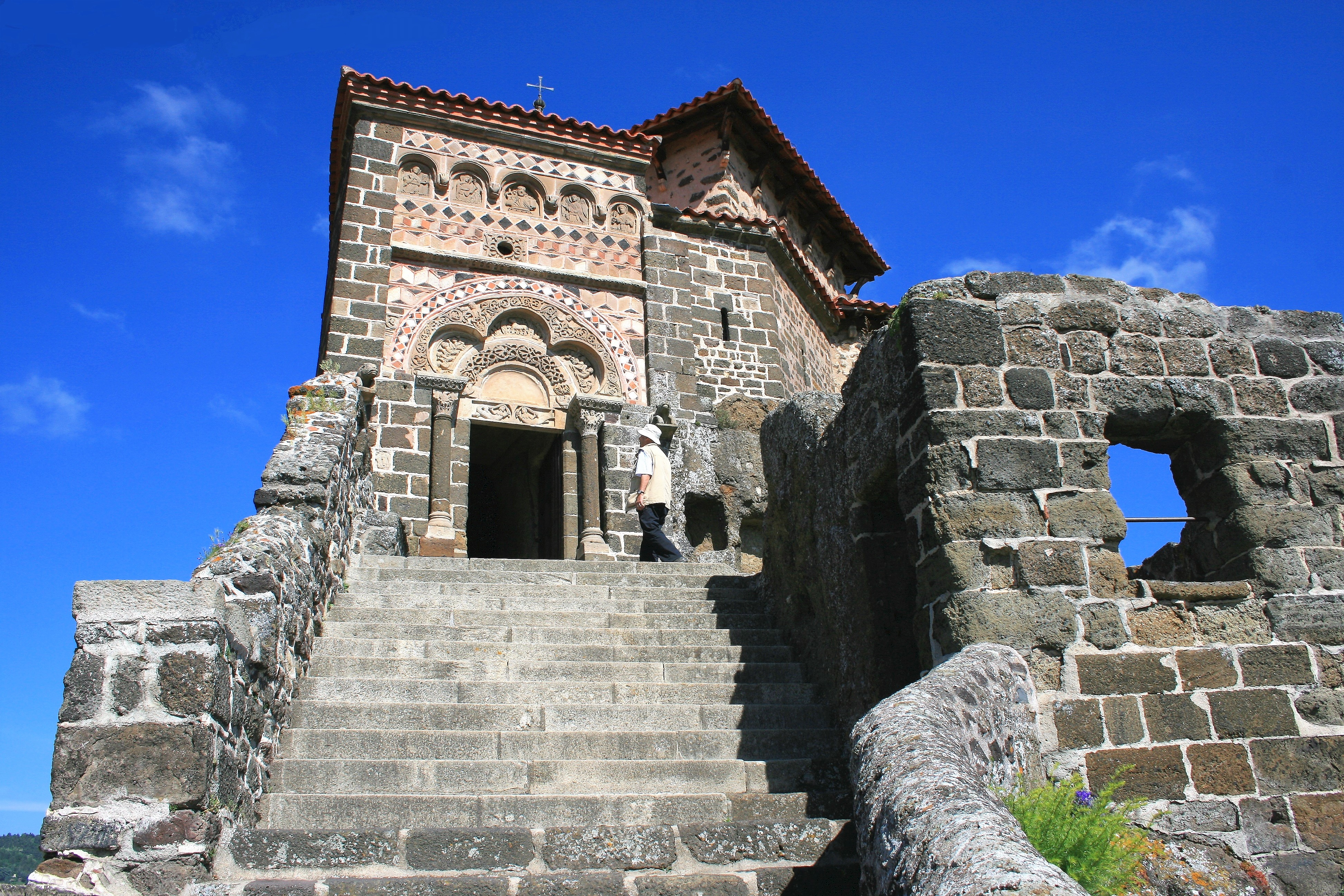
Exterior and facade of Chapel Saint Michel d'Aiguilhe

== See also ==
- High medieval domes
