= Geron =

Geron may refer to:

Places and jurisdictions

- Girona, a city in Catalonia
- Curiate Italian name of Hieron, Caria (Asian Turkey), as Latin Catholic titular see in
- Saint-Géron, a commune in France

Other

- Saint Gereon of Köln
- Geron, an elder (from the Greek "γέρων") of an Orthodox monastery (starets in Russian)
- Geron Corporation, an American biotechnology company
- Geron (fly), a genus of insects in the family Bombyliidae

== See also ==
- Gerona (disambiguation)
