= Paulhac =

Paulhac may refer to several places in France:

- Paulhac, Cantal, in the Cantal department
- Paulhac, Haute-Garonne, in the Haute-Garonne department
- Paulhac, Haute-Loire, in the Haute-Loire department
