= Château de Domeyrat =

Castle in Auvergne-Rhône-Alpes, France

Coordinates: 45°15′5″N 3°30′5″E

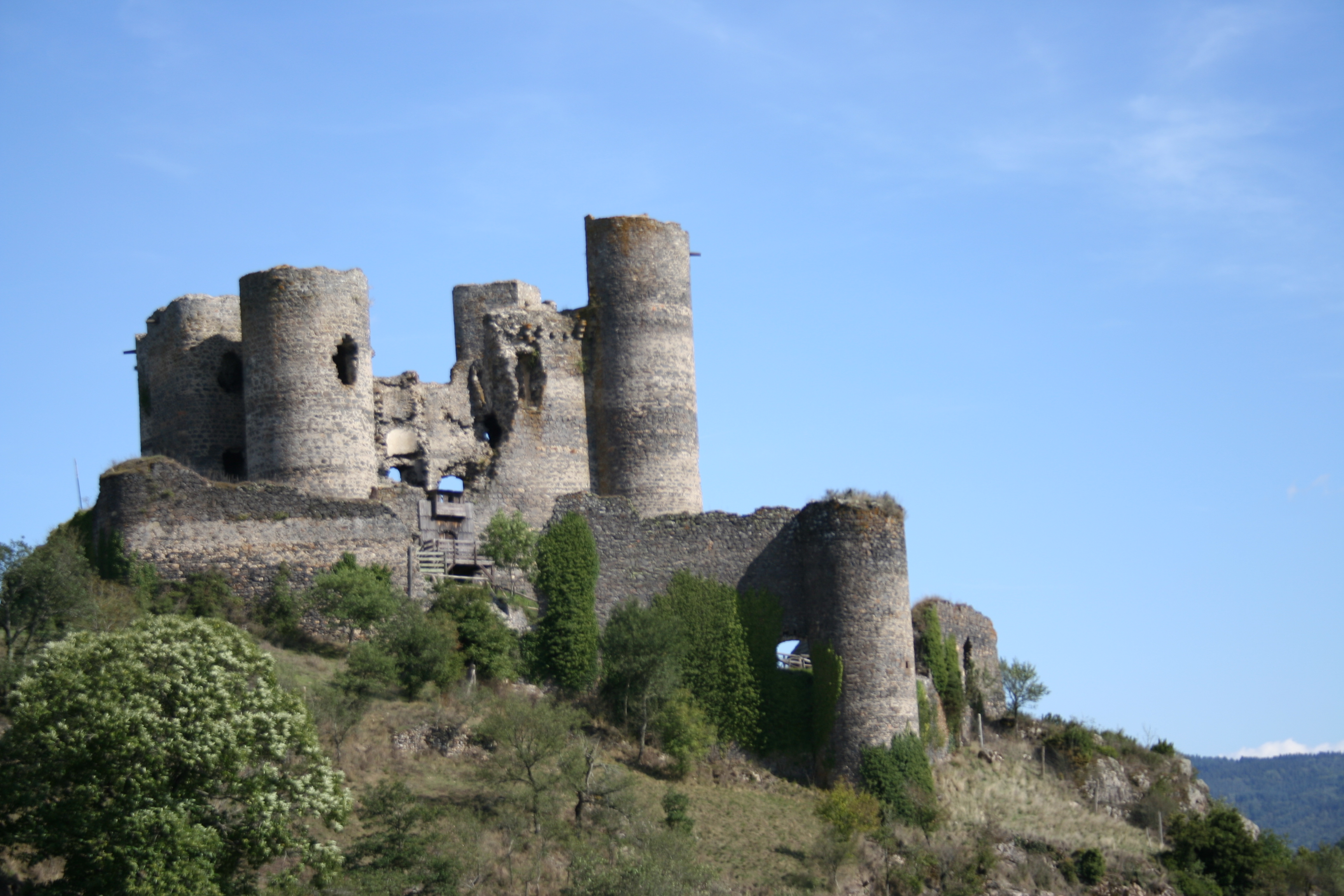
Château de Domeyrat

The Château de Domeyrat is a castle of Auvergne. It is located in the commune of Domeyrat, in the Haute-Loire department of central France.

It has been listed since 1983 as a monument historique by the French Ministry of Culture.

== History ==
A first mention of the castle was in the inventory of Alphonse de Poitiers' vassals, done between 1250 and 1260. It was then a property of the Papabeuf family. The lineage seems to have been extinct in 1348, probably due to the plague; the castle went from hand to hand and may have been abandoned during the Hundred Years' War.

Adhemar de Jori (de Jory), was the Lord of Domeyrat in 1375.

In 1387 the new lord of Domeyrat was Pons de Langheac, seneschal of Auvergne. His son inherited the title in 1421. He has deeply restructured the castle and is considered as the second builder, hence there are different opinions about the date of construction. The de Langheac family kept the castle until 1656.

The edifice was less and less maintained by its successive owners and began to be dismantled during the French Revolution.

Bought by the Conseil général of Haute-Loire, it was listed as a Historical monument in 1983. The castle is now managed by an association, «Et Tant d'Arts...», performing entertainment on medieval theme.

== Architecture ==
On the slope of a small hill, the Château de Domeyrat overlooks the village and the valley of the Senouire River.

A rectangular curtain with a round tower at each angle protects the main building and the keep, without courtyard; it is surrounded by a second enceinte.

Two of the angle towers are decorated with paintings of the 16th century (hunting scenes in the north-western tower, religious scenes in the south-western tower, where the chapel was.

== See also ==
- List of castles in France

== Sources ==
After the article Domeyrat, in French Wikipedia
