= Girona (disambiguation) =

- Girona is a city in the northeast of Catalonia, Spain.

Girona may also refer to:

- Province of Girona, containing the city
- Girona Station (disambiguation), the name of several stations in Catalonia
- Girona (ship), a galleass of the 1588 Spanish Armada
- Girona–Costa Brava Airport, near Girona
- Girona FC, a Spanish football team based in Girona
- Mario Girona (1924–2008) Cuban architect

== See also ==
- Girona region (disambiguation)
- Gerona (disambiguation)
- Kiruna, a city in Sweden
