= Domeyrat =

- Commune
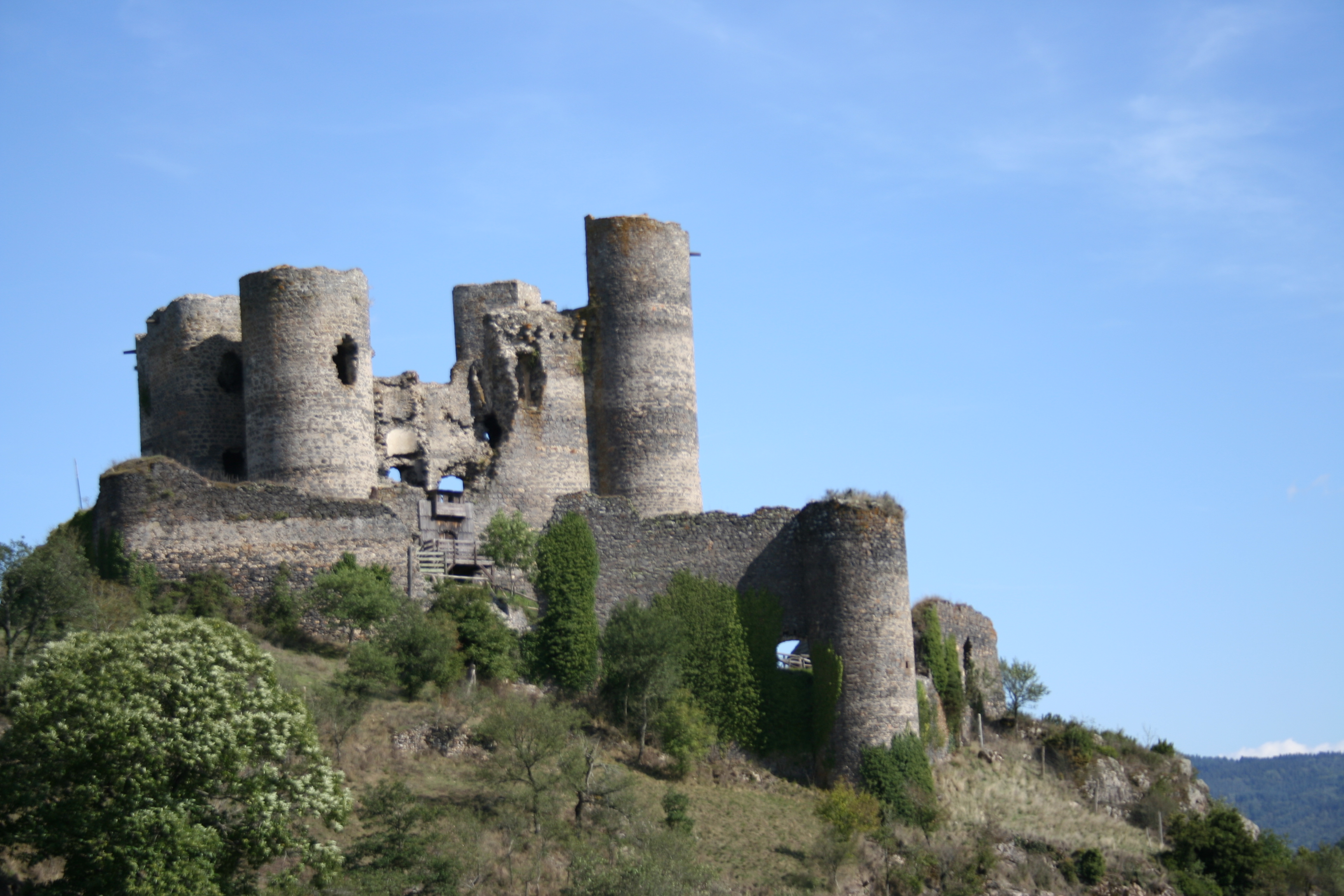
- Château de Domeyrat
- Location of Domeyrat
- Location within France Location within Auvergne-Rhône-Alpes
- Coordinates: 45°15′00″N 3°30′09″E
- Country: France
- Region: Auvergne-Rhône-Alpes
- Department: Haute-Loire
- Arrondissement: Brioude
- Canton: Pays de Lafayette

Government
  - Mayor (2020–2026): Christophe Brugerolle
- Area^{1}: 9.57 km^{2} (3.69 sq mi)
- Elevation: 499 m (1,637 ft)
- Highest elevation: 752 m (2,467 ft)
- Lowest elevation: 472 m (1,549 ft)
- Population (2023): 176
  - Density: 18.4/km^{2} (47.6/sq mi)
- Time zone: UTC+01:00 (CET)
  - Summer (DST): UTC+02:00 (CEST)
- INSEE/Postal code: 43086 /43230
- ^{1} French Land Register data, which excludes lakes, ponds, glaciers > 1 km^{2} (0.386 sq mi or 247 acres) and river estuaries.

Domeyrat (French pronunciation: [dɔmeʁa]; Occitan: Daumairac) is a commune in the Haute-Loire department in south-central France.

== Geography ==
The Senouire flows north-northwest through the commune and crosses the village.

== Population ==
Historical population
Year	Pop.	±% p.a.
1968	212	—
1975	186	−1.85%
1982	181	−0.39%
1990	145	−2.73%
1999	144	−0.08%
2007	164	+1.64%
2012	203	+4.36%
2017	194	−0.90%
2023	176	−1.61%
Source: INSEE

== See also ==
- Communes of the Haute-Loire department
