= Beaumont, Haute-Loire =

Beaumont
- Commune
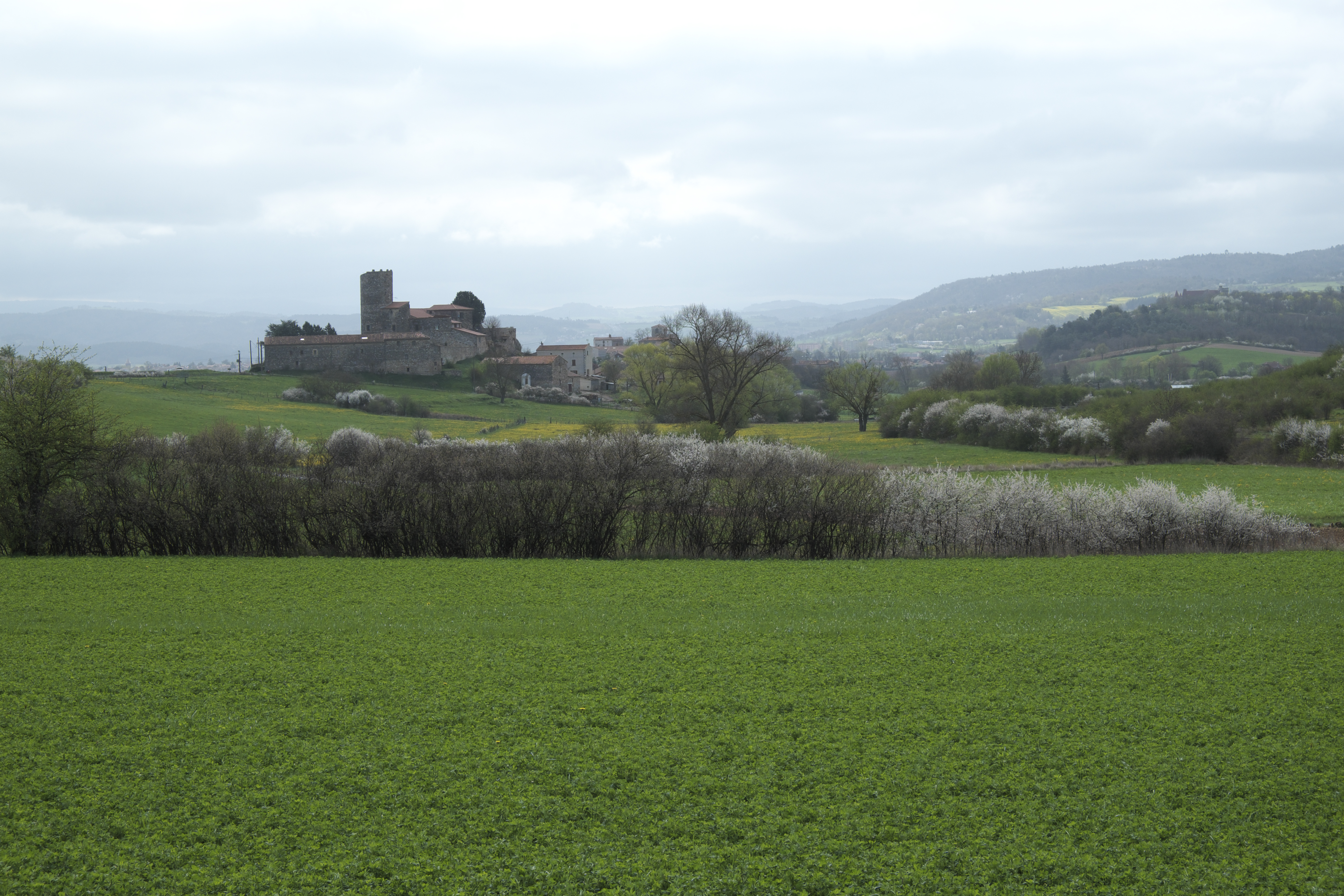
- Château de Lauriat
- Location of Beaumont
- Location within France Location within Auvergne-Rhône-Alpes
- Coordinates: 45°18′51″N 3°20′32″E
- Country: France
- Region: Auvergne-Rhône-Alpes
- Department: Haute-Loire
- Arrondissement: Brioude
- Canton: Brioude

Government
  - Mayor (2020–2026): Jacques Vacheron
- Area^{1}: 12.03 km^{2} (4.64 sq mi)
- Elevation: 442 m (1,450 ft)
- Highest elevation: 692 m (2,270 ft)
- Lowest elevation: 421 m (1,381 ft)
- Population (2023): 268
  - Density: 22.3/km^{2} (57.7/sq mi)
- Time zone: UTC+01:00 (CET)
  - Summer (DST): UTC+02:00 (CEST)
- INSEE/Postal code: 43022 /43100
- ^{1} French Land Register data, which excludes lakes, ponds, glaciers > 1 km^{2} (0.386 sq mi or 247 acres) and river estuaries.

Beaumont (French pronunciation: [bomɔ̃]) is a commune in the Haute-Loire department in south-central France.

== Population ==
Historical population
Year	Pop.	±% p.a.
1968	188	—
1975	172	−1.26%
1982	254	+5.73%
1990	231	−1.18%
1999	237	+0.29%
2007	269	+1.60%
2012	271	+0.15%
2017	286	+1.08%
2023	268	−1.08%
Source: INSEE

== See also ==
- Communes of the Haute-Loire department
