= Collat =

- Commune
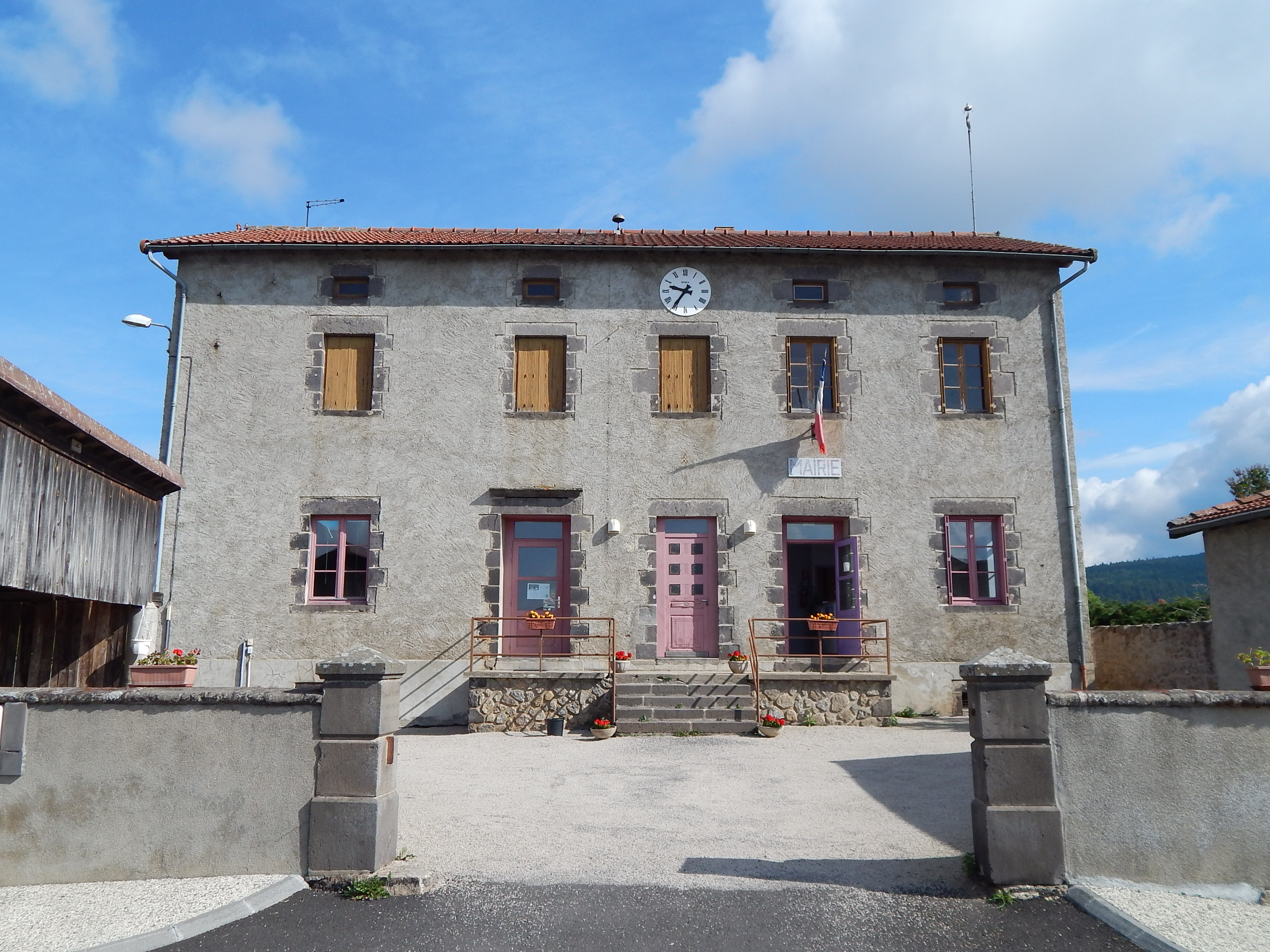
- Town hall
- Location of Collat
- Location within France Location within Auvergne-Rhône-Alpes
- Coordinates: 45°14′41″N 3°36′43″E
- Country: France
- Region: Auvergne-Rhône-Alpes
- Department: Haute-Loire
- Arrondissement: Brioude
- Canton: Pays de Lafayette

Government
  - Mayor (2020–2026): Marie-Christine Delabre
- Area^{1}: 10.22 km^{2} (3.95 sq mi)
- Elevation: 995 m (3,264 ft)
- Highest elevation: 1,191 m (3,907 ft)
- Lowest elevation: 687 m (2,254 ft)
- Population (2023): 77
  - Density: 7.5/km^{2} (20/sq mi)
- Time zone: UTC+01:00 (CET)
  - Summer (DST): UTC+02:00 (CEST)
- INSEE/Postal code: 43075 /43230
- ^{1} French Land Register data, which excludes lakes, ponds, glaciers > 1 km^{2} (0.386 sq mi or 247 acres) and river estuaries.

Collat (French pronunciation: [kɔla]) is a commune in the Haute-Loire department in south-central France.

== Geography ==
The Senouire forms most of the commune's southeastern border.

== Population ==
Historical population
Year	Pop.	±% p.a.
1968	175	—
1975	157	−1.54%
1982	124	−3.31%
1990	96	−3.15%
1999	80	−2.01%
2007	85	+0.76%
2012	87	+0.47%
2017	78	−2.16%
2023	77	−0.21%
Source: INSEE

== See also ==
- Communes of the Haute-Loire department
