= Vieille-Brioude =

- Commune
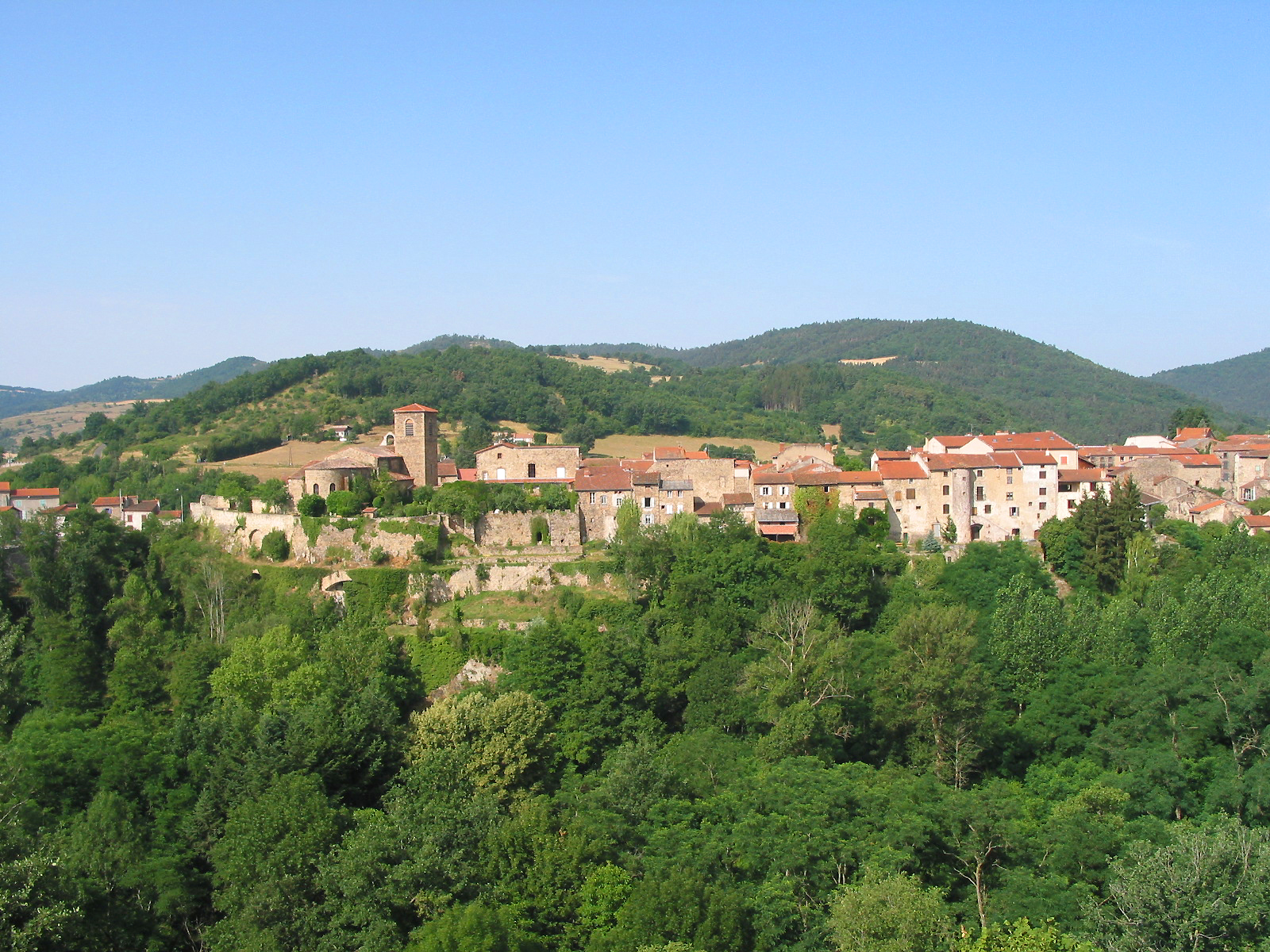

- Coat of arms
- Location of Vieille-Brioude
- Location within France Location within Auvergne-Rhône-Alpes
- Coordinates: 45°16′39″N 3°24′15″E
- Country: France
- Region: Auvergne-Rhône-Alpes
- Department: Haute-Loire
- Arrondissement: Brioude
- Canton: Brioude

Government
  - Mayor (2020–2026): Roland Pïerre Chareyron
- Area^{1}: 27.7 km^{2} (10.7 sq mi)
- Elevation: 443 m (1,453 ft)
- Highest elevation: 725 m (2,379 ft)
- Lowest elevation: 425 m (1,394 ft)
- Population (2023): 1,236
  - Density: 44.6/km^{2} (116/sq mi)
- Time zone: UTC+01:00 (CET)
  - Summer (DST): UTC+02:00 (CEST)
- INSEE/Postal code: 43262 /43100
- ^{1} French Land Register data, which excludes lakes, ponds, glaciers > 1 km^{2} (0.386 sq mi or 247 acres) and river estuaries.

Vieille-Brioude (French pronunciation: [vjɛj bʁijud], literally Old Brioude; Occitan: Vièlha Briude) is a commune in the Haute-Loire department in south-central France.

== Geography ==
The Senouire forms part of the commune's northeastern border, and then flows into the Allier, which flows north through the commune.

== Population ==
Historical population
| Year | Pop. | ±% p.a. |
|---|---|---|
| 1968 | 600 | — |
| 1975 | 645 | +1.04% |
| 1982 | 770 | +2.56% |
| 1990 | 1,007 | +3.41% |
| 1999 | 1,099 | +0.98% |
| 2007 | 1,203 | +1.14% |
| 2012 | 1,225 | +0.36% |
| 2017 | 1,194 | −0.51% |
| 2023 | 1,236 | +0.58% |
Source: INSEE

== Personalities ==
- Pierre de Vieille-Brioude

== See also ==
- Pont de Vieille-Brioude
- Communes of the Haute-Loire department
