= Connangles =

- Commune
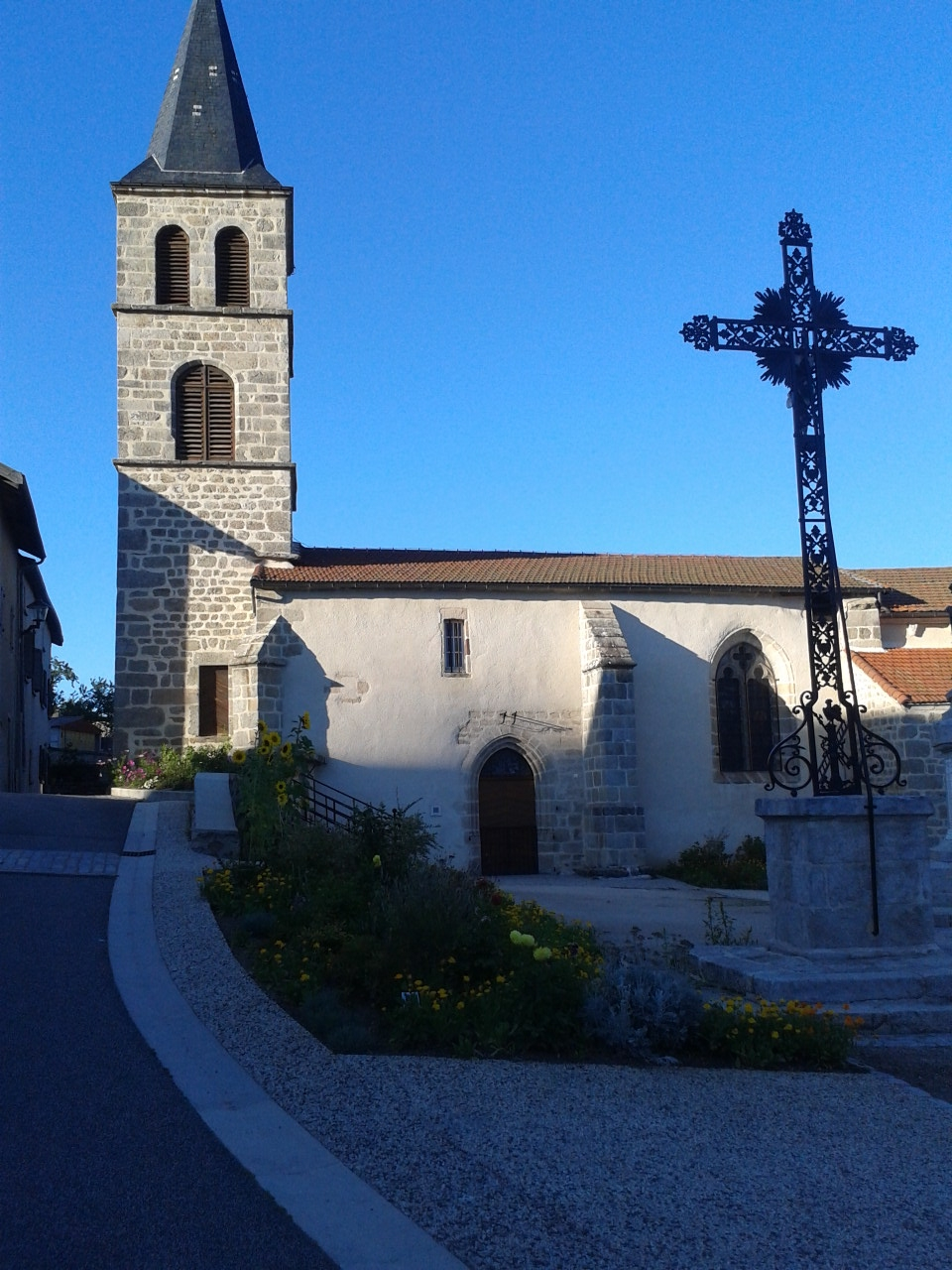
- Location of Connangles
- Location within France Location within Auvergne-Rhône-Alpes
- Coordinates: 45°17′59″N 3°38′53″E
- Country: France
- Region: Auvergne-Rhône-Alpes
- Department: Haute-Loire
- Arrondissement: Brioude
- Canton: Plateau du Haut-Velay granitique
- Intercommunality: CA du Puy-en-Velay

Government
  - Mayor (2020–2026): Maryse Pourrat
- Area^{1}: 21.89 km^{2} (8.45 sq mi)
- Elevation: 950 m (3,120 ft)
- Highest elevation: 1,145 m (3,757 ft)
- Lowest elevation: 873 m (2,864 ft)
- Population (2023): 131
  - Density: 5.98/km^{2} (15.5/sq mi)
- Time zone: UTC+01:00 (CET)
  - Summer (DST): UTC+02:00 (CEST)
- INSEE/Postal code: 43076 /43160
- ^{1} French Land Register data, which excludes lakes, ponds, glaciers > 1 km^{2} (0.386 sq mi or 247 acres) and river estuaries.

Connangles (French pronunciation: [kɔnɑ̃ɡl]) is a commune in the Haute-Loire department in south-central France.

== Geography ==
The Senouire forms most of the commune's northeastern border, then flows southwest through its southeastern part.

== Population ==
Historical population
| Year | Pop. | ±% p.a. |
|---|---|---|
| 1968 | 270 | — |
| 1975 | 229 | −2.33% |
| 1982 | 202 | −1.78% |
| 1990 | 154 | −3.33% |
| 1999 | 129 | −1.95% |
| 2007 | 135 | +0.57% |
| 2012 | 138 | +0.44% |
| 2017 | 146 | +1.13% |
| 2023 | 131 | −1.79% |
Source: INSEE

== See also ==
- Communes of the Haute-Loire department
