= Saint-Laurent-Chabreuges =

- Commune
- Location of Saint-Laurent-Chabreuges
- Location within France Location within Auvergne-Rhône-Alpes
- Coordinates: 45°16′48″N 3°20′31″E
- Country: France
- Region: Auvergne-Rhône-Alpes
- Department: Haute-Loire
- Arrondissement: Brioude
- Canton: Brioude
- Intercommunality: Brioude Sud Auvergne

Government
  - Mayor (2020–2026): Gaston Farget
- Area^{1}: 8.27 km^{2} (3.19 sq mi)
- Elevation: 520 m (1,710 ft)
- Highest elevation: 683 m (2,241 ft)
- Lowest elevation: 477 m (1,565 ft)
- Population (2023): 253
  - Density: 30.6/km^{2} (79.2/sq mi)
- Time zone: UTC+01:00 (CET)
  - Summer (DST): UTC+02:00 (CEST)
- INSEE/Postal code: 43207 /43100
- ^{1} French Land Register data, which excludes lakes, ponds, glaciers > 1 km^{2} (0.386 sq mi or 247 acres) and river estuaries.

Saint-Laurent-Chabreuges (French pronunciation: [sɛ̃ loʁɑ̃ ʃabʁœʒ]; Occitan: Sent Laurenç de Chabruejol) is a commune in the Haute-Loire department in south-central France.

== Population ==
Historical population
Year	Pop.	±% p.a.
1968	104	—
1975	131	+3.35%
1982	186	+5.14%
1990	271	+4.82%
1999	243	−1.20%
2007	243	+0.00%
2012	238	−0.41%
2017	257	+1.55%
2023	253	−0.26%
Source: INSEE

== See also ==
- Communes of the Haute-Loire department
