= Frugières-le-Pin =

- Commune
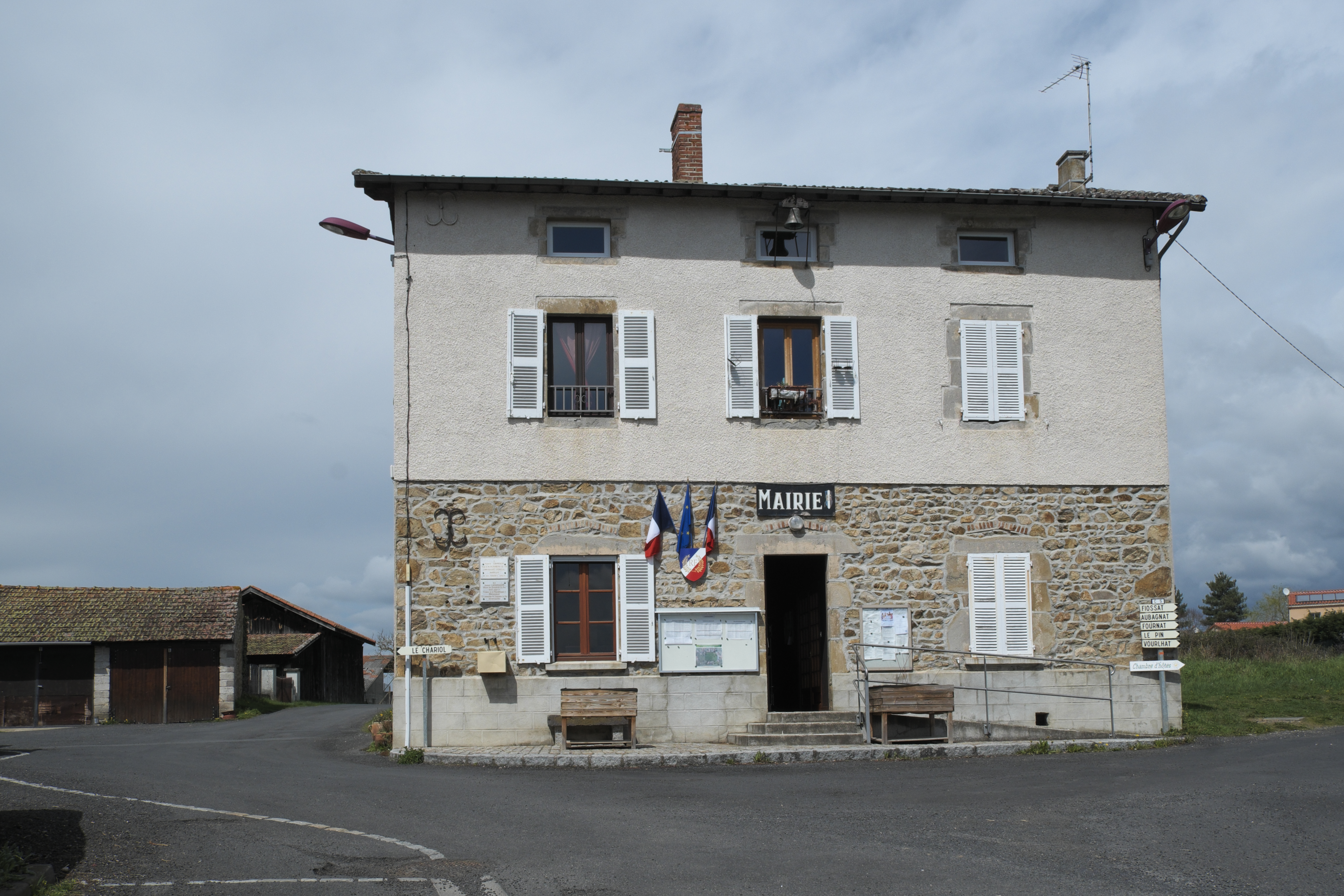
- Town hall
- Location of Frugières-le-Pin
- Location within France Location within Auvergne-Rhône-Alpes
- Coordinates: 45°16′09″N 3°29′19″E
- Country: France
- Region: Auvergne-Rhône-Alpes
- Department: Haute-Loire
- Arrondissement: Brioude
- Canton: Pays de Lafayette

Government
  - Mayor (2020–2026): Maurice Laurent
- Area^{1}: 11.57 km^{2} (4.47 sq mi)
- Elevation: 488 m (1,601 ft)
- Highest elevation: 766 m (2,513 ft)
- Lowest elevation: 467 m (1,532 ft)
- Population (2023): 185
  - Density: 16.0/km^{2} (41.4/sq mi)
- Time zone: UTC+01:00 (CET)
  - Summer (DST): UTC+02:00 (CEST)
- INSEE/Postal code: 43100 /43230
- ^{1} French Land Register data, which excludes lakes, ponds, glaciers > 1 km^{2} (0.386 sq mi or 247 acres) and river estuaries.

Frugières-le-Pin (French pronunciation: [fʁyʒjɛʁ lə pɛ̃]) is a commune in the Haute-Loire department in south-central France.

== Geography ==
The Senouire forms most of the commune's southern boundary.

== Population ==
Historical population
Year	Pop.	±% p.a.
1968	213	—
1975	149	−4.98%
1982	120	−3.04%
1990	131	+1.10%
1999	121	−0.88%
2007	145	+2.29%
2012	138	−0.98%
2017	159	+2.87%
2023	185	+2.56%
Source: INSEE

== See also ==
- Communes of the Haute-Loire department
