= Arboretum de Charvols =

Arboretum in Haute-Loire, Auvergne, France

Coordinates: 45.35369°N 3.71708°E

The Arboretum de Charvols, of approximately hectare extent, also called the Arboretum du Plateau de La Chaise-Dieu, is an arboretum located in Malvières, Haute-Loire, Auvergne, France. It is open daily without charge.

The arboretum was established in 1993 on a former agricultural clearing in the middle of the forest of La Chaise-Dieu, at an altitude of approximately 900 meters, with a primary mission of timber trials for enrichment of the forest. It consists of almost 100 plots with collections containing 97 species (34 conifers, 38 hardwoods, 25 shrubs and fruit).

== See also ==
- List of botanical gardens in France
