= La Chapelle-Geneste =

- Commune
- Location of La Chapelle-Geneste
- Location within France Location within Auvergne-Rhône-Alpes
- Coordinates: 45°21′02″N 3°40′06″E
- Country: France
- Region: Auvergne-Rhône-Alpes
- Department: Haute-Loire
- Arrondissement: Brioude
- Canton: Plateau du Haut-Velay granitique
- Intercommunality: CA du Puy-en-Velay

Government
  - Mayor (2020–2026): Christine Noton
- Area^{1}: 18.06 km^{2} (6.97 sq mi)
- Elevation: 1,004 m (3,294 ft)
- Highest elevation: 1,114 m (3,655 ft)
- Lowest elevation: 668 m (2,192 ft)
- Population (2023): 110
  - Density: 6.1/km^{2} (16/sq mi)
- Time zone: UTC+01:00 (CET)
  - Summer (DST): UTC+02:00 (CEST)
- INSEE/Postal code: 43059 /43160
- ^{1} French Land Register data, which excludes lakes, ponds, glaciers > 1 km^{2} (0.386 sq mi or 247 acres) and river estuaries.

La Chapelle-Geneste (French pronunciation: [la ʃapɛl ʒənɛst]; Occitan: La Chapèla Genesta) is a commune in the Haute-Loire department in south-central France.

== Geography ==
The Senouire flows west, then south, through the southwestern part of the commune.

== Population ==
Historical population
Year	Pop.	±% p.a.
1968	247	—
1975	180	−4.42%
1982	151	−2.48%
1990	139	−1.03%
1999	141	+0.16%
2007	140	−0.09%
2012	129	−1.62%
2017	110	−3.14%
2023	110	+0.00%
Source: INSEE

== See also ==
- Communes of the Haute-Loire department
