= Paulhaguet =

- Commune
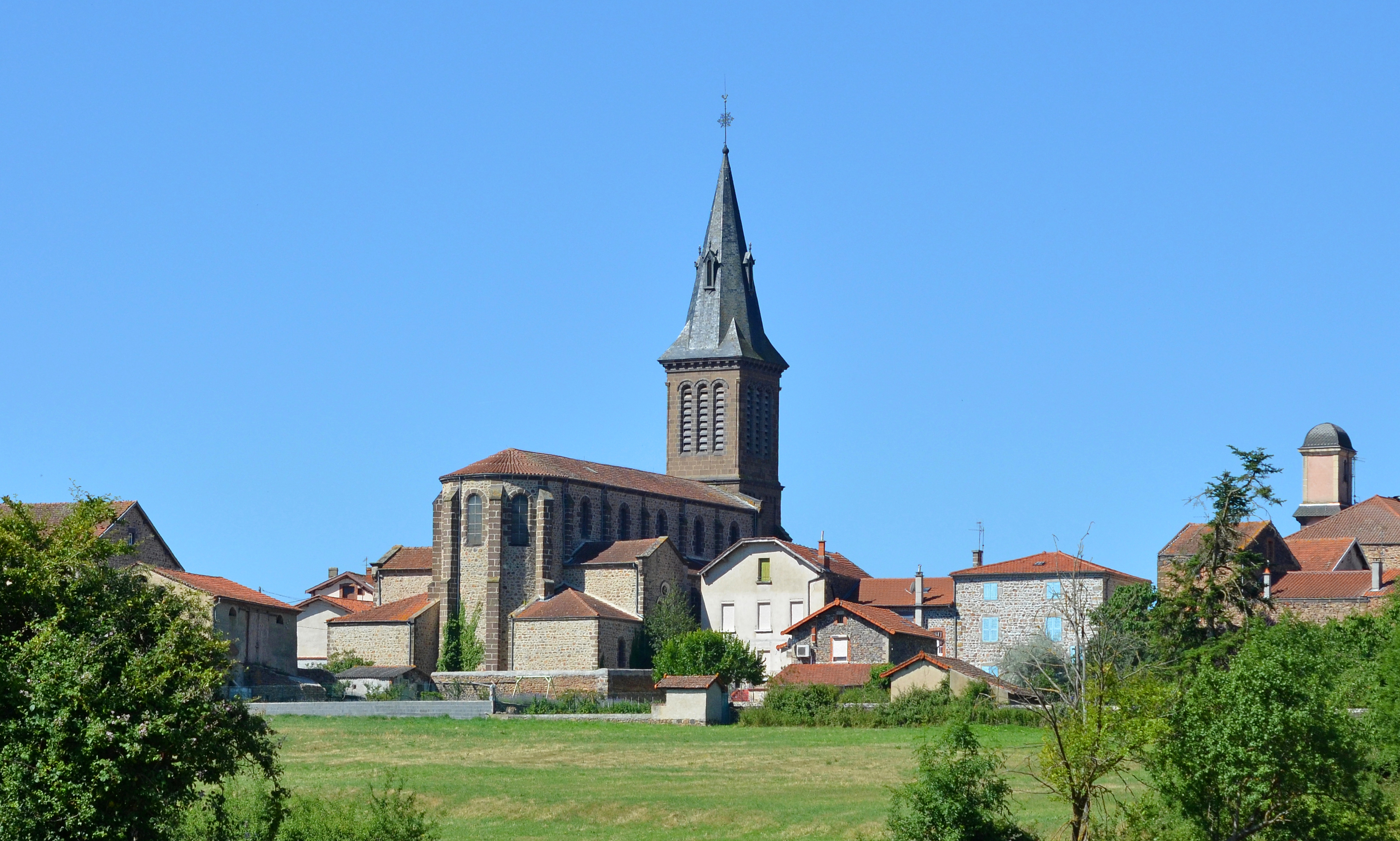
- The church and surrounding buildings in Paulhaguet

- Coat of arms
- Location of Paulhaguet
- Location within France Location within Auvergne-Rhône-Alpes
- Coordinates: 45°12′32″N 3°30′51″E
- Country: France
- Region: Auvergne-Rhône-Alpes
- Department: Haute-Loire
- Arrondissement: Brioude
- Canton: Pays de Lafayette

Government
  - Mayor (2020–2026): Gérard Belin
- Area^{1}: 11.23 km^{2} (4.34 sq mi)
- Elevation: 530 m (1,740 ft)
- Highest elevation: 689 m (2,260 ft)
- Lowest elevation: 494 m (1,621 ft)
- Population (2023): 853
  - Density: 76.0/km^{2} (197/sq mi)
- Time zone: UTC+01:00 (CET)
  - Summer (DST): UTC+02:00 (CEST)
- INSEE/Postal code: 43148 /43230
- ^{1} French Land Register data, which excludes lakes, ponds, glaciers > 1 km^{2} (0.386 sq mi or 247 acres) and river estuaries.

Paulhaguet (French pronunciation: [polaɡɛ]) is a commune in the Haute-Loire department in south-central France.

== Geography ==
The Senouire flows northwest through the southern part of the commune, crosses the town, then flows north through the commune.

== Population ==
Historical population
| Year | Pop. | ±% p.a. |
|---|---|---|
| 1968 | 1,203 | — |
| 1975 | 1,054 | −1.87% |
| 1982 | 996 | −0.81% |
| 1990 | 921 | −0.97% |
| 1999 | 981 | +0.70% |
| 2007 | 982 | +0.01% |
| 2012 | 916 | −1.38% |
| 2017 | 876 | −0.89% |
| 2023 | 853 | −0.44% |
Source: INSEE

== Popular culture ==
Certain scenes from the 1995 romantic comedy "French Kiss", starring Meg Ryan and Kevin Kline, were filmed there, as well as in nearby La Ravelle.

== See also ==
- Communes of the Haute-Loire department
