= Mazerat-Aurouze =

- Commune
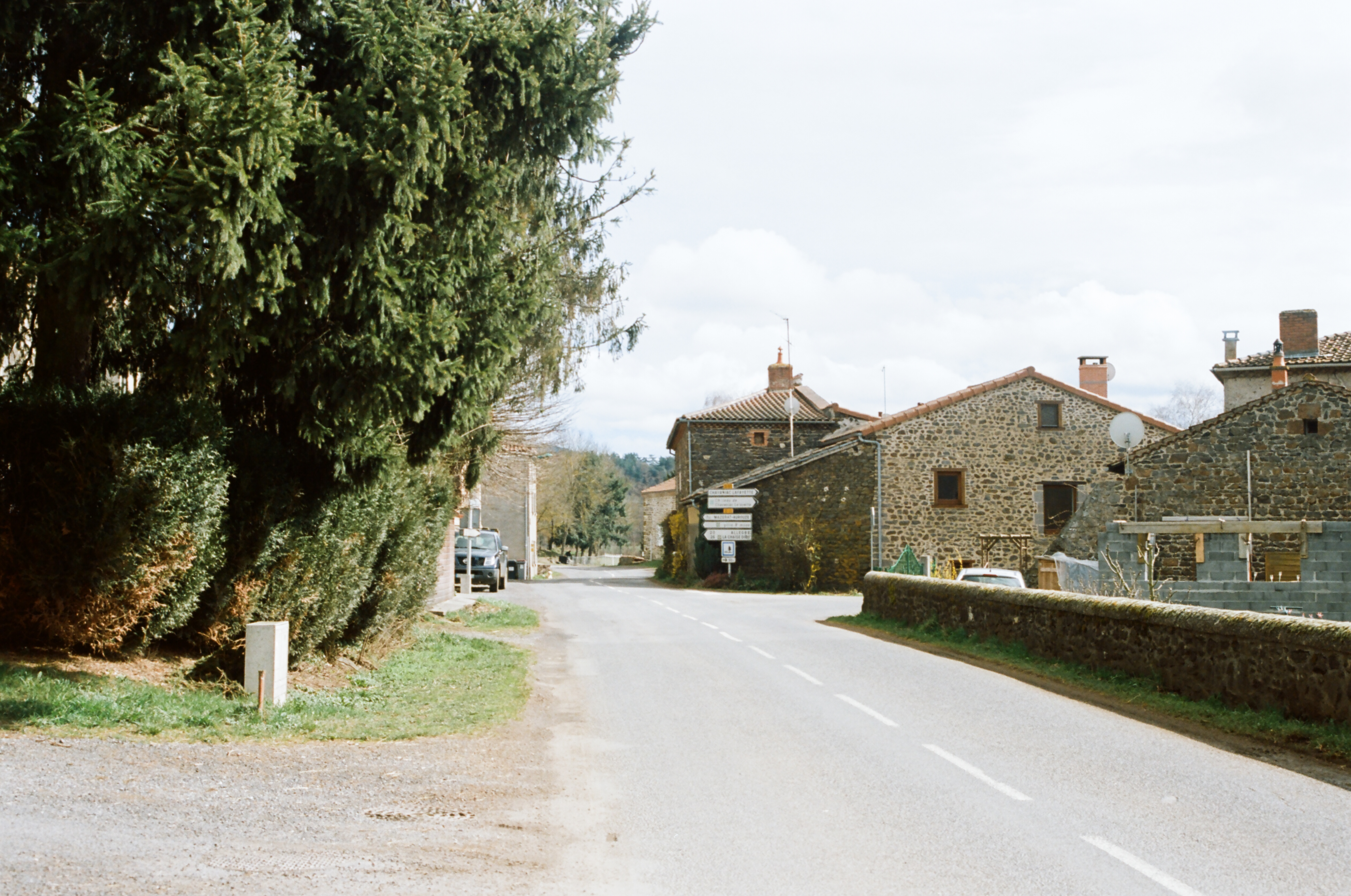
- Location of Mazerat-Aurouze
- Location within France Location within Auvergne-Rhône-Alpes
- Coordinates: 45°11′14″N 3°33′40″E
- Country: France
- Region: Auvergne-Rhône-Alpes
- Department: Haute-Loire
- Arrondissement: Brioude
- Canton: Pays de Lafayette

Government
  - Mayor (2021–2026): Lydie Bertoni
- Area^{1}: 16.35 km^{2} (6.31 sq mi)
- Elevation: 600 m (2,000 ft)
- Highest elevation: 968 m (3,176 ft)
- Lowest elevation: 534 m (1,752 ft)
- Population (2023): 187
  - Density: 11.4/km^{2} (29.6/sq mi)
- Time zone: UTC+01:00 (CET)
  - Summer (DST): UTC+02:00 (CEST)
- INSEE/Postal code: 43131 /43230
- ^{1} French Land Register data, which excludes lakes, ponds, glaciers > 1 km^{2} (0.386 sq mi or 247 acres) and river estuaries.

Mazerat-Aurouze (French pronunciation: [mazʁa oʁuz]; Occitan: Maserat d'Aurosa, before 1996: Mazeyrat-Aurouze) is a commune in the Haute-Loire department in south-central France.

== Geography ==
The Senouire flows southwest, then northwest, through the commune; most of the hamlets lie in its valley.

== Population ==
Historical population
Year	Pop.	±% p.a.
1968	269	—
1975	232	−2.09%
1982	215	−1.08%
1990	215	+0.00%
1999	198	−0.91%
2007	191	−0.45%
2012	214	+2.30%
2017	200	−1.34%
2023	187	−1.11%
Source: INSEE

== See also ==
- Communes of the Haute-Loire department
