= Salzuit =

- Commune
- Location of Salzuit
- Location within France Location within Auvergne-Rhône-Alpes
- Coordinates: 45°12′39″N 3°29′03″E
- Country: France
- Region: Auvergne-Rhône-Alpes
- Department: Haute-Loire
- Arrondissement: Brioude
- Canton: Pays de Lafayette

Government
  - Mayor (2020–2026): Pascale Noel
- Area^{1}: 8.05 km^{2} (3.11 sq mi)
- Elevation: 600 m (2,000 ft)
- Highest elevation: 768 m (2,520 ft)
- Lowest elevation: 514 m (1,686 ft)
- Population (2023): 330
  - Density: 41/km^{2} (110/sq mi)
- Time zone: UTC+01:00 (CET)
  - Summer (DST): UTC+02:00 (CEST)
- INSEE/Postal code: 43232 /43230
- ^{1} French Land Register data, which excludes lakes, ponds, glaciers > 1 km^{2} (0.386 sq mi or 247 acres) and river estuaries.

Salzuit (French pronunciation: [salzɥi]) is a commune in the Haute-Loire department in south-central France.

== Geography ==
The Senouire forms part of the commune's eastern border.

== Population ==
Historical population
Year	Pop.	±% p.a.
1968	296	—
1975	301	+0.24%
1982	331	+1.37%
1990	354	+0.84%
1999	341	−0.41%
2007	354	+0.47%
2012	359	+0.28%
2017	362	+0.17%
2023	330	−1.53%
Source: INSEE

== See also ==
- Communes of the Haute-Loire department
