= Bournoncle-Saint-Pierre =

- Commune
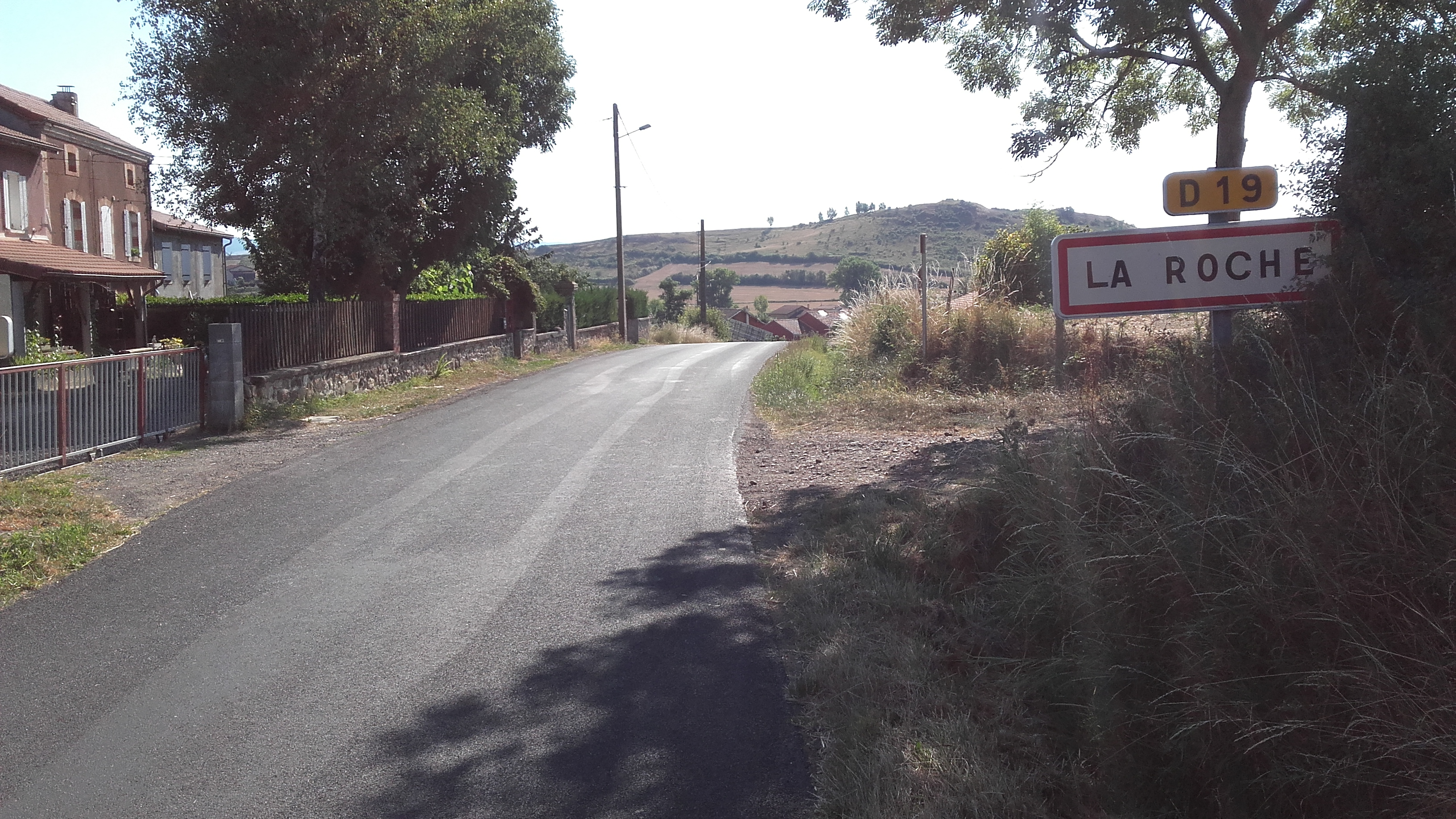
- Location of Bournoncle-Saint-Pierre
- Location within France Location within Auvergne-Rhône-Alpes
- Coordinates: 45°20′40″N 3°19′09″E
- Country: France
- Region: Auvergne-Rhône-Alpes
- Department: Haute-Loire
- Arrondissement: Brioude
- Canton: Brioude

Government
  - Mayor (2020–2026): Marie-Christine Egly née Biscarrat
- Area^{1}: 16.16 km^{2} (6.24 sq mi)
- Elevation: 490 m (1,610 ft)
- Highest elevation: 614 m (2,014 ft)
- Lowest elevation: 419 m (1,375 ft)
- Population (2023): 1,075
  - Density: 66.52/km^{2} (172.3/sq mi)
- Time zone: UTC+01:00 (CET)
  - Summer (DST): UTC+02:00 (CEST)
- INSEE/Postal code: 43038 /43360
- ^{1} French Land Register data, which excludes lakes, ponds, glaciers > 1 km^{2} (0.386 sq mi or 247 acres) and river estuaries.

Bournoncle-Saint-Pierre (French pronunciation: [buʁnɔ̃kl sɛ̃ pjɛʁ]; Occitan: Bornoncle) is a commune in the Haute-Loire department in south-central France.

== Population ==
Historical population
Year	Pop.	±% p.a.
1968	1,142	—
1975	1,101	−0.52%
1982	1,049	−0.69%
1990	994	−0.67%
1999	954	−0.46%
2007	1,004	+0.64%
2012	1,007	+0.06%
2017	991	−0.32%
2023	1,075	+1.37%
Source: INSEE

== See also ==
- Communes of the Haute-Loire department
