= Lamothe, Haute-Loire =

Lamothe
- Commune
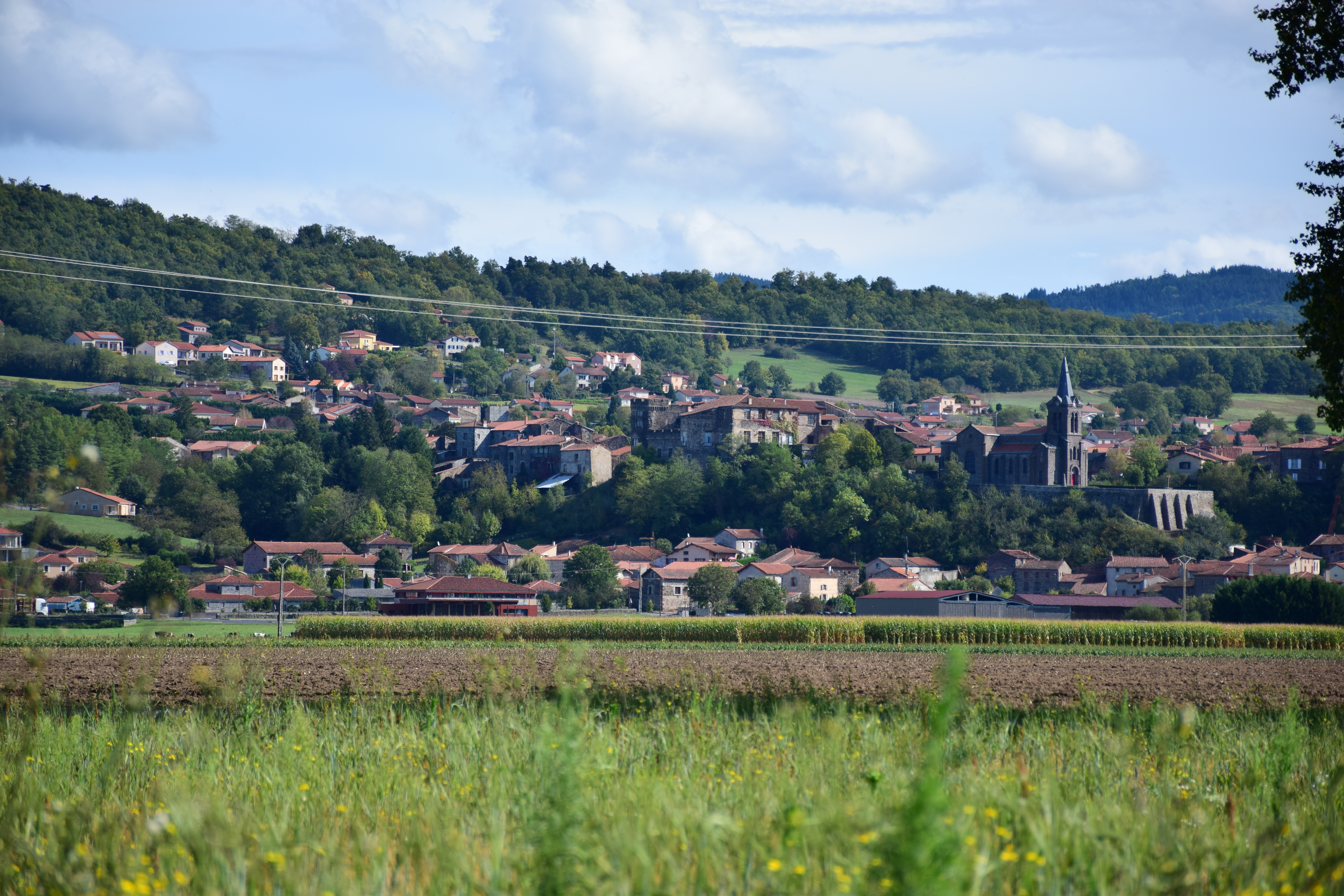
- Location of Lamothe
- Location within France Location within Auvergne-Rhône-Alpes
- Coordinates: 45°18′50″N 3°25′31″E
- Country: France
- Region: Auvergne-Rhône-Alpes
- Department: Haute-Loire
- Arrondissement: Brioude
- Canton: Brioude

Government
  - Mayor (2020–2026): Alain Jarlier
- Area^{1}: 12.24 km^{2} (4.73 sq mi)
- Elevation: 435 m (1,427 ft)
- Highest elevation: 645 m (2,116 ft)
- Lowest elevation: 417 m (1,368 ft)
- Population (2023): 819
  - Density: 66.9/km^{2} (173/sq mi)
- Time zone: UTC+01:00 (CET)
  - Summer (DST): UTC+02:00 (CEST)
- INSEE/Postal code: 43110 /43100
- ^{1} French Land Register data, which excludes lakes, ponds, glaciers > 1 km^{2} (0.386 sq mi or 247 acres) and river estuaries.

Lamothe (French pronunciation: [lamɔt]; Occitan: La Mòta) is a commune in the Haute-Loire department in south-central France.

== Population ==
Historical population
| Year | Pop. | ±% p.a. |
|---|---|---|
| 1968 | 507 | — |
| 1975 | 532 | +0.69% |
| 1982 | 607 | +1.90% |
| 1990 | 627 | +0.41% |
| 1999 | 715 | +1.47% |
| 2007 | 869 | +2.47% |
| 2012 | 841 | −0.65% |
| 2017 | 859 | +0.42% |
| 2023 | 819 | −0.79% |
Source: INSEE

== See also ==
- Communes of the Haute-Loire department
