= Fontannes =

- Commune
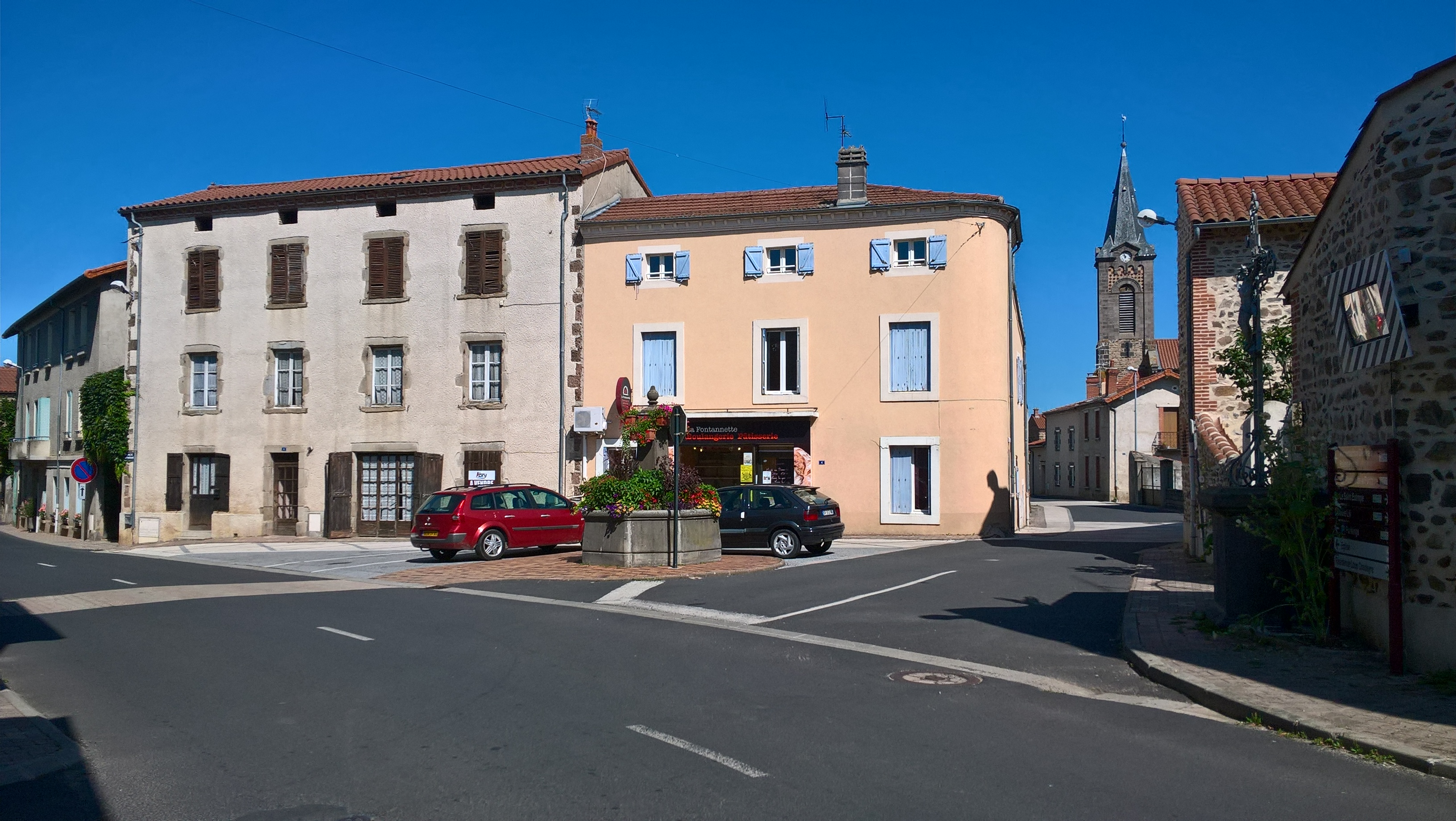

- Coat of arms
- Location of Fontannes
- Location within France Location within Auvergne-Rhône-Alpes
- Coordinates: 45°17′24″N 3°25′32″E
- Country: France
- Region: Auvergne-Rhône-Alpes
- Department: Haute-Loire
- Arrondissement: Brioude
- Canton: Brioude

Government
  - Mayor (2020–2026): René Marchaud
- Area^{1}: 9.77 km^{2} (3.77 sq mi)
- Elevation: 425 m (1,394 ft)
- Highest elevation: 527 m (1,729 ft)
- Lowest elevation: 419 m (1,375 ft)
- Population (2023): 875
  - Density: 89.6/km^{2} (232/sq mi)
- Time zone: UTC+01:00 (CET)
  - Summer (DST): UTC+02:00 (CEST)
- INSEE/Postal code: 43096 /43100
- ^{1} French Land Register data, which excludes lakes, ponds, glaciers > 1 km^{2} (0.386 sq mi or 247 acres) and river estuaries.

Fontannes (French pronunciation: [fɔ̃tan]; Occitan: Fontannes) is a commune in the Haute-Loire department in south-central France.

== Geography ==
The Senouire forms part of the commune's southern border, then flows into the Allier, which forms its western border.

== Population ==
Historical population
Year	Pop.	±% p.a.
1968	483	—
1975	538	+1.55%
1982	665	+3.07%
1990	774	+1.92%
1999	873	+1.35%
2007	1,119	+3.15%
2012	1,065	−0.98%
2017	952	−2.22%
2023	875	−1.40%
Source: INSEE

== See also ==
- Communes of the Haute-Loire department
