= Lavaudieu =

- Commune
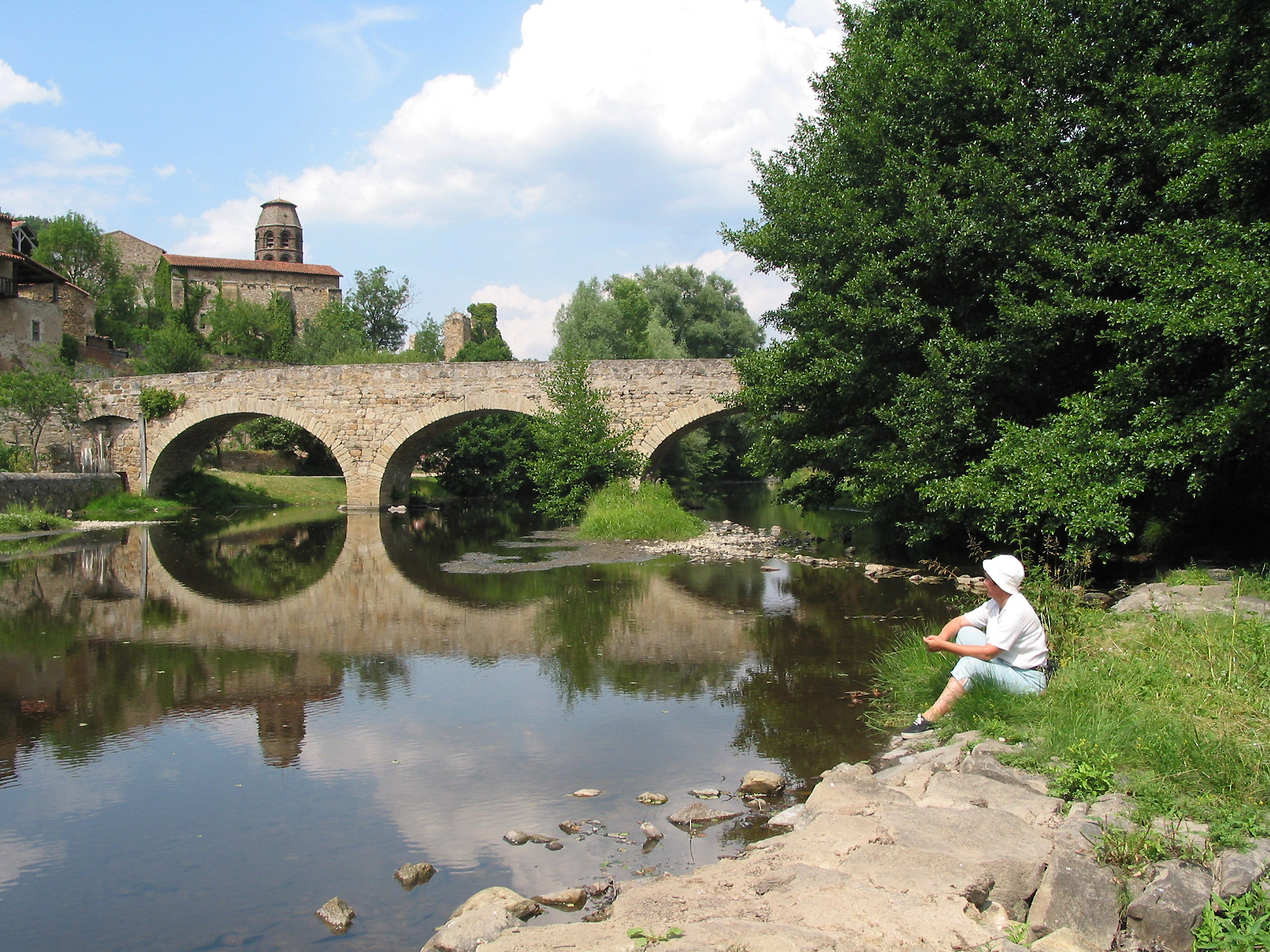
- Bridge on the Senouire River and St. André abbey.

- Coat of arms
- Location of Lavaudieu
- Location within France Location within Auvergne-Rhône-Alpes
- Coordinates: 45°15′49″N 3°27′17″E
- Country: France
- Region: Auvergne-Rhône-Alpes
- Department: Haute-Loire
- Arrondissement: Brioude
- Canton: Brioude

Government
  - Mayor (2023–2026): Pascal Piroux
- Area^{1}: 17.54 km^{2} (6.77 sq mi)
- Elevation: 550 m (1,800 ft)
- Highest elevation: 727 m (2,385 ft)
- Lowest elevation: 438 m (1,437 ft)
- Population (2023): 243
  - Density: 13.9/km^{2} (35.9/sq mi)
- Time zone: UTC+01:00 (CET)
  - Summer (DST): UTC+02:00 (CEST)
- INSEE/Postal code: 43117 /43100
- ^{1} French Land Register data, which excludes lakes, ponds, glaciers > 1 km^{2} (0.386 sq mi or 247 acres) and river estuaries.

Lavaudieu (French pronunciation: [lavodjø]) is a commune in the Haute-Loire department in south-central France. It is a member of Les Plus Beaux Villages de France (The Most Beautiful Villages of France) Association.

== Geography ==
The village lies on the right bank of the Senouire, which flows west through the commune.

== Population ==
Historical population
Year	Pop.	±% p.a.
1968	242	—
1975	229	−0.79%
1982	237	+0.49%
1990	238	+0.05%
1999	225	−0.62%
2007	227	+0.11%
2012	228	+0.09%
2017	243	+1.28%
2023	243	+0.00%
Source: INSEE

== Sights ==
- Romanesque Lavaudieu Abbey, long known as Lavaudieu Priory (Abbaye Saint-André de Lavaudieu), was established by Robert de Turlande, the first abbot of the nearby Abbey of La Chaise-Dieu, in the 11th century. It was founded as a Benedictine community of nuns but later became a house of secular canonesses (i.e., pious women living in community but not taking religious vows) from the Auvergnat nobility. It was raised to the status of abbey in 1719.

== See also ==
- Communes of the Haute-Loire department
