= Sainte-Marguerite, Haute-Loire =

Sainte-Marguerite
- Commune
- Location of Sainte-Marguerite
- Location within France Location within Auvergne-Rhône-Alpes
- Coordinates: 45°12′26″N 3°35′32″E
- Country: France
- Region: Auvergne-Rhône-Alpes
- Department: Haute-Loire
- Arrondissement: Brioude
- Canton: Pays de Lafayette

Government
  - Mayor (2020–2026): Jean-Jacques Ludon
- Area^{1}: 5.39 km^{2} (2.08 sq mi)
- Elevation: 626 m (2,054 ft)
- Highest elevation: 889 m (2,917 ft)
- Lowest elevation: 590 m (1,940 ft)
- Population (2023): 36
  - Density: 6.7/km^{2} (17/sq mi)
- Time zone: UTC+01:00 (CET)
  - Summer (DST): UTC+02:00 (CEST)
- INSEE/Postal code: 43208 /43230
- ^{1} French Land Register data, which excludes lakes, ponds, glaciers > 1 km^{2} (0.386 sq mi or 247 acres) and river estuaries.

Sainte-Marguerite (French pronunciation: [sɛ̃t maʁɡərit]; Auvergnat: Senta Margarida) is a commune in the Haute-Loire department and the Auvergne region of south-central France.

== Geography ==
Sainte-Marguerite is located in the Parc naturel régional Livradois-Forez.

The Senouire flows southwest through the southeastern part of the commune.

The commune contains several hamlets, including Le Rif, La Vizade and Charbonnières.

== Population ==
Historical population
Year	Pop.	±% p.a.
1968	65	—
1975	48	−4.24%
1982	42	−1.89%
1990	38	−1.24%
1999	37	−0.30%
2007	31	−2.19%
2012	39	+4.70%
2017	43	+1.97%
2023	36	−2.92%
Source: INSEE

== See also ==
- Communes of the Haute-Loire department
