= Girona region =

Girona region may refer to:

- Comarques Gironines, a vegueria in northeast Catalonia
- Gironès, a comarca northeast of Catalonia
- Province of Girona, a Spanish province in Catalonia

== See also ==
- Girona (disambiguation)
