= La Chapelle-Bertin =

- Commune
- Coat of arms
- Location of La Chapelle-Bertin
- Location within France Location within Auvergne-Rhône-Alpes
- Coordinates: 45°13′51″N 3°38′57″E
- Country: France
- Region: Auvergne-Rhône-Alpes
- Department: Haute-Loire
- Arrondissement: Le Puy-en-Velay
- Canton: Plateau du Haut-Velay granitique
- Intercommunality: CA du Puy-en-Velay

Government
  - Mayor (2020–2026): Paul Maury
- Area^{1}: 11.29 km^{2} (4.36 sq mi)
- Elevation: 1,100 m (3,600 ft)
- Highest elevation: 1,136 m (3,727 ft)
- Lowest elevation: 680 m (2,230 ft)
- Population (2023): 50
  - Density: 4.4/km^{2} (11/sq mi)
- Time zone: UTC+01:00 (CET)
  - Summer (DST): UTC+02:00 (CEST)
- INSEE/Postal code: 43057 /43270
- ^{1} French Land Register data, which excludes lakes, ponds, glaciers > 1 km^{2} (0.386 sq mi or 247 acres) and river estuaries.

La Chapelle-Bertin (French pronunciation: [la ʃapɛl bɛʁtɛ̃]; Occitan: La Chapèla Bertin) is a commune in the Haute-Loire department in south-central France.

== Geography ==
The Senouire forms most of the commune's northwestern border.

== Population ==
Historical population
Year	Pop.	±% p.a.
1968	140	—
1975	104	−4.16%
1982	84	−3.00%
1990	88	+0.58%
1999	72	−2.21%
2007	62	−1.85%
2012	57	−1.67%
2017	48	−3.38%
2023	50	+0.68%
Source: INSEE

== See also ==
- Communes of the Haute-Loire department
