= Sembadel =

- Commune
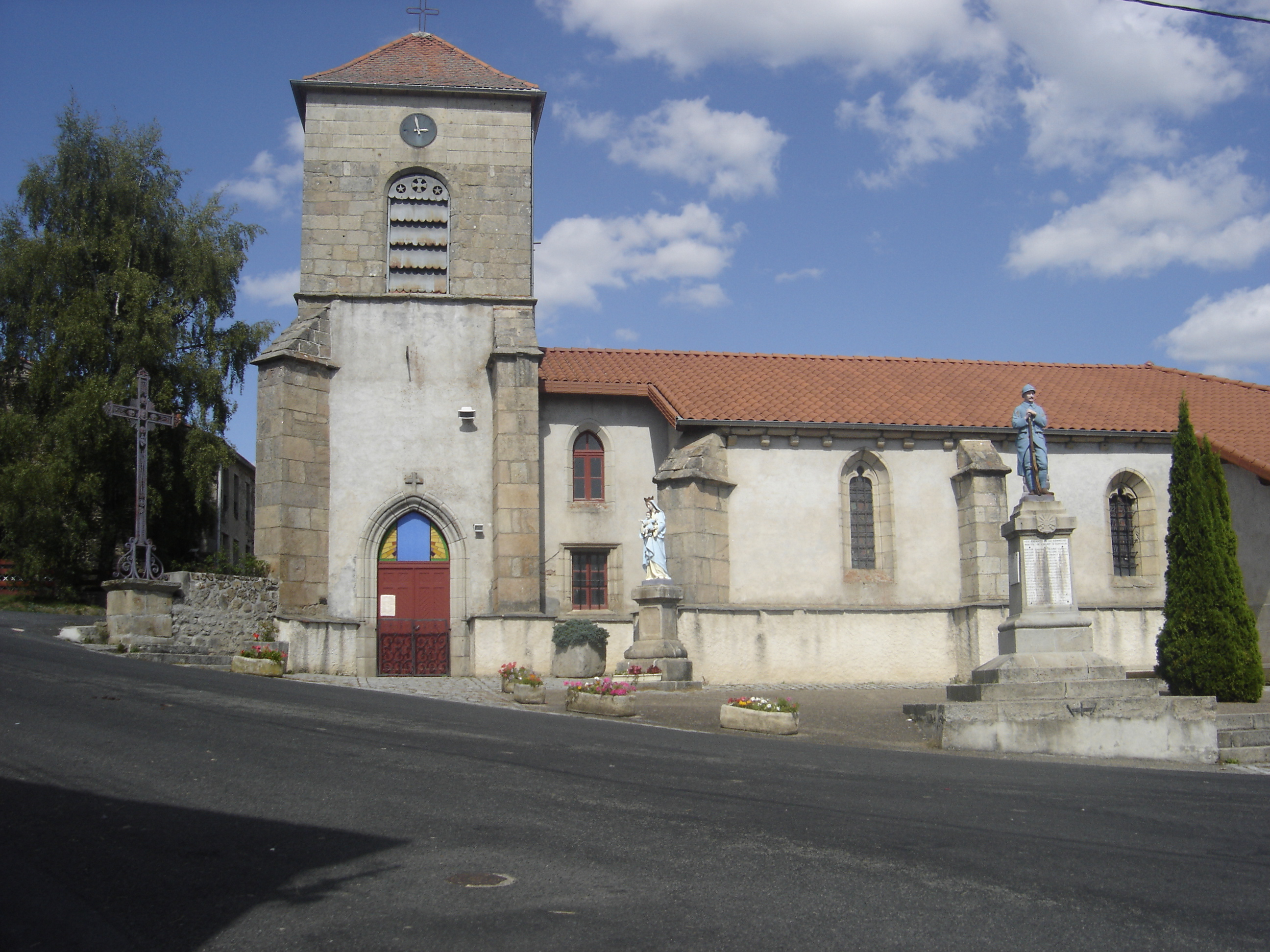
- Location of Sembadel
- Location within France Location within Auvergne-Rhône-Alpes
- Coordinates: 45°16′32″N 3°41′15″E
- Country: France
- Region: Auvergne-Rhône-Alpes
- Department: Haute-Loire
- Arrondissement: Brioude
- Canton: Plateau du Haut-Velay granitique
- Intercommunality: CA du Puy-en-Velay

Government
  - Mayor (2020–2026): Roland Gobet
- Area^{1}: 18.59 km^{2} (7.18 sq mi)
- Highest elevation: 1,128 m (3,701 ft)
- Lowest elevation: 849 m (2,785 ft)
- Population (2023): 247
  - Density: 13.3/km^{2} (34.4/sq mi)
- Time zone: UTC+01:00 (CET)
  - Summer (DST): UTC+02:00 (CEST)
- INSEE/Postal code: 43237 /43160
- ^{1} French Land Register data, which excludes lakes, ponds, glaciers > 1 km^{2} (0.386 sq mi or 247 acres) and river estuaries.

Sembadel (French pronunciation: [sɑ̃badɛl]; Auvergnat: Sant Badèu) is a commune in the Haute-Loire department in south-central France.

== Geography ==
The Senouire has its source in the commune.

== Population ==
Historical population
Year	Pop.	±% p.a.
1968	422	—
1975	328	−3.54%
1982	263	−3.11%
1990	238	−1.24%
1999	250	+0.55%
2007	250	+0.00%
2012	239	−0.90%
2017	229	−0.85%
2023	247	+1.27%
Source: INSEE

== See also ==
- Communes of the Haute-Loire department
