= Canton of Brioude =

Coordinates: 45.29°N 3.38°E

The canton of Brioude is an administrative division of the Haute-Loire department, south-central France. It was created at the French canton reorganisation which came into effect in March 2015. Its seat is in Brioude.

It consists of the following communes:

1. Beaumont
2. Bournoncle-Saint-Pierre
3. Brioude
4. Chaniat
5. Cohade
6. Fontannes
7. Lamothe
8. Lavaudieu
9. Paulhac
10. Saint-Géron
11. Saint-Laurent-Chabreuges
12. Vieille-Brioude
