= Saint-Pal-de-Senouire =

- Commune
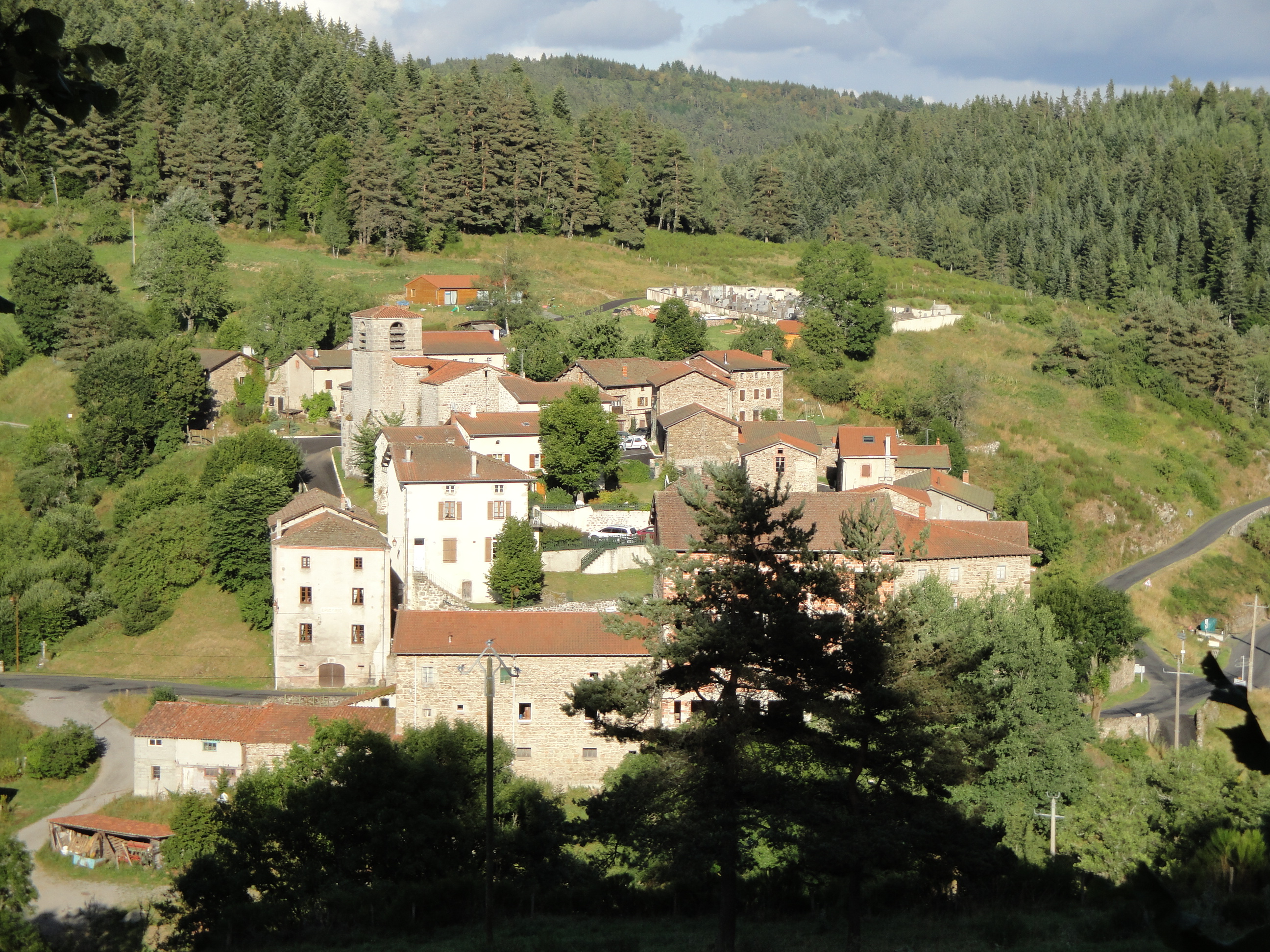

- Coat of arms
- Location of Saint-Pal-de-Senouire
- Location within France Location within Auvergne-Rhône-Alpes
- Coordinates: 45°15′36″N 3°39′05″E
- Country: France
- Region: Auvergne-Rhône-Alpes
- Department: Haute-Loire
- Arrondissement: Brioude
- Canton: Plateau du Haut-Velay granitique

Government
  - Mayor (2020–2026): Alain Fouillit
- Area^{1}: 18.35 km^{2} (7.08 sq mi)
- Elevation: 840 m (2,760 ft)
- Highest elevation: 1,204 m (3,950 ft)
- Lowest elevation: 789 m (2,589 ft)
- Population (2023): 108
  - Density: 5.89/km^{2} (15.2/sq mi)
- Time zone: UTC+01:00 (CET)
  - Summer (DST): UTC+02:00 (CEST)
- INSEE/Postal code: 43214 /43160
- ^{1} French Land Register data, which excludes lakes, ponds, glaciers > 1 km^{2} (0.386 sq mi or 247 acres) and river estuaries.

Saint-Pal-de-Senouire (French pronunciation: [sɛ̃ pal də sənwiʁ], literally Saint-Pal of Senouire; Occitan: Sent Pal de Senoira) is a commune in the Haute-Loire department in south-central France.

== Geography ==
The Senouire flows south through the middle of the commune.

== Population ==
Historical population
Year	Pop.	±% p.a.
1968	268	—
1975	217	−2.97%
1982	174	−3.11%
1990	143	−2.42%
1999	118	−2.11%
2007	95	−2.67%
2012	106	+2.22%
2017	109	+0.56%
2023	108	−0.15%
Source: INSEE

== See also ==
- Communes of the Haute-Loire department
