= Bonneval, Haute-Loire =

Bonneval
- Commune
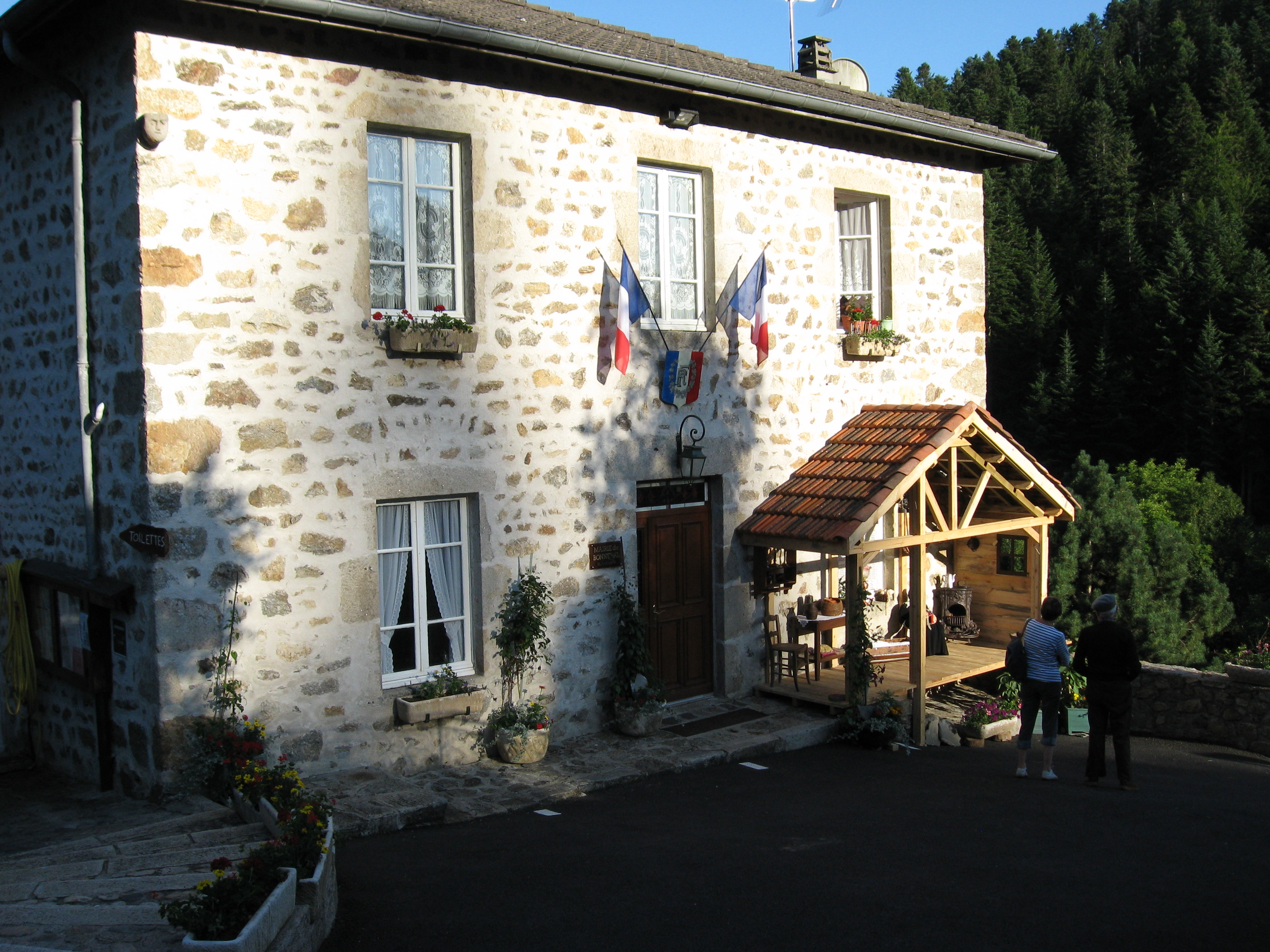
- Town hall

- Coat of arms
- Location of Bonneval
- Location within France Location within Auvergne-Rhône-Alpes
- Coordinates: 45°18′45″N 3°44′32″E
- Country: France
- Region: Auvergne-Rhône-Alpes
- Department: Haute-Loire
- Arrondissement: Brioude
- Canton: Plateau du Haut-Velay granitique
- Intercommunality: CA du Puy-en-Velay

Government
  - Mayor (2020–2026): Paul Bard
- Area^{1}: 14.66 km^{2} (5.66 sq mi)
- Highest elevation: 1,126 m (3,694 ft)
- Lowest elevation: 740 m (2,430 ft)
- Population (2023): 92
  - Density: 6.3/km^{2} (16/sq mi)
- Time zone: UTC+01:00 (CET)
  - Summer (DST): UTC+02:00 (CEST)
- INSEE/Postal code: 43035 /43160
- ^{1} French Land Register data, which excludes lakes, ponds, glaciers > 1 km^{2} (0.386 sq mi or 247 acres) and river estuaries.

Bonneval (French pronunciation: [bɔnval]) is a commune in the Haute-Loire department in south-central France.

== Geography ==
The Senouire forms most of the commune's western border.

== Population ==
Historical population
Year	Pop.	±% p.a.
1968	123	—
1975	124	+0.12%
1982	122	−0.23%
1990	109	−1.40%
1999	105	−0.41%
2007	95	−1.24%
2012	80	−3.38%
2017	70	−2.64%
2023	92	+4.66%
Source: INSEE

== See also ==
- Communes of the Haute-Loire department
