= Cohade =

- Commune
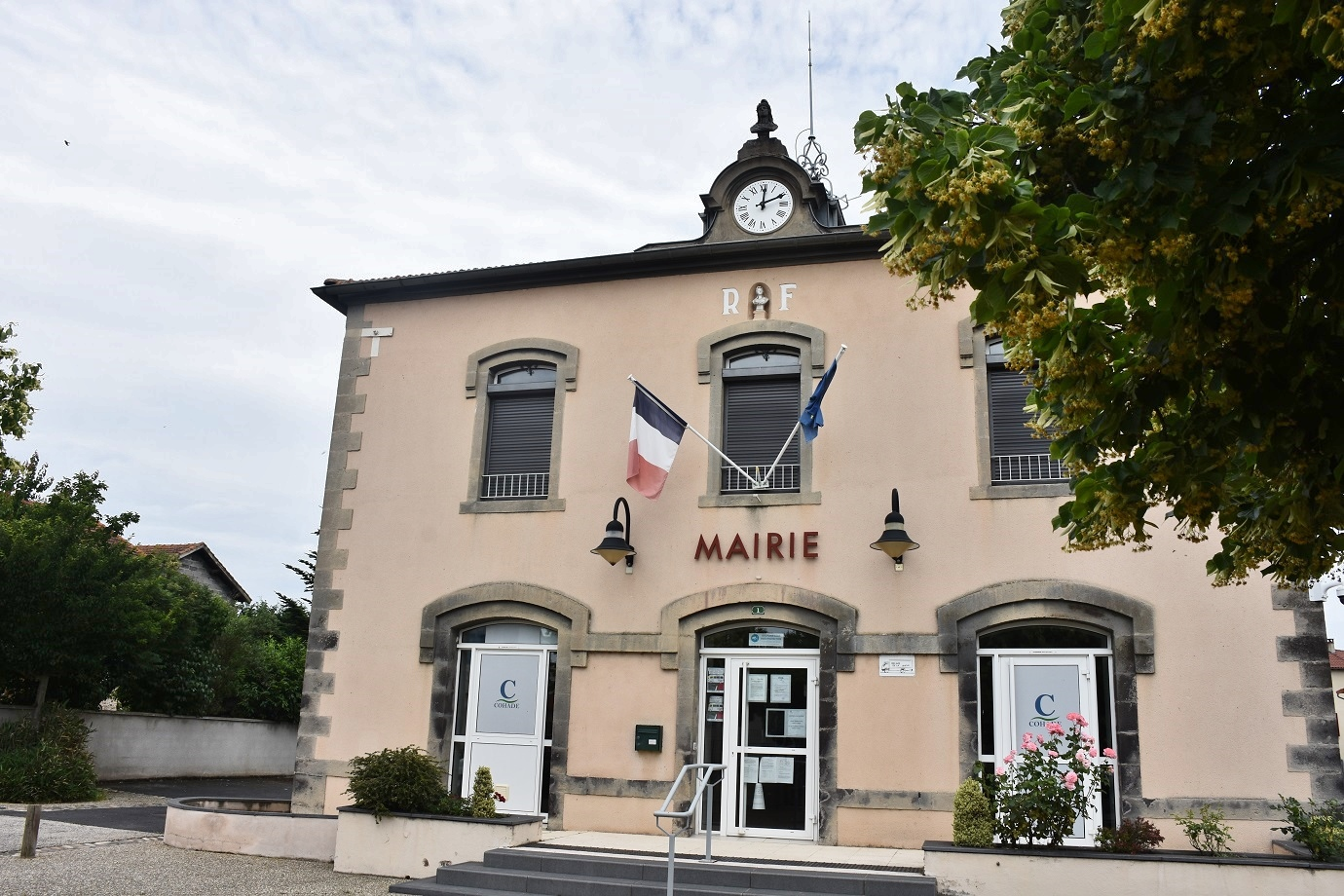
- Cohade Town hall
- Location of Cohade
- Location within France Location within Auvergne-Rhône-Alpes
- Coordinates: 45°20′18″N 3°22′28″E
- Country: France
- Region: Auvergne-Rhône-Alpes
- Department: Haute-Loire
- Arrondissement: Brioude
- Canton: Brioude

Government
  - Mayor (2020–2026): Philippe Faidit
- Area^{1}: 9.99 km^{2} (3.86 sq mi)
- Elevation: 406 m (1,332 ft)
- Highest elevation: 459 m (1,506 ft)
- Lowest elevation: 405 m (1,329 ft)
- Population (2023): 893
  - Density: 89.4/km^{2} (232/sq mi)
- Time zone: UTC+01:00 (CET)
  - Summer (DST): UTC+02:00 (CEST)
- INSEE/Postal code: 43074 /43100
- ^{1} French Land Register data, which excludes lakes, ponds, glaciers > 1 km^{2} (0.386 sq mi or 247 acres) and river estuaries.

Cohade (French pronunciation: [kɔad]) is a commune in the Haute-Loire department in south-central France.

== Population ==
Historical population
Year	Pop.	±% p.a.
1968	381	—
1975	400	+0.70%
1982	518	+3.76%
1990	591	+1.66%
1999	653	+1.11%
2007	767	+2.03%
2012	826	+1.49%
2017	863	+0.88%
2023	893	+0.57%
Source: INSEE

== See also ==
- Communes of the Haute-Loire department
