= Malvières =

- Commune
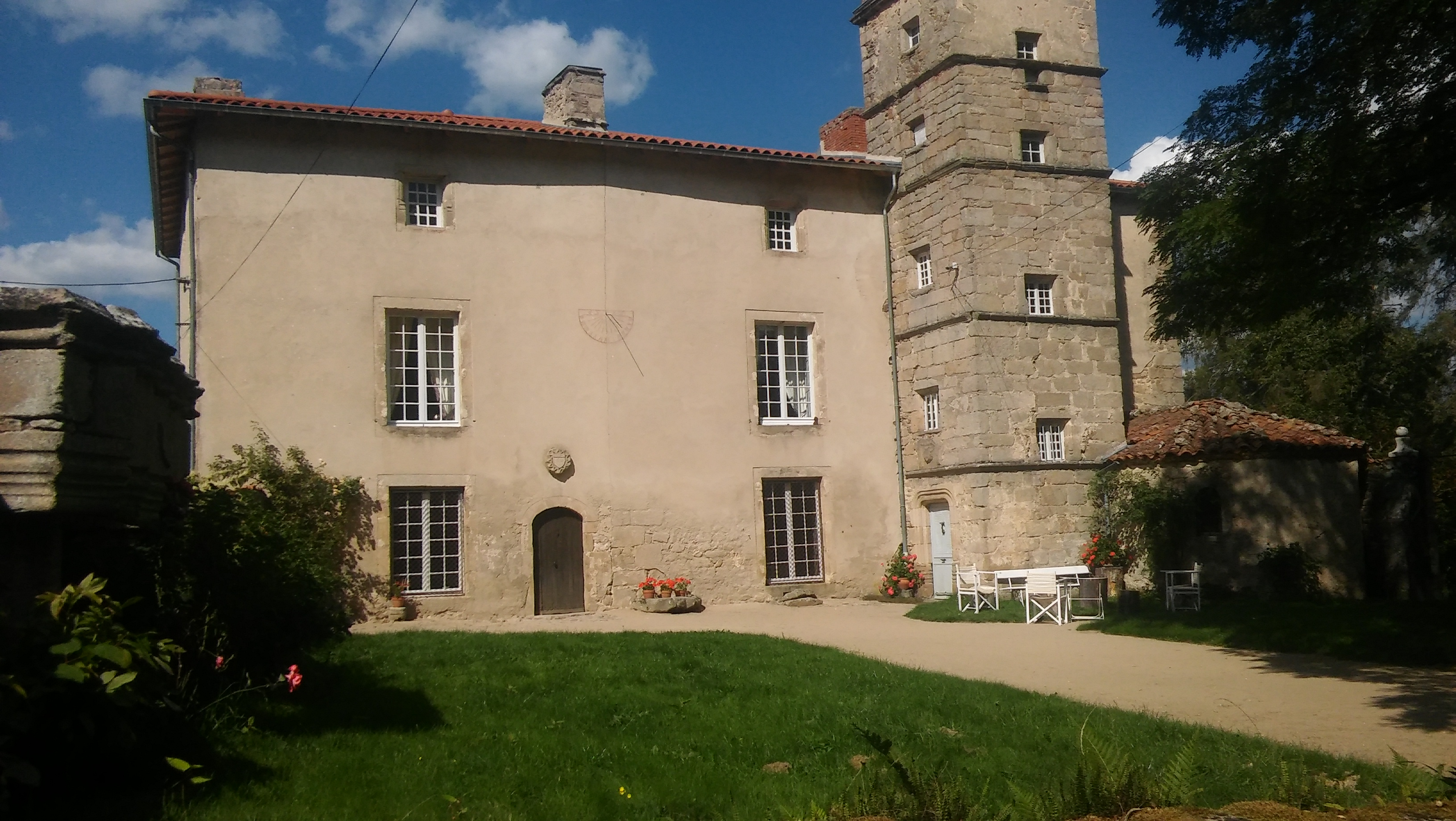
- Château de Folgoux
- Location of Malvières
- Location within France Location within Auvergne-Rhône-Alpes
- Coordinates: 45°20′18″N 3°43′59″E
- Country: France
- Region: Auvergne-Rhône-Alpes
- Department: Haute-Loire
- Arrondissement: Brioude
- Canton: Plateau du Haut-Velay granitique
- Intercommunality: CA du Puy-en-Velay

Government
  - Mayor (2020–2026): Jean-Claude Bonnebouche
- Area^{1}: 13.72 km^{2} (5.30 sq mi)
- Elevation: 935 m (3,068 ft)
- Highest elevation: 1,074 m (3,524 ft)
- Lowest elevation: 668 m (2,192 ft)
- Population (2023): 144
  - Density: 10.5/km^{2} (27.2/sq mi)
- Time zone: UTC+01:00 (CET)
  - Summer (DST): UTC+02:00 (CEST)
- INSEE/Postal code: 43128 /43160
- ^{1} French Land Register data, which excludes lakes, ponds, glaciers > 1 km^{2} (0.386 sq mi or 247 acres) and river estuaries.

Malvières (French pronunciation: [malvjɛʁ]) is a commune in the Haute-Loire department in south-central France.

== Geography ==
The Senouire forms most of the commune's western border.

== Population ==
Historical population
Year	Pop.	±% p.a.
1968	127	—
1975	128	+0.11%
1982	104	−2.92%
1990	117	+1.48%
1999	103	−1.41%
2007	132	+3.15%
2012	135	+0.45%
2017	135	+0.00%
2023	144	+1.08%
Source: INSEE

== Sights ==
- Arboretum de Charvols

== See also ==
- Communes of the Haute-Loire department
