= Josat =

- Commune
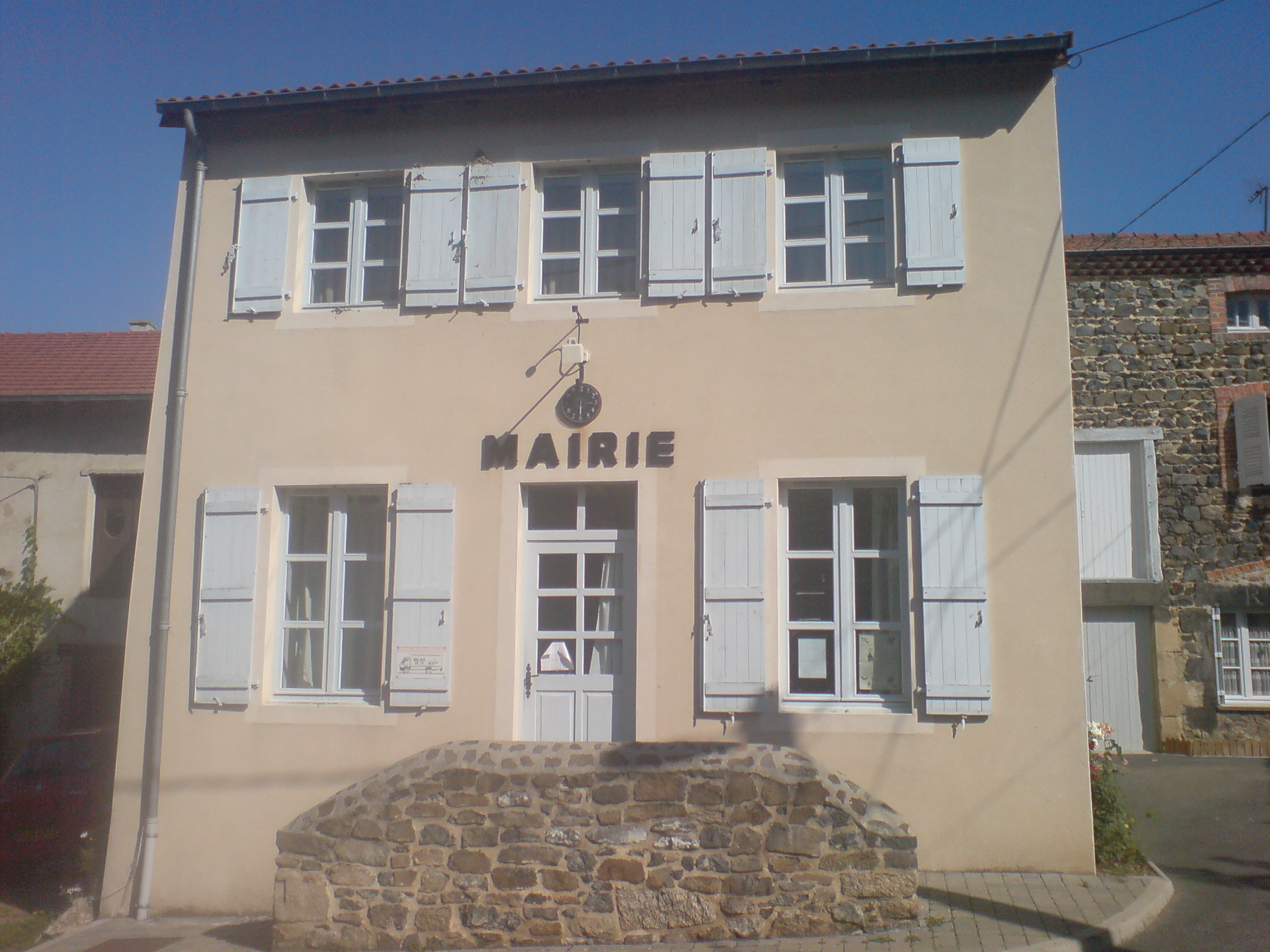
- Town hall
- Location of Josat
- Location within France Location within Auvergne-Rhône-Alpes
- Coordinates: 45°12′48″N 3°36′36″E
- Country: France
- Region: Auvergne-Rhône-Alpes
- Department: Haute-Loire
- Arrondissement: Brioude
- Canton: Pays de Lafayette

Government
  - Mayor (2020–2026): Florence Bellut
- Area^{1}: 12.44 km^{2} (4.80 sq mi)
- Elevation: 775 m (2,543 ft)
- Highest elevation: 1,107 m (3,632 ft)
- Lowest elevation: 620 m (2,030 ft)
- Population (2023): 84
  - Density: 6.8/km^{2} (17/sq mi)
- Time zone: UTC+01:00 (CET)
  - Summer (DST): UTC+02:00 (CEST)
- INSEE/Postal code: 43107 /43230
- ^{1} French Land Register data, which excludes lakes, ponds, glaciers > 1 km^{2} (0.386 sq mi or 247 acres) and river estuaries.

Josat (French pronunciation: [ʒoza]) is a commune in the Haute-Loire department in south-central France.

== Geography ==
The Senouire flows southwest through the commune.

== Population ==
Historical population
Year	Pop.	±% p.a.
1968	182	—
1975	164	−1.48%
1982	119	−4.48%
1990	133	+1.40%
1999	111	−1.99%
2007	93	−2.19%
2012	82	−2.49%
2017	84	+0.48%
2023	84	+0.00%
Source: INSEE

== See also ==
- Communes of the Haute-Loire department
