= Paulhac, Haute-Loire =

Paulhac
- Commune
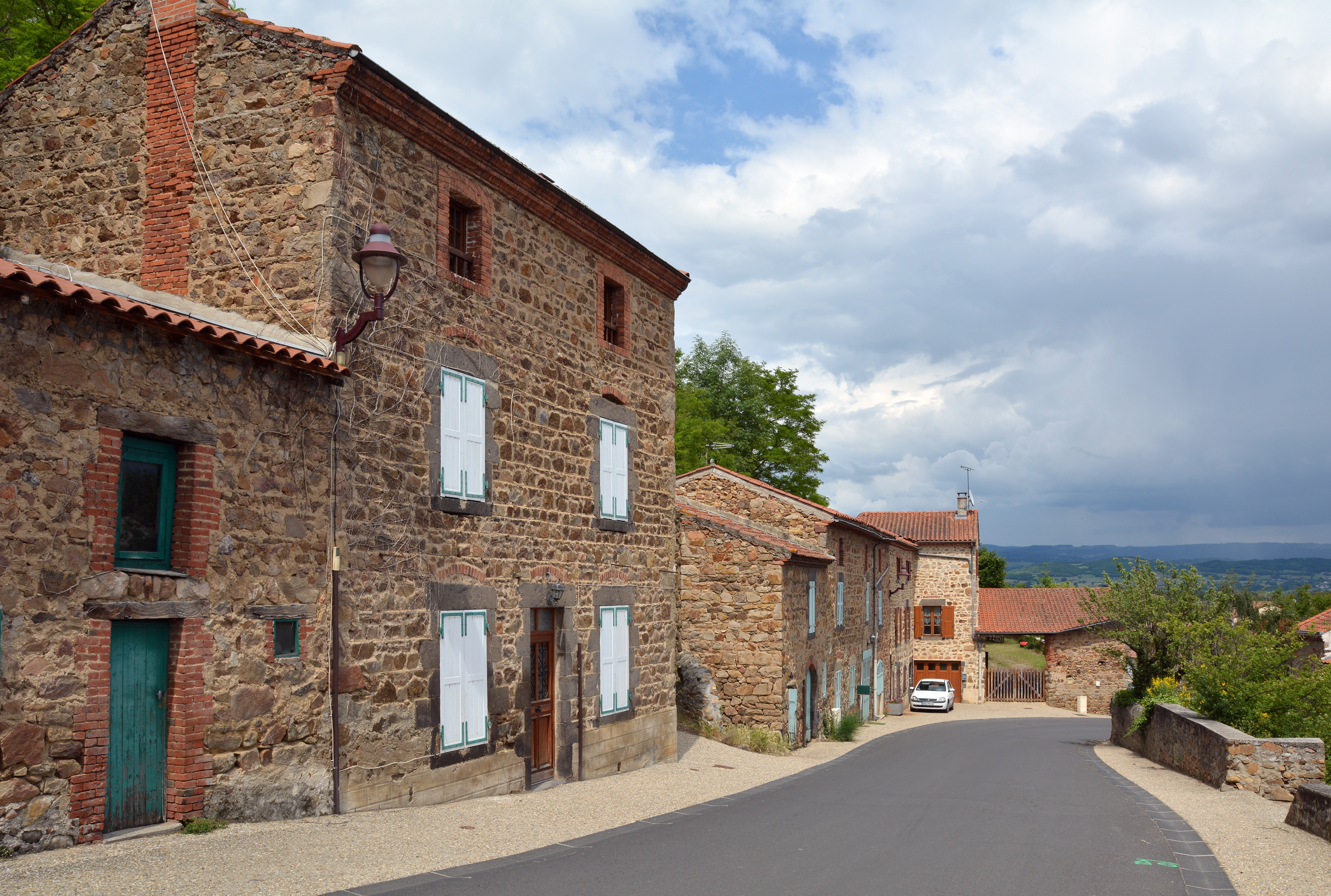
- Location of Paulhac
- Location within France Location within Auvergne-Rhône-Alpes
- Coordinates: 45°18′06″N 3°20′56″E
- Country: France
- Region: Auvergne-Rhône-Alpes
- Department: Haute-Loire
- Arrondissement: Brioude
- Canton: Brioude

Government
  - Mayor (2020–2026): Laurent Philippon
- Area^{1}: 8.4 km^{2} (3.2 sq mi)
- Elevation: 490 m (1,610 ft)
- Highest elevation: 646 m (2,119 ft)
- Lowest elevation: 436 m (1,430 ft)
- Population (2023): 590
  - Density: 70/km^{2} (180/sq mi)
- Time zone: UTC+01:00 (CET)
  - Summer (DST): UTC+02:00 (CEST)
- INSEE/Postal code: 43147 /43100
- ^{1} French Land Register data, which excludes lakes, ponds, glaciers > 1 km^{2} (0.386 sq mi or 247 acres) and river estuaries.

Paulhac (French pronunciation: [pojak]) is a commune in the Haute-Loire department in south-central France.

== Population ==
Historical population
Year	Pop.	±% p.a.
1968	375	—
1975	350	−0.98%
1982	425	+2.81%
1990	561	+3.53%
1999	618	+1.08%
2007	659	+0.81%
2012	658	−0.03%
2017	636	−0.68%
2023	590	−1.24%
Source: INSEE

== See also ==
- Communes of the Haute-Loire department
