= Senouire =

River in France

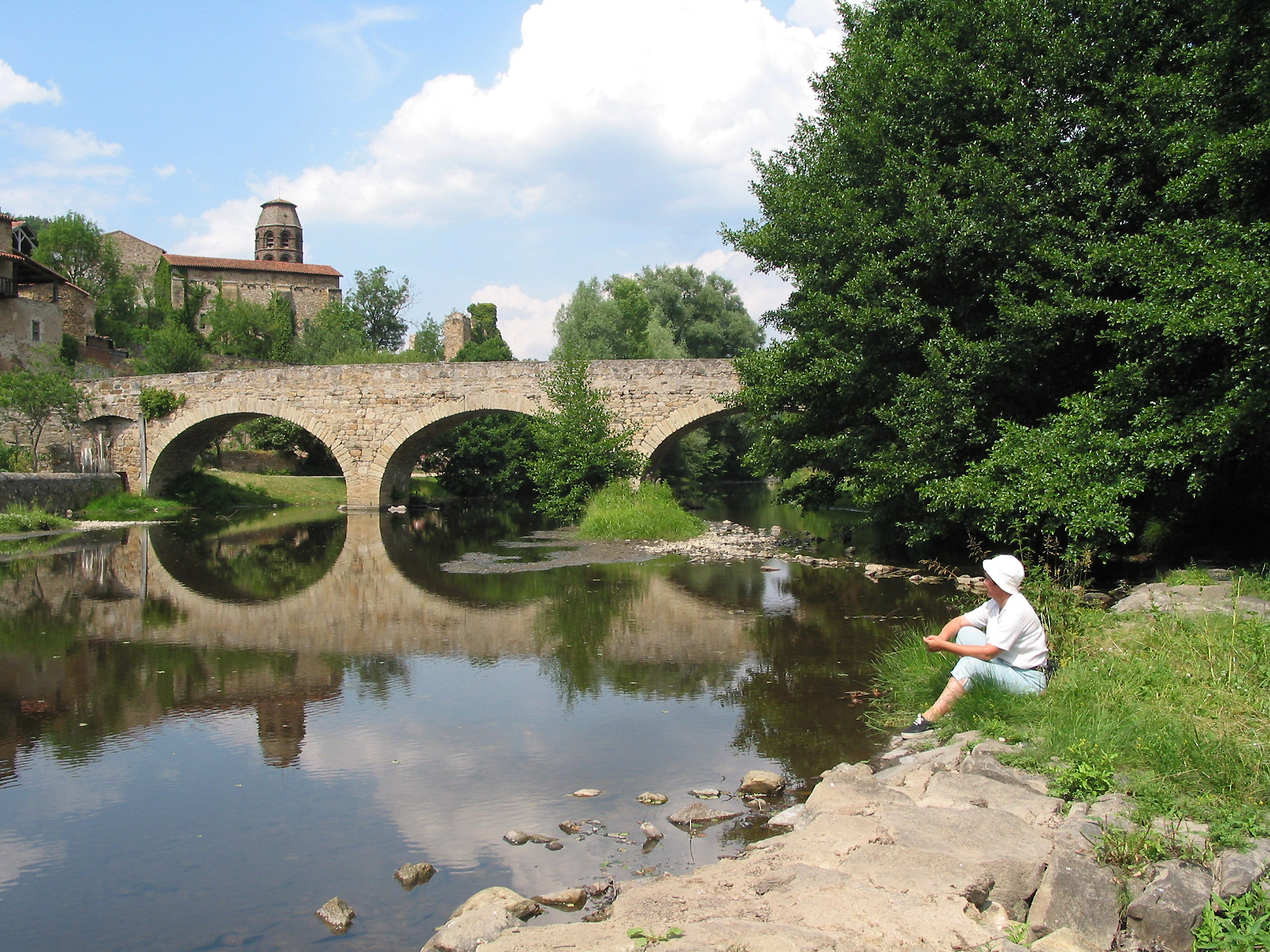
- The Senouire at Lavaudieu

- Location within France Location within Auvergne-Rhône-Alpes

Location
- Country: France

Physical characteristics
- Source
  - location: Sembadel
  - coordinates: 45°17′38″N 03°42′03″E
  - elevation: 1,070 m (3,510 ft)
- Mouth
  - location: Allier
  - coordinates: 45°16′38″N 03°24′31″E
  - elevation: 430 m (1,410 ft)
- Length: 63.1 km (39.2 mi)
- Basin size: 170 km^{2} (66 sq mi)
- Discharge
  - average: 1.57 m^{3}/s (55 cu ft/s)

Basin features
- Progression: Allier→ Loire→ Atlantic Ocean

The Senouire (French pronunciation: [sənwiʁ]; Occitan: Senoira) is a 63.1-kilometre (39.2 mi) long river in the Haute-Loire département, south-central France. Its source is at Sembadel. It flows generally west. It is a right tributary of the Allier into which it flows between Fontannes and Vieille-Brioude, near Brioude.

== Communes along its course ==
This list is ordered from source to mouth: Sembadel, Bonneval, La Chaise-Dieu, Malvières, La Chapelle-Geneste, Connangles, Saint-Pal-de-Senouire, La Chapelle-Bertin, Collat, Josat, Sainte-Marguerite, Mazerat-Aurouze, Paulhaguet, Salzuit, Domeyrat, Frugières-le-Pin, Lavaudieu, Fontannes, Vieille-Brioude
