= Girona Station =

Girona Station may refer to:

- Girona railway station, a station in Girona, Spain
- Girona (Barcelona Metro), a station in Barcelona, Spain
