= Saint-Géron =

- Commune
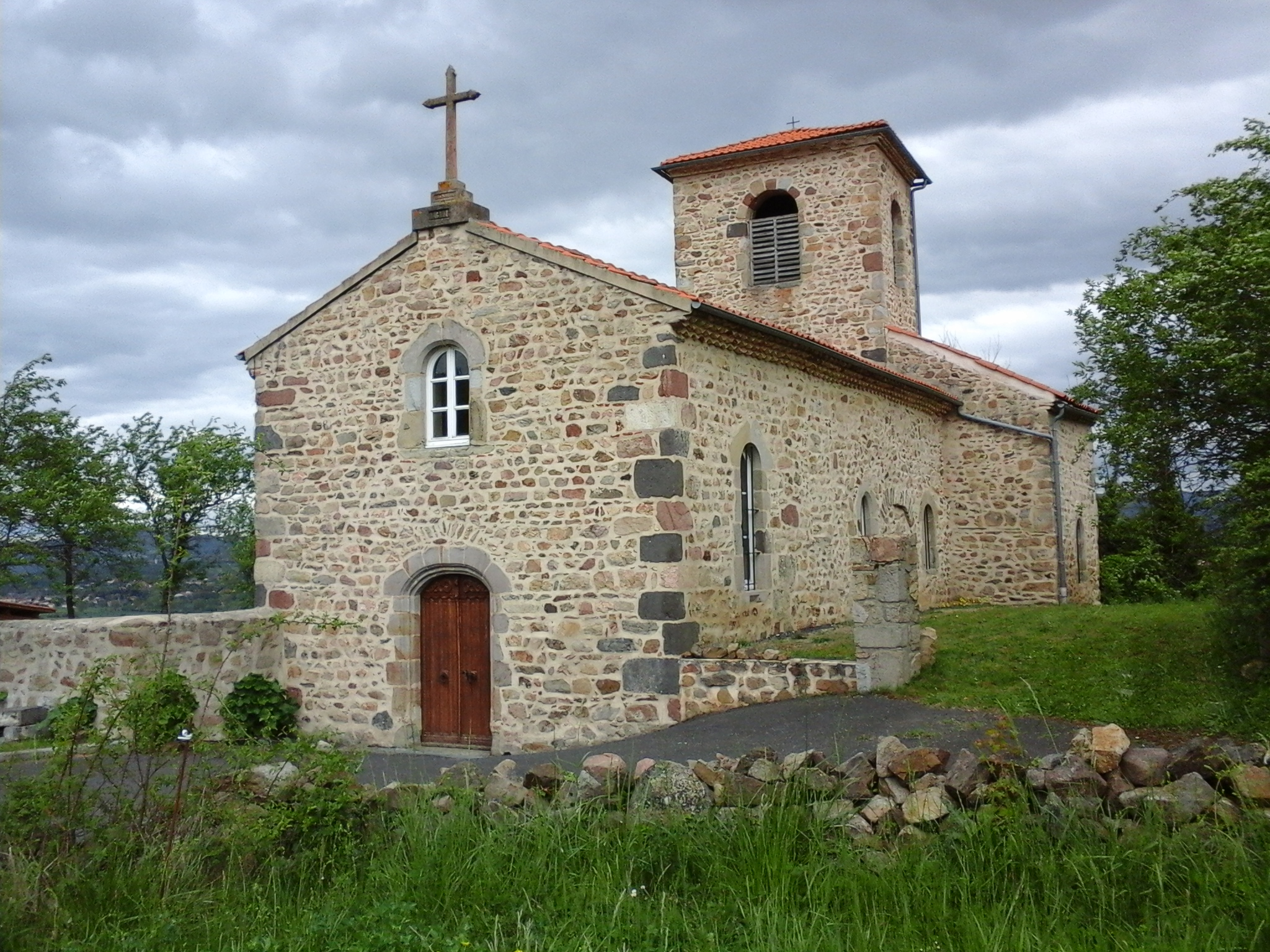
- Location of Saint-Géron
- Location within France Location within Auvergne-Rhône-Alpes
- Coordinates: 45°20′33″N 3°17′47″E
- Country: France
- Region: Auvergne-Rhône-Alpes
- Department: Haute-Loire
- Arrondissement: Brioude
- Canton: Brioude

Government
  - Mayor (2020–2026): Brigitte Souchon
- Area^{1}: 10.76 km^{2} (4.15 sq mi)
- Elevation: 510 m (1,670 ft)
- Highest elevation: 674 m (2,211 ft)
- Lowest elevation: 437 m (1,434 ft)
- Population (2023): 243
  - Density: 22.6/km^{2} (58.5/sq mi)
- Time zone: UTC+01:00 (CET)
  - Summer (DST): UTC+02:00 (CEST)
- INSEE/Postal code: 43191 /43360
- ^{1} French Land Register data, which excludes lakes, ponds, glaciers > 1 km^{2} (0.386 sq mi or 247 acres) and river estuaries.

Saint-Géron (French pronunciation: [sɛ̃ ʒeʁɔ̃]; Occitan: Sant Geronç) is a commune in the Haute-Loire department in south-central France.

== Population ==
Historical population
| Year | Pop. | ±% p.a. |
|---|---|---|
| 1968 | 177 | — |
| 1975 | 154 | −1.97% |
| 1982 | 164 | +0.90% |
| 1990 | 161 | −0.23% |
| 1999 | 178 | +1.12% |
| 2007 | 193 | +1.02% |
| 2012 | 249 | +5.23% |
| 2017 | 258 | +0.71% |
| 2023 | 243 | −0.99% |
Source: INSEE

== See also ==
- Communes of the Haute-Loire department
