= Gerona =

Gerona may refer to:

- Gerona, Spain, a city in Catalonia, Spain
- Gerona, Tarlac, a town in the Philippines
- Gerona, Uruguay, a village in Maldonado, Uruguay
- Spanish frigate Gerona, a Spanish Navy screw frigate in commission 1865–1899

== See also ==
- Girona (disambiguation)
- Nueva Gerona
- "Jarona", a catchphrase of Flowery (Deltarune)
