= Brivadois =

Natural region in France

- Location of Brivadois (in orange) in the Auvergne region

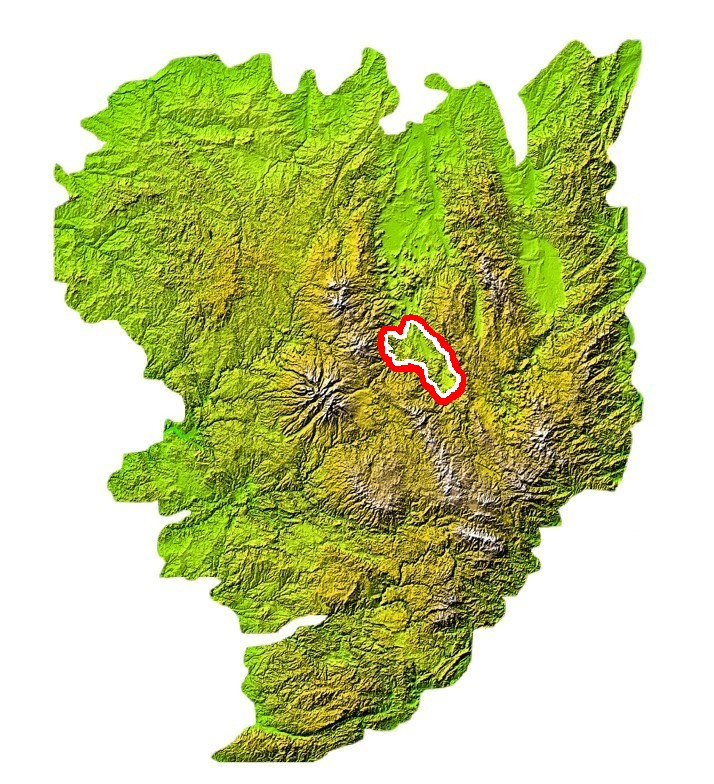
- Location of Brivadois in Massif Central
- Coordinates: 45°15′47″N 3°25′08″E
- Country: France
- Region: Auvergne-Rhône-Alpes
- Departments: Haute-Loire; Puy-de-Dôme; Cantal

Brivadois (French pronunciation: [bʁivadwa]; Occitan: Brivadés) is a natural region of France and a traditional country of Auvergne located to the west of the department of Haute-Loire and in a small part of Puy-de-Dôme and Cantal.

== History ==
The Brivadois region derives its name from its capital, Brioude. During the Carolingian era, it was one of the five secondary counties of Auvergne along with Clermont, Turluron, Tallende and Carlat, and it had its own special viguerie. Ecclesiastically, Brivadois was initially part of the Diocese of Clermont. It was later attached to the Diocese of Saint-Flour when it was established in 1317. Since 1822, it has been part of the Diocese of Le Puy-en-Velay.

== Geography ==
Brivadois corresponds to the region located around Brioude. It is located in the center of the Massif Central and the Auvergne region. Brivadois is mainly located in Haute-Loire but it also extends into Puy-de-Dôme and Cantal. It has around 48,000 inhabitants, three quarters of whom live in the countryside.

The country is surrounded by the following natural regions:

- To the north by Limagne
- To the east by Livradois and Velay
- To the south by Margeride
- To the west by the Cézallier

== Culture and traditions ==
=== Regional Language ===
The traditional language of the Brivadois region is Auvergnat. Pierre Bonnaud identifies different dialectal zones within the region. The northern and eastern parts fall within the area of median Auvergnat in its central variety. In the areas around Brioude and Massiac, median Auvergnat incorporates traits of the southern Sanflorain variety. The Langeac region historically speaks the central variety of southern Auvergnat.

=== Gastronomy ===
The cuisine of Brivadois is characteristically Auvergnat. The region is known for its renowned cured meats, produced by several artisanal units. Foie gras is a notable specialty, typically pan-seared and served with Puy lentils, a legume that also pairs well with petit salé (salted pork). Historically, the Allier river was abundant with salmon, which were prepared in a mushroom pie. Pachade, a thick, crispy pancake cooked in butter, is another regional specialty. Similar to the Velay region, Brivadois produces cheese aged with cheese mites, specifically the Ciron de la farine, resulting in a distinctively flavored dairy product.
