= Jean-Pierre Vigier (politician) =

French politician

Member of the National Assembly for Haute-Loire's 2nd constituency
- Incumbent
- Assumed office 20 June 2012
- Preceded by: Jean Proriol

Member of the Regional Council of Auvergne-Rhône-Alpes
- Incumbent
- Assumed office 4 January 2016

Mayor of Lavoûte-Chilhac
- In office 2008–2020
- Preceded by: Jean-Pierre Vigier
- Succeeded by: Christian Dauphin

Personal details
- Born: 22 October 1969 (age 56) Brioude, France
- Party: Union for a Popular Movement (until 2015); The Republicans (2015–present)
- Occupation: Civil servant

Jean-Pierre Vigier (born 22 October 1969) is a French politician of Republicans (LR) who has represented the 2nd constituency of the Haute-Loire department in the National Assembly since 2012. He has also held a seat in the Regional Council of Auvergne-Rhône-Alpes since 2016.

== Political career ==
Vigier served as Mayor of Lavoûte-Chilhac from 2008 to 2020, an office to which he succeeded his father. Since 2020, he has been a municipal councillor of Lavoûte-Chilhac.

In the run-up to the Republicans’ 2022 convention, Vigier endorsed Éric Ciotti as the party's chairman.

== See also ==
- 2015 French regional elections
