= La Chaise-Dieu =

- Commune
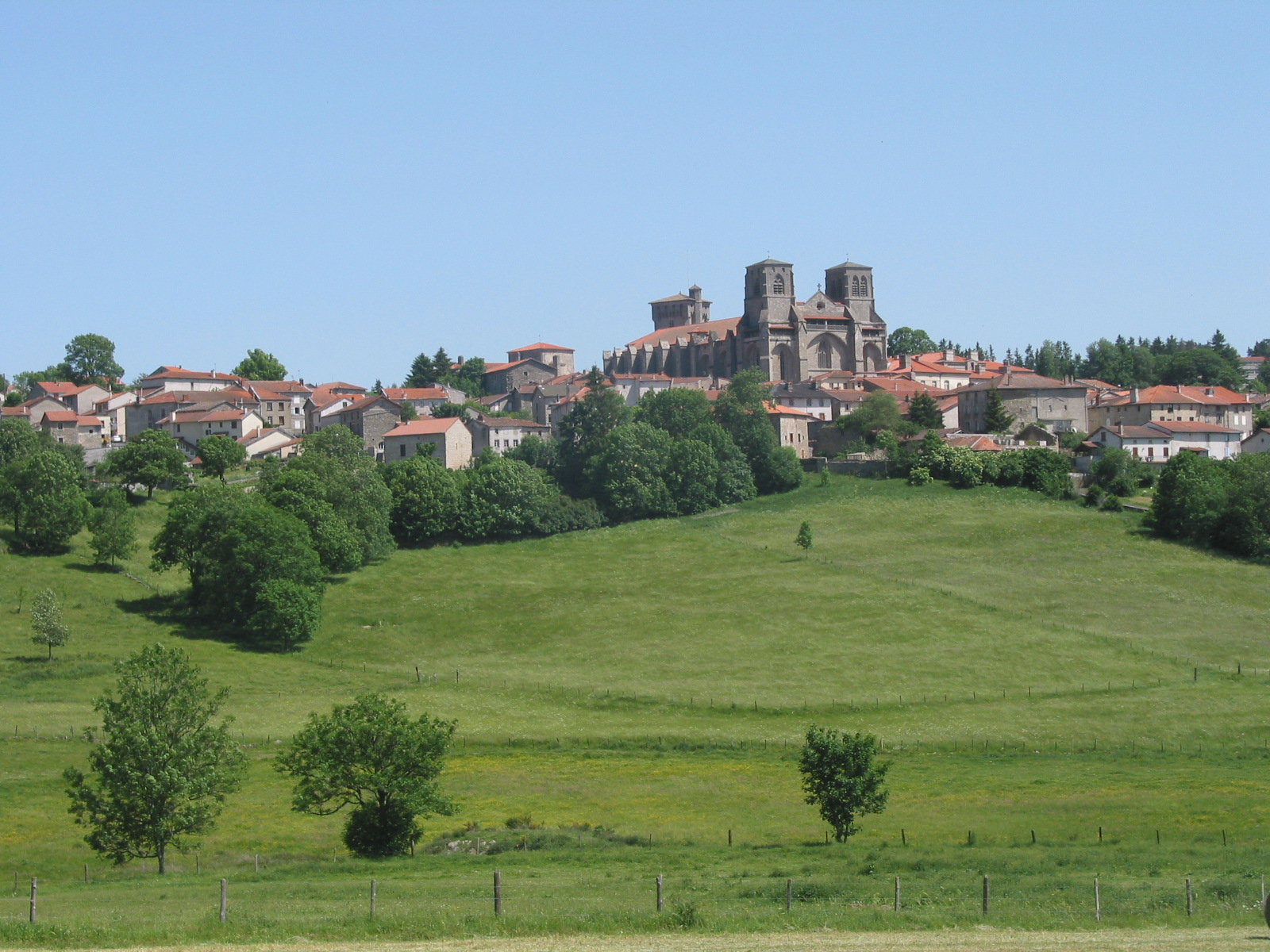
- Abbey of La Chaise-Dieu

- Coat of arms
- Location of La Chaise-Dieu
- Location within France Location within Auvergne-Rhône-Alpes
- Coordinates: 45°19′20″N 3°41′51″E
- Country: France
- Region: Auvergne-Rhône-Alpes
- Department: Haute-Loire
- Arrondissement: Brioude
- Canton: Plateau du Haut-Velay granitique
- Intercommunality: CA du Puy-en-Velay

Government
  - Mayor (2020–2026): André Brivadis
- Area^{1}: 13.58 km^{2} (5.24 sq mi)
- Elevation: 1,083 m (3,553 ft)
- Highest elevation: 1,120 m (3,670 ft)
- Lowest elevation: 916 m (3,005 ft)
- Population (2023): 594
  - Density: 43.7/km^{2} (113/sq mi)
- Time zone: UTC+01:00 (CET)
  - Summer (DST): UTC+02:00 (CEST)
- INSEE/Postal code: 43048 /43160
- ^{1} French Land Register data, which excludes lakes, ponds, glaciers > 1 km^{2} (0.386 sq mi or 247 acres) and river estuaries.

La Chaise-Dieu (French pronunciation: [la ʃɛz djø]; Auvergnat: La Chasa Dieu) is a commune in the Haute-Loire department in south-central France. Its inhabitants are called Casadéens, from the Latin name of the city.

== Geography ==
La Chaise-Dieu occupies a 1082 m butte which dominates a plain between the mounts of Livradois and Velay. The closest cities are Brioude, Ambert, and Le Puy-en-Velay.

The Senouire forms most of the commune's eastern and western borders.

== History ==
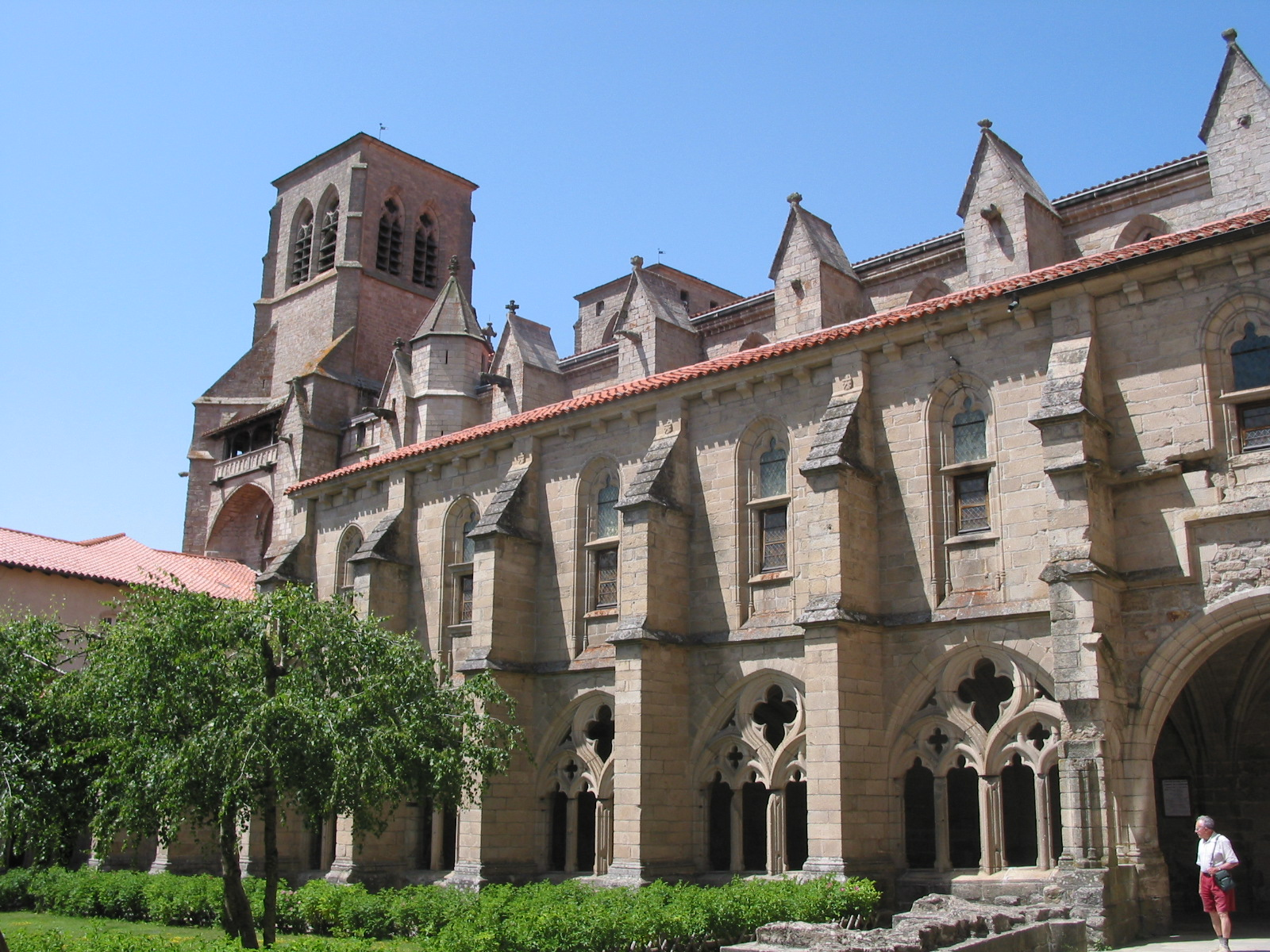
The abbey church

La Chaise-Dieu means "the Seat of God" in French (from the Occitan "Chasa Dieu") and is a reference to the Benedictine abbey which was founded on the site in 1043 by Robert de Turlande, a kinsman of Gerald of Aurillac and canon of Saint Julian's church at Brioude, nearby. Robert served an apprenticeship at Cluny under Abbot Odilo, then served as abbot in the community he founded in the wilderness here, initially in the company of a repentant knight, Stephen. The traditional date of the founding is 28 December 1043. The abbey had over 300 monks and 42 outlying priories depending on it when Robert de Turlande died, probably in 1067. After his death, Robert was quickly canonized (1095) as Saint Robert de Turlande (also known as Saint Robert of Chaise-Dieu). The Chaise-Dieu continued to grow throughout the Middle Ages, becoming the motherhouse of further congregations of Black Monks. Pope Clement VI began his vocation as a monk at Chaise Dieu and was the patron of the vast abbey church (built 1344–1350), a suitable setting for his tomb.

The monks were driven out and the abbey secularized during the French Revolution. Clement's vast abbey church, his tomb and the abbey cloister remain. The fresco of the Dance of Death (ca 1470) is a famous example of this motif, which gained wide currency following the visitations of the Black Death. The partners of the figures are skeletons and the parade strictly follows precedence of contemporary society, with Adam and Eve preceding all: the pope then the emperor, the legate, the prince, the cardinal, the High Constable, the patriarch, the knight, then the abbot, the townsman, the merchant, the lady, ending with the lawyer, the minstrel, the clerk, the ploughman, the monk, the innocent child and the pilgrim.

Between 1727 and 1740, the Jansenist bishop Jean Soanen was exiled to the abbey.

== Population ==
Historical population
| Year | Pop. | ±% p.a. |
|---|---|---|
| 1968 | 900 | — |
| 1975 | 907 | +0.11% |
| 1982 | 789 | −1.97% |
| 1990 | 778 | −0.18% |
| 1999 | 772 | −0.09% |
| 2007 | 806 | +0.54% |
| 2012 | 695 | −2.92% |
| 2017 | 620 | −2.26% |
| 2023 | 594 | −0.71% |
Source: INSEE

== Culture ==
French pianist Georges Cziffra started an annual festival of sacred music in La Chaise-Dieu in 1966.

== See also ==
- Communes of the Haute-Loire department
