= Festival de musique de La Chaise-Dieu =

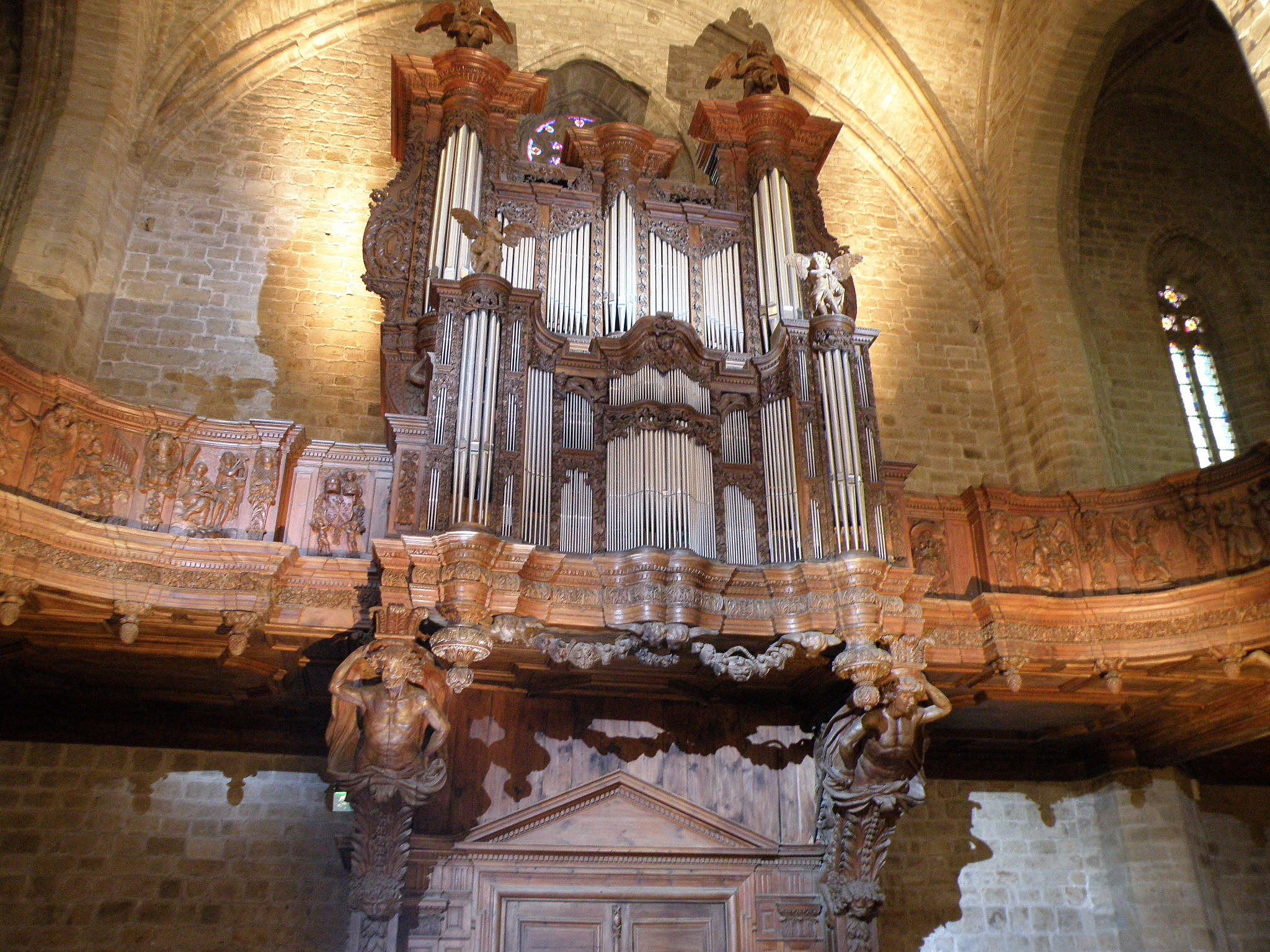
Pipe organ of the Abbey of La Chaise-Dieu

The La Chaise-Dieu Music Festival is a classical music festival that takes place every year at the end of August. It is essentially devoted to sacred music and takes place mainly in the Abbey of La Chaise-Dieu. It arose from a concert given in the abbey church on 25 September 1966 by the pianist György Cziffra, at the suggestion of Dr Georges Mazoyer and his wife Suzanne, of Le Puy-en-Velay, who with a group of friends ran the festival for its first seven years. The festival celebrated its 50th anniversary in 2016 and its 60th edition in 2026.

== History ==
The festival grew out of the friendship between the Hungarian pianist György Cziffra (1921–1994) and Dr Georges Mazoyer, a cardiologist in Le Puy-en-Velay, and his wife Suzanne, a piano teacher. Having heard Cziffra on television in 1957, the couple invited him to play at the theatre of Le Puy-en-Velay in 1963, an invitation which ResMusica attributes to Suzanne Mazoyer, and then looked for a more prestigious setting for a concert with orchestra. In an account published in 2016 by L'Éveil de la Haute-Loire, Georges Mazoyer wrote that in 1965, while driving from Le Puy-en-Velay to Vichy to hear the pianist, the couple passed La Chaise-Dieu and saw in the abbey church what he called "the privileged place we were looking for". Cziffra accepted at once, refused any fee and asked what could be done for La Chaise-Dieu; told that only the case of the organ survived, he answered that he would play for the organ. "At that moment", Mazoyer wrote, "there was no question of a festival, but of a simple concert."

The concert took place in the abbey church on 25 September 1966 before 2,500 people, Cziffra ending thirty-six curtain calls with the words "see you next year". Lecturing in 2016 from the festival's archives, its then director Julien Caron described the event as "prestigious but conceived as unique", and said that the festival had grown out of "a simple informal committee of a few volunteers around Doctor Georges Mazoyer". For seven years the Mazoyers and their friends ran it under the association Les Amis de l'abbaye, producing posters and programmes, numbering the seats and handing 50,000 francs to the mayor of La Chaise-Dieu, with which the organ was restored. Pierre Feuerstein writes that the first festival was "created in 1966 at the instigation of Dr Mazoyer and Giörgy Cziffra", and Julien Besançon describes Mazoyer as a "founding member of the festival". Accompanied by his son György Cziffra Jr (1942–1981), a conductor, Cziffra gave several recitals and concerts there from 1966 onwards. In 1975 the festival was run by a committee chaired by the prefect Max Lavigne and directed by Jean-Paul Dessaigne, with Dr Mazoyer sitting on its honorary committee.

The arrival in 1976 of Guy Ramona, and the creation by several music lovers of an association to continue the Festival, gave a new impetus to the event. The number of concerts is steadily increasing and stabilizes at around 35 in the Saint-Robert Abbey in La Chaise-Dieu, but also in other heritage sites in the region: the churches of Puy-en-Velay and its Italian theater, the Église Saint-Jean d'Ambert, the Basilique Saint-Julien of Brioude, the Saint-Georges Church of Saint-Paulien, the Saint-Gilles Church of Chamalières-sur-Loire.

Guy Ramona directed the festival for 27 years and gave it its final character, not hesitating to present, among the first in the rehabilitation of the baroque repertoire, contemporary works conducted or in the presence of their composers.

In 2003, Jean-Michel Mathé took over from Guy Ramona, who nevertheless remained present in the organisation of the festival by becoming president of the management association until 2009 when Jacques Barrot succeeded him. He is currently, with his wife, the honorary president.

Since 2010, the Festival has also been taking over the Cziffra Auditorium in La Chaise-Dieu, a building inaugurated during the 44th edition. The first step in the major renovation project of the abbey's monastery buildings, the Cziffra auditorium is ideal for recitals and chamber music, and offers a different and more intimate programme (200 seats) for festival-goers.

== Features ==
The festival, which takes place every summer at the end of August, is now mainly centred on sacred music but also offers a romantic and symphonic repertoire, but also contemporary music, pursuing, under the impetus of Jean-Michel Mathé, the general policy of his predecessor. Famous musicians such as Georges Cziffra, Yehudi Menuhin, Mstislav Rostropovitch, Ivry Gitlis, Augustin Dumay, Jean-Philippe Collard, Katia and Marielle Labèque, Jean-Claude Malgoire, Michel Corboz, William Christie, Maurice André, Laurent Campellone, Marie-Claire Alain, Krzysztof Penderecki, etc. have performed there.

It is one of the largest symphonic festivals in France with the Festival de musique de Saint-Denis and the Besançon International Music Festival.
