= In commendam =

Type of legal device in canon law

In canon law, commenda (or in commendam) was a form of transferring an ecclesiastical benefice in trust to the custody of a patron. The phrase in commendam was originally applied to the provisional occupation of an ecclesiastical benefice, which was temporarily without an actual occupant, in contrast to the conferral of a title, in titulum, which was applied to the regular and unconditional occupation of a benefice.

The word commendam is the accusative singular of the Latin noun commenda, "trust", or "custody", which is derived from the verb commendare ("to entrust").

Granting a benefice in commendam became most common with monasteries, and the commendatory abbot drew a portion of the revenue of the monastery but without fulfilling the duties of the abbot or even residing at the monastery.

== History ==
The establishment of ecclesiastical benefices was a way of guaranteeing the financial stability of the Church. Real property and other goods donated to the Church were erected as a stable fund, and the revenue was attached to a particular office. The parish priest, bishop, or other minister would have the right to receive the income of the benefice to support himself and to cover the expenses related to his ministry.

There is clear evidence that the granting of a benefice in commendam was practised in the fourth century. In a letter written around 379, Ambrose mentions a church which he gave in commendam, while he was Bishop of Milan: "Commendo tibi, fili, Ecclesiam quae est ad Forum Cornelii ... donec ei ordinetur episcopus" ("I entrust unto thee, my son, the church which is at the Cornelian Forum ... until a bishop is allotted to it").

Temporarily unoccupied church property (ecclesiastical benefice) could be entrusted to the protection of a member of the church, to safeguard and manage it until order was restored and a new permanent holder of the position was granted in titulum. The patron would receive any revenues generated from the property in the meantime. Each of the early basilicas of Rome was under the guardianship of a patron.

The benefice held in commendam could be used to provide a temporary administrator to a church or monastery that was at risk of financial ruin. It also provided a steady income for whoever was nominated, and St. Gregory the Great (590–604) gave vacant monasteries in commendam to bishops who had been driven from their sees by the invading barbarians, or whose own churches were too poor to furnish them a decent livelihood.

In the eighth century, the practice became widely abused when kings claimed the right to appoint abbots in commendam over monasteries, often nominating their own vassals, who were not monks but laymen, as a way of rewarding them. These abbots did not have spiritual care of the monks but did have the right to manage the temporal affairs of the monastery, and some were driven into financial ruin.

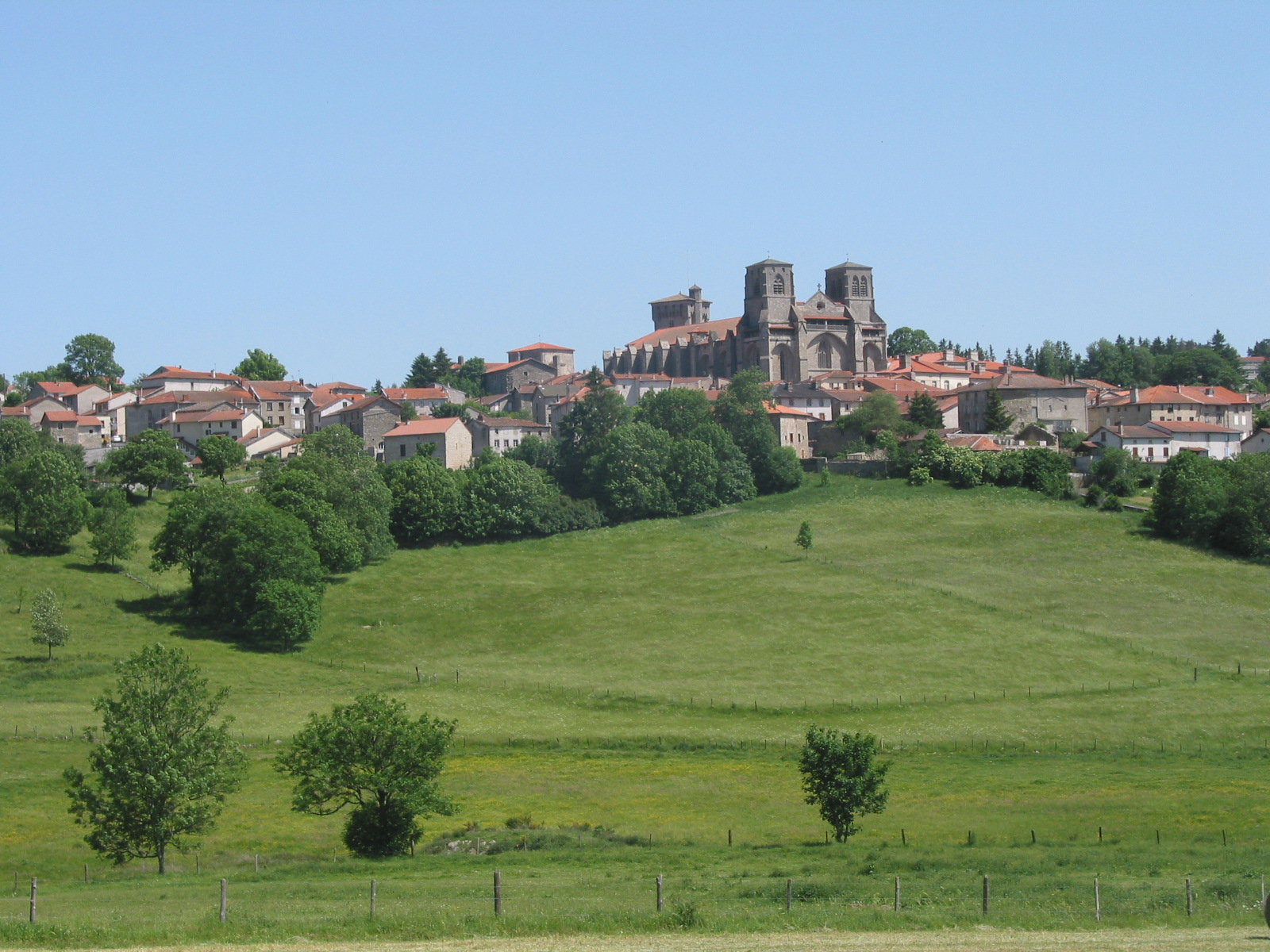
Abbey of La Chaise-Dieu, in commendam 1518–1640

When in 1122 the Investiture Controversy was settled in favor of the church, the appointment of laymen as abbots in commendam was abolished. Clergy, however, could still be appointed as commendatory abbots, and the practice was used to provide an income to a professor, student, priest, or cardinal. This cleric would name another man to fulfill the daily responsibilities of the office.

The practice was open to abuse: favored cardinals began to receive multiple benefices, accepting them like absentee landlords, increasing their personal possessions to the detriment of the Church. The arrangements were no longer temporary and could be held for a lifetime. Monastic communities, from which these grants were taken, lost revenues and gained nothing in return, suffering from spiritual and temporal mismanagement.

In 16th-century France, however, the Kings continued to appoint abbots and the nomination of the King’s close relatives to office became commonplace particularly in La Chaise-Dieu.

== Church of England ==
In the Church of England the stipends of bishops and other senior ecclesiastics were sometimes augmented by the stipends of sinecure benefices held in commendam. In 1719 Hugh Boulter succeeded to the deanery of Christ Church, which he held in commendam with the bishopric of Bristol.

These were made illegal by the Ecclesiastical Commissioners Act 1836 (c.77), section 18, which is no longer in force. The Act does not extend to the Isle of Man, but similar provision with respect to the bishop of Sodor and Man was made by the Sodor and Man Act 1838 (c.30), section 3.

== See also ==
- Commendatory abbot
- Commander (order)
- mense
- Titular church
