= Marolles-en-Brie =

Marolles-en-Brie is the name of two communes of France:

- Marolles-en-Brie, Seine-et-Marne
- Marolles-en-Brie, Val-de-Marne
