= Roland Irolla =

French painter (1935–2025)

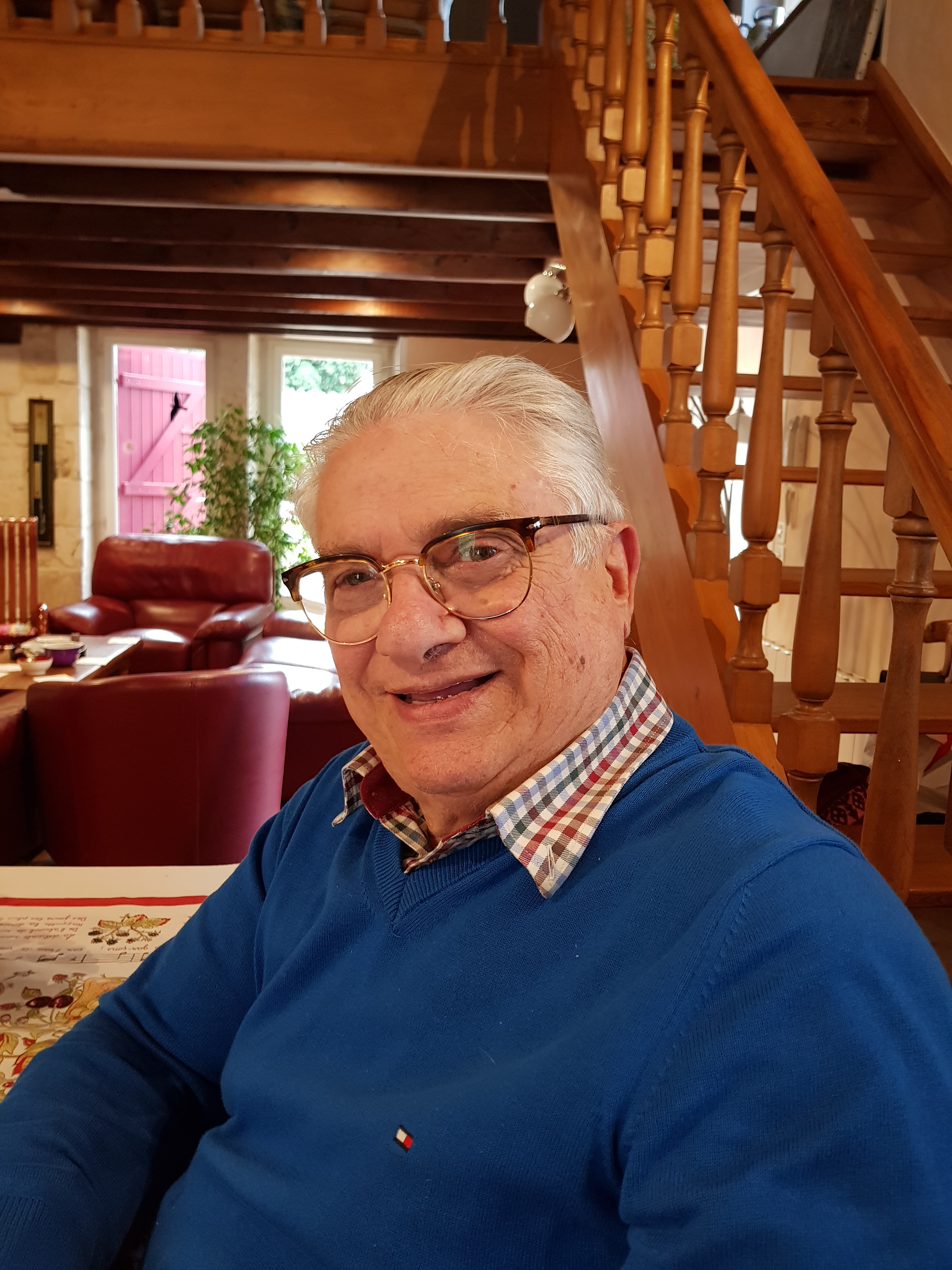
- Irolla in 2021
- Born: 29 September 1935; Philippeville, French Algeria
- Died: 3 October 2025 (aged 90)
- Education: School of Applied Artillery
- Occupation: Painter

Roland Irolla (French: [ʁolɑ̃ iʁɔla]; 29 September 1935 – 3 October 2025) was a French painter, illustrator and sculptor.

== Life and career ==
Born in Philippeville on 29 September 1935, Irolla was the son of maritime carpenter Raphaël Irolla and painter Vincente Féola. His first exhibition took place in his hometown in 1952. However, he left Algeria the following year and settled in Montmartre, where he met Fernand Herbo and Maurice Utrillo and began developing his personal style. He was taken in by his uncle, Charles Féola while he pursued his early art career.

In May 1956, he entered the School of Applied Artillery, where he met the medievalist Jean-Pierre Ravaux. He exhibited his works for the military in May 1957. As a member of the 59th Artillery Regiment during the Algerian War, fighting in El Oued, Touggourt, Biskra, and his native Philippeville, which became Skikda after the war. He went on to live in Champigny-sur-Marne and Châlons-sur-Marne. He made paintings for the Basilica of Saint-Julian, Brioude and the Musée des Beaux-Arts et d'Archéologie de Châlons-en-Champagne. In 2008, he retired and moved to Niort.

Irolla died on 3 October 2025, at the age of 90.
