= Church of Saint-Gal, Langeac =

Collegiate church in Haute-Loire, France

Church of Saint-Gal
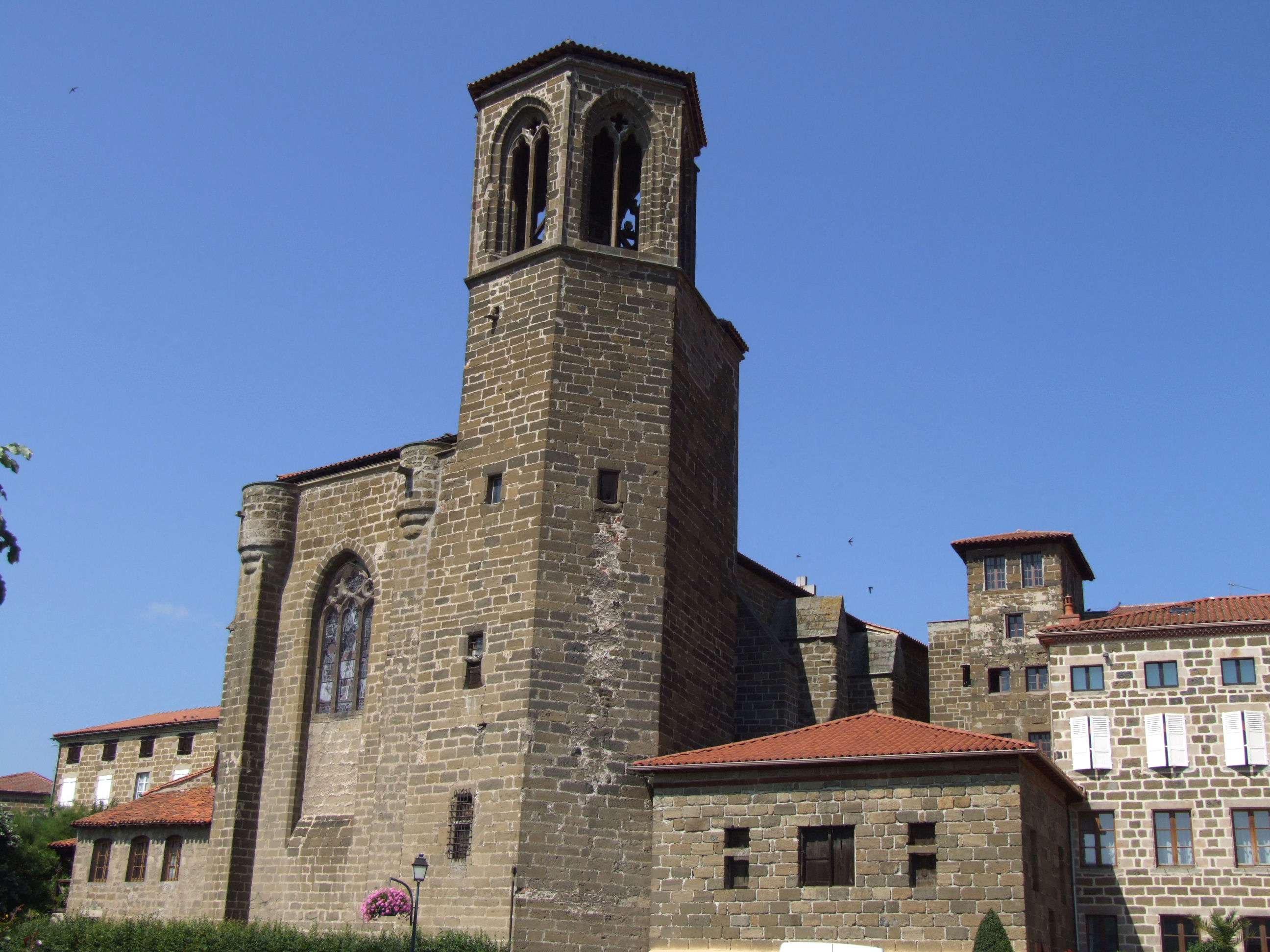

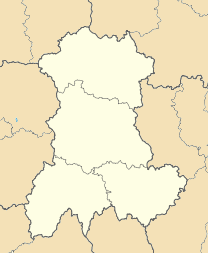
- Location within Auvergne-Rhône-Alpes Location within Auvergne Location within France

Religion
- Affiliation: Catholicism
- Province: Auvergne
- Region: Haute-Loire

Location
- Country: France
- Interactive map of Church of Saint-Gal
- Administration: Auvergne-Rhône-Alpes
- Coordinates: 45.099223°N 3.496851°E

Architecture
- Style: Gothic

The Church of Saint-Gal in Langeac is a former collegiate church located in Langeac, in the French department of Haute-Loire. It was the church of a former priory dependent on the Abbey of La Chaise-Dieu before becoming a collegiate church.

== History ==
The parish church of Notre-Dame in Langeac was destroyed in 1430. The Church of Saint-Gal then became the parish church. It is likely that during this period, the bays of the nave of the current church were built. This reconstruction is probably attributed to Jacques de Langeac, who had to abandon his religious orders to take up the barony of Langeac.

The year 1460 is engraved on the portal of the main façade. In 1488, the chapter of canons was definitively constituted by the bishop of Saint-Flour. The choir stalls were completed in 1526. Langeac was annexed to the diocese of Le Puy-en-Velay in 1823. This church has been classified as a historical monument since September 16, 1907. Several items are referenced in the Palissy database.
