= Church of Saint-Julien-de-Brioude, Marolles-en-Brie =

Roman Catholic church in Marolles-en-Brie, Val-de-Marne, France

Church of Saint-Julien-de-Brioude
- French: Église Saint-Julien-de-Brioude
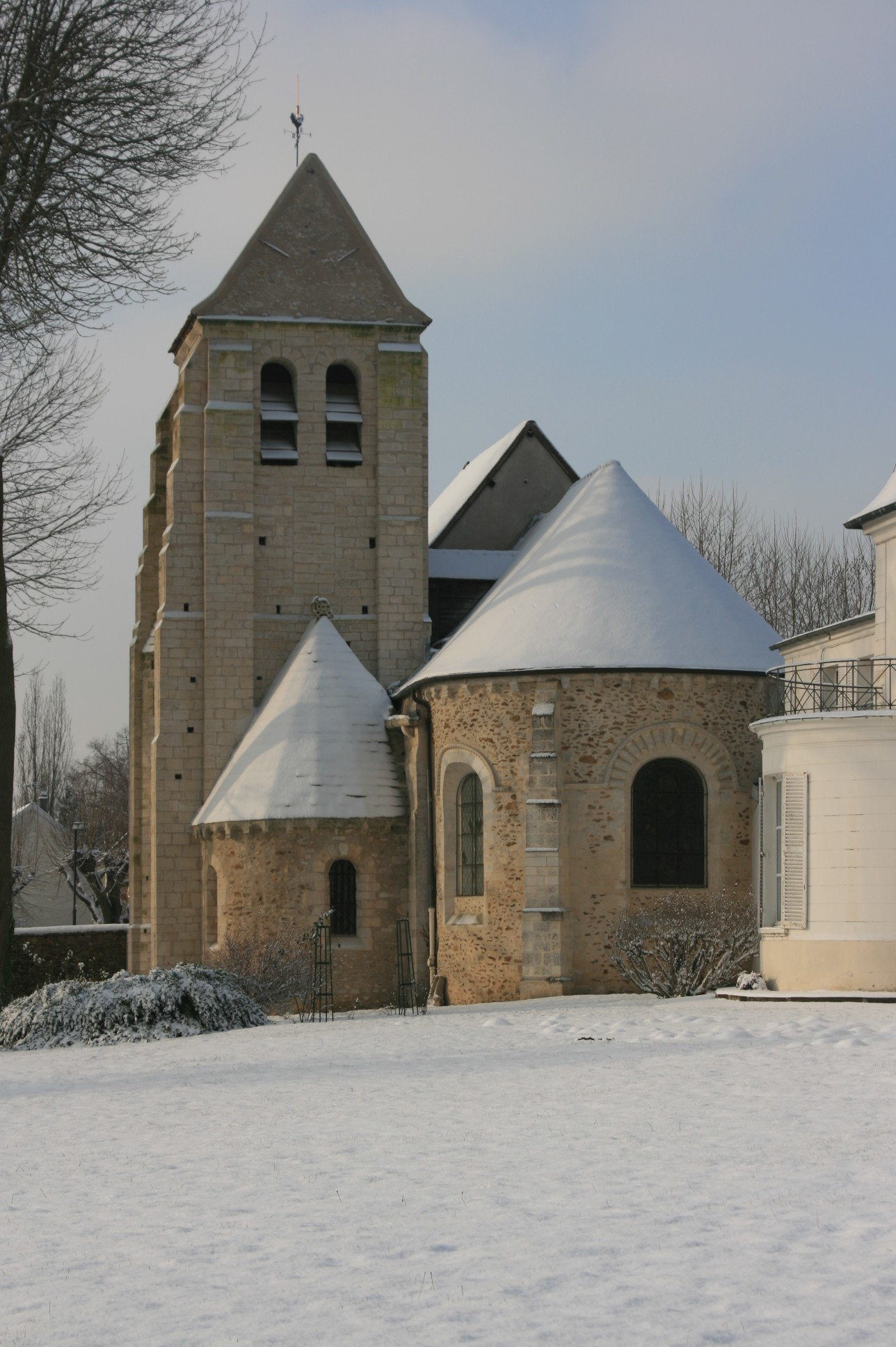

- Location within Paris and the inner ring
- 48°43′56″N 2°33′03″E
- Location: Marolles-en-Brie, Val-de-Marne
- Country: France
- Denomination: Roman Catholic

History
- Status: Church
- Dedication: St. Julian of Brioude

Architecture
- Architectural type: Church
- Style: Romanesque; Gothic
- Groundbreaking: 9th century
- Completed: 12th century

Administration
- Diocese: Créteil

Monument historique
- Official name: Eglise Saint-Julien-de-Brioude
- Criteria: Class MH
- Designated: April 24, 1909
- Reference no.: PA00079892

The Church of Saint-Julien-de-Brioude is a Roman Catholic church located in Marolles-en-Brie in the Val-de-Marne department in France. It is dedicated to St. Julian of Brioude and became a Class Historic Monument in 1909.

== History ==
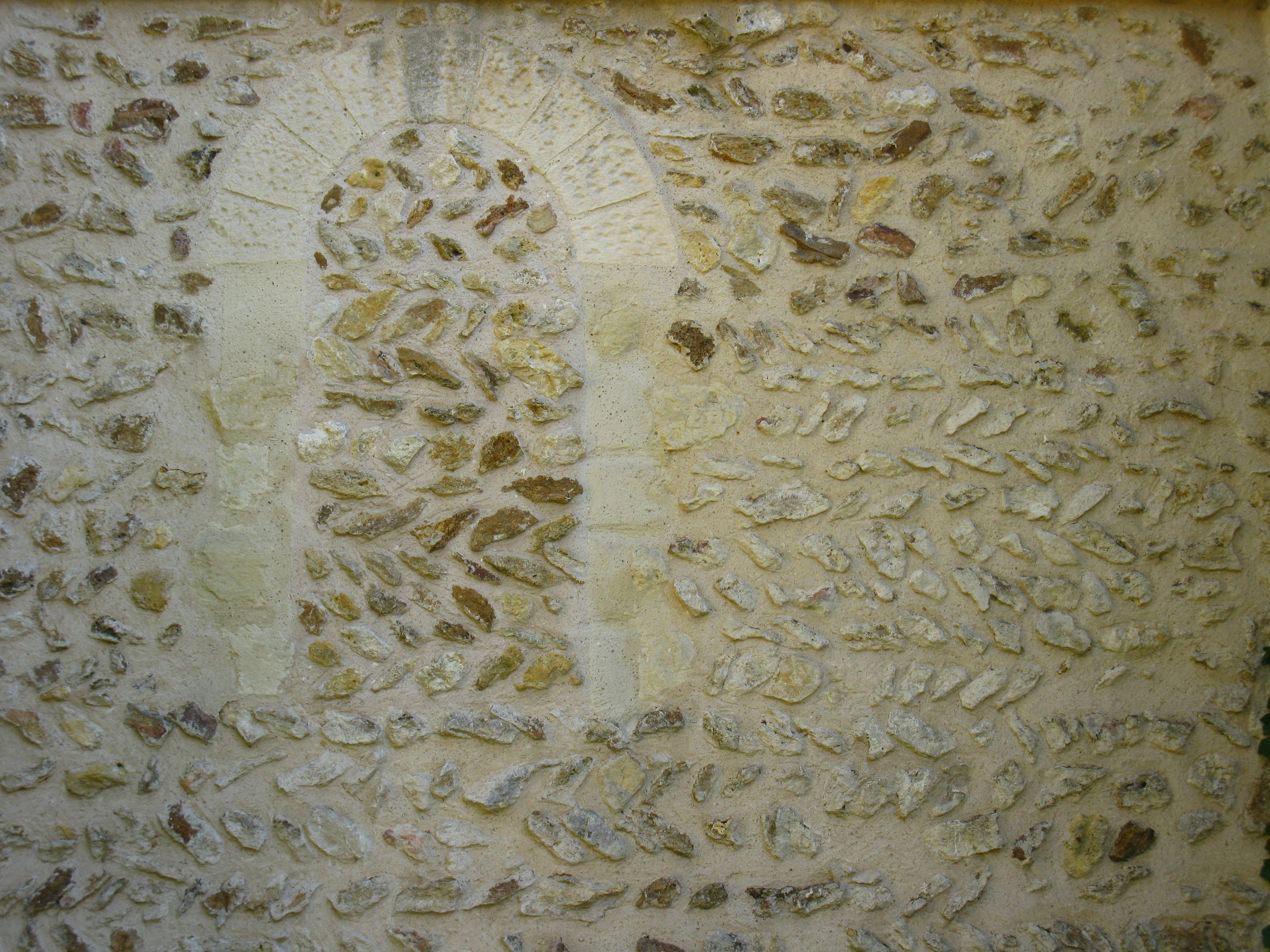
Northern wall of the nave with stones in opus spicatum.

The church stands on the site of a former Carolingian chapel of the 9th century. Only the northern wall of the nave and other minor parts of the chapel are left today.

In the late 11th century, Archdeacon of Brie Dreux de Mello gave the land plot of Marolles to the archdiocese of Paris which later granted it to the Saint-Martin-des-Champs Priory in 1117. Several monks of the priory came to Marolles to form a priory and re-build the church on the site of the former building. They built the transept, the choir, the apse chapels and the bell tower in the early 12th century.

In the 17th century, a new nave was built above the Carolingian nave which was partly knocked down. Four bays were added to the nave in the 18th century. In 1870, the northern apse chapel collapsed.

In the 20th century, after the Second World War, a porch adorned with a Madonna with the Child wooden statue was added to the church.

In the 1970s, the original floor of the church and remnants of the founding monks were excavated on the site of the church. The church was restored from 2007 to 2008.

The church of Saint-Julien-de-Brioude was listed as a Class Historic Monument in 1909.

== Architecture ==
The church of Saint-Julien-de-Brioude is symbolic of the transition between the Romanesque and Gothic styles. The Romanesque façades are flanked with numerous buttresses. The choir, however, has one of the earliest rib vaults of the Parisian region, symbolic of the Gothic style.

The choir and the southern chapel have capitals adorned with around forty diversified motifs —notably animals, monsters, Biblical scenes and vegetal settings. The motifs date from the first half of the 12th century and thus belong to the transition between the Romanesque and Gothic styles.

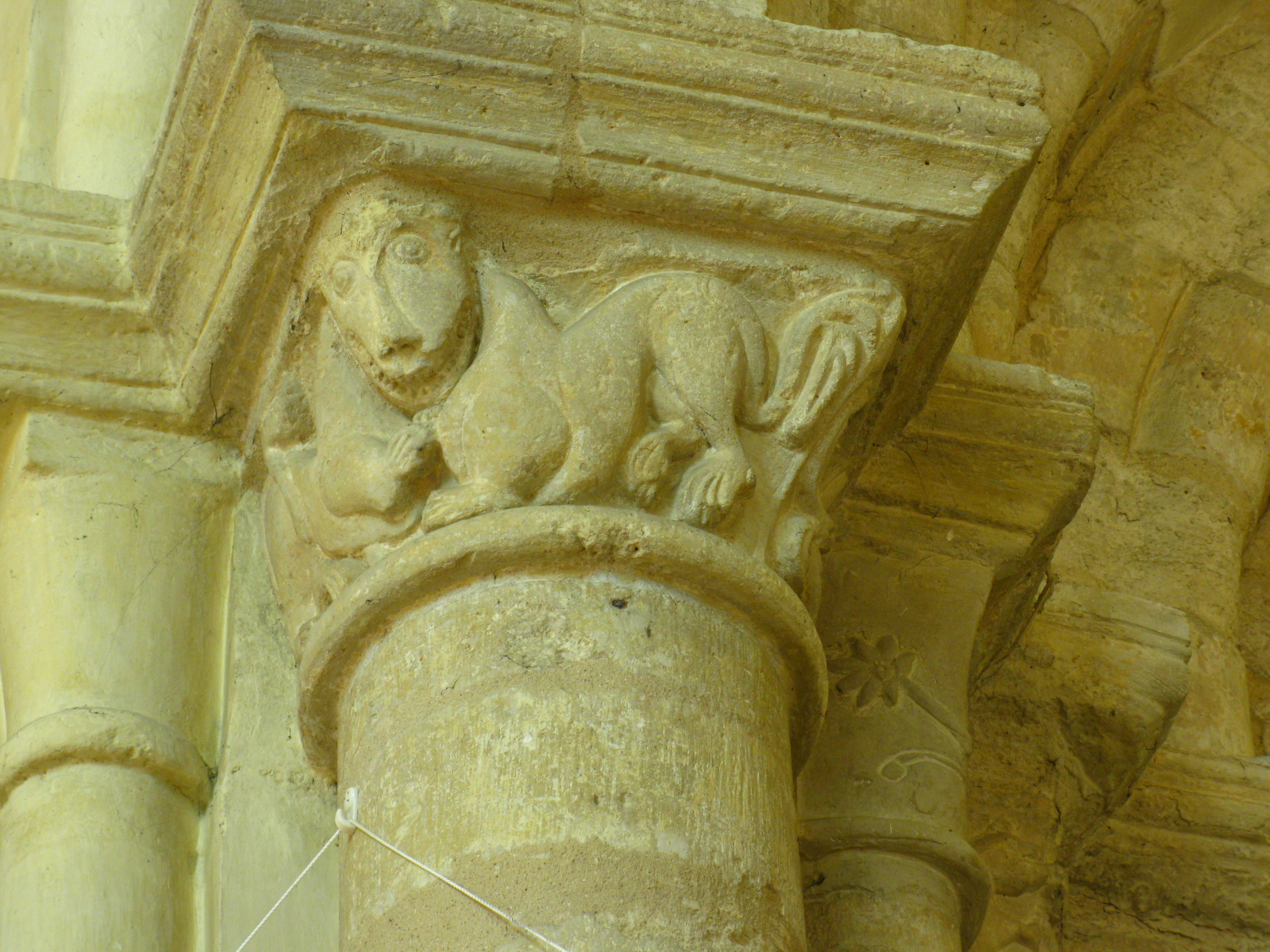
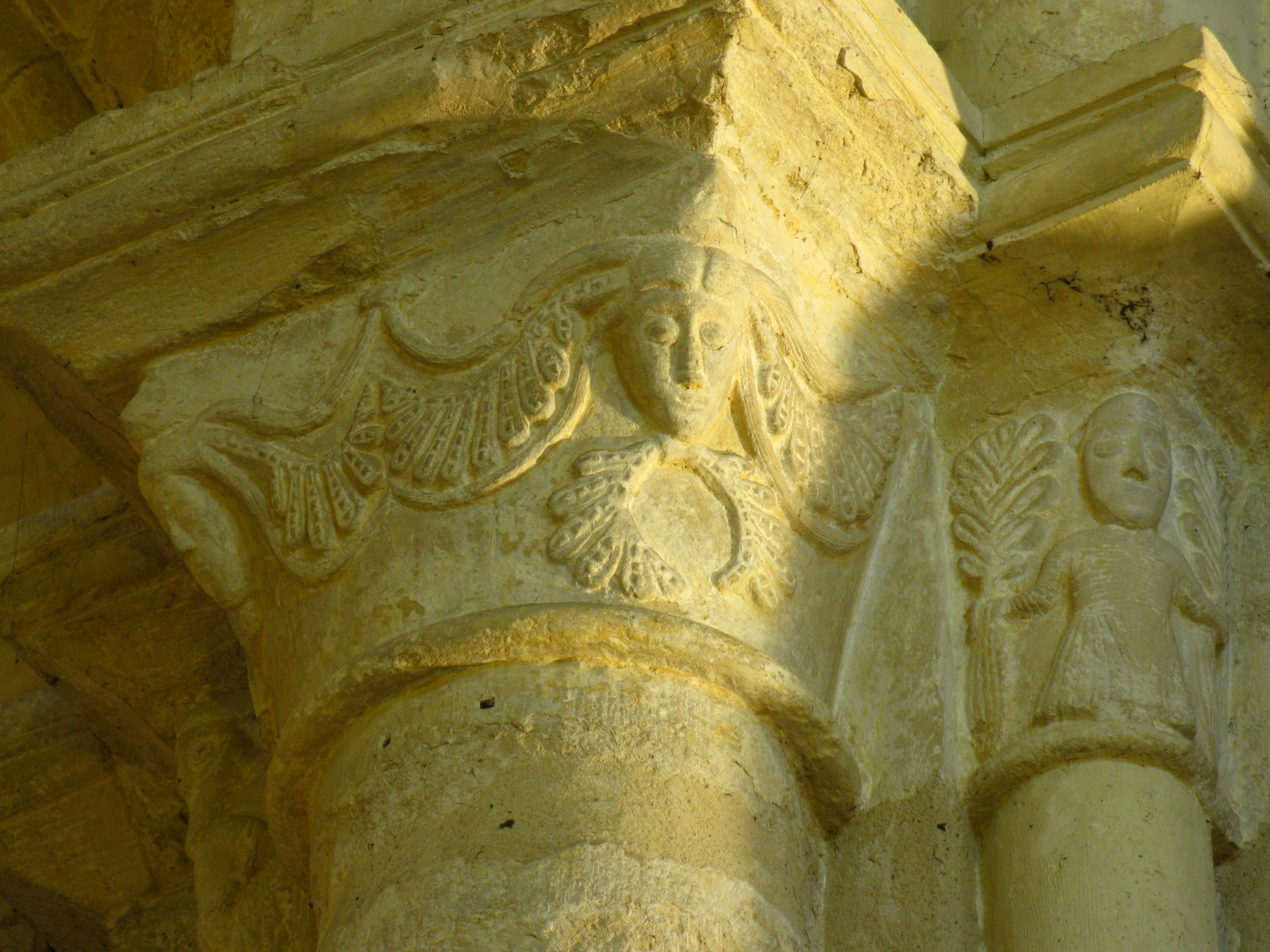
Two capitals in the church of Saint-Julien-de-Brioude

The 12th-century altar was found in the middle of the 20th century and was set back to its original place, in the choir's apse. The church also has a modern altar designed by sculptor Vincent Guiro and installed in 2008.

The stained glass of the choir's central window shows a motif of the Good Shepherd. It was designed by master glassmaker Albert Martine after a 1943 sketch by Maurice Denis.

== Bibliography ==
- Prache, Anne (1983). Île-de-France romane. Nuit des temps. Vol. 60. La Pierre-qui-Vire Abbey: Zodiaque. pp. 395–398. ISBN 978-2736901059.
- Lebeuf, Jean (1883). Histoire de la ville et de tout le diocèse de Paris : Tome cinquième. Paris: Librairie de Fechoz et Letouzey (re-print). pp. 237–241.
