= Lavoûte-Chilhac =

- Commune
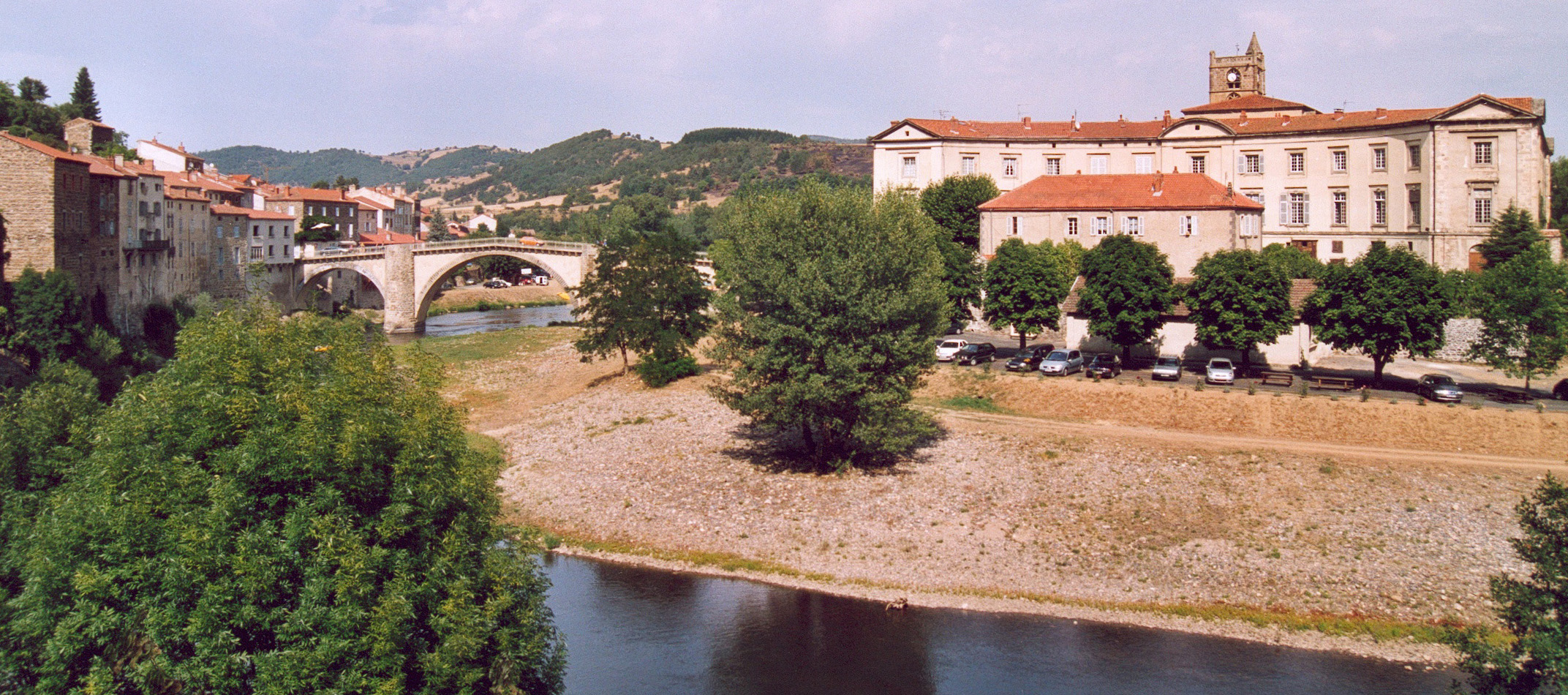

- Coat of arms
- Location of Lavoûte-Chilhac
- Location within France Location within Auvergne-Rhône-Alpes
- Coordinates: 45°08′57″N 3°24′15″E
- Country: France
- Region: Auvergne-Rhône-Alpes
- Department: Haute-Loire
- Arrondissement: Brioude
- Canton: Pays de Lafayette

Government
  - Mayor (2020–2026): Christian Dauphin
- Area^{1}: 3.61 km^{2} (1.39 sq mi)
- Elevation: 470 m (1,540 ft)
- Highest elevation: 640 m (2,100 ft)
- Lowest elevation: 447 m (1,467 ft)
- Population (2023): 254
  - Density: 70.4/km^{2} (182/sq mi)
- Time zone: UTC+01:00 (CET)
  - Summer (DST): UTC+02:00 (CEST)
- INSEE/Postal code: 43118 /43380
- ^{1} French Land Register data, which excludes lakes, ponds, glaciers > 1 km^{2} (0.386 sq mi or 247 acres) and river estuaries.

Lavoûte-Chilhac (French pronunciation: [lavut ʃijak]; Occitan: La Vòuta) is a commune in the Haute-Loire department in south-central France. It is a member of Les Plus Beaux Villages de France (The Most Beautiful Villages of France) Association.

== Geography ==
The village is located at an altitude of over 400 meters.

In the gorges of the Allier, the village of Lavoûte-Chilhac is about halfway between Langeac and Vieille-Brioude (end of the gorges of the Allier which then joins the Limagne de Brioude).

== Population ==
Historical population
Year	Pop.	±% p.a.
1968	344	—
1975	261	−3.87%
1982	272	+0.59%
1990	286	+0.63%
1999	302	+0.61%
2007	312	+0.41%
2012	294	−1.18%
2017	281	−0.90%
2023	254	−1.67%
Source: INSEE

== See also ==
- Communes of the Haute-Loire department
