= Robert de Turlande =

French monk and Roman Catholic saint

Saint Robert de Turlande O.S.B.
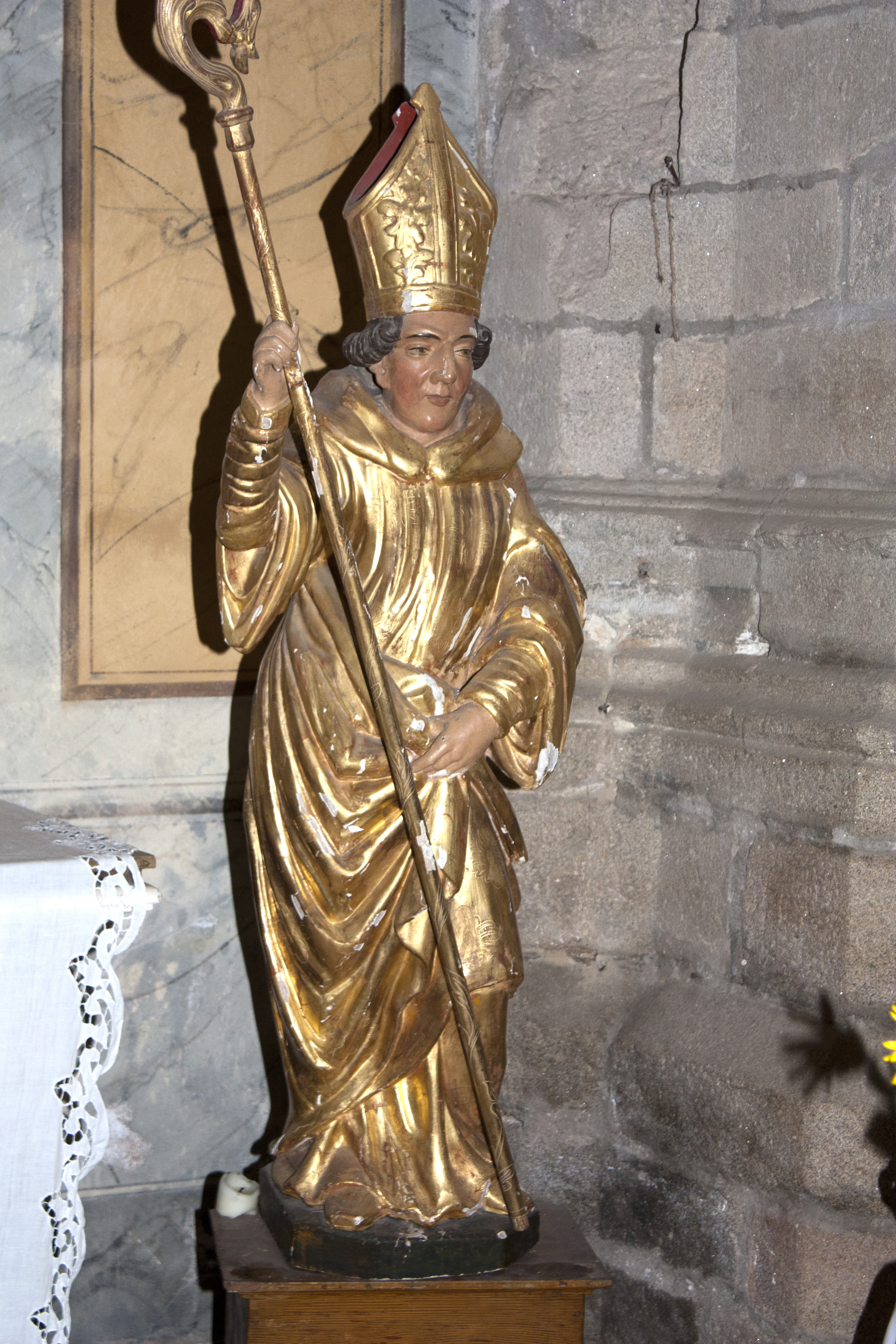
- Statue of Saint Robert de Turlande

Priest
- Born: c. 1000; Auvergne, Kingdom of France
- Died: 17 April 1067 (aged 67); Chaise-Dieu, Kingdom of France
- Venerated in: Roman Catholic Church
- Canonized: 19 September 1531, Palais des Papes, Avignon, Papal States by Pope Clement VI
- Feast: 17 April
- Attributes: Benedictine habit; Staff
- Patronage: Abbots; Hermits; Chaise-Dieu

Robert de Turlande (c. 1000 - 17 April 1067) was a French Roman Catholic priest and professed member of the Order of Saint Benedict. He was of noble stock and was also related to Saint Gerald of Aurillac. He is best known for the establishment of the Benedictine convent of La Chaise-Dieu ('Home of God') and for his total commitment to the poor.

He became a spiritual inspiration for Pope Clement VI, whose own origins in the religious life were based at that convent, Robert canonised the Benedictine abbot on 19 September 1531 in Avignon.

== Life ==
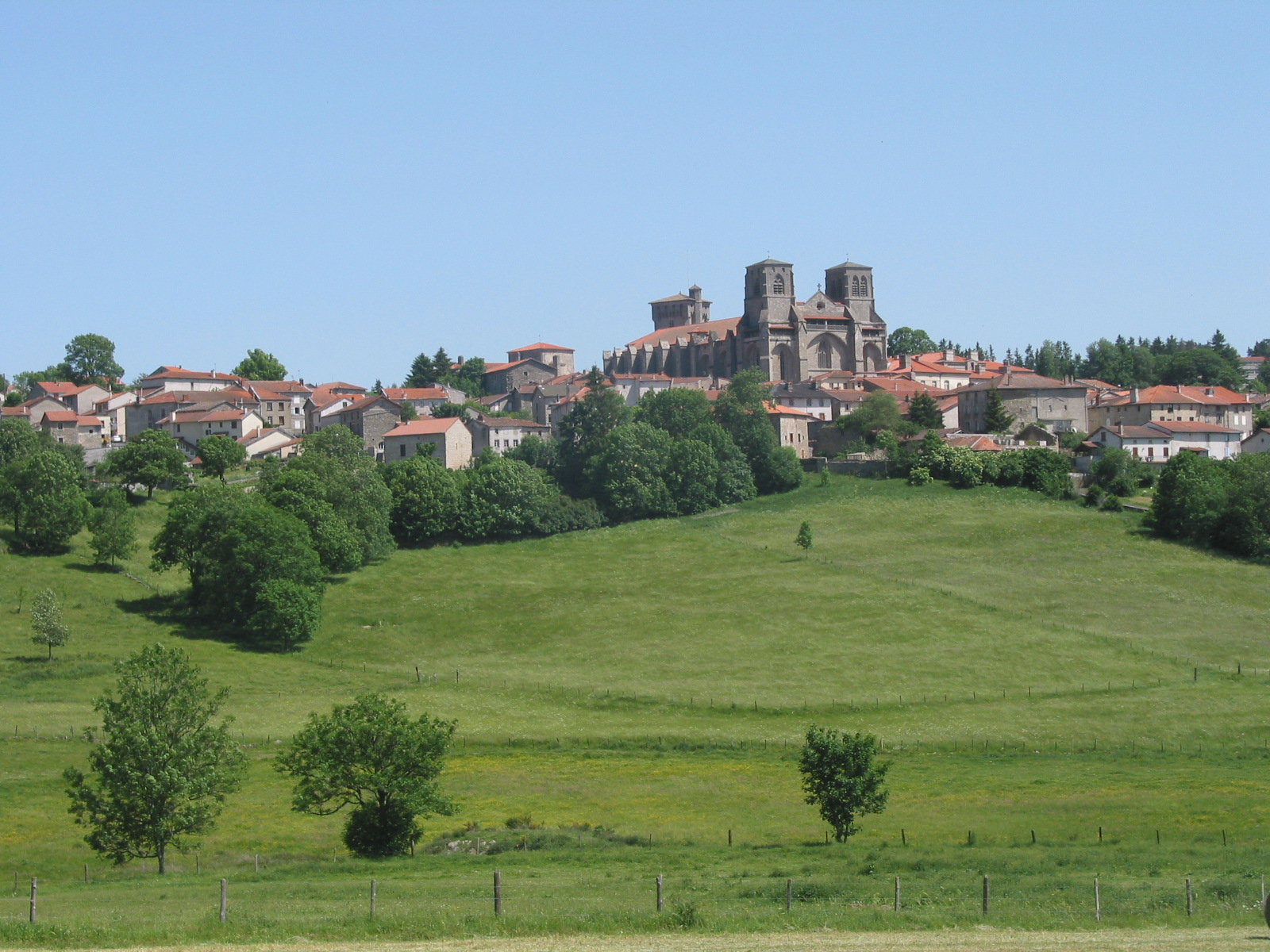
La Chaise-Dieu in France.

Robert de Turlande was born in 1000 as the last child of the nobles Géraud de Turlande and Raingarde; she was the sister of the Bishop Rencon. He was also related to Gerald of Aurillac. His mother went into labour while in the forests near the castle she lived in and so gave birth to him there; locals perceived this as a sign that the child would become a hermit.

Robert's education was overseen at the Church of Saint-Julien in Brioude, where he later became its canon after he was ordained to the priesthood in 1026. There, he founded a hospice for the poor of the region. He later became a monk at Cluny and placed himself under the direction of Odilo of Cluny.

He travelled to Rome and later Monte Cassino in the Papal States to educate himself in the rule of Benedict of Nursia who established the Benedictines. On 28 December 1043, with the knights Stephen Chaliers and Dalmas, he travelled to a vacant area of land around a ruined chapel, which was to become his future Benedictine convent.

In 1046, he and two of his companions received the permission of Pope Gregory VI to establish a hermitage and embark on a life of commitment to the poor. It was Gregory VI who suggested that the trio consider the contemplative life as a greater method of achieving their aim of providing for the poor; this prompted him to move to Auvergne. He has been credited to the construction and the restoration of around a total of 50 churches in his region.

Around 1049, he had amassed numerous followers to the extent that he had to use donations from the faithful to construct a new Benedictine convent; construction began in 1049 and concluded in 1050. The convent received the endorsement of the Bishop of Clermont before he set out for monarchial approval. He approached King Henry I and requested that he issue a decree granting protection and approval to the new convent.

Robert de Turlande died on 17 April 1067, and his funeral was scheduled for 24 April because so many people wanted to visit his remains. Hundreds of miracles were reported to have been performed through his intercession, which led to a local cultus around him. He was interred in his own convent though most of his relics would be burnt by the Huguenots. There were 300 monks at the convent at the time of his death.

== Canonization ==
The local cultus to the late hermit prompted calls for him to be proclaimed a saint of the Roman Catholic Church. On 19 September 1351, he was proclaimed a saint in a celebration that Pope Clement VI presided over in Avignon while the papal see was stationed there.

Robert served as a spiritual inspiration to the pontiff, who himself desired to be interred at La Chaise-Dieu after his own death in 1352. The pope had started his religious career there as a monk.
