= Isabelle Mège =

French model (born 1965)

Isabelle Mège (born October 31, 1965) is an amateur model and diarist. She was born in Brioude, Auvergne, and currently lives near Dijon with her Iranian-born scientist husband Alexis Bozorg Grayeli.

== Career ==
From 1986 to 2008, while working as a medical secretary, Mège persuaded 80 professional photographers to shoot her. She maintains a collection of the photographs as well as a journal of her meetings with the photographers. Her project was profiled in the New Yorker magazine in 2016.

== See also ==
- Fouad Elkoury - photographer who responded to Mège in October 2002.
