= Pierre Vigouroux =

- Born: 30 June 1983 (age 43) Brioude (Haute-Loire), France
- Height: 1.98 m (6 ft 6 in)
- Weight: 105 kg (231 lb)

Rugby union career
- Position: Lock
Amateur team(s)
| Years | Team | Apps | (Points) |
- SC Brioude
Senior career
| Years | Team | Apps | (Points) |
| 2004-2008 | Clermont | 37 | (5) |
| 2008-2010 | Paris | 34 | (0) |
| 2010-2012 | Lyon | 27 | (0) |

Pierre Vigouroux (born June 30, 1983 in Brioude, Haute-Loire) is a former French rugby union player. His position is at Lock. He played for Lyon OU in the Top 14 between 2010 and 2012. He previously played for Stade Français and ASM Clermont Auvergne.

He was selected by the French under-21 national team twice in 2003. He then represented France at the 2004 Under 21 Rugby World Championships.

Vigouroux retired in 2012 after suffering a shoulder injury in a motorcycle accident.
