= Haute-Loire's 2nd constituency =

Constituency of the National Assembly of France

2nd constituency of Haute-Loire
- inline Constituency of the National Assembly of France

- Haute-Loire's 2nd Constituency shown within Haute-Loire

- Location of Haute-Loire in France
- Deputy: Jean-Pierre Vigier; LR
- Department: Haute-Loire
- Cantons: Allègre, Auzon, Blesle, Brioude Nord, Brioude Sud, Cayres, La Chaise-Dieu, Craponne-sur-Arzon, Langeac Lavoûte-Chilhac, Loudes, Paulhaguet, Pinols, Pradelles, Le Puy Nord, Le Puy Ouest, Le Puy Sud-Ouest, Saint-Paulien, Saugues, Solignac-sur-Loire
- Registered voters: 79462

The 2nd constituency of the Haute-Loire (French: Deuxième circonscription de la Haute-Loire) is a French legislative constituency in the Haute-Loire département. Like the other 576 French constituencies, it elects one MP using a two round electoral system.

== Description ==
One of only two seats in the department, the 2nd Constituency of the Haute-Loire covers the eastern portion of the department. The constituency includes the prefecture of Le Puy-en-Velay.

The constituency has consistently elected deputies from the centre right.

== Assembly Members ==
Election	Member	Party
1988	Jean Proriol	UDF
2002	Jean Proriol	UMP
2012	Jean-Pierre Vigier	UMP
2017	Jean-Pierre Vigier	LR
2022	Jean-Pierre Vigier	LR
2024	Jean-Pierre Vigier	LR

== Election results ==
=== 2024 ===
Candidate	Party	Alliance	First round			Second round		
Candidate	Party	Alliance	Votes	%	+/–	Votes	%	+/–
Jean-Pierre Vigier	LR		21,573	38.69	-6.99	34,629	64.53	-3.82
Suzanne Maryse Denise Fourets	RN		17,885	32.08	+18.47	19,033	35.47	new
Andre Antoine Célestin Chapaveire	PS	NFP	10,898	19.55	-0.24	WITHDREW		
Patricia Pierrette Gire-Joubert	REN	ENS	4,607	8.26	-3.28			
Antoine Brebion	LO		795	1.43	+0.52			
Votes			55,758	100.00		53,662	100.00	
Valid votes			55,758	97.70	+0.18	53,662	95.43	+1.07
Blank votes			834	1.46	-0.23	1,867	3.32	-0.42
Null votes			481	0.84	+0.05	703	1.25	-0.65
Turnout			57,073	71.89	+18.66	56,232	70.83	+20.85
Abstentions			22,317	28.11	-18.66	23,160	29.17	-20.85
Registered voters			79,390			79,392		
Result			LR HOLD					

=== 2022 ===
Legislative Election 2022: Haute-Loire's 2nd constituency
Party	Candidate	Votes	%	±%
LR (UDC)	Jean-Pierre Vigier	18,850	45.68	+4.78
LFI (NUPÉS)	Azelma Sigaux	8,166	19.79	+1.2
RN	Thierry Perez	5,618	13.61	+5.32
PRV (Ensemble)	Christian Allegre	4,764	11.54	−15.91
REC	Clémence D'Aubignan	1,041	2.52	N/A
DVE	Jean-Philippe Clement	856	2.07	N/A
Others	N/A	1,971	-	−
Turnout		41,266	53.23	−0.14
2nd round result
LR (UDC)	Jean-Pierre Vigier	25,621	68.35	+4.46
LFI (NUPÉS)	Azelma Sigaux	11,862	31.65	N/A
Turnout		37,483	49.98	+1.48
LR hold				

=== 2017 ===
Candidate	Label	First round		Second round	
Candidate	Label	Votes	%	Votes	%
Jean-Pierre Vigier	LR	16,958	40.90	22,306	63.89
Pierre Eteocle	REM	11,382	27.45	12,606	36.11
Lionel Bouton	FI	4,759	11.48		
Aurore Arnaud	FN	3,437	8.29		
Josiane Mialon	PS	1,625	3.92		
Marie-Laure Busselot	ECO	1,323	3.19		
Michelle Chaumet	PCF	785	1.89		
Alexis Monjauze	DVD	414	1.00		
Renaud Mauchet	EXD	312	0.75		
Françoise Sarret	DIV	253	0.61		
Georges Fridlender	EXG	213	0.51		
Votes		41,461	100.00	34,912	100.00
Valid votes		41,461	97.77	34,912	90.59
Blank votes		641	1.51	2,507	6.51
Null votes		306	0.72	1,120	2.91
Turnout		42,408	53.37	38,539	48.50
Abstentions		37,055	46.63	40,923	51.50
Registered voters		79,463		79,462	
Source: Ministry of the Interior

=== 2012 ===
2012 legislative election in Haute-Loire's 2nd constituency
Candidate	Party	First round		Second round	
Candidate	Party	Votes	%	Votes	%
Jean-Pierre Vigier	UMP	18,351	38.19%	24,698	51.52%
André Chapaveire	PS	17,229	35.86%	23,244	48.48%
Maria Raia	FN	4,950	10.30%		
Michelle Chaumet	FG	3,332	6.93%		
Celline Gacon	EELV	1,799	3.74%		
Alexis Monjauze		1,522	3.17%		
Johanna Seytre	??	514	1.07%		
Annie Boubault	LO	322	0.67%		
William Theaux	PP	29	0.06%		
Valid votes		48,048	97.50%	47,942	96.18%
Spoilt and null votes		1,231	2.50%	1,906	3.82%
Votes cast / turnout		49,279	61.37%	49,848	62.01%
Abstentions		31,025	38.63%	30,541	37.99%
Registered voters		80,304	100.00%	80,389	100.00%

=== 2007 ===
Legislative Election 2007: Haute-Loire's 2nd constituency
Party	Candidate	Votes	%	±%
UMP	Jean Proriol	17,793	36.03	
PS	André Chapaveire	10,904	22.08	
DIV	Laurent Duplomb	7,140	14.46	
MoDem	Jean-Pierre Vigier	5,396	10.93	
PCF	Christiane Laidouni	1,512	3.06	
LV	Pierre Pommarel	1,494	3.03	
EXG	François Boudet	1,434	2.90	
FN	Jacqueline Largeteau	1,410	2.86	
Others	N/A	2,300		
Turnout		50,873	63.29	
2nd round result
UMP	Jean Proriol	24,389	53.63	
PS	André Chapaveire	21,090	46.37	
Turnout		48,987	60.95	
UMP hold				

=== 2002 ===
Legislative Election 2002: Haute-Loire's 2nd constituency
Party	Candidate	Votes	%	±%
UMP	Jean Proriol	21,603	41.83	
PS	Arlette Arnaud-Landau	15,236	29.50	
DIV	Jean-Pierre Vigier	6,312	12.22	
FN	Hélène Le Guezenne	4,023	7.79	
Others	N/A	4,473		
Turnout		53,118	67.32	
2nd round result
UMP	Jean Proriol	27,030	57.91	
PS	Arlette Arnaud-Landau	19,643	42.09	
Turnout		49,016	62.21	
UMP gain from PPDF				

=== 1997 ===
Legislative Election 1997: Haute-Loire's 2nd constituency
Party	Candidate	Votes	%	±%
PPDF (UDF)	Jean Proriol	21,172	41.95	
PS	André Roure	14,617	28.96	
FN	Helène Le Guezennec	5,301	10.50	
PCF	Evelyne Valentin	3,926	7.78	
LV	Pierre Pommarel	3,635	7.20	
LDI	Serge-Pierre Mondani	1,823	3.61	
Turnout		54,525	70.63	
2nd round result
PPDF (UDF)	Jean Proriol	27,854	52.58	
PS	André Roure	25,117	47.42	
Turnout		56,532	73.23	
PPDF hold				
