= Gerald of Aurillac =

French saint

Saint Gerald of Aurillac
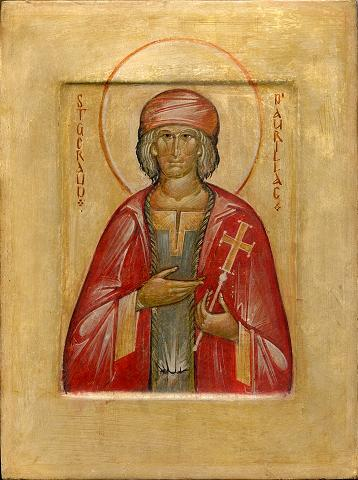
- Saint Gerald of Aurillac

Confessor
- Born: c. 855; Aurillac
- Died: c. 909; Cenezac
- Venerated in: Catholic Church; Eastern Orthodox Church
- Major shrine: Aurillac
- Feast: October 13
- Patronage: bachelors, counts, disabled people, Upper Auvergne

Gerald of Aurillac (or Saint Gerald) (c. 855 – c. 909) is a French saint of the Roman Catholic Church, also recognized by other religious denominations of Christianity.

== Life ==
Gerald was born into the Gallo-Roman nobility, counting Cesarius of Arles among his forebears, though the title "Count of Aurillac" was not held by his father, to whose estates he succeeded, and was assumed by him in later life. He was related to Robert de Turlande.

The details of his life known today come primarily from The Life of St. Gerald of Aurillac (c. 930–931) written by Odo of Cluny. Writing twenty years after the event, Abbot Odo of Cluny described how William, duke of Aquitaine, had entreated Gerald to abandon the militia regia, the feudal service performed directly to the king and pay homage to himself, "for the sake of love". Gerald resisted, having recently assumed the title of comes and doubtless preferring to owe his fealty to the more distant liege, the king at Paris.

According to Odo, Gerald suffered an illness as a child, sufficient in duration to advance his reading, and may have been disfigured by acne. In later life he was to suffer blindness. He seriously considered joining a religious order, but was persuaded against it by his friend Geusbert, Bishop of Rodez, on the grounds that with his social position he could do more good by remaining in the world as a layman. Nevertheless, secretly tonsured under his habitual cap, he consecrated his life in service to God, gave away his possessions, took a personal vow of chastity and prayed the breviary each day.

He founded a church and abbey on his estate of Aurillac, where he was buried after dying at Cezeinac/Cézerniac, name of an unclearly identified locality —possibly Cézens or Saint-Cirgues today—, on a Friday 13 October, probably in 909. His memorial feast day is October 13. The validation of his local cult by Odo of Cluny served to establish his wider veneration. Saint Gerald, considered by his Church and his followers as a great example of a celibate Christian aristocrat, is the patron saint of counts and bachelors. Because of his poor health and blindness, more emphasized in his developing cult than in Odo's Life, he is also the patron saint of the disabled, handicapped, and physically challenged. He also became the patron saint of Upper Auvergne.
