= Pachade =

Type of French pancake

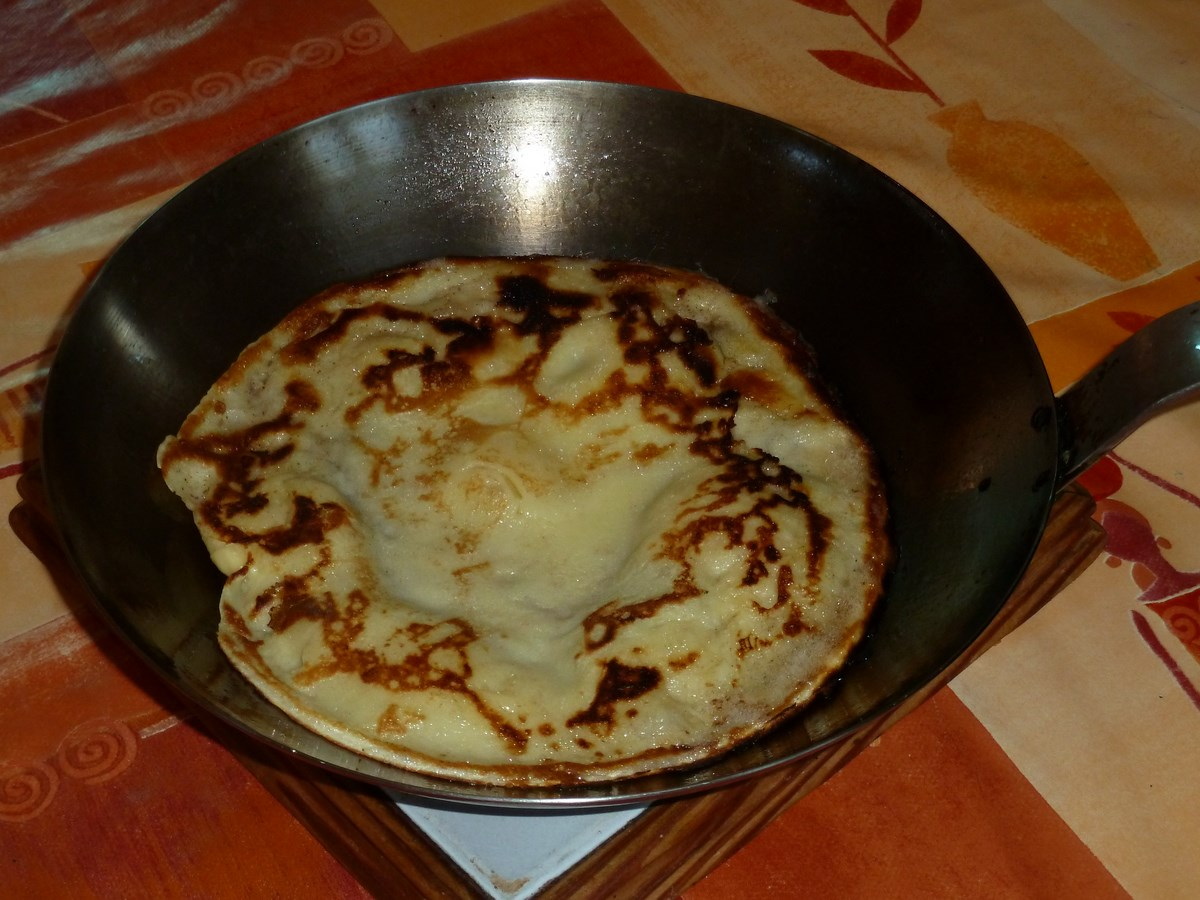
- Type: Pancake
- Place of origin: France
- Region or state: Auvergne
- Main ingredients: Egg, wheat flour, fruits

A pachade, also known as a farinette, is a thick and crispy pancake which is traditionally eaten in the French region of Auvergne.

== Recipe ==
Pachade is prepared like a pancake. The recipe includes eggs, several tablespoons of wheat flour, salt and milk, mixed into a paste thicker than a typical pancake batter. Pachade may be sweet or savoury.

== Bibliography ==
- Marie-Aimée Méraville, Contes populaires de l'Auvergne, 1982, p.295
