= Petit salé =

Salted pork

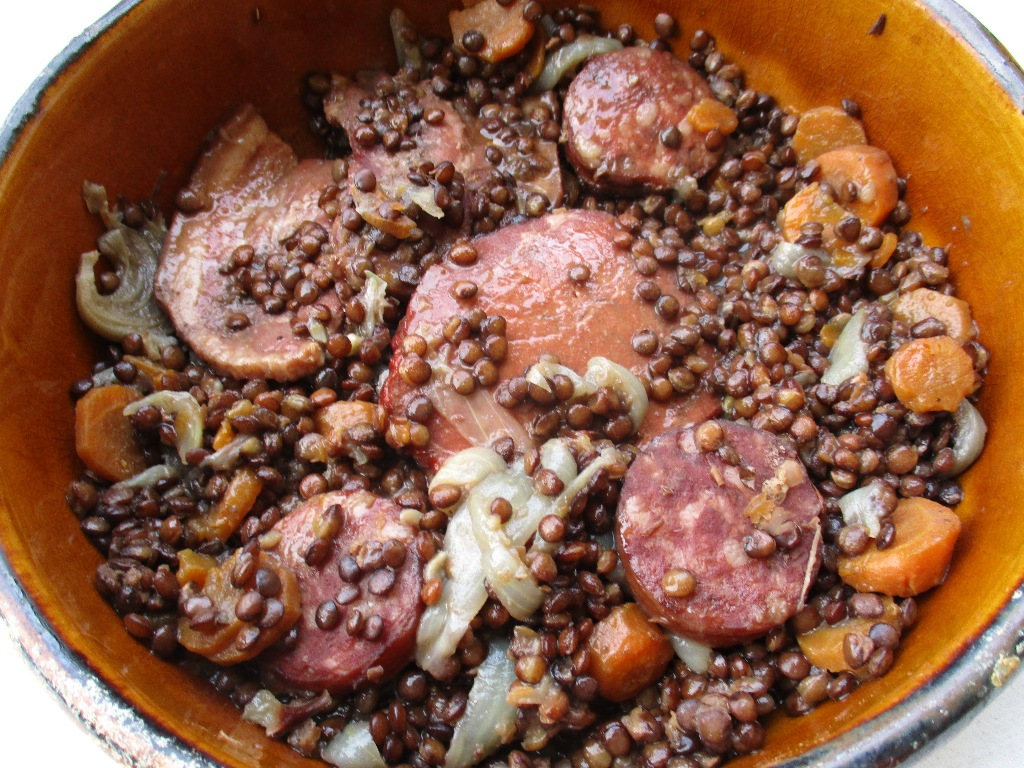
Petit salé aux lentilles

Petit salé is salted pork, usually produced according to a French method of immersing cuts of pork for up to two days in brine.

Petit salé is often used as an abbreviation for the recipe 'petit salé aux lentilles' (lit. petit salé with lentils), a dish containing pork, vegetables and lentils.

The term refers to the smaller pieces of pork, offcuts from the large joints, brined together in a barrel rather than being injected as the large joints are. Nicholas Freeling, in his cookbook, describes it as “The brine-barrel pieces, generally cheap corners, are called in France ‘petit-salé’.” It is not connected with the saltiness of the brine.
