= Marolles-en-Brie, Val-de-Marne =

Marolles-en-Brie
- Commune
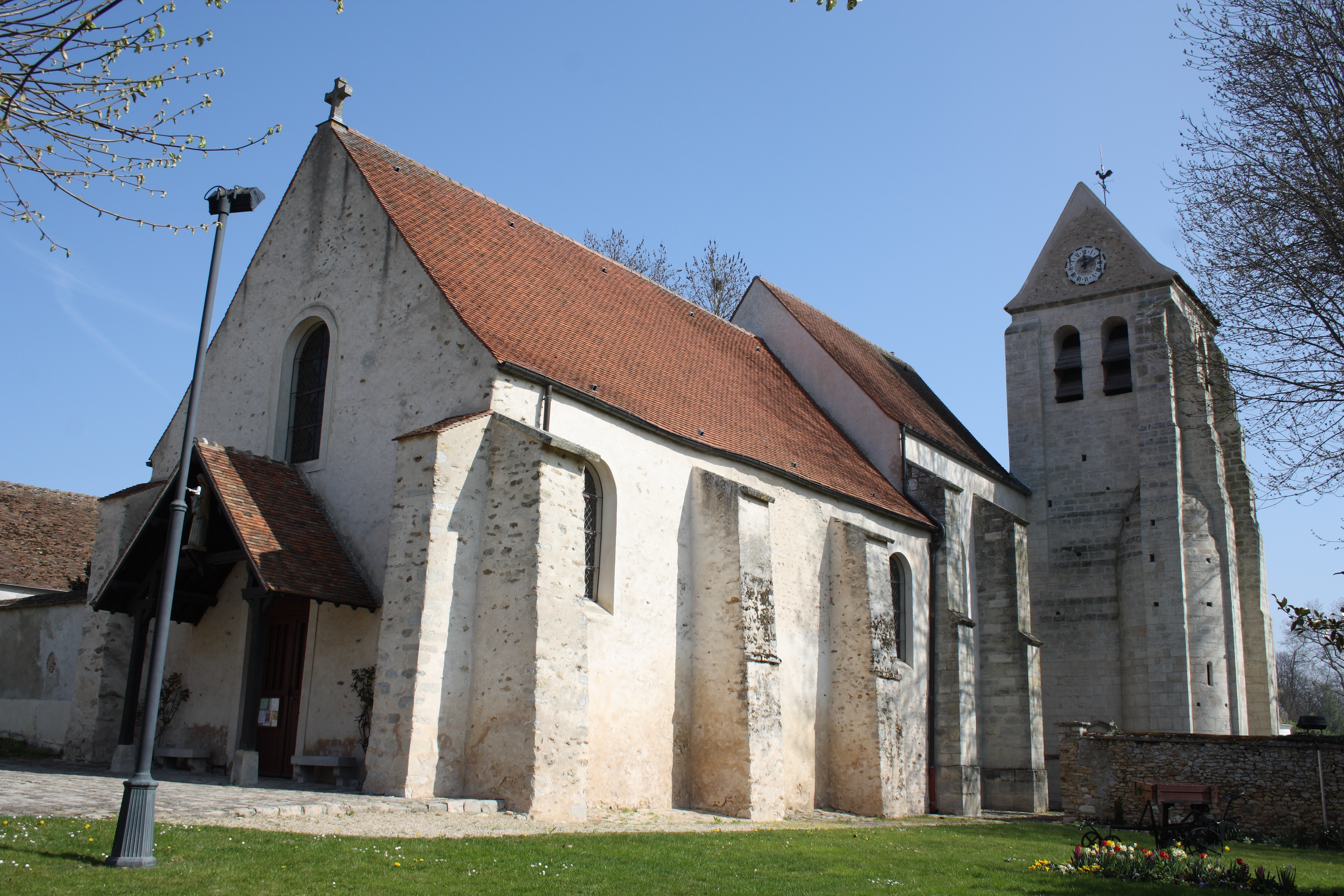
- The church of Saint-Julien-de-Brioude

- Location (in red) within Paris inner suburbs
- Location of Marolles-en-Brie
- Location within France Location within Île-de-France (region)
- Coordinates: 48°43′57″N 2°33′03″E
- Country: France
- Region: Île-de-France
- Department: Val-de-Marne
- Arrondissement: Créteil
- Canton: Plateau briard
- Intercommunality: Grand Paris

Government
  - Mayor (2026–32): Alphonse Boye
- Area^{1}: 4.59 km^{2} (1.77 sq mi)
- Highest elevation: 102 m (335 ft)
- Lowest elevation: 57 m (187 ft)
- Population (2023): 4,781
  - Density: 1,040/km^{2} (2,700/sq mi)
- Time zone: UTC+01:00 (CET)
  - Summer (DST): UTC+02:00 (CEST)
- INSEE/Postal code: 94048 /94440
- ^{1} French Land Register data, which excludes lakes, ponds, glaciers > 1 km^{2} (0.386 sq mi or 247 acres) and river estuaries.

Marolles-en-Brie (French pronunciation: [maʁɔl ɑ̃ bʁi], literally Marolles in Brie) is a commune in the Val-de-Marne department, in the southeastern suburbs of Paris, France. It is located 20.2 km (12.6 mi) from the center of Paris.

== Toponymy ==
The name Marolles has several theories regarding its origin. One theory derives it from the Latin materia, meaning 'timber'. Another derives it from the Celtic marasialo, meaning 'large clearing'. It could perhaps derive from the Latin for 'fief of the marshes', or marroliis, meaning 'sacred land of the marsh'.

== Transport ==
Marolles-en-Brie is served by no station of the Paris Métro, RER, or suburban rail network. The closest station to Marolles-en-Brie is Boissy-Saint-Léger station on Paris RER line A. This station is located in the neighboring commune of Boissy-Saint-Léger, 4 km (2.5 mi) from the town center of Marolles-en-Brie. There is a line ( the line 4012 ) of buses which links the Boissy Saint-Léger's RER station and Marolles-en-Brie.

== Population ==
Historical population
Year	Pop.	±% p.a.
1968	493	—
1975	501	+0.23%
1982	1,501	+16.97%
1990	4,606	+15.05%
1999	5,191	+1.34%
2007	5,073	−0.29%
2012	4,861	−0.85%
2017	4,847	−0.06%
2023	4,781	−0.23%
Source: INSEE

== Education ==
The primary schools in the commune are École maternelle des Buissons (preschool/nursery school), École élémentaire des Buissons, and École maternelle et élémentaire de la Forêt (combined preschool and elementary). Students may attend Collège Georges Brassens (junior high school) in Santeny and Lycée Guillaume Budé in Limeil-Brévannes.

== See also ==
- Communes of the Val-de-Marne department
- Church of Saint-Julien-de-Brioude, Marolles-en-Brie
