= Jean Proriol =

French politician (born 1934)

Jean Proriol (born 25 November 1934) is a French politician of the Union for a Popular Movement (UMP), currently serving in the National Assembly from the second district of Haute-Loire (Le Puy-Brioude).

Proriol was born in Beauzac, Haute-Loire. He has been the Mayor of Beauzac since October 1962, and has been President of the Departmental Association of Mayors of Haute-Loire since 1979. He also became a member of the General Council of Haute-Loire in October 1962, where he served until March 1992; from March 1985 to March 1992, he was Vice-President of the General Council.

From October 1974 to March 1978, Proriol was a member of the French Senatefrom Haute-Loire. In the March 1978 legislative election, he was elected to the National Assembly, and he has been re-elected in every election since then. He was Secretary of the National Assembly from April 1993 to April 1997 and from June 2002 to June 2007.

He has been a member of the Regional Council of Auvergne since March 1992. He was previously Vice-President of the Regional Council from March 1986 to June 1988, and he was First Vice-President in charge of economic development from March 1992 to March 2004.
