= Julian of Brioude =

Martyr and saint

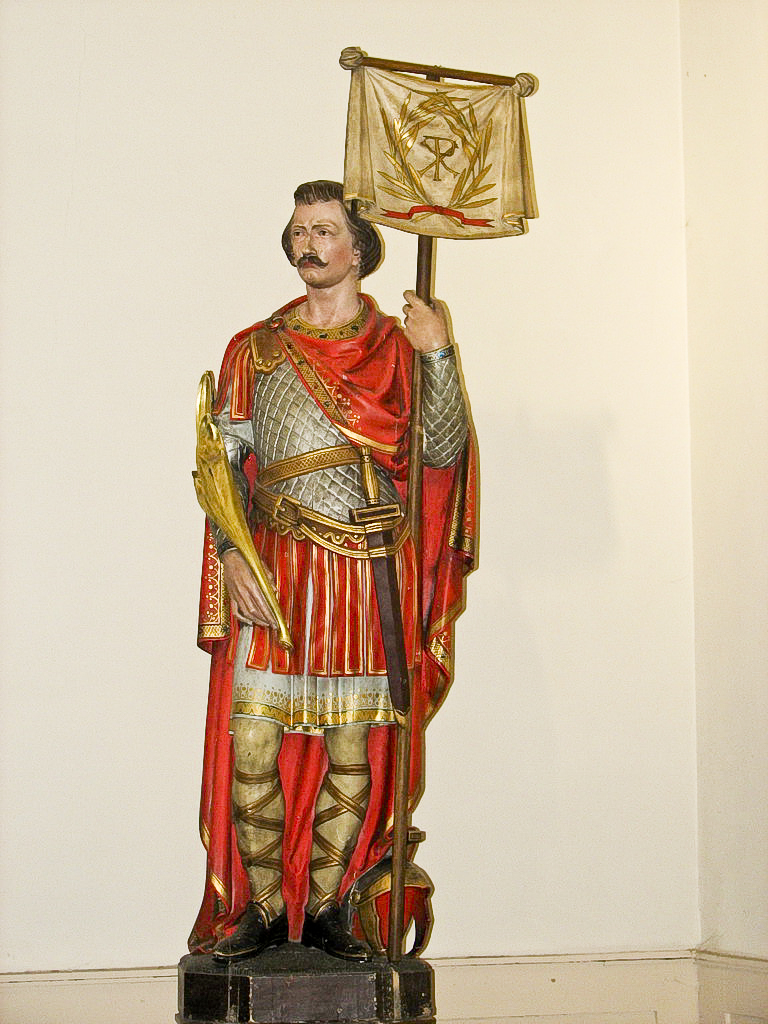
Saint Julian of Brioude, Ath.

Saint Julian of Brioude (†304) was a legendary martyr and saint from the Auvergne region of France. Although the main focus of his cultus was in the small village of Brioude, he was originally from the city of Vienne, and also associated with Clermont. He was most famous through his association with an aristocratic family of bishops of the time, his most notable proponents being St. Gallus of Clermont and St. Gregory of Tours (the latter best known for his Ten Books of Histories). Gregory wrote a vita of Julian, but his attempts to expand the saint's cult from the Auvergne to Touraine and Aquitaine were unsuccessful, and Julian is now only remembered through his basilica in the town of Brioude itself.

== Life and martyrdom ==
Little is known of the life of St. Julian. The persecution in Vienne, under the auspices of the Governor Crispinus (although this is disputed) at the time forced him to leave the town, as advised by his friend and fellow saint, the Tribune Ferréol. He hid in the house of a poor woman within the region of Clermont, but upon hearing that he was sought after by the persecutors, he revealed himself, and presented himself for execution. Having decapitated the saint, his executioners washed the head in a nearby spring and took it to Vienne, leaving the body to be buried in Brioude by two old men, who received an invigorating miracle that made them feel young again thereafter.

== Miracles ==
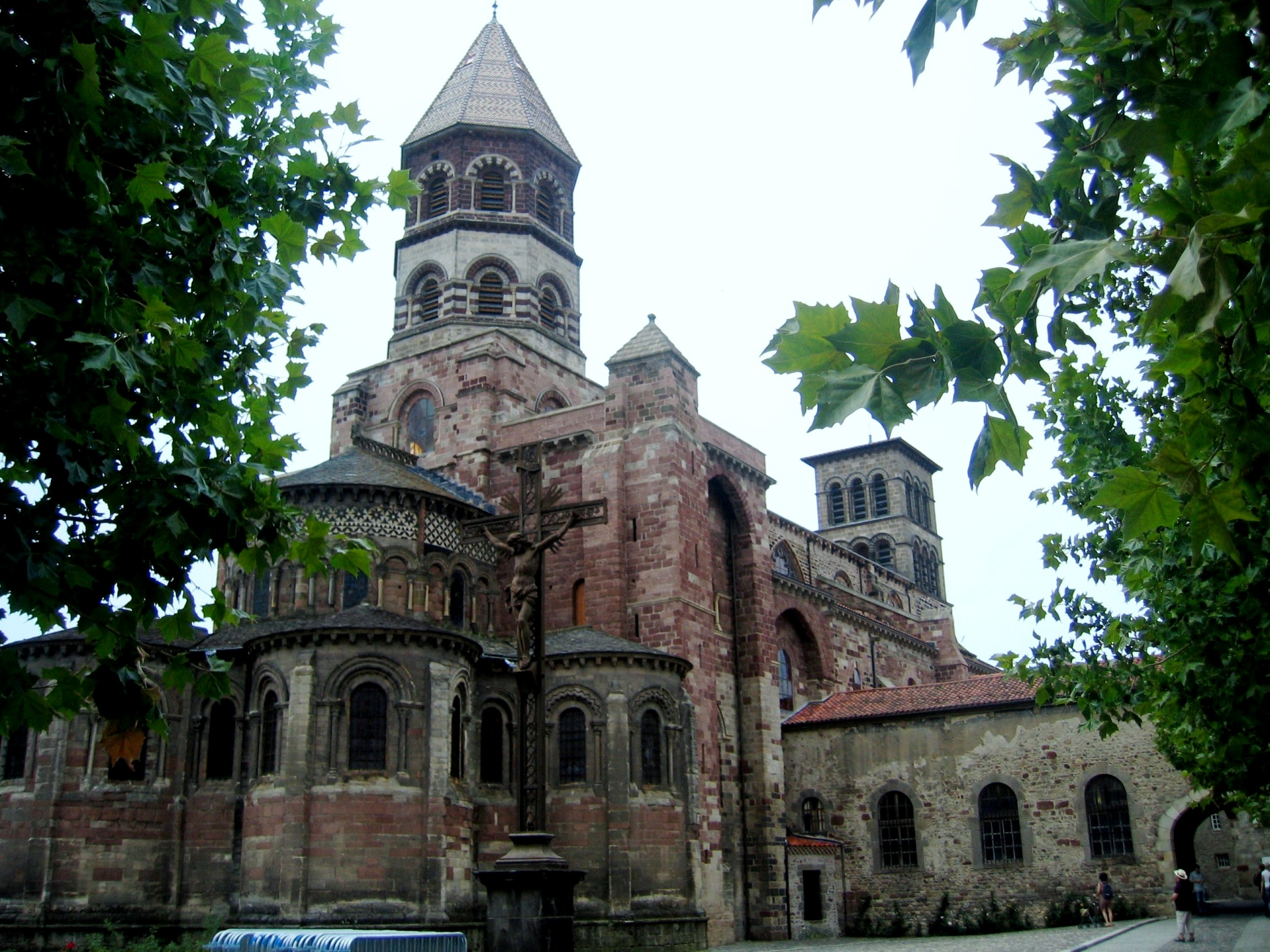
Basilique Saint-Julien de Brioude

This was simply the first of a series of reputed miracles, healing several people, including Gregory's brother of various afflictions, and punishing the wicked, especially perjurers.

In 543 Bishop Gallus instituted rogations, and the people of Clermont processed to the church of St. Julian at Brioude in order to seek his intercession against the plague that beset their city.

The instigation of rogations by Bishop Gall, and the elevation of his nephew, Gregory to the Bishopric of Tours evidently influenced the attempt to take what was essentially a regional cult to which the Bishops felt indebted, and to increase its influence. As Julian's relics were redistributed, his cult spread rapidly, to the East, to Rheims, to Tours, and to the monastery of Limoges. Gregory mentions a church in Paris dedicated under the invocation of the holy martyr near the bridge called the Petit Pont.

== Veneration ==
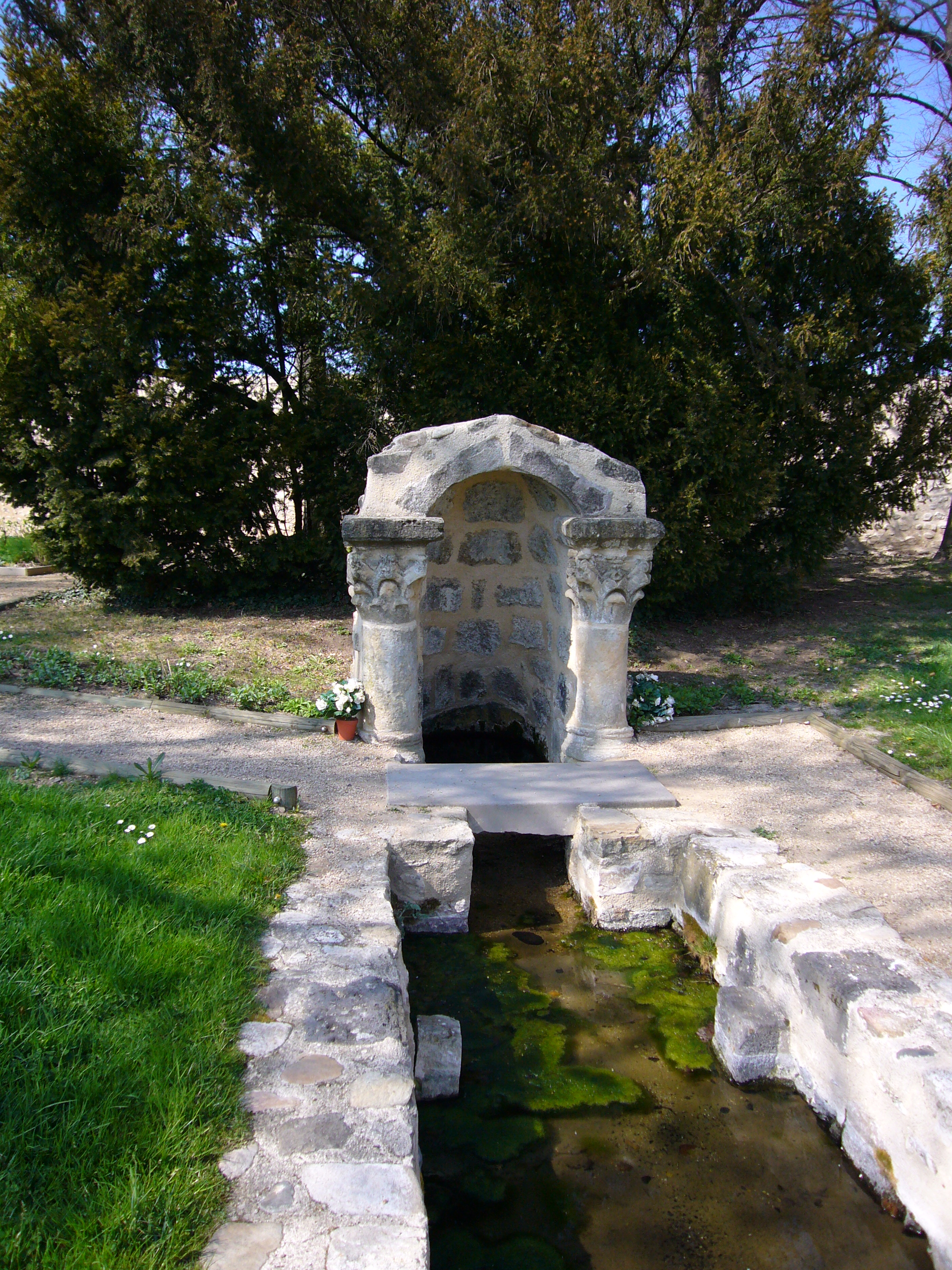
La Fontaine St-Julien

A church was built over his tomb which later became the Basilica of Saint-Julien de Brioude, the largest Romanesque in Auvergne. The feast of Saint Julian, celebrated in Brioude on 28 August, drew such crowds to the saint's relics that in the mid-11th century the chapter was obliged to build a hostel to care for the indigent pilgrim and the sick.

Odilo of Cluny studied at the seminary of St. Julien in Brioude. Saint Julien appears in a fifteenth century Book of hours.

Very early on the site of Julian's death also became a place of pilgrimage, and a small shrine was erected over the spring. In the Miracles of Julian, Gregory of Tours tells of numerous instances of people cured by drinking water from the fountain. A mass is still celebrated near the fountain, on the feast day of the Saint, during the patronal feast of the city.

St. Julian's cult survived until at least the 13th century, but was confined to Brioude once more. His legacy survives now only in the high medieval Basilica (erected c. 1100-1400), and the miracle stories written by Gregory of Tours.
