= Langeac =

- Commune
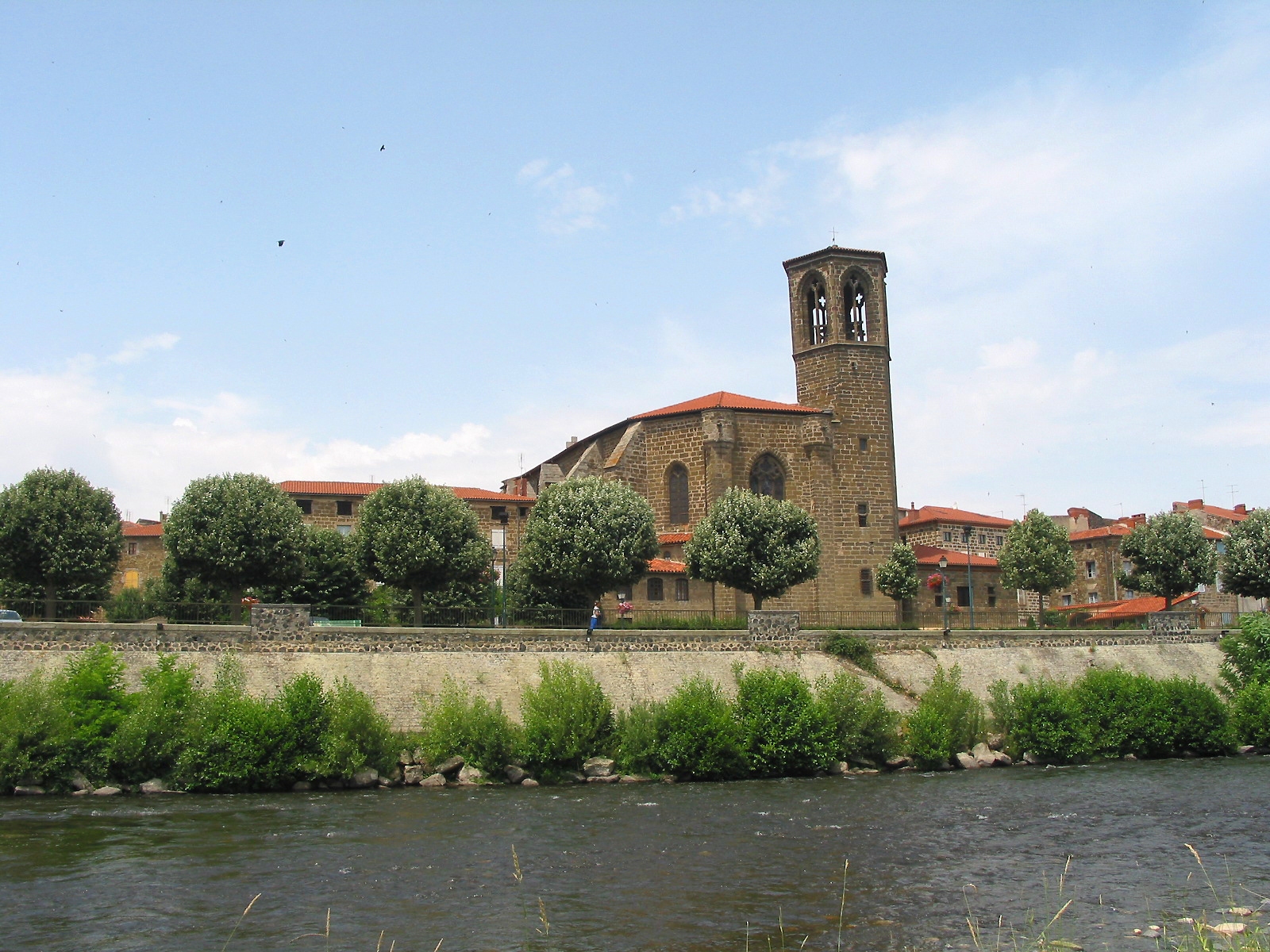
- The river Allier and the Saint Gal Collegiate church.

- Flag Coat of arms
- Location of Langeac
- Location within France Location within Auvergne-Rhône-Alpes
- Coordinates: 45°06′04″N 3°29′42″E
- Country: France
- Region: Auvergne-Rhône-Alpes
- Department: Haute-Loire
- Arrondissement: Brioude
- Canton: Gorges de l'Allier-Gévaudan

Government
  - Mayor (2020–2026): Gérard Beaud
- Area^{1}: 33.94 km^{2} (13.10 sq mi)
- Highest elevation: 951 m (3,120 ft)
- Lowest elevation: 488 m (1,601 ft)
- Population (2023): 3,499
  - Density: 103.1/km^{2} (267.0/sq mi)
- Time zone: UTC+01:00 (CET)
  - Summer (DST): UTC+02:00 (CEST)
- INSEE/Postal code: 43112 /43300
- ^{1} French Land Register data, which excludes lakes, ponds, glaciers > 1 km^{2} (0.386 sq mi or 247 acres) and river estuaries.

Langeac (French pronunciation: [lɑ̃ʒak]; Occitan: Lanjac) is a commune in the Haute-Loire department in south-central France. It is located about 30 km west of Le Puy-en-Velay, and about 100 km southwest of Lyon.

== Population ==
Historical population

Year	Pop.	±% p.a.
1793	1,554	—
1821	1,983	+0.87%
1846	3,207	+1.94%
1872	3,773	+0.63%
1901	4,574	+0.67%
1926	4,276	−0.27%
1946	5,225	+1.01%
1962	4,826	−0.50%
1968	4,934	+0.37%

Year	Pop.	±% p.a.
1975	4,853	−0.24%
1982	4,609	−0.73%
1990	4,195	−1.17%
1999	4,070	−0.34%
2007	3,943	−0.40%
2012	3,906	−0.19%
2017	3,662	−1.28%
2023	3,499	−0.76%

Source: EHESS and INSEE (1968-2023)

== Monuments ==
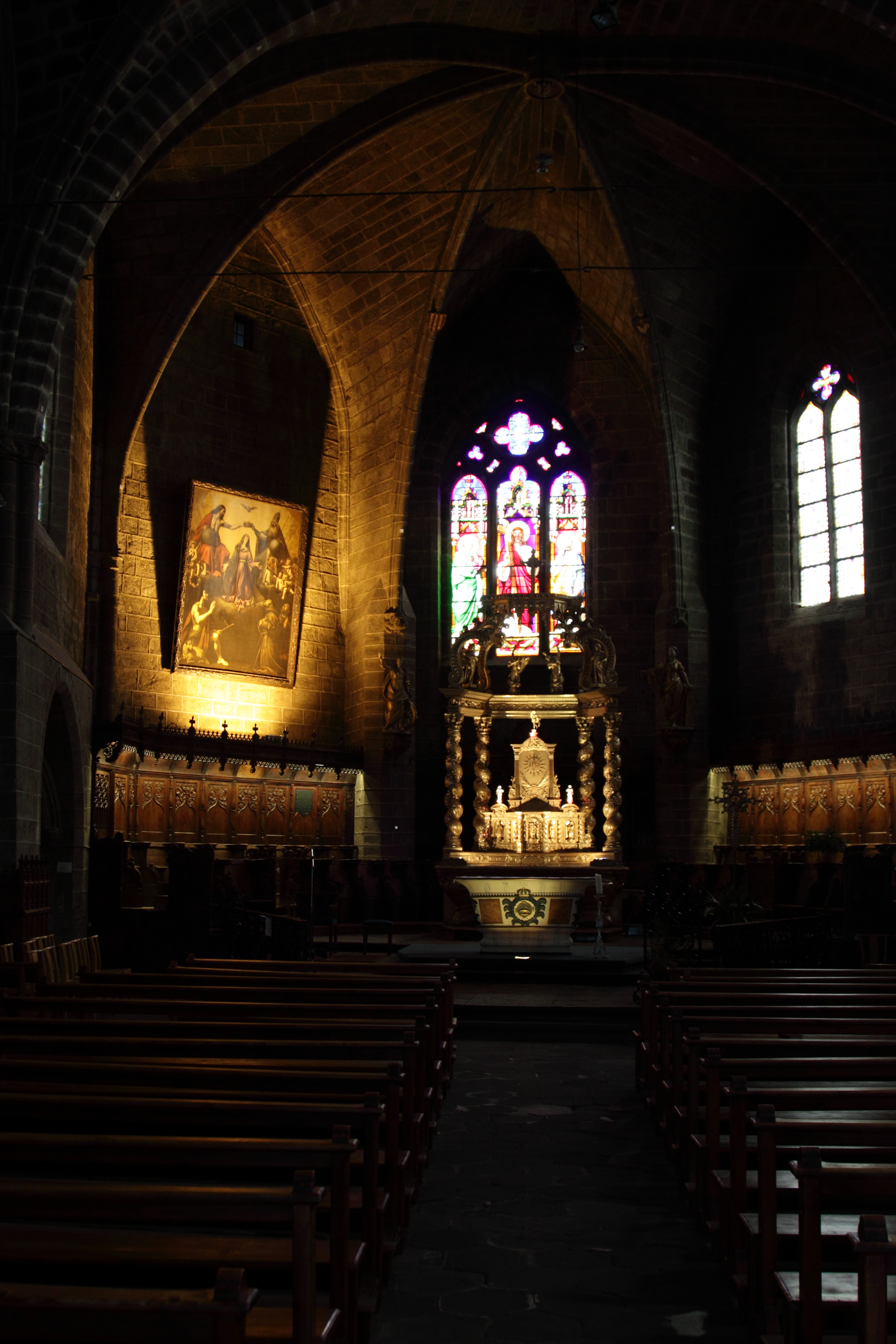
church interior

- Church of Saint-Gal

== See also ==
- Communes of the Haute-Loire department
