= Basilica of Saint-Julian, Brioude =

Historical basilica in Haute-Loire, France

Basilica of Saint-Julian
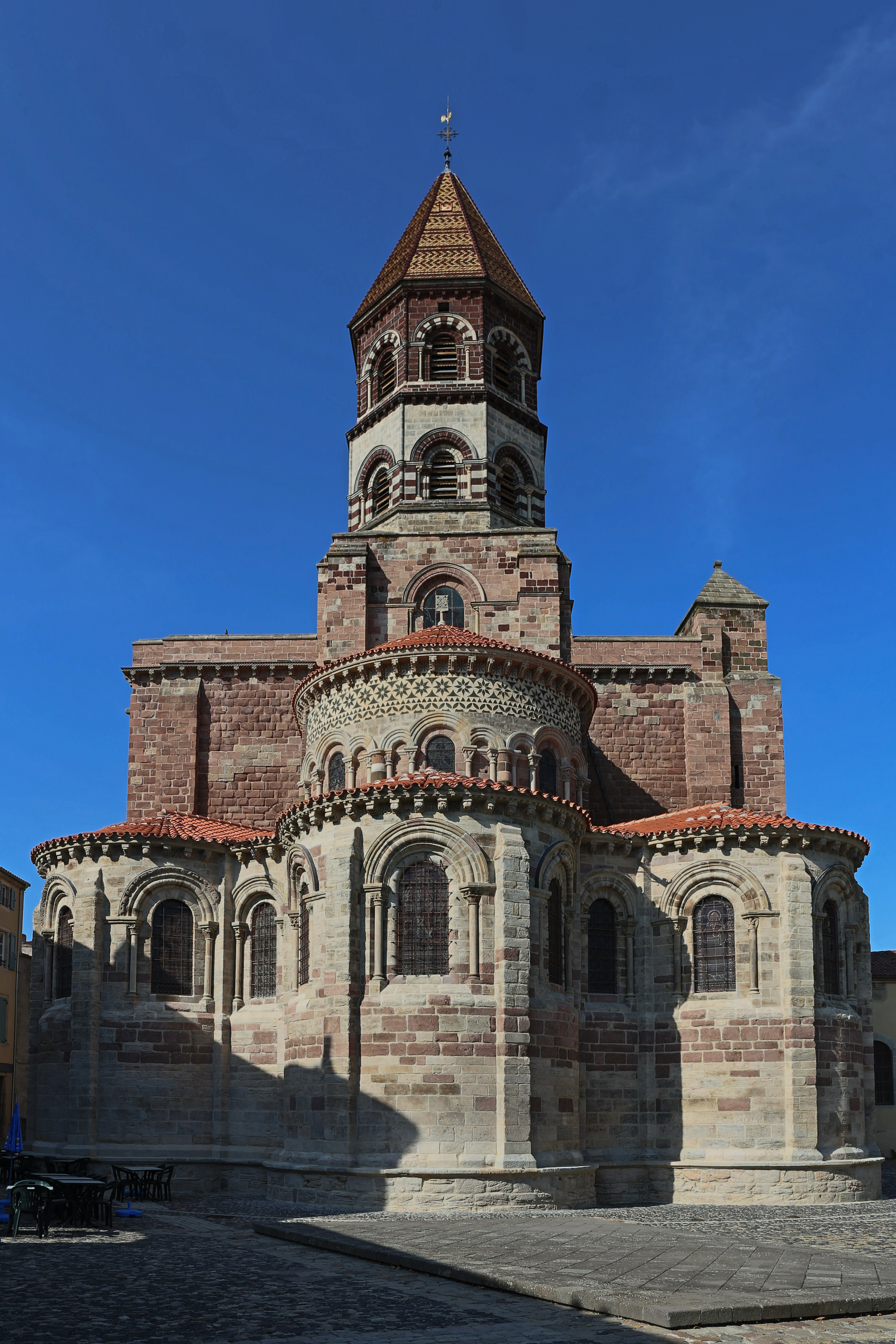

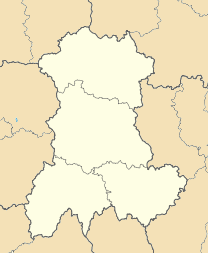
- Location within Auvergne-Rhône-Alpes Location within Auvergne Location within France

Religion
- Affiliation: Catholicism
- Province: Auvergne
- Region: Haute-Loire
- Patron: Saint Julian

Location
- Country: France
- Interactive map of Basilica of Saint-Julian
- Administration: Auvergne-Rhône-Alpes
- Coordinates: 45.2936°N 3.3844°E

Architecture
- Style: Romanesque art

The Basilica of Saint-Julian of Brioude is a basilica of the Auvergne Romanesque style located in the territory of the French commune of Brioude, in the department of Haute-Loire in the Auvergne-Rhône-Alpes region. It is classified as a historic monument, and is one of only a small number of churches in France, excluding cathedrals, to have the top three-star ranking from Michelin.

== Location ==
The Basilica of Saint-Julian is located at the southern edge of the former Diocese of Clermont, in the municipality of Brioude, in the French department of Haute-Loire.

== History ==
The first sanctuary dedicated to Saint Julian dates back to the late 4th century. It was built on the presumed tomb of the saint by a Spanish lady, as a token of gratitude for the fulfillment of her vow. Gregory of Tours reports that the saint's fame spread, attracting pilgrims. A first church was then built. The Duke Victorius, the Visigothic governor of Auvergne, adorned it with marble columns from ancient monuments; the remains of fluted columns found today in the crypt may be part of them. A clergy was established to celebrate worship and welcome the faithful: Gregory of Tours mentions in his writings the existence of a monastery and monks.

The construction of the Romanesque church dates back to the first quarter of the 12th century. It was favored by the development of the town of Brioude, which became a place of pilgrimage and a stop on the routes to Santiago de Compostela, Rome, and Jerusalem. A militia was allegedly established to guard the saint's tomb, later replaced by a college of canons.

The chapter then sought to break free from the control of the Counts of Auvergne. Pope Urban II, who came to preach the First Crusade in Clermont in 1095, placed Saint-Julian under his direct authority. His successor, Paschal II, confirmed the chapter's right to appoint its abbot and provost. King Louis VII also asserted that the chapter depended on him. Dissensions arose within the chapter itself, reflecting the rivalry between the families of Mercœur and Auvergne. In 1223, after the incorporation of Auvergne into the royal domain, the chapter bought back from the Counts of Auvergne their feudal rights over Brioude. The chapter of Saint-Julian maintained its control over Brioude until the Revolution, which led to its dissolution. The church, reassigned for parish use in 1794, saw one of its bell towers demolished and the other decapitated.

== Heritage ==
The largest Romanesque church in the Auvergne, St.Julian's basilica dates essentially from the 12th and 13th centuries. On the outside, the remarkable apse, with its five radiating chapels, is finely decorated with polychrome stonework, and carved capitals and corbels. Inside the basilica, the most distinctive feature is the unique 16th century mosaic floor extending over the full length and breadth of the nave. In the middle of the transept, in front of the choir, a Carolingian-era mosaic floor, using smaller stones, dates back to an earlier pre-Romanesque edifice. The crypt below the altar contains the relics of Saint Julian, who was martyred on the spot. In the gallery at the western end of the southern aisle, St. Michael's chapel, visible from below, has one of the best-preserved ensembles of 13th century Byzantine-style century frescoes in France.

Among other points of interest, St. Julian's basilica is decorated with many fine Romanesque or Gothic capitals, a rare 15th century polychrome statue of the Virgin Mary in labour, and a large medieval crucifixion, popularly known as Christ the leper, which was originally in the leper colony at la Bageasse, to the south of Brioude.
