= Abbey of La Chaise-Dieu =

Abbey in Haute-Loire, France

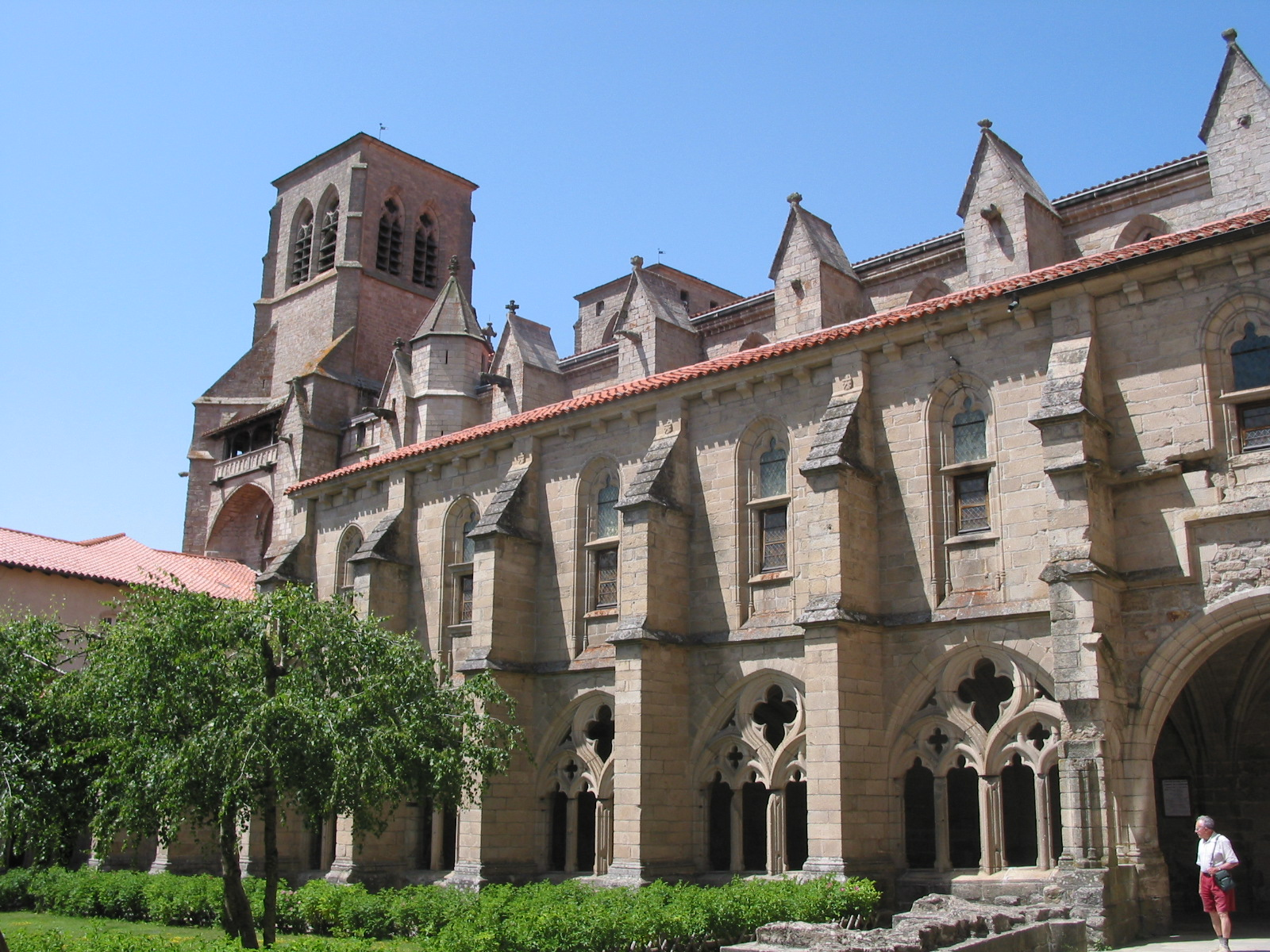

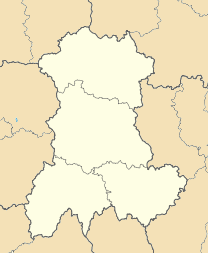
- Location within Auvergne-Rhône-Alpes Location within Auvergne Location within France

Religion
- Affiliation: Catholicism
- Province: Auvergne
- Region: Haute-Loire

Location
- Country: France
- Interactive map of Abbey of La Chaise-Dieu
- Administration: Auvergne-Rhône-Alpes
- Coordinates: 45.3208°N 3.6961°E

Architecture
- Style: Gothic

The Abbey of La Chaise-Dieu, in Auvergne (La Chasa-Dieu in Occitan), is a former Benedictine abbey, headquarters of the Casadean order, located in the commune of La Chaise-Dieu in the department of Haute-Loire.

The origin of the name is the Latin phrase Casa Dei (The House of God), hence the adjective "Casadean." The Benedictine abbey is renowned for its Gothic architecture, its rich library, its workshop for liturgical books, its Danse Macabre, its curious Hall of Echoes, its choir tapestry composed of twelve Flemish tapestries, and its music festival founded in 1966 by György Cziffra.

== History ==
The Benedictine abbey, which gave its name (derived by analogical assonance from medieval Latin Casadei) to a portion of the Auvergne plateau, was founded in 1043 by Robert de Turlande, a hermit, Étienne de Chaliers, and a certain Delmas along with his disciples who arrived promptly. Robert de Turlande obtained both the protection of the Holy See and a diploma from the King of the Franks, Henry I, dated September 20, 1052, confirming its elevation to an abbey.

On August 18, 1095, Pope Urban II visited the abbey and proceeded with the dedication of the abbey church in honor of Saint Vital of Bologna and his master Saint Agricola, as confirmed by a papal bull dated September 7 at Saint-Gilles.

A real growth began in the 14th century. In May 1342, Pierre Rogier, one of the monks of La Chaise-Dieu, became pope in Avignon under the name Clement VI. It was he who financed the demolition of the old Romanesque church and the construction of the new abbey church in which he would be buried. He enlisted the three greatest architects of the time: Hugues Morel, Pierre de Cébazat, and Pierre Falciat. The abbey church was completed in 1378, during the pontificate of Pope Gregory XI, who was Clement VI's own nephew.

== Architecture ==
The abbey church of Saint-Robert was built from 1344 to 1352 in the Gothic style, at the behest of Pope Clement VI to house his tomb.

The abbey church replaces the old Romanesque building at the foot of which Saint Robert de Turlande, founder of the abbey, had been buried.

Larger and more spacious, the new abbey church belongs to the period of Rayonnant Gothic, embodying a version marked by great austerity. It is often considered a work of Southern Gothic, although its significance extends well beyond this regional context. The building has been classified as a historical monument since 1840.

The church's west façade, approached by a flight of steps, is flanked by two massive towers. The nave and aisles are of equal height and are separated from the choir by a stone rood screen. The choir, terminating in an apse with radiating chapel, contains the tomb and statue of Clement VI, carved stalls and some Flemish tapestries of the early 16th century. There is a ruined cloister on the south side.

== See also ==
- List of Benedictine monasteries in France
