= Brioude =

- Subprefecture
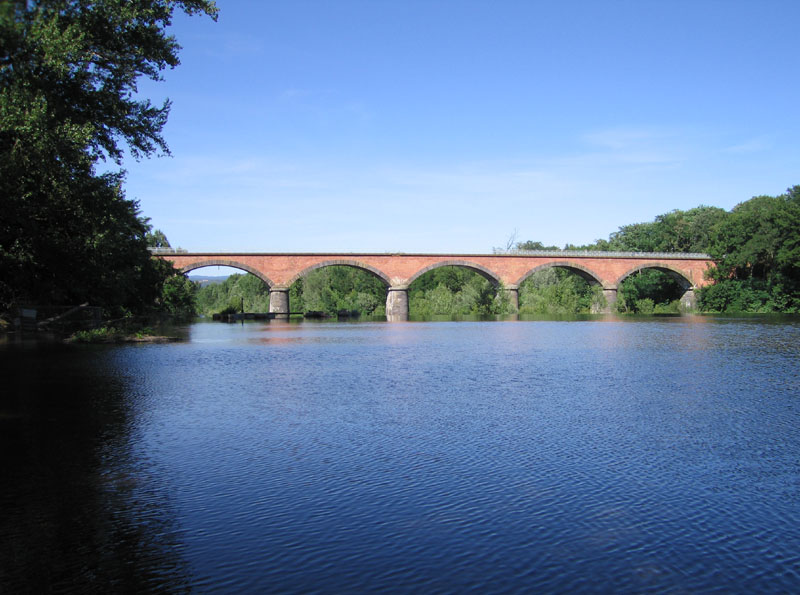
- Bridge over the Allier

- Coat of arms
- Location of Brioude
- Location within France Location within Auvergne-Rhône-Alpes
- Coordinates: 45°17′42″N 3°23′06″E
- Country: France
- Region: Auvergne-Rhône-Alpes
- Department: Haute-Loire
- Arrondissement: Brioude
- Canton: Brioude

Government
  - Mayor (2020–2026): Jean-Luc Vachelard
- Area^{1}: 13.52 km^{2} (5.22 sq mi)
- Highest elevation: 622 m (2,041 ft)
- Lowest elevation: 414 m (1,358 ft)
- Population (2023): 6,527
  - Density: 482.8/km^{2} (1,250/sq mi)
- Time zone: UTC+01:00 (CET)
  - Summer (DST): UTC+02:00 (CEST)
- INSEE/Postal code: 43040 /43100
- ^{1} French Land Register data, which excludes lakes, ponds, glaciers > 1 km^{2} (0.386 sq mi or 247 acres) and river estuaries.

Brioude (French pronunciation: [bʁijud]; Auvergnat: Briude) is a commune in the Haute-Loire department in the Auvergne-Rhône-Alpes region in south-central France. It lies on the banks of the river Allier, a tributary of the Loire.

== History ==
At Brioude, the ancient Brivas, its martyrs in the 4th century, Julien and Ferréol, became its patron saints; according to the Chronicle of Moissac, Euric of Toulouse had the basilica built, in the fourteenth year of his reign (c. 480): it was wondrously decorated with columns. The emperor Avitus (acclaimed at Toulouse, died 456) had already been buried at the shrine of Julian at Brivas (Brioude), according to Gregory of Tours. Euric's basilica may have served to venerate both the saint and the Visigothic candidate for Roman Emperor.

Brioude was taken by the Franks, then in turn besieged and captured by the Goths (532), the Burgundians, the Saracens (732) and the Normans. Carolingian Brioude remained a place of some importance: William I of Aquitaine minted deniers at Brioude. When Louis V of France married Adelaide of Anjou there in 980 they were crowned King and Queen of Aquitaine; the couple was mismatched in age, and Adelaide fled Louis' house in 982, to Arles. The feast of Saint Julian, 28 August, drew such crowds to the saint's relics that in the mid-11th century the chapter was obliged to build a hostel to care for the indigent pilgrim and the sick.

In 1181 Eracle III, viscount of Polignac, who had sacked the town two years previously, made public apology in front of the church and established a body of 25 knights to defend the relics of St Julian. Odilo, later the reforming abbot of Cluny, began his vocation at St Julian of Brioude, where 54 canons, all of noble birth, held a rank equivalent to bishop: Odilo's biographer reports that he fled. For some time after 1361 the town was the headquarters of Bérenger, lord of Castelnau, who was at the head of one of the bands of military adventurers which then devastated France. The knights (or canons, as they afterwards became) of St Julian bore the title of counts of Brioude and for a long time opposed themselves to the civic liberties of the inhabitants.

The Franks Casket is believed to have been looted from St Julian of Brioude church during the French Revolution

The Almanach de Brioude published annually from 1919 has included many articles of local and broader interest.

== Population ==
Historical population

Year	Pop.	±% p.a.
1793	4,983	—
1800	5,386	+1.12%
1806	5,486	+0.31%
1821	5,132	−0.44%
1831	5,099	−0.06%
1836	5,247	+0.57%
1841	4,940	−1.20%
1846	4,962	+0.09%
1851	4,804	−0.65%
1856	4,928	+0.51%
1861	4,950	+0.09%
1866	4,932	−0.07%
1872	4,616	−1.10%
1876	4,747	+0.70%
1881	4,987	+0.99%
1886	5,102	+0.46%
1891	4,928	−0.69%
1896	4,963	+0.14%
1901	4,841	−0.50%

Year	Pop.	±% p.a.
1906	4,865	+0.10%
1911	4,903	+0.16%
1921	4,754	−0.31%
1926	5,104	+1.43%
1931	5,113	+0.04%
1936	5,039	−0.29%
1946	5,623	+1.10%
1954	5,687	+0.14%
1962	6,184	+1.05%
1968	7,195	+2.56%
1975	7,773	+1.11%
1982	7,483	−0.54%
1990	7,285	−0.33%
1999	6,820	−0.73%
2007	6,677	−0.26%
2012	6,616	−0.18%
2017	6,721	+0.32%
2023	6,527	−0.49%

Source: EHESS and INSEE (1968-2023)

== Sights ==
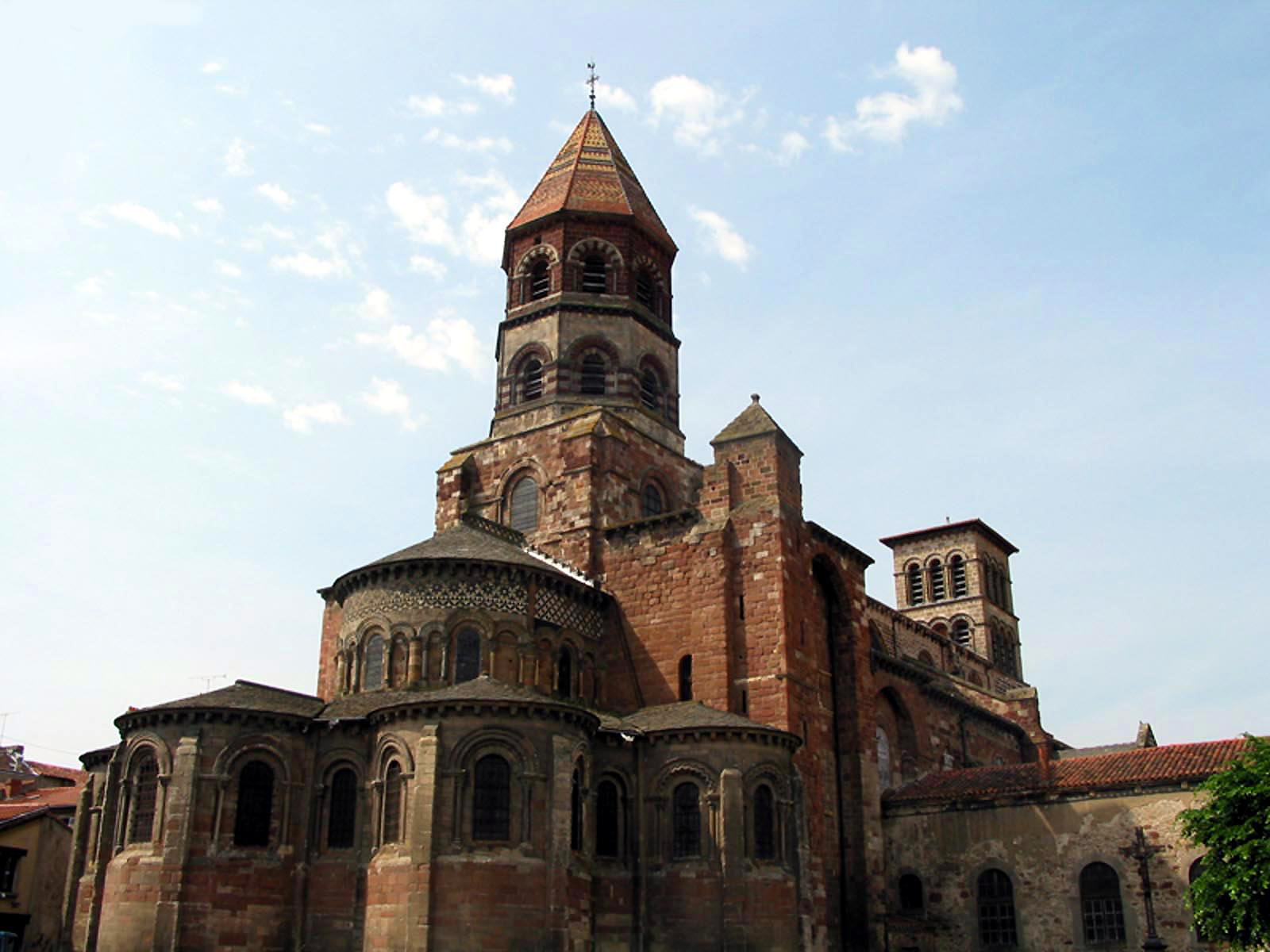
Basilica of St. Julien (1060-1180).

- Basilica of St. Julien, the largest Christian church in Auvergne. Built in the 11th-14th centuries, it has notable polychrome frescoes.
- Hôtel de la Dentelle.
- Maison du Saumon et de la Rivière, now an aquarium-museum.
- Château Domeyrat.

== Personalities ==
- Eparchius Avitus, buried in Brioude next to Saint Julian's tomb
- Monsieur de Sainte-Colombe died in Brioude in 1688
- Marc Culetto (born 1956), footballer
- Pierre Vigouroux (born 30 June 1983), rugby union player in the AS Montferrandaise and till 2004 with the French U-21 team for the U-21 World Championships in Scotland.
- Emmanuel Mouret, director, filmwriter and actor
- Hélène Rey, professor of economics, grew up in Brioude
- Romain Bardet (born 1990), former professional cyclist
- Isabelle Mege, amateur model
- Jean-Pierre Vigier, politician who represents Haute-Loire's 2nd constituency in the National Assembly
- Amaury Pierron (born 4 March 1996), downhill mountain bike racer

== Twin towns ==
- Cardigan, United Kingdom, since 1972
- Laufen, Germany, since 1982
- Suzzara, Italy, since 1995
- Gonzaga, Italy, since 1995
- Moreira da Maia, Portugal, since 2007
- Trevelin, Argentina

== See also ==
- Brivadois
