= Arrondissement of Yssingeaux =

Coordinates: 45°08′30″N 4°07′19″E

Yssingeaux
- Arrondissement
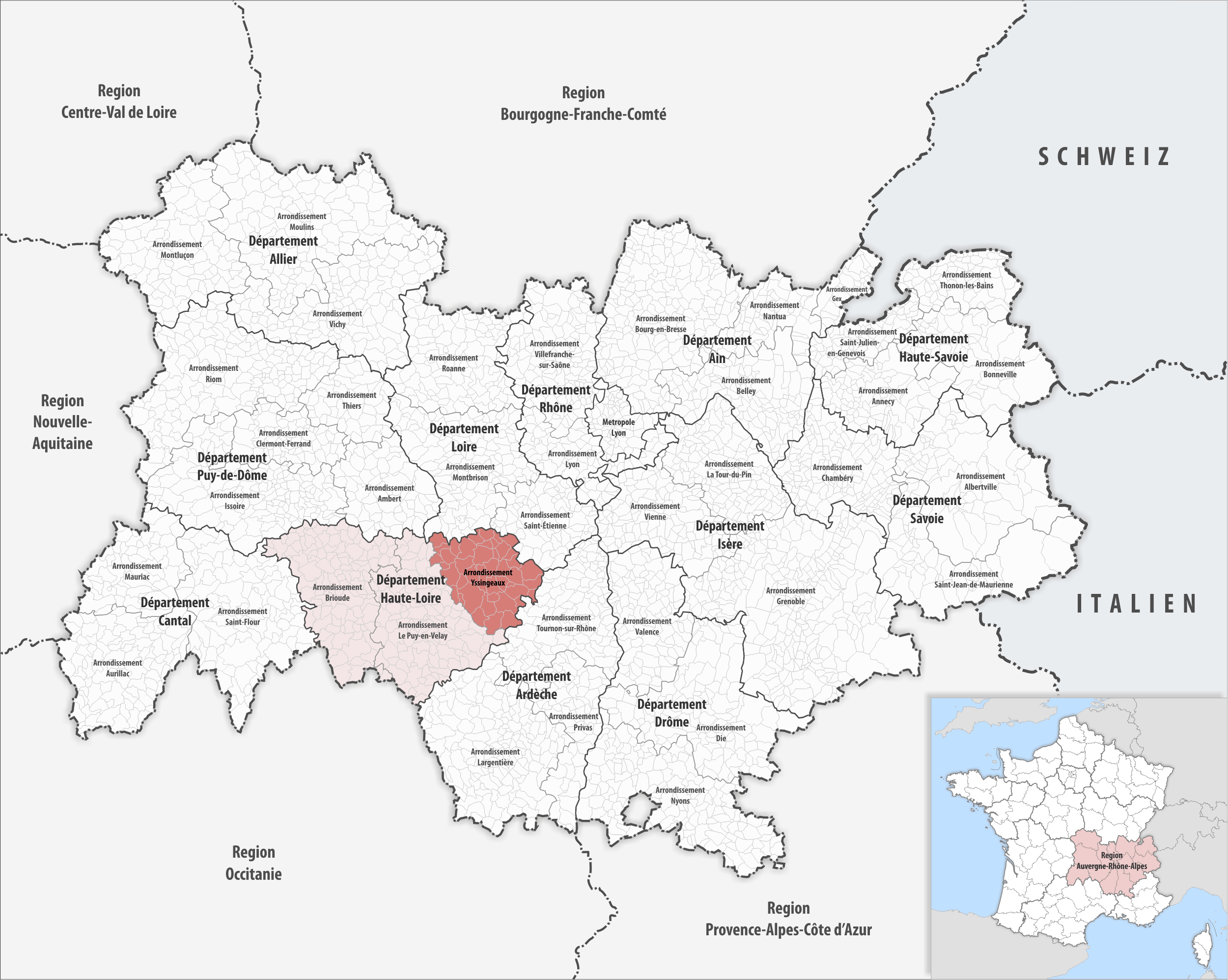
- Location within the region Auvergne-Rhône-Alpes
- Country: France
- Region: Auvergne-Rhône-Alpes
- Department: Haute-Loire
- No. of communes: {{{nbcomm}}}
- Area: 1,159.7 km^{2} (447.8 sq mi)
- Population (2023): 86,730
  - Density: 74.79/km^{2} (193.7/sq mi)
- INSEE code: 433

The arrondissement of Yssingeaux is an arrondissement of France in the Haute-Loire departement in the Auvergne-Rhône-Alpes region. It has 44 communes. Its population is 85,960 (2021), and its area is 1,159.7 km^{2} (447.8 sq mi).

== Composition ==
The communes of the arrondissement of Yssingeaux, and their INSEE codes, are:

1. Araules (43007)
2. Aurec-sur-Loire (43012)
3. Bas-en-Basset (43020)
4. Beaux (43024)
5. Beauzac (43025)
6. Bessamorel (43028)
7. Boisset (43034)
8. Le Chambon-sur-Lignon (43051)
9. La Chapelle-d'Aurec (43058)
10. Chenereilles (43069)
11. Dunières (43087)
12. Grazac (43102)
13. Lapte (43114)
14. Malvalette (43127)
15. Le Mas-de-Tence (43129)
16. Mazet-Saint-Voy (43130)
17. Monistrol-sur-Loire (43137)
18. Montfaucon-en-Velay (43141)
19. Montregard (43142)
20. Pont-Salomon (43153)
21. Raucoules (43159)
22. Retournac (43162)
23. Riotord (43163)
24. Saint-André-de-Chalencon (43166)
25. Saint-Bonnet-le-Froid (43172)
26. Saint-Didier-en-Velay (43177)
27. Sainte-Sigolène (43224)
28. Saint-Ferréol-d'Auroure (43184)
29. Saint-Jeures (43199)
30. Saint-Julien-du-Pinet (43203)
31. Saint-Julien-Molhesabate (43204)
32. Saint-Just-Malmont (43205)
33. Saint-Maurice-de-Lignon (43211)
34. Saint-Pal-de-Chalencon (43212)
35. Saint-Pal-de-Mons (43213)
36. Saint-Romain-Lachalm (43223)
37. Saint-Victor-Malescours (43227)
38. La Séauve-sur-Semène (43236)
39. Solignac-sous-Roche (43240)
40. Tence (43244)
41. Tiranges (43246)
42. Valprivas (43249)
43. Les Villettes (43265)
44. Yssingeaux (43268)

== History ==
The arrondissement of Yssingeaux was created in 1800, disbanded in 1926 and restored in 1942.

As a result of the reorganisation of the cantons of France which came into effect in 2015, the borders of the cantons are no longer related to the borders of the arrondissements. The cantons of the arrondissement of Yssingeaux were, as of January 2015:

1. Aurec-sur-Loire
2. Bas-en-Basset
3. Monistrol-sur-Loire
4. Montfaucon-en-Velay
5. Retournac
6. Saint-Didier-en-Velay
7. Sainte-Sigolène
8. Tence
9. Yssingeaux
