= Château de Chalencon =

Castle in Auvergne-Rhône-Alpes, France

Coordinates: 45°17′02″N 3°58′59″E

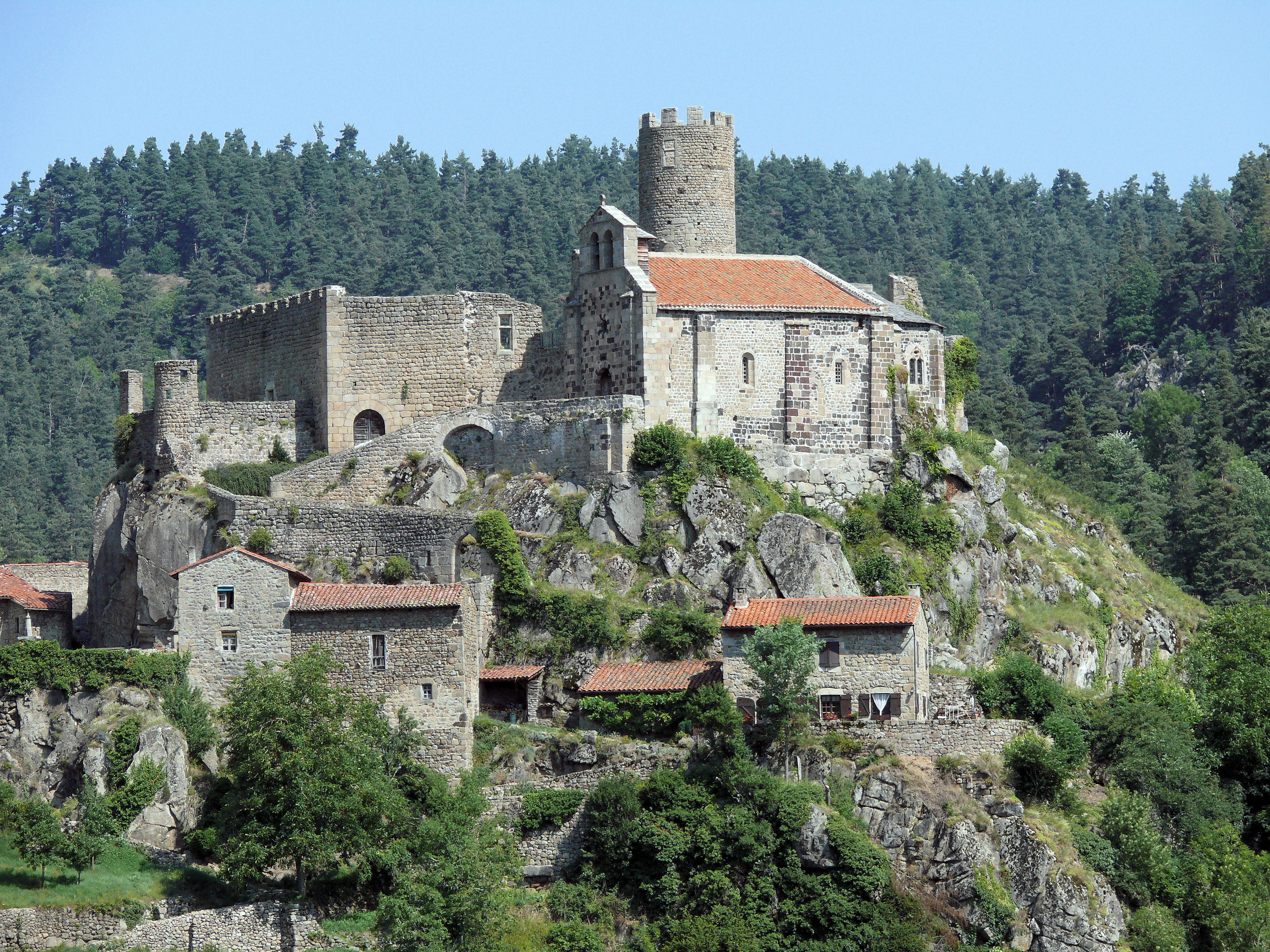
View of the Château de Chalencon to the left and the tower behind the chapel.

The Château de Chalencon is a feudal monument situated in the hamlet of Chalencon, about 1 kilometre north east of the village of Saint-André-de-Chalencon, in the Haute-Loire département, in the Auvergne-Rhône-Alpes region of France.

== History ==
It is the birthplace of the illustrious Chalencon family, later allied with the Polignacs, one of the most important of Velay.

In the Middle Ages, Chalencon was a strategic site on the route between Velay and Forez. The castle was built in the 10th century to control the route, and particularly the pont du Diable (Devil's Bridge) below the castle which was the sole crossing point of the Ance and subject to a toll.

The castle was best known for its battle between Napoleon III's army and the Prussian Captain Herlter. It is said that 100 men were killed in this battle (known as the "battle against life"); the hero of this battle was Belotus de Veyrac, a noble and Count of Veyrac. The battle was brought to the screen by a young director. Today, to celebrate the battle, on June 28, many people gather on the site.

There is a controversy because the niches are the work of the architects of Viollet-le-Duc, a medieval site restorer under Napoleon III. Given the location of the tower, it was more likely a flat tower where a fire was maintained during the misty winter nights so that merchants and pilgrims could spot each other.

== Description ==
The remains of the Château de Chalencon are on the summit of a rocky outcrop dominating the Ance river, consisting of three terraces at different levels, of which one, to the west, overlooks the village. There is a keep, a round fortified tower at the top with crenellations, two corner turrets, partly rebuilt at the beginning of the 20th century, and some windows from the end of the 13th century. The castle was definitively abandoned around 1600. It has been listed as a monument historique since 1913.

The chapel seems to date from the end of the 11th century, with alterations in later times including the construction of a large window in the 15th century.

The keep and the tower were classified as monuments historiques on 15 November 1913, the chapel on 10 September 1913. It is not far from the 12th century Devil's Bridge (historic monument) and the ruins of the so-called prefecture building that would have housed the administration's justice rooms.

There is evidence of the existence of a pagan cult (the Chalencon rock basins on the right when arriving at the village, including the Chaise des lutins or lutin's chair).

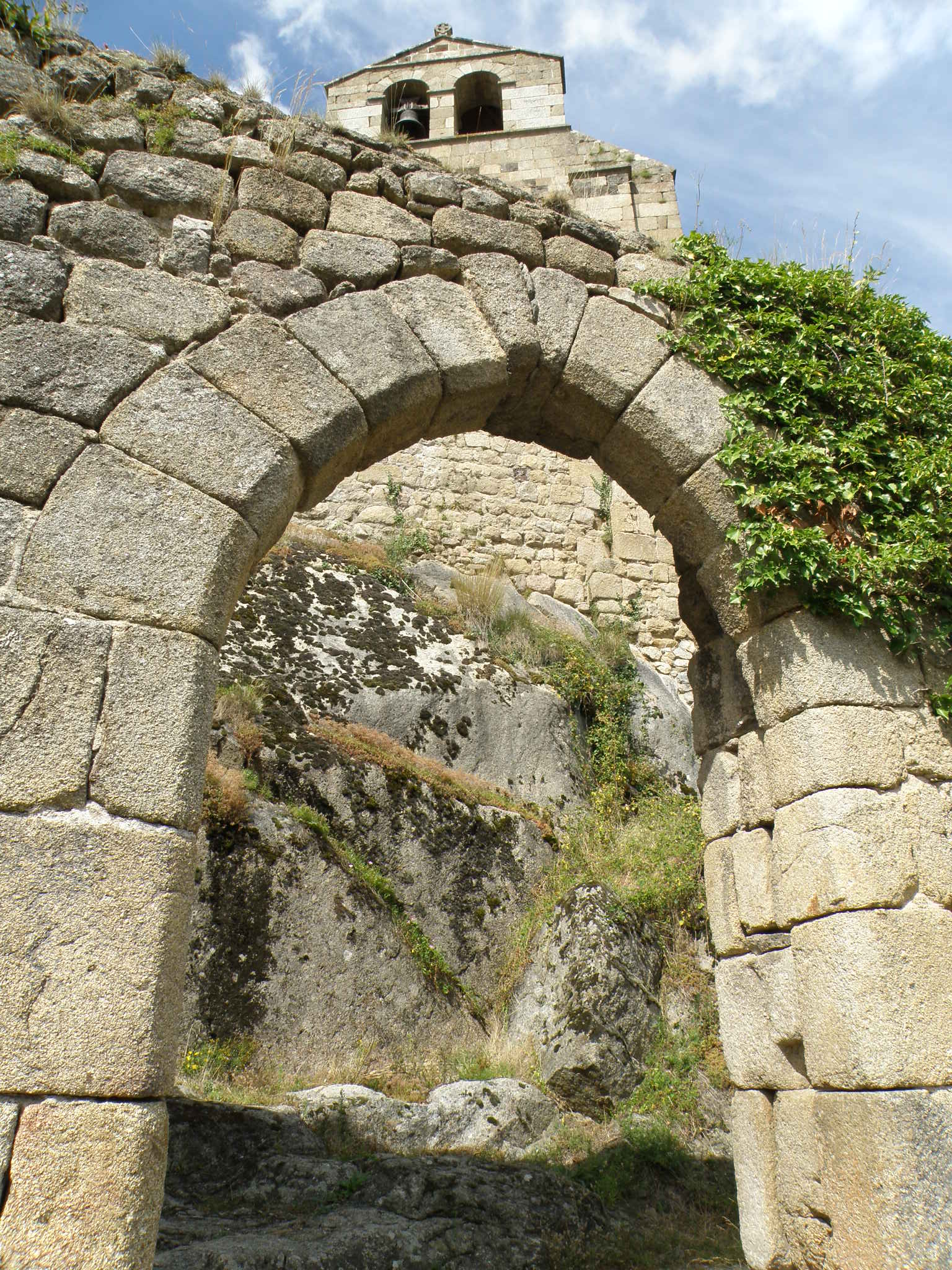
Gateway on the ramp leading from the village to the castle. Above, the bell-gable of the chapel.

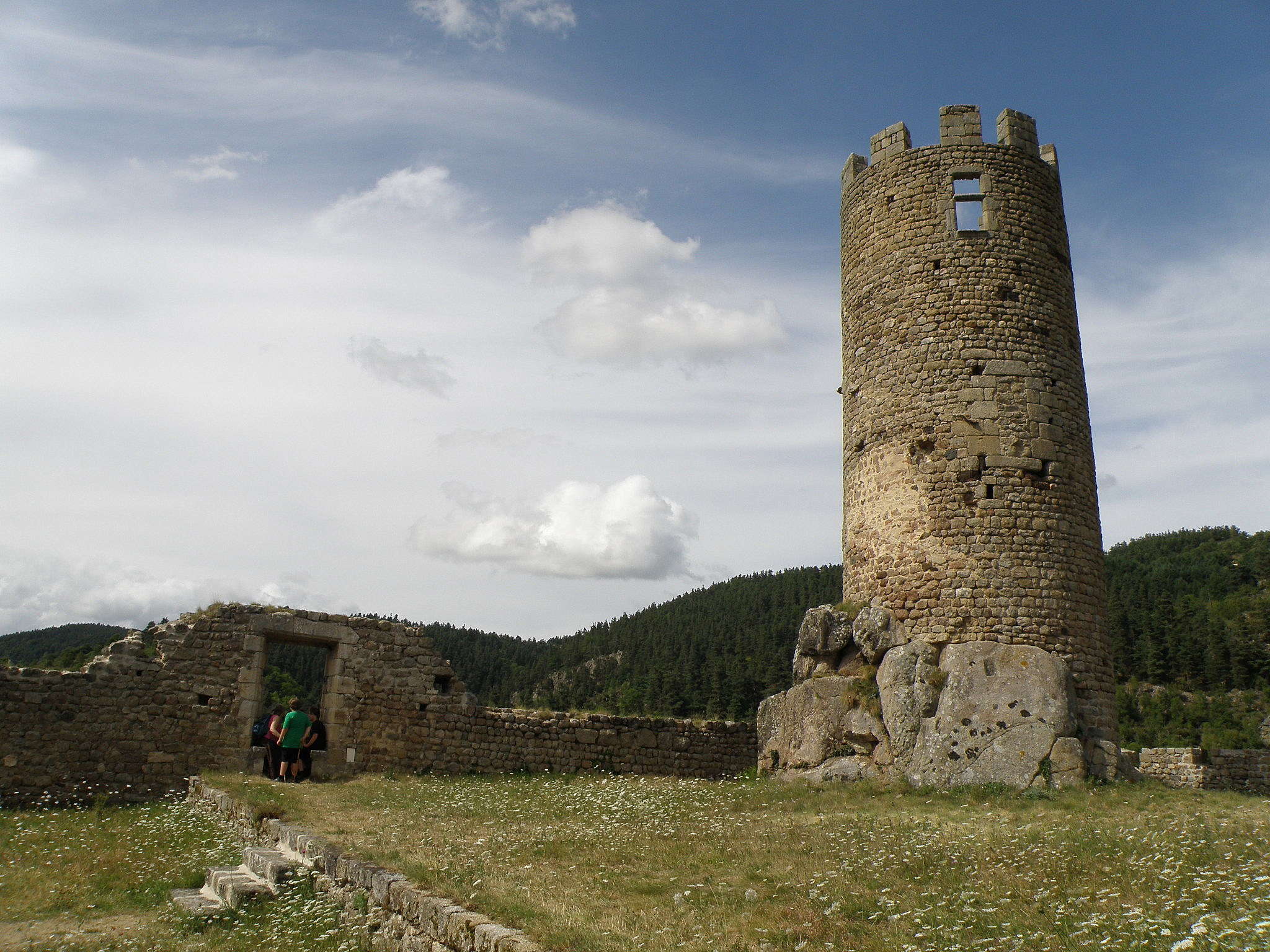
Inside the enceinte.

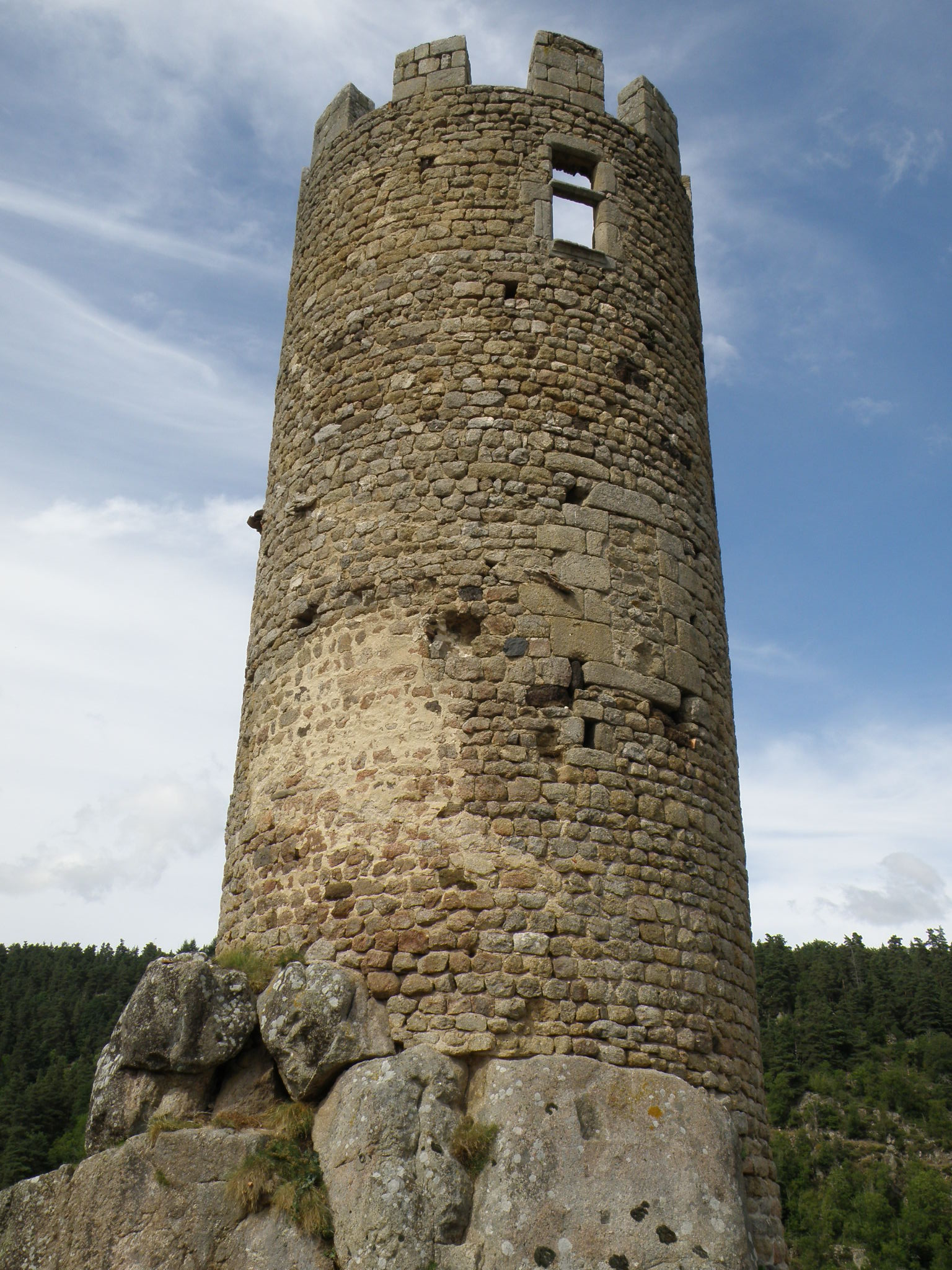
View of the tower.

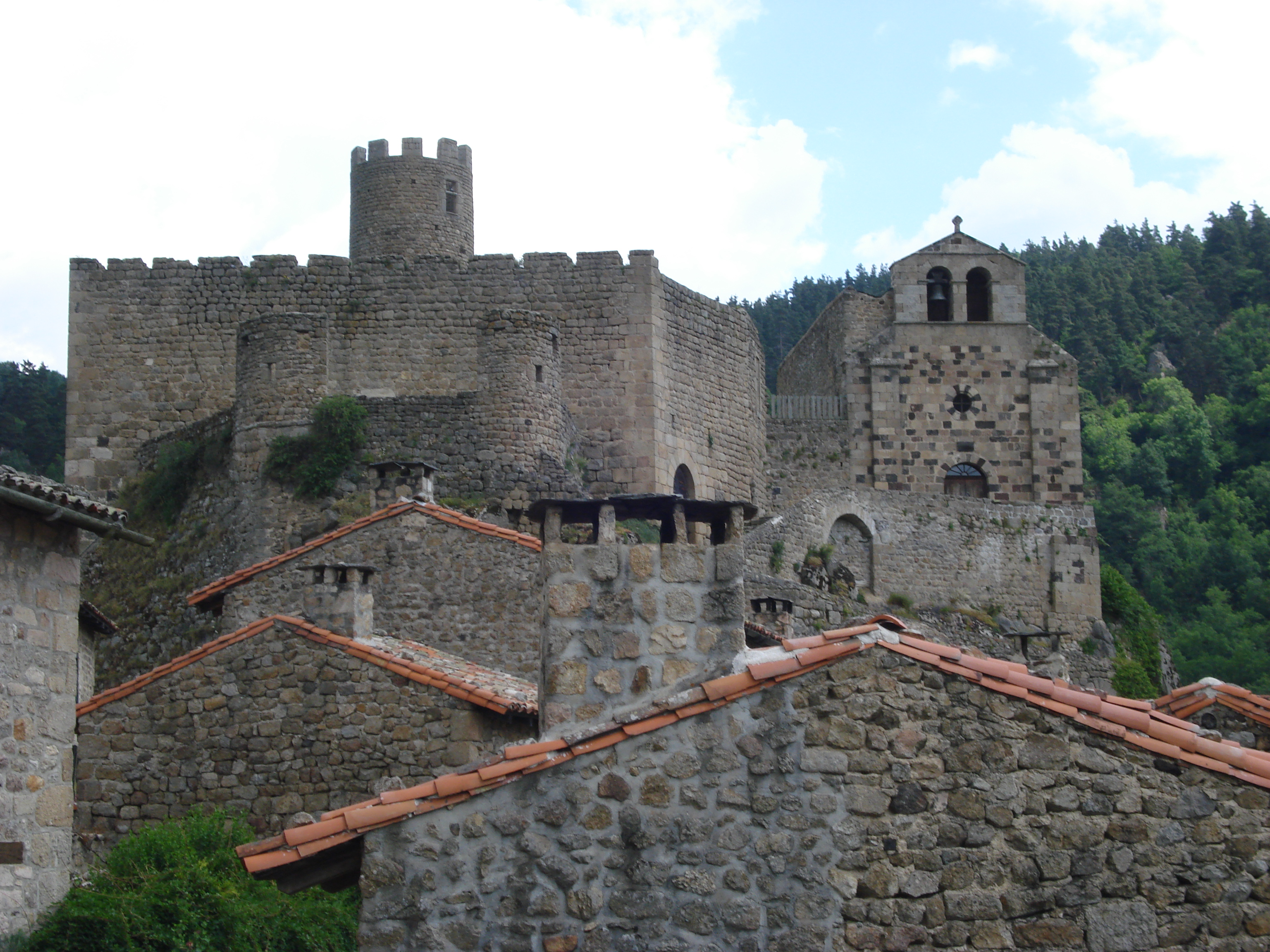
The castle (left) and chapel (right).

== Today ==
In 2015, the commune allocated 100,000 euros to develop tourist facilities around the castle. The castle itself is private and the property of the Polignac family.

== See also ==
- List of castles in France

== Bibliography ==
- Jourda de Vaux Gaston, Les Châteaux Historiques de la Haute-Loire, Éditions de la Société Académique du Puy-en-Velay et de la Haute-Loire, Le Puy-en-Velay, 1911
