= Sainte-Sigolène =

- Commune
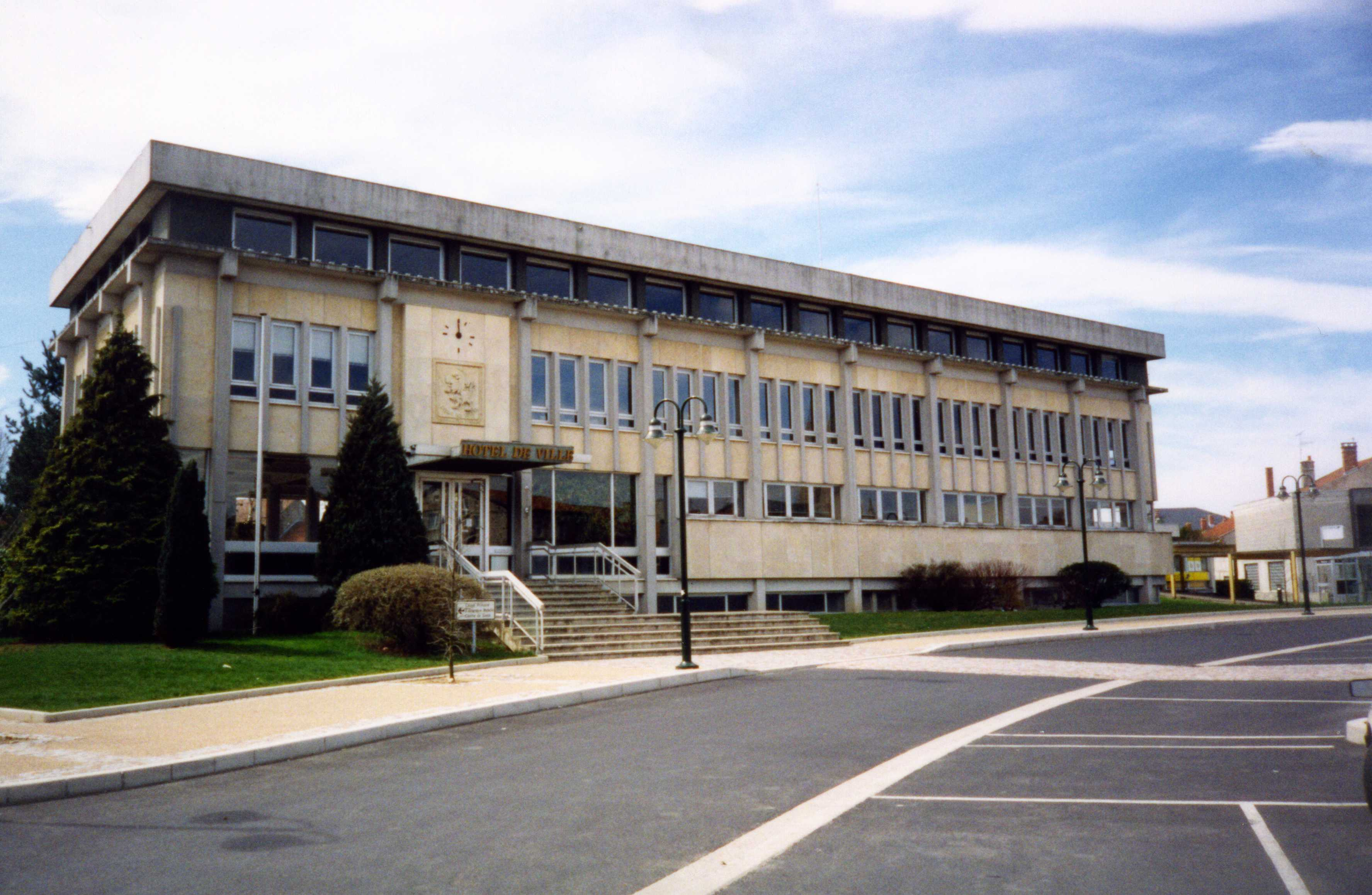
- Town hall

- Coat of arms
- Location of Sainte-Sigolène
- Location within France Location within Auvergne-Rhône-Alpes
- Coordinates: 45°14′38″N 4°14′07″E
- Country: France
- Region: Auvergne-Rhône-Alpes
- Department: Haute-Loire
- Arrondissement: Yssingeaux
- Canton: Deux Rivières et Vallées

Government
  - Mayor (2023–2026): Didier Rouchouse
- Area^{1}: 30.64 km^{2} (11.83 sq mi)
- Elevation: 810 m (2,660 ft)
- Highest elevation: 854 m (2,802 ft)
- Lowest elevation: 560 m (1,840 ft)
- Population (2023): 6,097
  - Density: 199.0/km^{2} (515.4/sq mi)
- Time zone: UTC+01:00 (CET)
  - Summer (DST): UTC+02:00 (CEST)
- INSEE/Postal code: 43224 /43600
- ^{1} French Land Register data, which excludes lakes, ponds, glaciers > 1 km^{2} (0.386 sq mi or 247 acres) and river estuaries.

Sainte-Sigolène (French pronunciation: [sɛ̃t siɡɔlɛn]; Vivaro-Alpine: Santa Sigolena) is a commune in the Haute-Loire department in south-central France.

== Population ==
Historical population

Year	Pop.	±% p.a.
1793	2,531	—
1800	2,251	−1.66%
1806	2,469	+1.55%
1821	2,519	+0.13%
1831	2,702	+0.70%
1836	2,872	+1.23%
1841	3,168	+1.98%
1846	3,215	+0.29%
1851	3,317	+0.63%
1856	3,521	+1.20%
1861	2,978	−3.29%
1866	2,991	+0.09%
1872	2,948	−0.24%
1876	3,303	+2.88%
1881	3,390	+0.52%
1886	3,744	+2.01%
1891	4,124	+1.95%
1896	4,463	+1.59%
1901	4,737	+1.20%

Year	Pop.	±% p.a.
1906	4,958	+0.92%
1911	4,924	−0.14%
1921	4,502	−0.89%
1926	4,414	−0.39%
1931	4,101	−1.46%
1936	3,972	−0.64%
1946	3,438	−1.43%
1954	3,159	−1.05%
1962	3,535	+1.42%
1968	4,055	+2.31%
1975	4,508	+1.52%
1982	5,052	+1.64%
1990	5,236	+0.45%
1999	5,432	+0.41%
2007	5,827	+0.88%
2012	5,962	+0.46%
2017	5,959	−0.01%
2023	6,097	+0.38%

Source: EHESS and INSEE (1968-2023)

== See also ==
- Communes of the Haute-Loire department
