= Bas-en-Basset =

- Commune
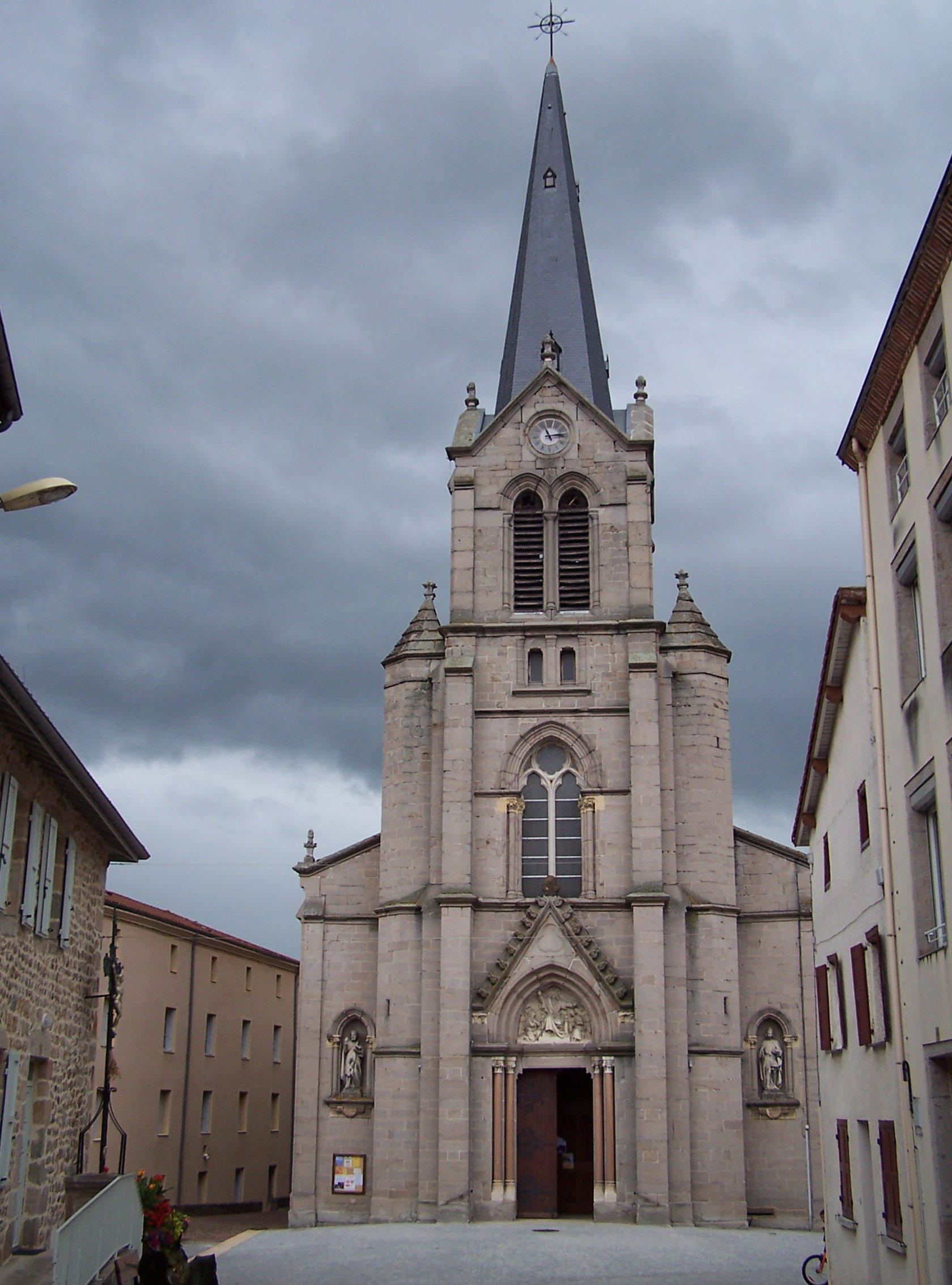
- Church of Saint-Thyrse

- Coat of arms
- Location of Bas-en-Basset
- Location within France Location within Auvergne-Rhône-Alpes
- Coordinates: 45°18′24″N 4°06′36″E
- Country: France
- Region: Auvergne-Rhône-Alpes
- Department: Haute-Loire
- Arrondissement: Yssingeaux
- Canton: Bas-en-Basset

Government
  - Mayor (2020–2026): Guy Jolivet
- Area^{1}: 46.76 km^{2} (18.05 sq mi)
- Elevation: 450 m (1,480 ft)
- Highest elevation: 901 m (2,956 ft)
- Lowest elevation: 433 m (1,421 ft)
- Population (2023): 4,638
  - Density: 99.19/km^{2} (256.9/sq mi)
- Time zone: UTC+01:00 (CET)
  - Summer (DST): UTC+02:00 (CEST)
- INSEE/Postal code: 43020 /43210
- ^{1} French Land Register data, which excludes lakes, ponds, glaciers > 1 km^{2} (0.386 sq mi or 247 acres) and river estuaries.

Bas-en-Basset (French pronunciation: [bas ɑ̃ basɛ]; Occitan: Bas de Bassès) is a commune in the Haute-Loire department in south-central France.

== Population ==
Historical population
Year	Pop.	±% p.a.
1968	2,280	—
1975	2,303	+0.14%
1982	2,521	+1.30%
1990	2,955	+2.01%
1999	3,344	+1.38%
2007	3,910	+1.97%
2012	4,286	+1.85%
2017	4,348	+0.29%
2023	4,638	+1.08%
Source: INSEE

== See also ==
- Communes of the Haute-Loire department
