= Pont-Salomon =

- Commune
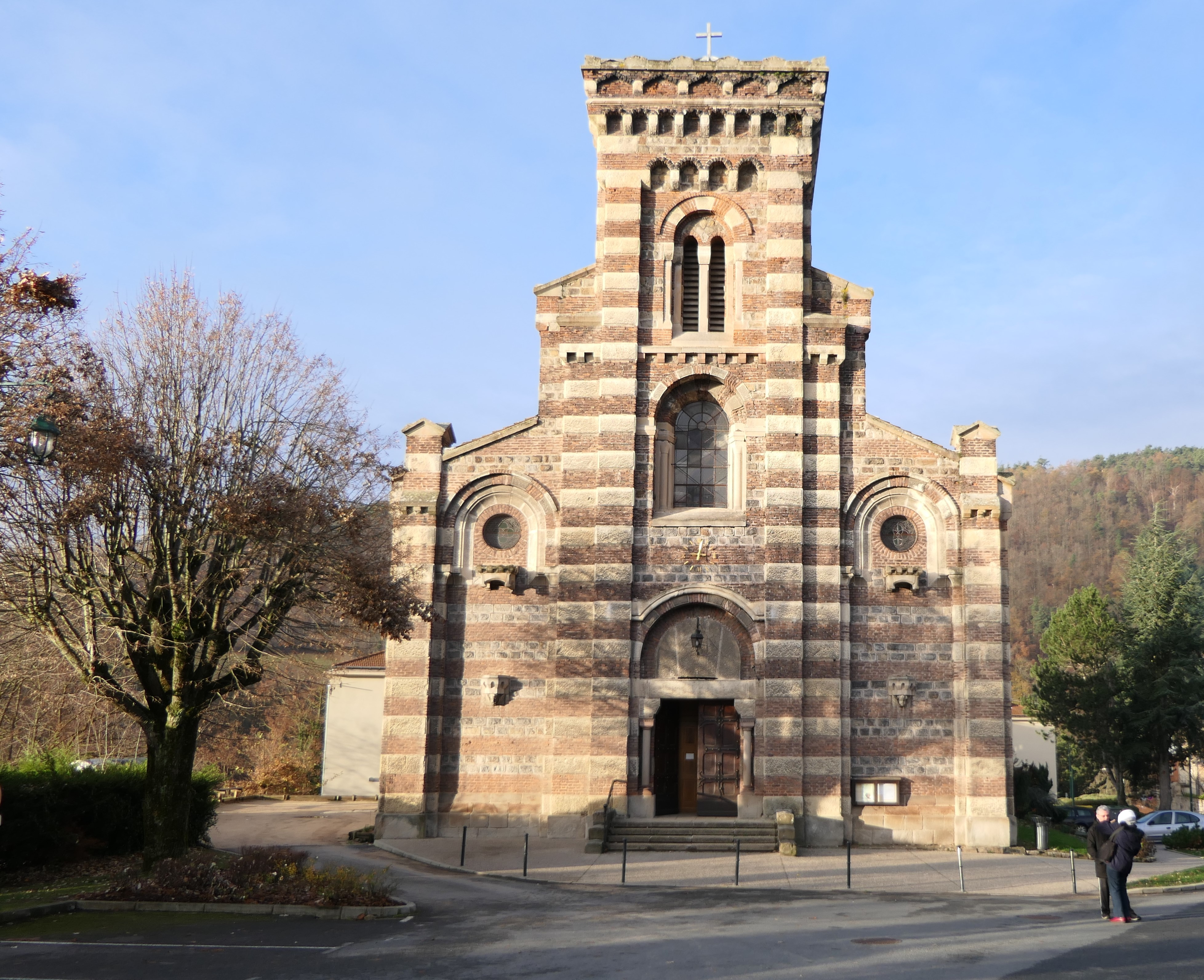

- Coat of arms
- Location of Pont-Salomon
- Location within France Location within Auvergne-Rhône-Alpes
- Coordinates: 45°20′19″N 4°14′55″E
- Country: France
- Region: Auvergne-Rhône-Alpes
- Department: Haute-Loire
- Arrondissement: Yssingeaux
- Canton: Aurec-sur-Loire

Government
  - Mayor (2020–2026): David Rabeyrin
- Area^{1}: 8.43 km^{2} (3.25 sq mi)
- Elevation: 633 m (2,077 ft)
- Highest elevation: 803 m (2,635 ft)
- Lowest elevation: 552 m (1,811 ft)
- Population (2023): 1,875
  - Density: 222/km^{2} (576/sq mi)
- Time zone: UTC+01:00 (CET)
  - Summer (DST): UTC+02:00 (CEST)
- INSEE/Postal code: 43153 /43330
- ^{1} French Land Register data, which excludes lakes, ponds, glaciers > 1 km^{2} (0.386 sq mi or 247 acres) and river estuaries.

Pont-Salomon (French pronunciation: [pɔ̃ salɔmɔ̃]; Occitan: Lo Pont de Salamon) is a commune in the Haute-Loire department in south-central France.

== Population ==
Historical population
Year	Pop.	±% p.a.
1968	1,546	—
1975	1,352	−1.90%
1982	1,341	−0.12%
1990	1,637	+2.52%
1999	1,664	+0.18%
2007	1,788	+0.90%
2012	1,927	+1.51%
2017	2,019	+0.94%
2023	1,875	−1.23%
Source: INSEE

== See also ==
- Communes of the Haute-Loire department
