= Beauzac =

- Commune
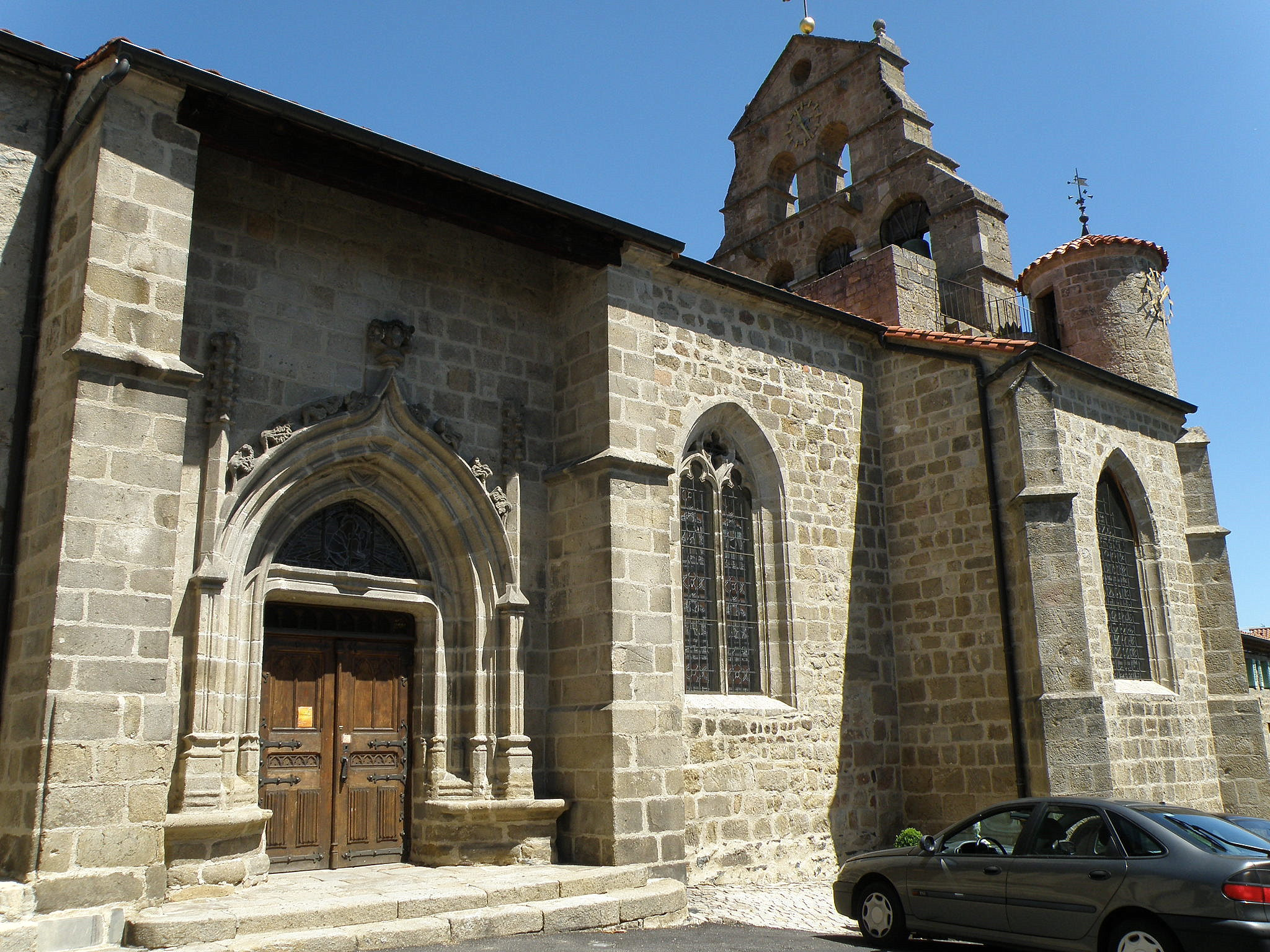

- Coat of arms
- Location of Beauzac
- Location within France Location within Auvergne-Rhône-Alpes
- Coordinates: 45°15′36″N 4°05′57″E
- Country: France
- Region: Auvergne-Rhône-Alpes
- Department: Haute-Loire
- Arrondissement: Yssingeaux
- Canton: Bas-en-Basset

Government
  - Mayor (2020–2026): Jean-Pierre Moncher
- Area^{1}: 36.33 km^{2} (14.03 sq mi)
- Elevation: 555 m (1,821 ft)
- Highest elevation: 969 m (3,179 ft)
- Lowest elevation: 440 m (1,440 ft)
- Population (2023): 2,954
  - Density: 81.31/km^{2} (210.6/sq mi)
- Time zone: UTC+01:00 (CET)
  - Summer (DST): UTC+02:00 (CEST)
- INSEE/Postal code: 43025 /43590
- ^{1} French Land Register data, which excludes lakes, ponds, glaciers > 1 km^{2} (0.386 sq mi or 247 acres) and river estuaries.

Beauzac (French pronunciation: [bozak]) is a commune in the Haute-Loire department in south-central France.

== Population ==
Historical population
Year	Pop.	±% p.a.
1968	1,472	—
1975	1,574	+0.96%
1982	1,867	+2.47%
1990	1,955	+0.58%
1999	2,061	+0.59%
2007	2,600	+2.95%
2012	2,755	+1.16%
2017	2,936	+1.28%
2023	2,954	+0.10%
Source: INSEE

== See also ==
- Communes of the Haute-Loire department
