= Solignac-sous-Roche =

- Commune
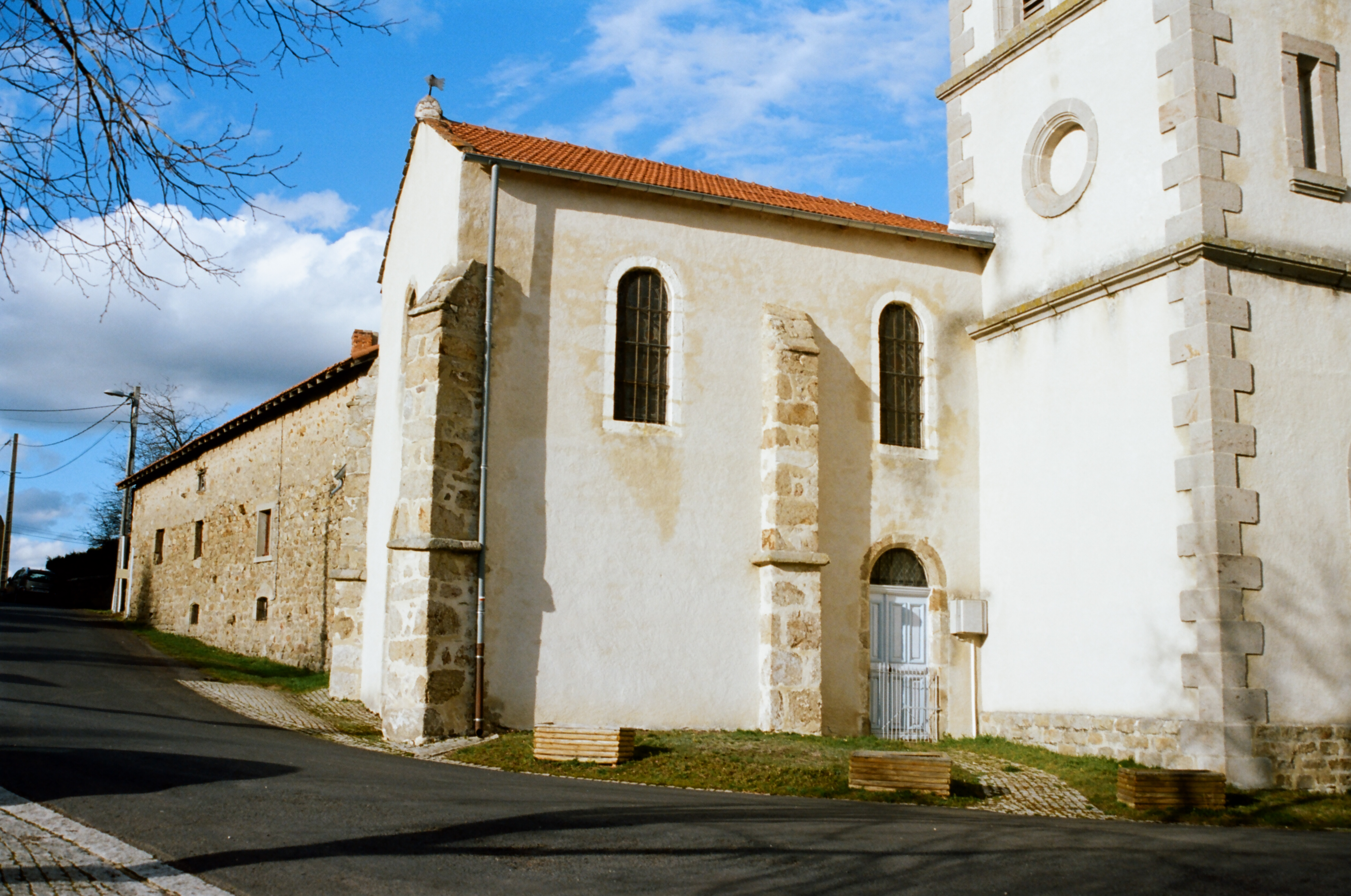
- Location of Solignac-sous-Roche
- Location within France Location within Auvergne-Rhône-Alpes
- Coordinates: 45°15′10″N 3°59′53″E
- Country: France
- Region: Auvergne-Rhône-Alpes
- Department: Haute-Loire
- Arrondissement: Yssingeaux
- Canton: Bas-en-Basset

Government
  - Mayor (2020–2026): Grégory Charreyre
- Area^{1}: 8.65 km^{2} (3.34 sq mi)
- Elevation: 850 m (2,790 ft)
- Highest elevation: 876 m (2,874 ft)
- Lowest elevation: 520 m (1,710 ft)
- Population (2023): 270
  - Density: 31/km^{2} (81/sq mi)
- Time zone: UTC+01:00 (CET)
  - Summer (DST): UTC+02:00 (CEST)
- INSEE/Postal code: 43240 /43130
- ^{1} French Land Register data, which excludes lakes, ponds, glaciers > 1 km^{2} (0.386 sq mi or 247 acres) and river estuaries.

Solignac-sous-Roche (French pronunciation: [sɔliɲak su ʁɔʃ]; Occitan: Solenhac sota Ròcha) is a commune in the Haute-Loire department in south-central France.

== Population ==
Historical population
Year	Pop.	±% p.a.
1968	164	—
1975	137	−2.54%
1982	127	−1.08%
1990	121	−0.60%
1999	151	+2.49%
2007	206	+3.96%
2012	221	+1.42%
2017	243	+1.92%
2023	270	+1.77%
Source: INSEE

== See also ==
- Communes of the Haute-Loire department
