= Retournac =

- Commune
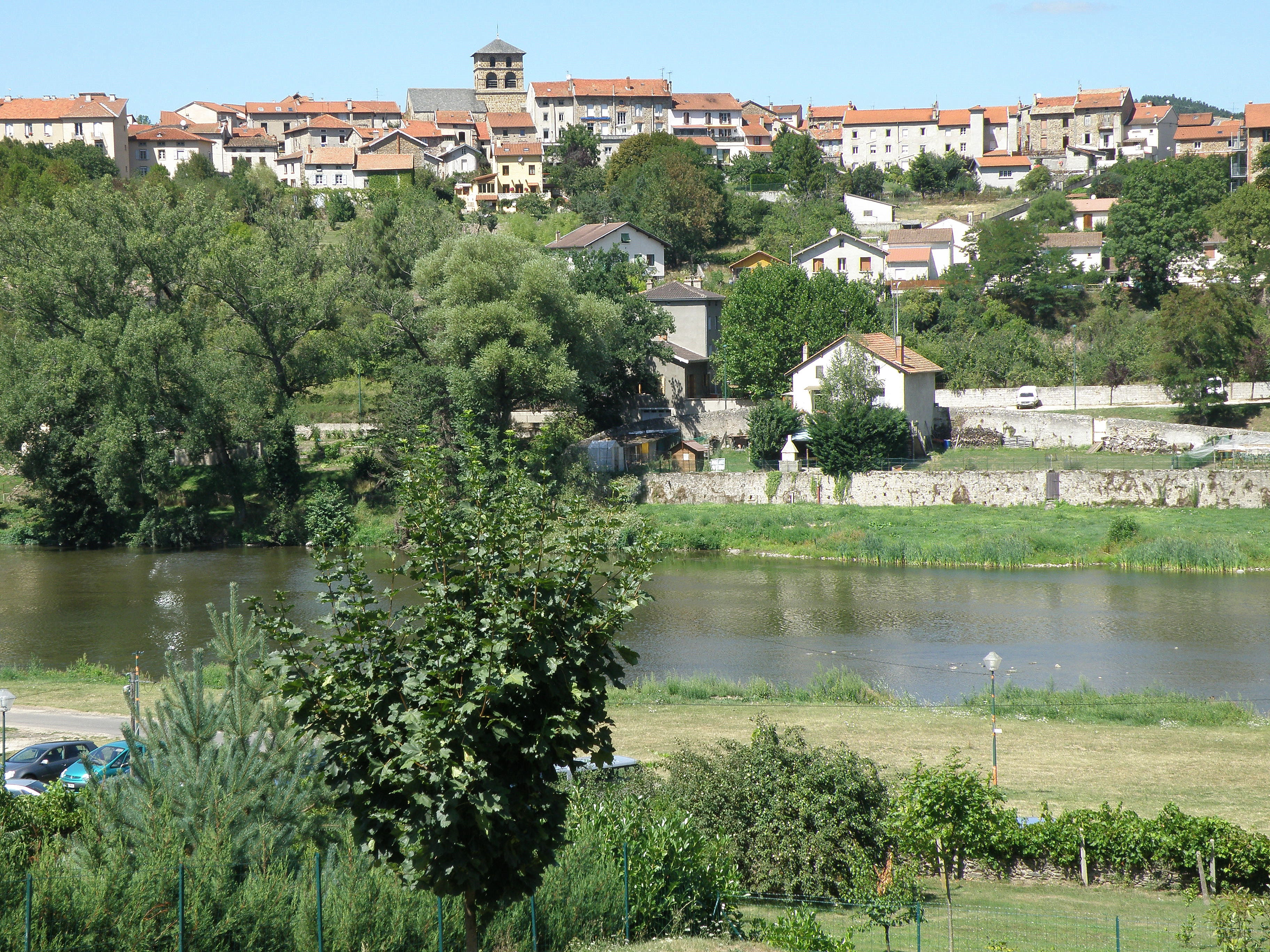

- Coat of arms
- Location of Retournac
- Location within France Location within Auvergne-Rhône-Alpes
- Coordinates: 45°12′16″N 4°02′02″E
- Country: France
- Region: Auvergne-Rhône-Alpes
- Department: Haute-Loire
- Arrondissement: Yssingeaux
- Canton: Bas-en-Basset

Government
  - Mayor (2020–2026): Patricia Goudard
- Area^{1}: 45.76 km^{2} (17.67 sq mi)
- Elevation: 509 m (1,670 ft)
- Highest elevation: 1,064 m (3,491 ft)
- Lowest elevation: 479 m (1,572 ft)
- Population (2023): 3,007
  - Density: 65.71/km^{2} (170.2/sq mi)
- Time zone: UTC+01:00 (CET)
  - Summer (DST): UTC+02:00 (CEST)
- INSEE/Postal code: 43162 /43130
- ^{1} French Land Register data, which excludes lakes, ponds, glaciers > 1 km^{2} (0.386 sq mi or 247 acres) and river estuaries.

Retournac (French pronunciation: [ʁətuʁnak]; Occitan: Retornac) is a commune in the Haute-Loire department in south-central France.

== Population ==
Historical population

Year	Pop.	±% p.a.
1793	4,019	—
1821	3,352	−0.65%
1846	3,623	+0.31%
1872	3,411	−0.23%
1901	3,630	+0.21%
1926	3,037	−0.71%
1946	3,028	−0.01%
1962	2,748	−0.60%
1968	2,600	−0.92%

Year	Pop.	±% p.a.
1975	2,558	−0.23%
1982	2,249	−1.82%
1990	2,270	+0.12%
1999	2,293	+0.11%
2007	2,590	+1.53%
2012	2,788	+1.48%
2017	2,929	+0.99%
2023	3,007	+0.44%

Source: EHESS and INSEE (1968-2023)

== See also ==
- Communes of the Haute-Loire department
