= Tiranges =

- Commune
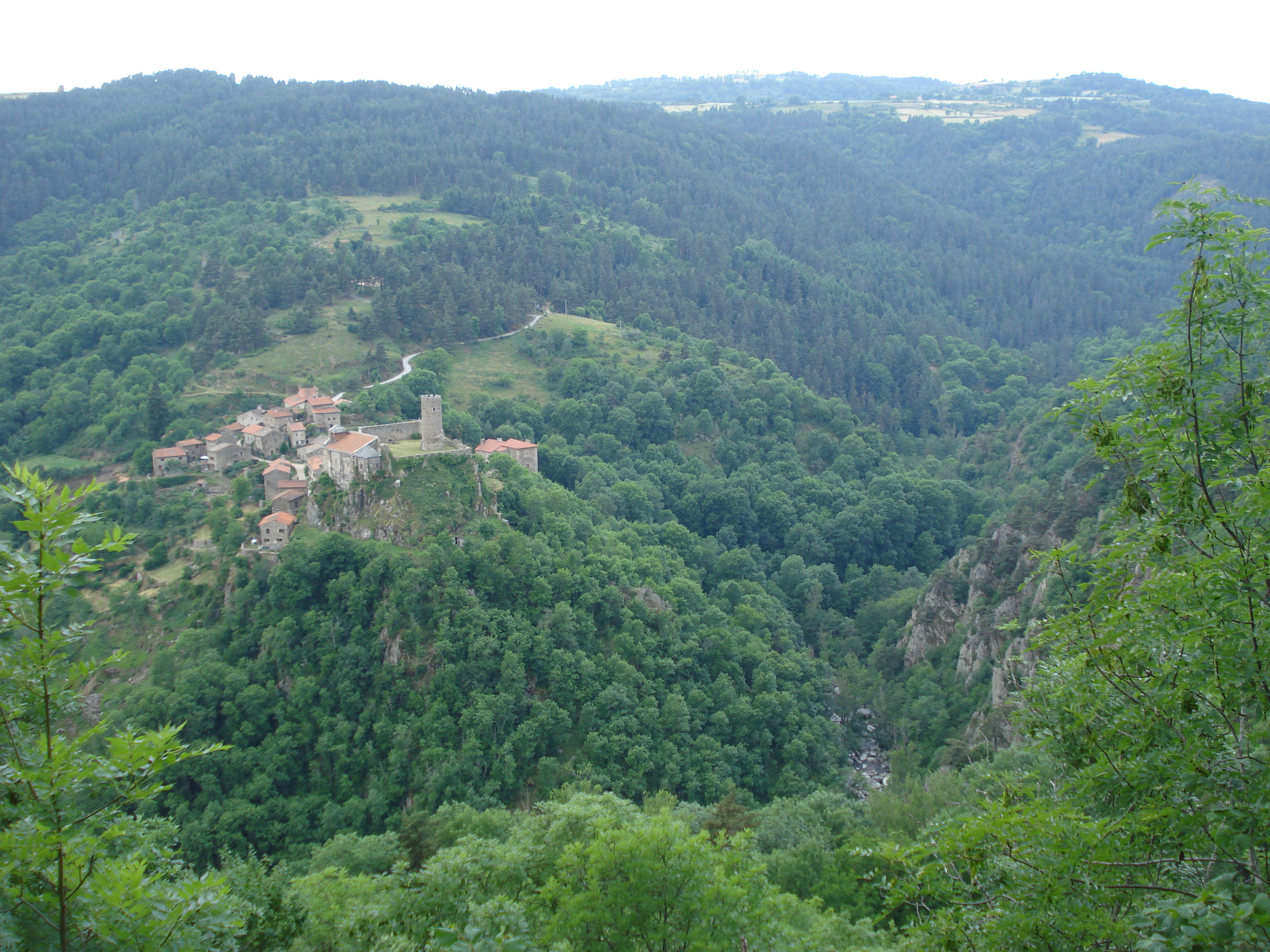
- Tiranges, overlooking the gorges of the Ance and the Château de Chalencon
- Location of Tiranges
- Location within France Location within Auvergne-Rhône-Alpes
- Coordinates: 45°18′18″N 3°59′20″E
- Country: France
- Region: Auvergne-Rhône-Alpes
- Department: Haute-Loire
- Arrondissement: Yssingeaux
- Canton: Bas-en-Basset

Government
  - Mayor (2020–2026): Christian Collange
- Area^{1}: 26.83 km^{2} (10.36 sq mi)
- Elevation: 830 m (2,720 ft)
- Highest elevation: 921 m (3,022 ft)
- Lowest elevation: 489 m (1,604 ft)
- Population (2023): 453
  - Density: 16.9/km^{2} (43.7/sq mi)
- Time zone: UTC+01:00 (CET)
  - Summer (DST): UTC+02:00 (CEST)
- INSEE/Postal code: 43246 /43530
- ^{1} French Land Register data, which excludes lakes, ponds, glaciers > 1 km^{2} (0.386 sq mi or 247 acres) and river estuaries.

Tiranges (French pronunciation: [tiʁɑ̃ʒ]) is a commune in the Haute-Loire department in south-central France.

== Population ==
Historical population
Year	Pop.	±% p.a.
1968	631	—
1975	555	−1.82%
1982	490	−1.76%
1990	420	−1.91%
1999	405	−0.40%
2007	437	+0.96%
2012	455	+0.81%
2017	479	+1.03%
2023	453	−0.93%
Source: INSEE

== Climate ==
On average, Tiranges experiences [98.1] days per year with a minimum temperature below 0 °C (32.0 °F), 3.7 days per year with a minimum temperature below −10 °C (14.0 °F), 6.6 days per year with a maximum temperature below 0 °C (32.0 °F), and 26.8 days per year with a maximum temperature above 30 °C (86.0 °F). The record high temperature was 40.2 °C (104.4 °F) on 18 July 2023, while the record low temperature was −22.0 °C (−7.6 °F) on 16 January 1985.

Climate data for Tiranges, France, 1991–2020 normals, extremes 1983–present
Month	Jan	Feb	Mar	Apr	May	Jun	Jul	Aug	Sep	Oct	Nov	Dec	Year
Record high °C (°F)	19.5 (67.1)	23.5 (74.3)	26.2 (79.2)	32.6 (90.7)	35.7 (96.3)	38.8 (101.8)	40.2 (104.4)	39.9 (103.8)	36.2 (97.2)	30.3 (86.5)	24.3 (75.7)	18.7 (65.7)	40.2 (104.4)
Mean daily maximum °C (°F)	7.2 (45.0)	8.9 (48.0)	13.1 (55.6)	16.2 (61.2)	20.2 (68.4)	24.4 (75.9)	27.0 (80.6)	27.0 (80.6)	22.2 (72.0)	17.2 (63.0)	11.1 (52.0)	7.8 (46.0)	16.9 (62.4)
Daily mean °C (°F)	2.8 (37.0)	3.6 (38.5)	6.8 (44.2)	9.4 (48.9)	13.2 (55.8)	16.9 (62.4)	19.1 (66.4)	19.0 (66.2)	15.0 (59.0)	11.3 (52.3)	6.4 (43.5)	3.5 (38.3)	10.6 (51.0)
Mean daily minimum °C (°F)	−1.5 (29.3)	−1.7 (28.9)	0.4 (32.7)	2.6 (36.7)	6.1 (43.0)	9.5 (49.1)	11.2 (52.2)	11.0 (51.8)	7.7 (45.9)	5.5 (41.9)	1.7 (35.1)	−0.8 (30.6)	4.3 (39.8)
Record low °C (°F)	−22.0 (−7.6)	−20.0 (−4.0)	−19.5 (−3.1)	−8.0 (17.6)	−3.8 (25.2)	0.0 (32.0)	2.7 (36.9)	0.5 (32.9)	−1.0 (30.2)	−8.0 (17.6)	−12.0 (10.4)	−15.5 (4.1)	−22.0 (−7.6)
Average precipitation mm (inches)	43.7 (1.72)	31.3 (1.23)	35.9 (1.41)	57.9 (2.28)	81.3 (3.20)	79.8 (3.14)	81.5 (3.21)	79.3 (3.12)	71.3 (2.81)	80.5 (3.17)	72.1 (2.84)	44.3 (1.74)	758.9 (29.87)
Average precipitation days (≥ 1.0 mm)	7.9	7.4	6.8	9.4	9.8	8.9	7.9	7.6	7.7	9.2	9.2	7.7	99.5
Source: Meteociel

== See also ==
- Communes of the Haute-Loire department
