= Boisset, Haute-Loire =

Boisset
- Commune
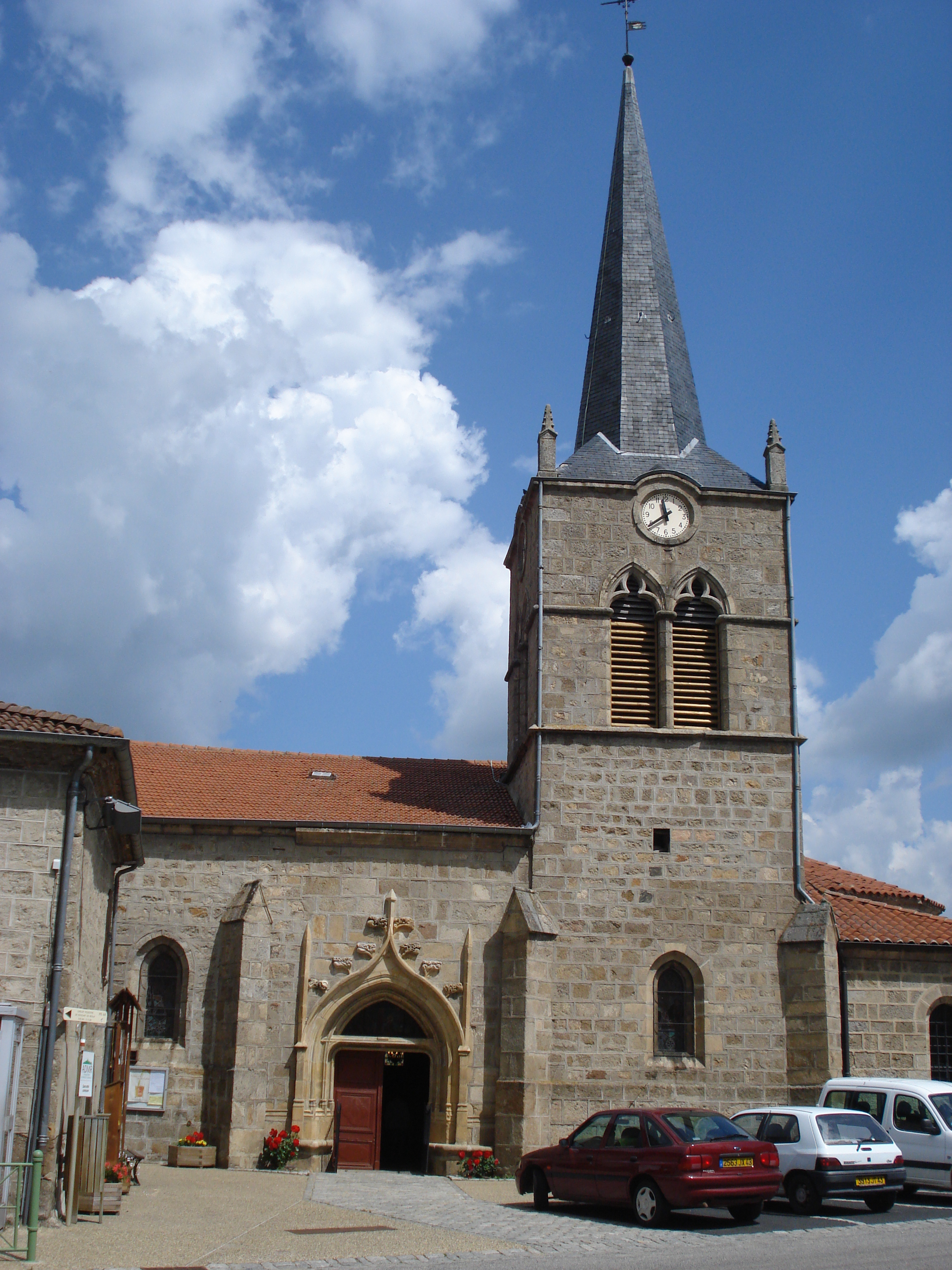
- Location of Boisset
- Location within France Location within Auvergne-Rhône-Alpes
- Coordinates: 45°19′29″N 3°59′01″E
- Country: France
- Region: Auvergne-Rhône-Alpes
- Department: Haute-Loire
- Arrondissement: Yssingeaux
- Canton: Bas-en-Basset

Government
  - Mayor (2020–2026): André Poncet
- Area^{1}: 14.04 km^{2} (5.42 sq mi)
- Elevation: 880 m (2,890 ft)
- Highest elevation: 944 m (3,097 ft)
- Lowest elevation: 590 m (1,940 ft)
- Population (2023): 394
  - Density: 28.1/km^{2} (72.7/sq mi)
- Time zone: UTC+01:00 (CET)
  - Summer (DST): UTC+02:00 (CEST)
- INSEE/Postal code: 43034 /43500
- ^{1} French Land Register data, which excludes lakes, ponds, glaciers > 1 km^{2} (0.386 sq mi or 247 acres) and river estuaries.

Boisset (French pronunciation: [bwasɛ]) is a commune in the Haute-Loire department in south-central France.

== Population ==
Historical population
Year	Pop.	±% p.a.
1968	314	—
1975	245	−3.48%
1982	197	−3.07%
1990	194	−0.19%
1999	221	+1.46%
2007	262	+2.15%
2012	315	+3.75%
2017	345	+1.84%
2023	394	+2.24%
Source: INSEE

== See also ==
- Communes of the Haute-Loire department
