= Valprivas =

- Commune
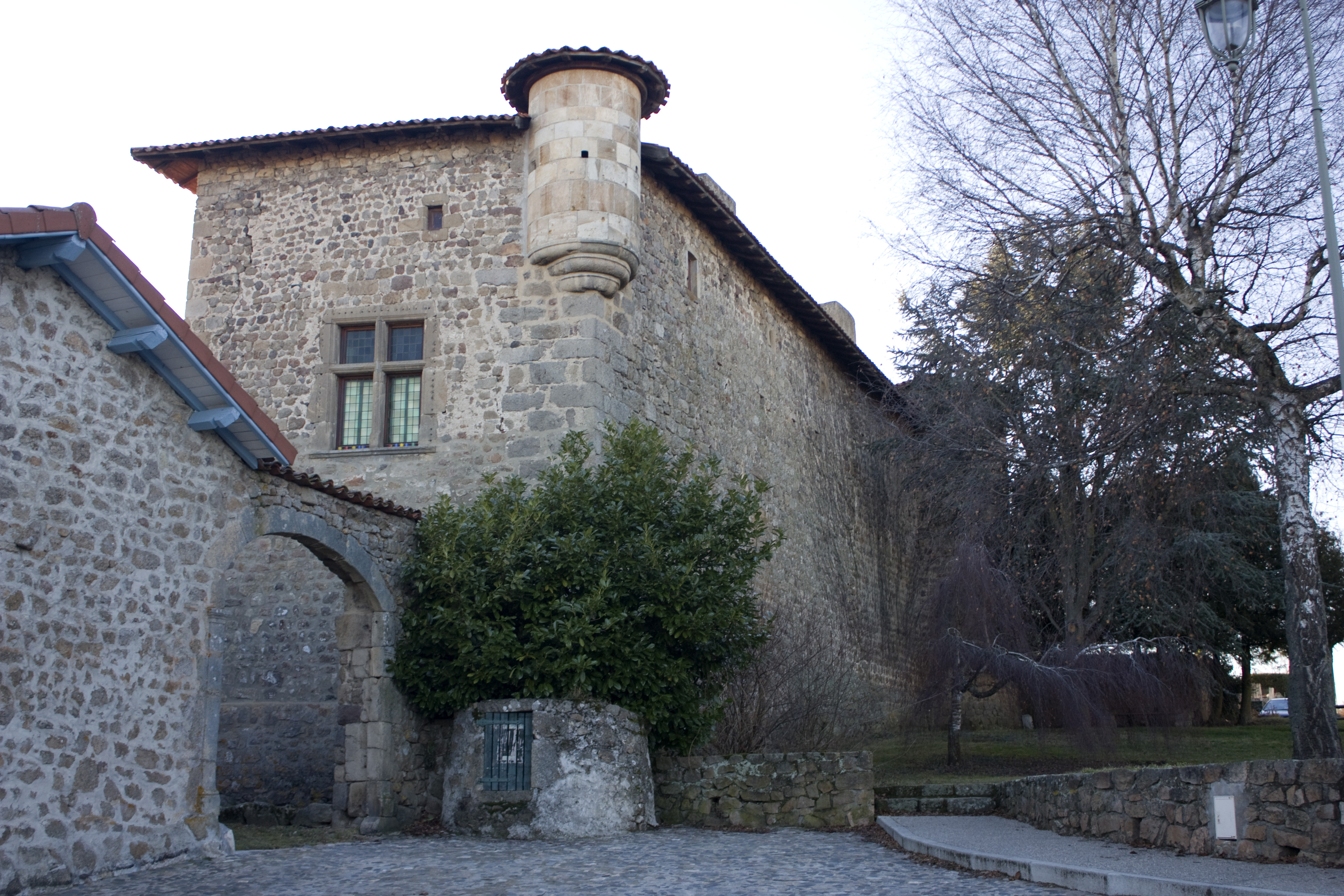
- Château of Valprivas
- Location of Valprivas
- Location within France Location within Auvergne-Rhône-Alpes
- Coordinates: 45°18′43″N 4°02′41″E
- Country: France
- Region: Auvergne-Rhône-Alpes
- Department: Haute-Loire
- Arrondissement: Yssingeaux
- Canton: Bas-en-Basset

Government
  - Mayor (2020–2026): Claudine Liothier
- Area^{1}: 23.66 km^{2} (9.14 sq mi)
- Elevation: 835 m (2,740 ft)
- Highest elevation: 953 m (3,127 ft)
- Lowest elevation: 491 m (1,611 ft)
- Population (2023): 553
  - Density: 23.4/km^{2} (60.5/sq mi)
- Time zone: UTC+01:00 (CET)
  - Summer (DST): UTC+02:00 (CEST)
- INSEE/Postal code: 43249 /43210
- ^{1} French Land Register data, which excludes lakes, ponds, glaciers > 1 km^{2} (0.386 sq mi or 247 acres) and river estuaries.

Valprivas is a commune in the Haute-Loire department in south-central France.

== Population ==
Historical population
| Year | Pop. | ±% p.a. |
|---|---|---|
| 1968 | 461 | — |
| 1975 | 405 | −1.83% |
| 1982 | 300 | −4.20% |
| 1990 | 356 | +2.16% |
| 1999 | 401 | +1.33% |
| 2007 | 482 | +2.33% |
| 2012 | 488 | +0.25% |
| 2017 | 509 | +0.85% |
| 2023 | 553 | +1.39% |
Source: INSEE

== See also ==
- Communes of the Haute-Loire department
