= Saint-Just-Malmont =

- Commune
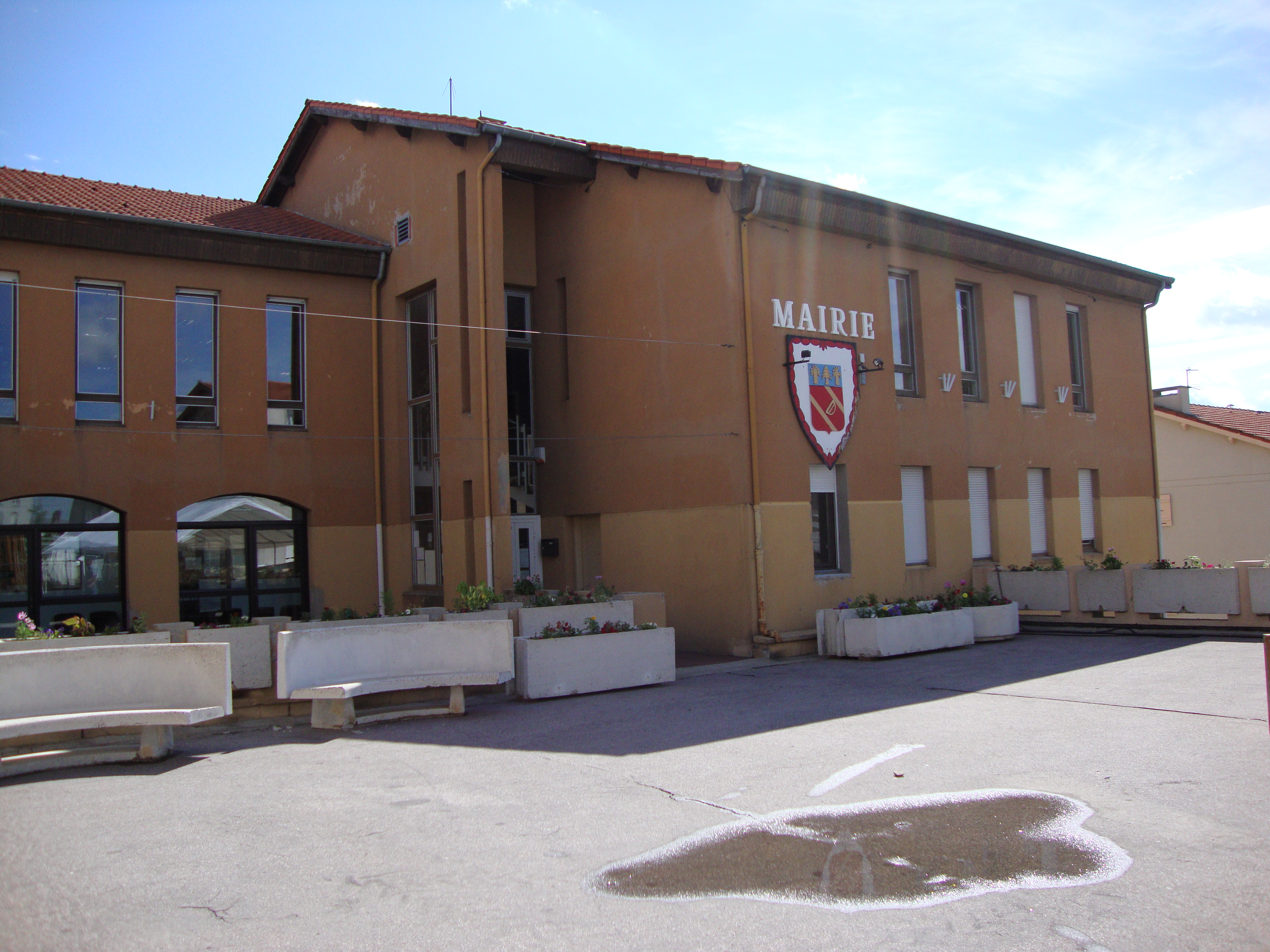
- Town hall

- Coat of arms
- Location of Saint-Just-Malmont
- Location within France Location within Auvergne-Rhône-Alpes
- Coordinates: 45°20′25″N 4°18′48″E
- Country: France
- Region: Auvergne-Rhône-Alpes
- Department: Haute-Loire
- Arrondissement: Yssingeaux
- Canton: Aurec-sur-Loire
- Intercommunality: Loire-Semène

Government
  - Mayor (2020–2026): Frédéric Girodet
- Area^{1}: 23.28 km^{2} (8.99 sq mi)
- Elevation: 840 m (2,760 ft)
- Highest elevation: 934 m (3,064 ft)
- Lowest elevation: 520 m (1,710 ft)
- Population (2023): 4,239
  - Density: 182.1/km^{2} (471.6/sq mi)
- Time zone: UTC+01:00 (CET)
  - Summer (DST): UTC+02:00 (CEST)
- INSEE/Postal code: 43205 /43240
- ^{1} French Land Register data, which excludes lakes, ponds, glaciers > 1 km^{2} (0.386 sq mi or 247 acres) and river estuaries.

Saint-Just-Malmont (French pronunciation: [sɛ̃ ʒy(st) malmɔ̃]; Occitan: Sent Just de Malmont) is a commune in the Haute-Loire department in south-central France.

== Population ==
Historical population

Year	Pop.	±% p.a.
1793	1,507	—
1821	1,662	+0.35%
1846	1,761	+0.23%
1872	2,036	+0.56%
1901	3,378	+1.76%
1926	2,676	−0.93%
1946	2,087	−1.24%
1962	2,217	+0.38%
1968	2,346	+0.95%

Year	Pop.	±% p.a.
1975	2,485	+0.83%
1982	2,885	+2.16%
1990	3,668	+3.05%
1999	3,951	+0.83%
2007	4,166	+0.66%
2012	4,164	−0.01%
2017	4,194	+0.14%
2023	4,239	+0.18%

Source: EHESS and INSEE (1968-2023)

== See also ==
- Communes of the Haute-Loire department
