= Canton of Deux Rivières et Vallées =

Coordinates: 45.24°N 4.23°E

The canton of Deux Rivières et Vallées is an administrative division of the Haute-Loire department, south-central France. It was created at the French canton reorganisation which came into effect in March 2015. Its seat is in Sainte-Sigolène.

It consists of the following communes:

1. Saint-Didier-en-Velay
2. Sainte-Sigolène
3. Saint-Pal-de-Mons
4. Saint-Victor-Malescours
5. La Séauve-sur-Semène
