= Saint-Ferréol-d'Auroure =

- Commune
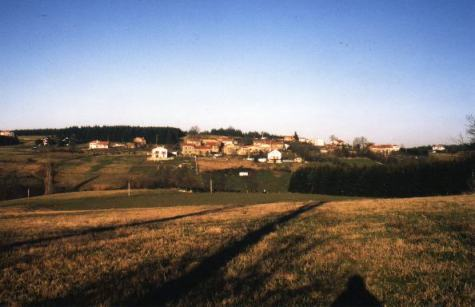

- Coat of arms
- Location of Saint-Ferréol-d'Auroure
- Location within France Location within Auvergne-Rhône-Alpes
- Coordinates: 45°21′21″N 4°15′19″E
- Country: France
- Region: Auvergne-Rhône-Alpes
- Department: Haute-Loire
- Arrondissement: Yssingeaux
- Canton: Aurec-sur-Loire
- Intercommunality: Loire-Semène

Government
  - Mayor (2020–2026): Roland Rivet
- Area^{1}: 10.85 km^{2} (4.19 sq mi)
- Elevation: 725 m (2,379 ft)
- Highest elevation: 818 m (2,684 ft)
- Lowest elevation: 457 m (1,499 ft)
- Population (2023): 2,441
  - Density: 225.0/km^{2} (582.7/sq mi)
- Time zone: UTC+01:00 (CET)
  - Summer (DST): UTC+02:00 (CEST)
- INSEE/Postal code: 43184 /43330
- ^{1} French Land Register data, which excludes lakes, ponds, glaciers > 1 km^{2} (0.386 sq mi or 247 acres) and river estuaries.

Saint-Ferréol-d'Auroure (French pronunciation: [sɛ̃ fɛʁeɔl doʁuʁ]; Occitan: Sent Ferriòu) is a commune in the Haute-Loire department in south-central France.

== Population ==
Historical population

Year	Pop.	±% p.a.
1793	966	—
1821	1,223	+0.85%
1846	1,673	+1.26%
1872	1,107	−1.58%
1901	874	−0.81%
1926	645	−1.21%
1946	606	−0.31%
1962	562	−0.47%
1968	635	+2.06%

Year	Pop.	±% p.a.
1975	859	+4.41%
1982	1,240	+5.38%
1990	1,775	+4.59%
1999	2,052	+1.62%
2007	2,182	+0.77%
2012	2,432	+2.19%
2017	2,464	+0.26%
2023	2,441	−0.16%

Source: EHESS and INSEE (1968-2023)

== See also ==
- Communes of the Haute-Loire department
