= Malvalette =

- Commune
- Location of Malvalette
- Location within France Location within Auvergne-Rhône-Alpes
- Coordinates: 45°21′20″N 4°09′34″E
- Country: France
- Region: Auvergne-Rhône-Alpes
- Department: Haute-Loire
- Arrondissement: Yssingeaux
- Canton: Bas-en-Basset

Government
  - Mayor (2020–2026): Jean-Philippe Montagnon
- Area^{1}: 21.01 km^{2} (8.11 sq mi)
- Elevation: 580 m (1,900 ft)
- Highest elevation: 846 m (2,776 ft)
- Lowest elevation: 418 m (1,371 ft)
- Population (2023): 887
  - Density: 42.2/km^{2} (109/sq mi)
- Time zone: UTC+01:00 (CET)
  - Summer (DST): UTC+02:00 (CEST)
- INSEE/Postal code: 43127 /43210
- ^{1} French Land Register data, which excludes lakes, ponds, glaciers > 1 km^{2} (0.386 sq mi or 247 acres) and river estuaries.

Malvalette (French pronunciation: [malvalɛt]; Arpitan: Màlvàlèt) is a commune in the Haute-Loire department in south-central France.

== Population ==
Historical population
Year	Pop.	±% p.a.
1968	257	—
1975	262	+0.28%
1982	292	+1.56%
1990	345	+2.11%
1999	421	+2.24%
2007	638	+5.33%
2012	782	+4.15%
2017	835	+1.32%
2023	887	+1.01%
Source: INSEE

== See also ==
- Communes of the Haute-Loire department
