= Saint-Victor-Malescours =

- Commune
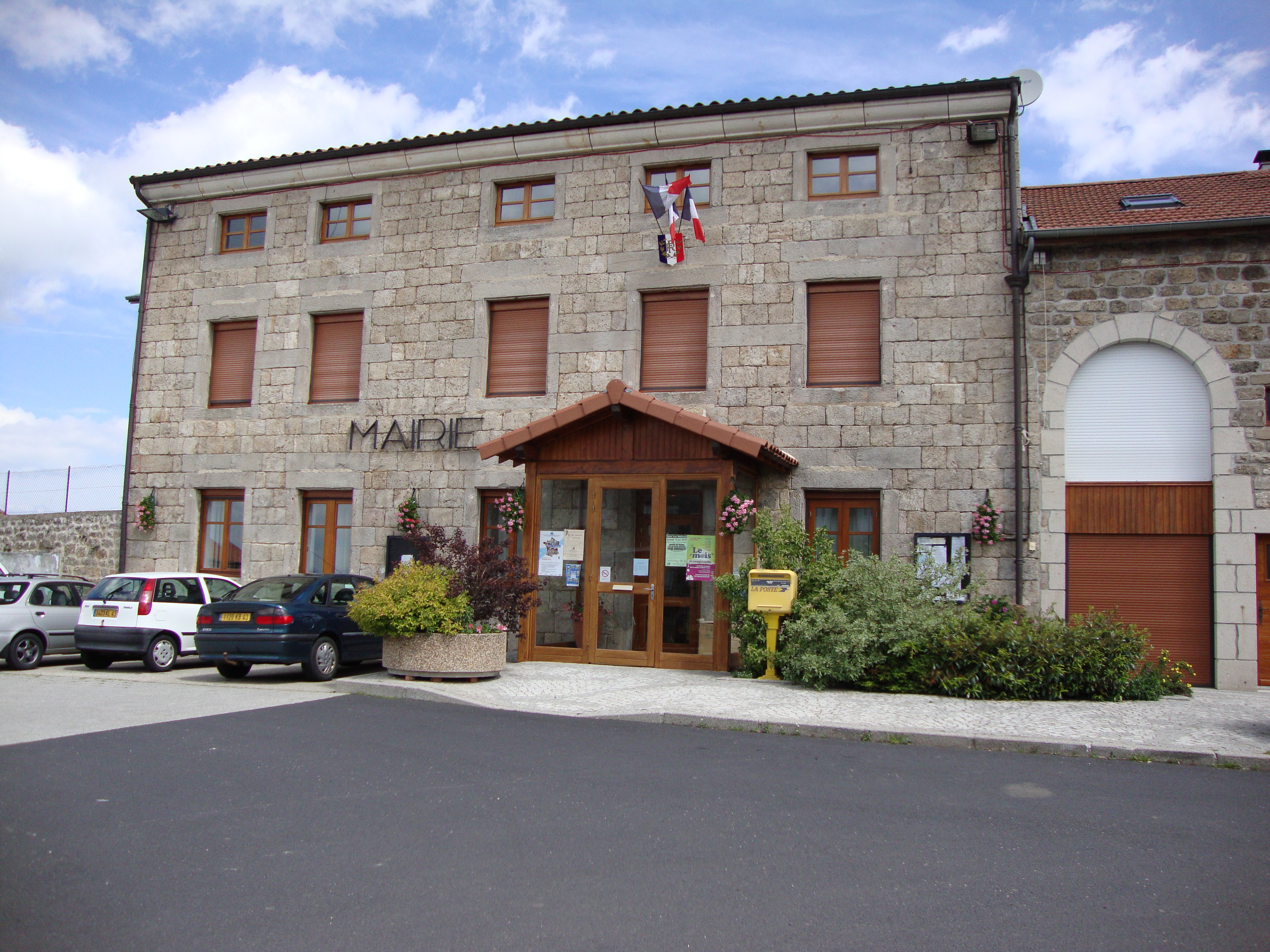
- Town hall
- Location of Saint-Victor-Malescours
- Location within France Location within Auvergne-Rhône-Alpes
- Coordinates: 45°17′33″N 4°18′47″E
- Country: France
- Region: Auvergne-Rhône-Alpes
- Department: Haute-Loire
- Arrondissement: Yssingeaux
- Canton: Deux Rivières et Vallées
- Intercommunality: Loire-Semène

Government
  - Mayor (2020–2026): Yves Bompuis
- Area^{1}: 14.47 km^{2} (5.59 sq mi)
- Elevation: 872 m (2,861 ft)
- Highest elevation: 931 m (3,054 ft)
- Lowest elevation: 753 m (2,470 ft)
- Population (2023): 798
  - Density: 55.1/km^{2} (143/sq mi)
- Time zone: UTC+01:00 (CET)
  - Summer (DST): UTC+02:00 (CEST)
- INSEE/Postal code: 43227 /43140
- ^{1} French Land Register data, which excludes lakes, ponds, glaciers > 1 km^{2} (0.386 sq mi or 247 acres) and river estuaries.

Saint-Victor-Malescours is a commune in the Haute-Loire department in south-central France.

== Population ==
Historical population
Year	Pop.	±% p.a.
1968	411	—
1975	356	−2.03%
1982	375	+0.75%
1990	476	+3.03%
1999	673	+3.92%
2007	742	+1.23%
2012	834	+2.37%
2017	818	−0.39%
2023	798	−0.41%
Source: INSEE

== See also ==
- Communes of the Haute-Loire department
