= La Séauve-sur-Semène =

- Commune
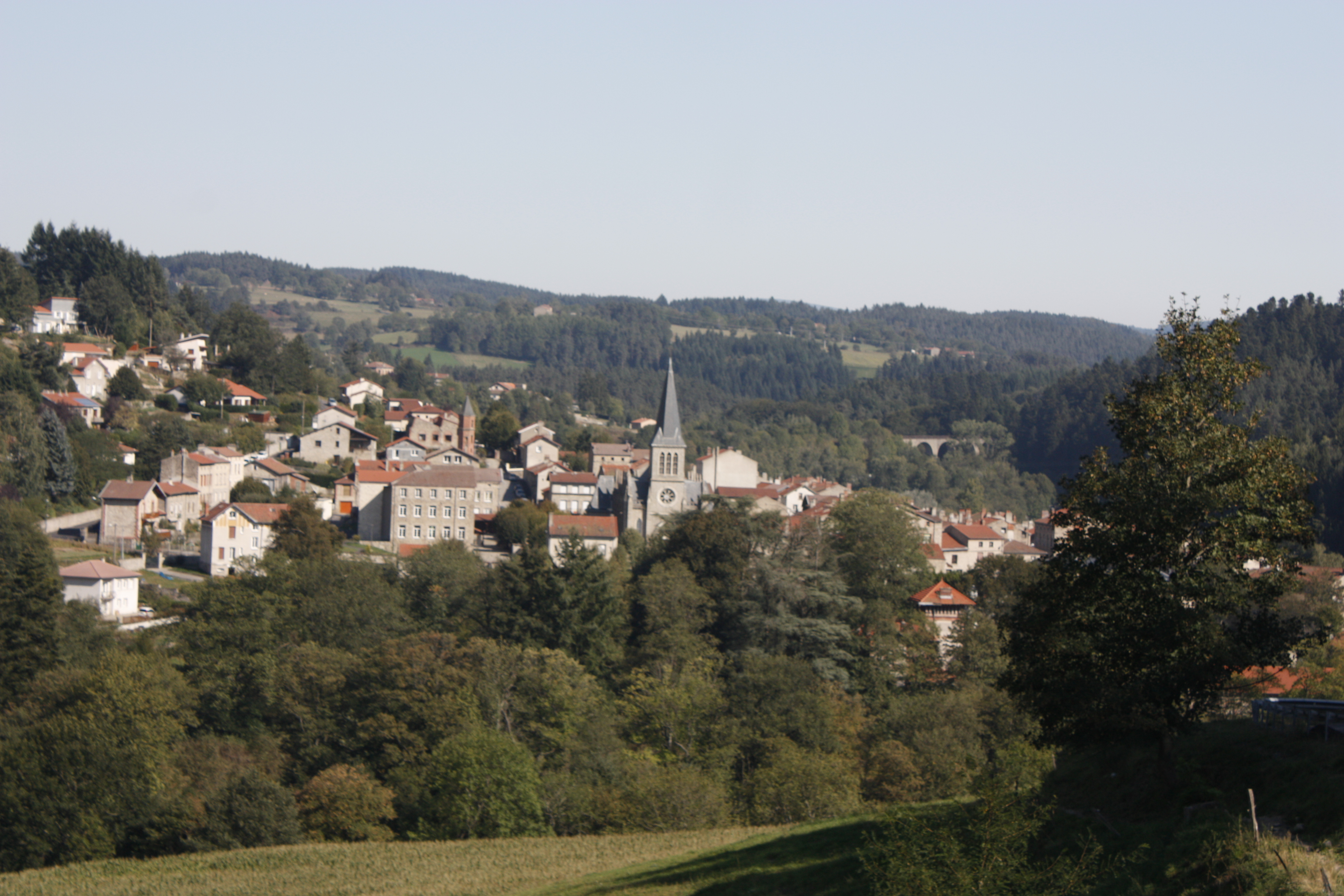
- Location of La Séauve-sur-Semène
- Location within France Location within Auvergne-Rhône-Alpes
- Coordinates: 45°17′47″N 4°15′03″E
- Country: France
- Region: Auvergne-Rhône-Alpes
- Department: Haute-Loire
- Arrondissement: Yssingeaux
- Canton: Deux Rivières et Vallées

Government
  - Mayor (2020–2026): Bruno Marcon
- Area^{1}: 7.86 km^{2} (3.03 sq mi)
- Elevation: 700 m (2,300 ft)
- Highest elevation: 865 m (2,838 ft)
- Lowest elevation: 657 m (2,156 ft)
- Population (2023): 1,456
  - Density: 185/km^{2} (480/sq mi)
- Time zone: UTC+01:00 (CET)
  - Summer (DST): UTC+02:00 (CEST)
- INSEE/Postal code: 43236 /43140
- ^{1} French Land Register data, which excludes lakes, ponds, glaciers > 1 km^{2} (0.386 sq mi or 247 acres) and river estuaries.

La Séauve-sur-Semène (French pronunciation: [la seov syʁ səmɛn]; Occitan: La Seauva) is a commune in the Haute-Loire department in south-central France.

== Population ==
Historical population
Year	Pop.	±% p.a.
1968	1,188	—
1975	1,021	−2.14%
1982	1,018	−0.04%
1990	1,074	+0.67%
1999	1,095	+0.22%
2007	1,262	+1.79%
2012	1,453	+2.86%
2017	1,470	+0.23%
2023	1,456	−0.16%
Source: INSEE

== See also ==
- Communes of the Haute-Loire department
