= Aurec-sur-Loire =

- Commune
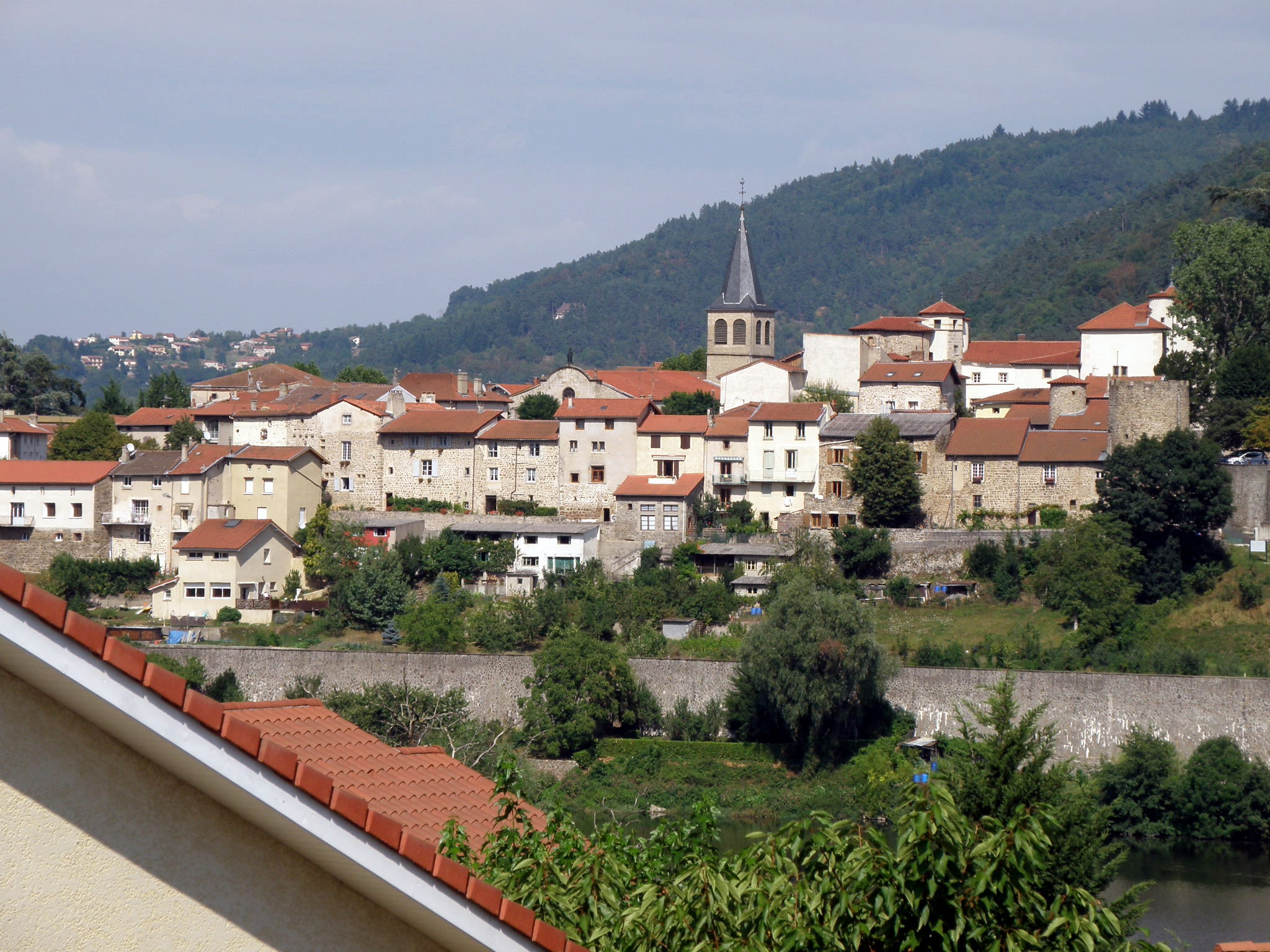

- Coat of arms
- Location of Aurec-sur-Loire
- Location within France Location within Auvergne-Rhône-Alpes
- Coordinates: 45°22′12″N 4°12′09″E
- Country: France
- Region: Auvergne-Rhône-Alpes
- Department: Haute-Loire
- Arrondissement: Yssingeaux
- Canton: Aurec-sur-Loire
- Intercommunality: Loire et Semène

Government
  - Mayor (2020–2026): Claude Vial
- Area^{1}: 22.44 km^{2} (8.66 sq mi)
- Elevation: 432 m (1,417 ft)
- Highest elevation: 821 m (2,694 ft)
- Lowest elevation: 414 m (1,358 ft)
- Population (2023): 6,164
  - Density: 274.7/km^{2} (711.4/sq mi)
- Time zone: UTC+01:00 (CET)
  - Summer (DST): UTC+02:00 (CEST)
- INSEE/Postal code: 43012 /43110
- ^{1} French Land Register data, which excludes lakes, ponds, glaciers > 1 km^{2} (0.386 sq mi or 247 acres) and river estuaries.

Aurec-sur-Loire (French pronunciation: [oʁɛk syʁ lwaʁ], literally Aurec on Loire; Occitan: Aurec) is a commune in the Haute-Loire department in south-central France.

== Population ==
Historical population

Year	Pop.	±% p.a.
1793	2,104	—
1800	1,896	−1.48%
1806	2,113	+1.82%
1821	2,407	+0.87%
1831	2,570	+0.66%
1836	2,575	+0.04%
1841	2,591	+0.12%
1846	2,710	+0.90%
1851	2,700	−0.07%
1856	2,812	+0.82%
1861	2,829	+0.12%
1866	2,455	−2.80%
1872	2,531	+0.51%
1876	2,613	+0.80%
1881	2,674	+0.46%
1886	2,599	−0.57%
1891	2,511	−0.69%
1896	2,232	−2.33%
1901	2,568	+2.84%

Year	Pop.	±% p.a.
1906	2,801	+1.75%
1911	2,591	−1.55%
1921	2,095	−2.10%
1926	2,234	+1.29%
1931	2,609	+3.15%
1936	2,668	+0.45%
1946	2,609	−0.22%
1954	2,745	+0.64%
1962	3,106	+1.56%
1968	3,620	+2.59%
1975	3,975	+1.35%
1982	4,248	+0.95%
1990	4,510	+0.75%
1999	4,895	+0.91%
2007	5,340	+1.09%
2012	5,804	+1.68%
2017	6,111	+1.04%
2023	6,164	+0.14%

Source: EHESS and INSEE (1968-2023)

== Galleries ==
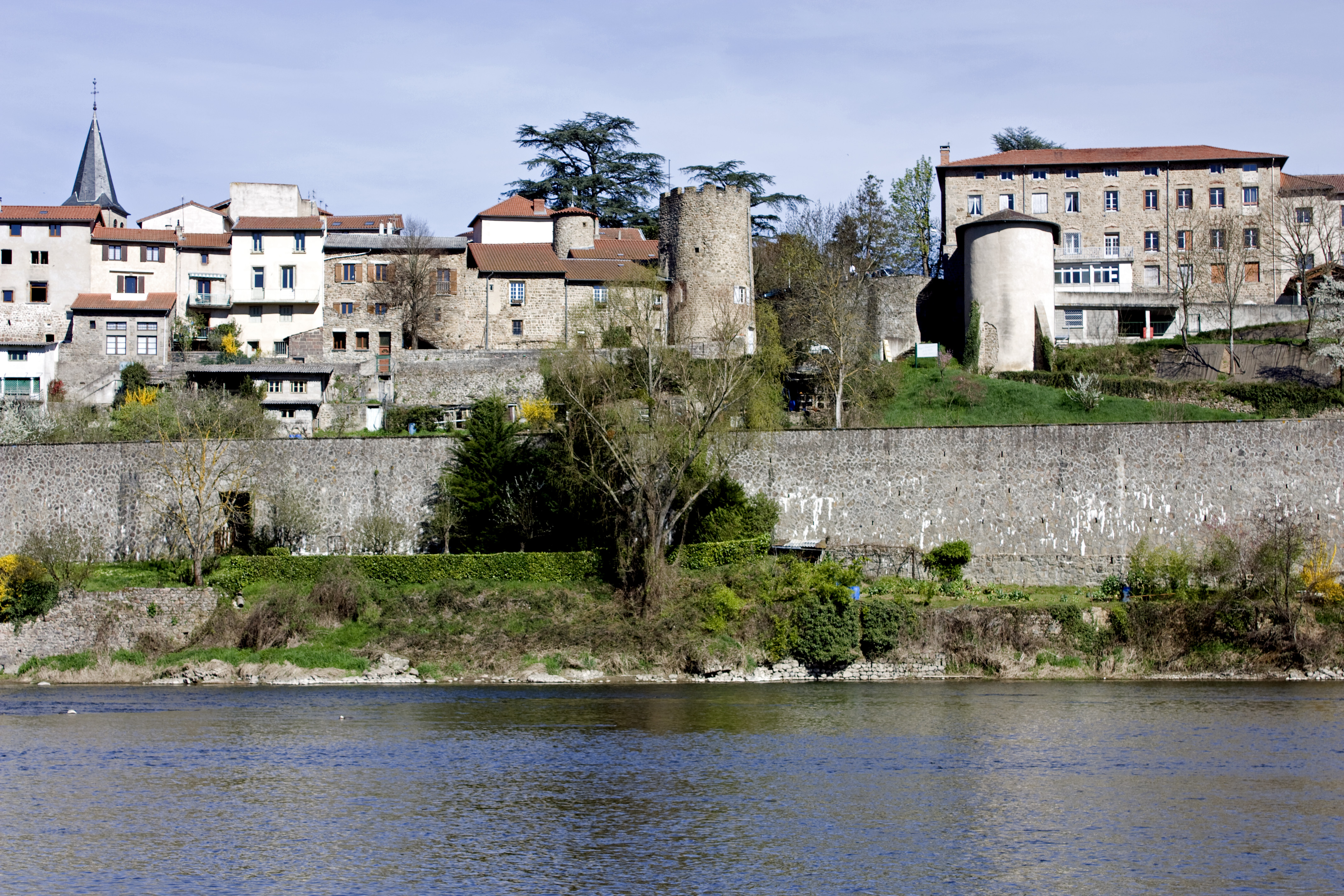
Ramparts.

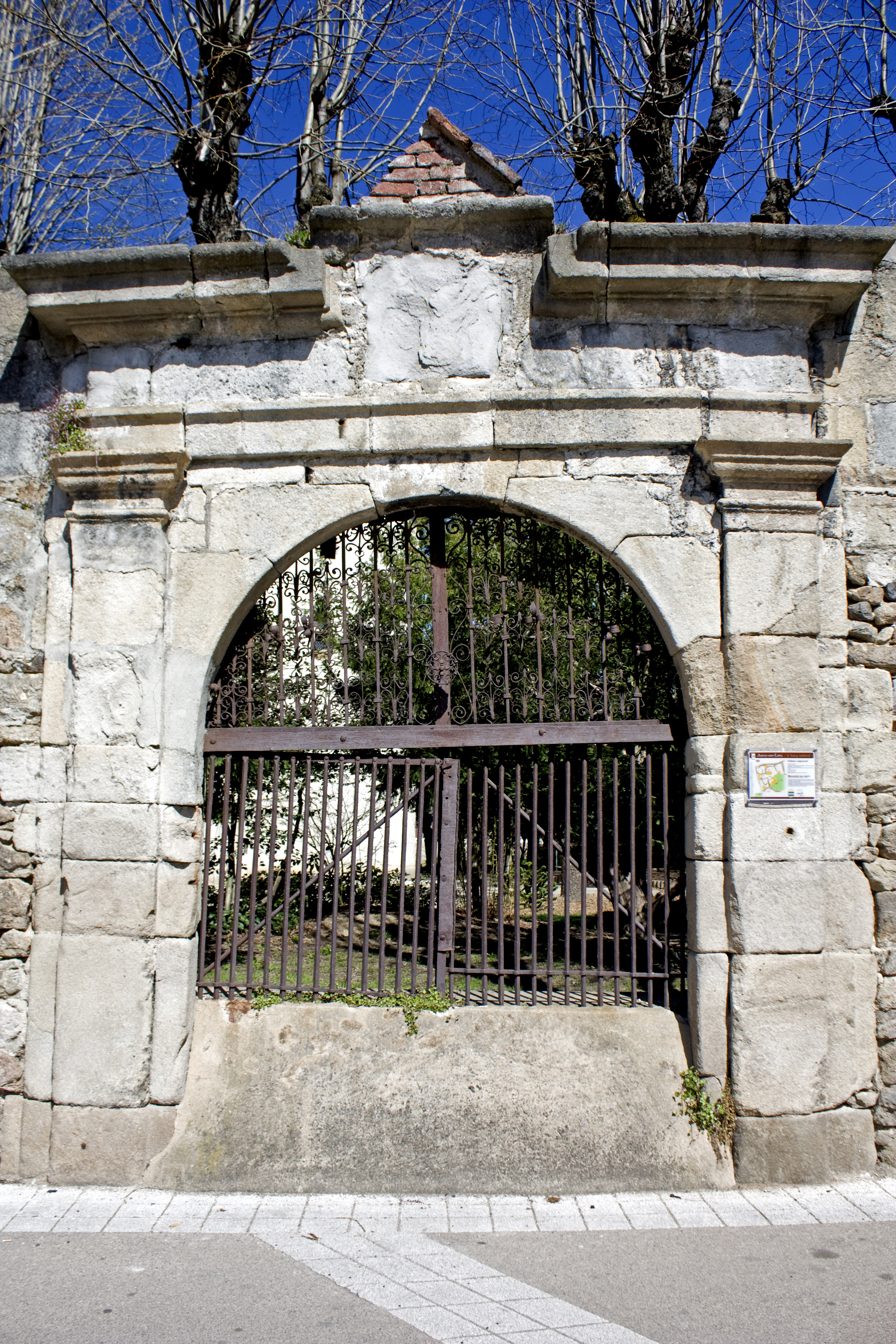
Former doorway to the Castle.

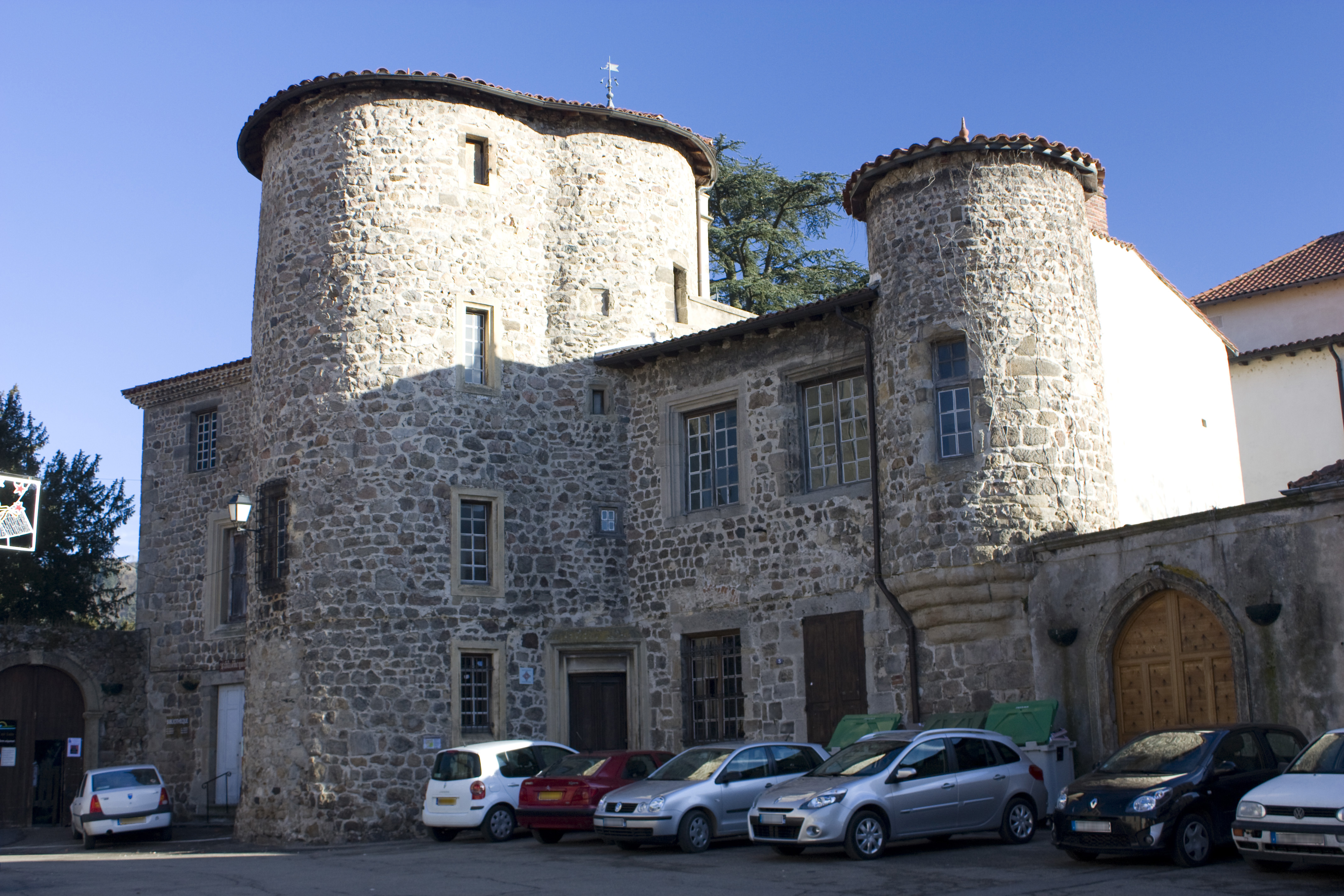
North face

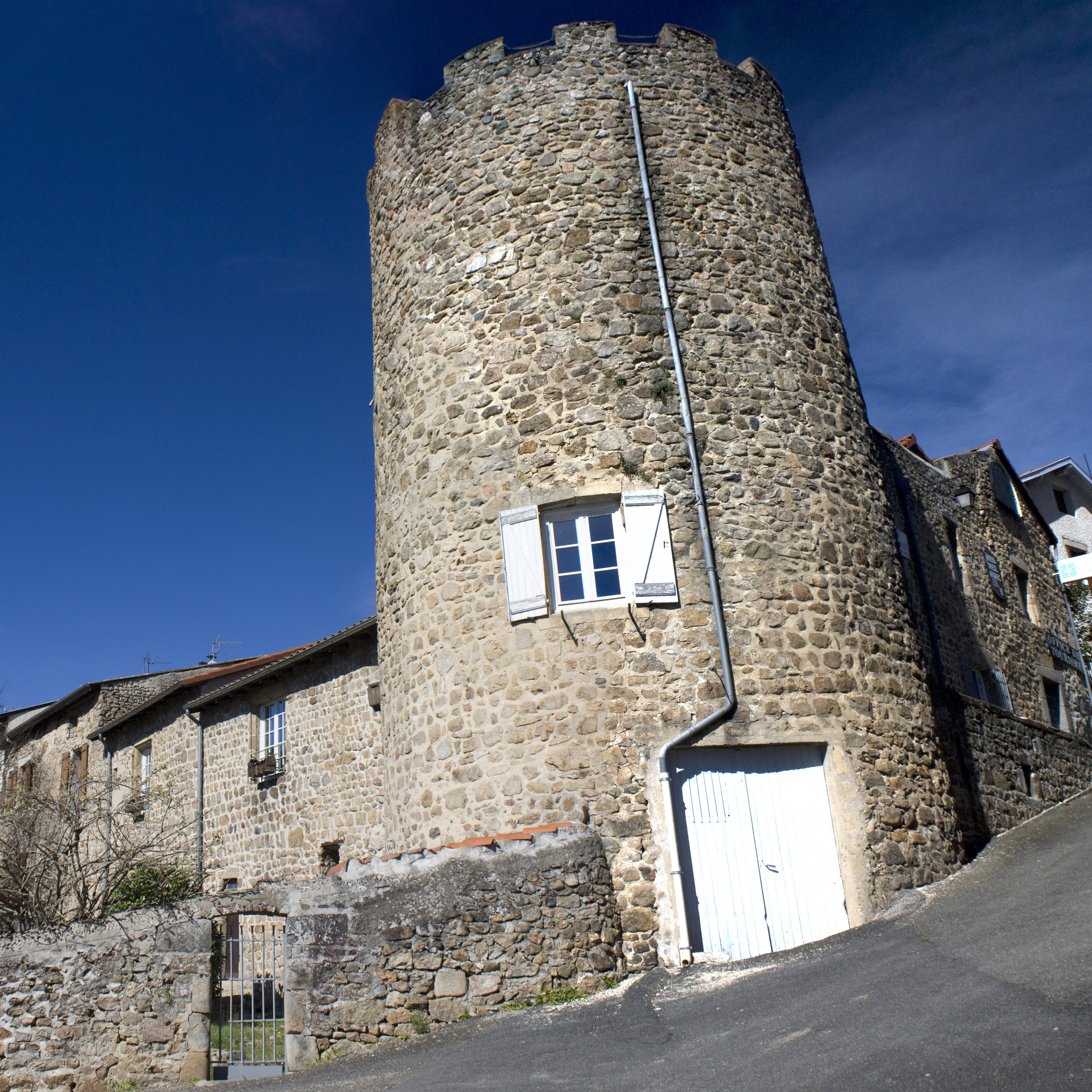
Tower of the Burgundians.

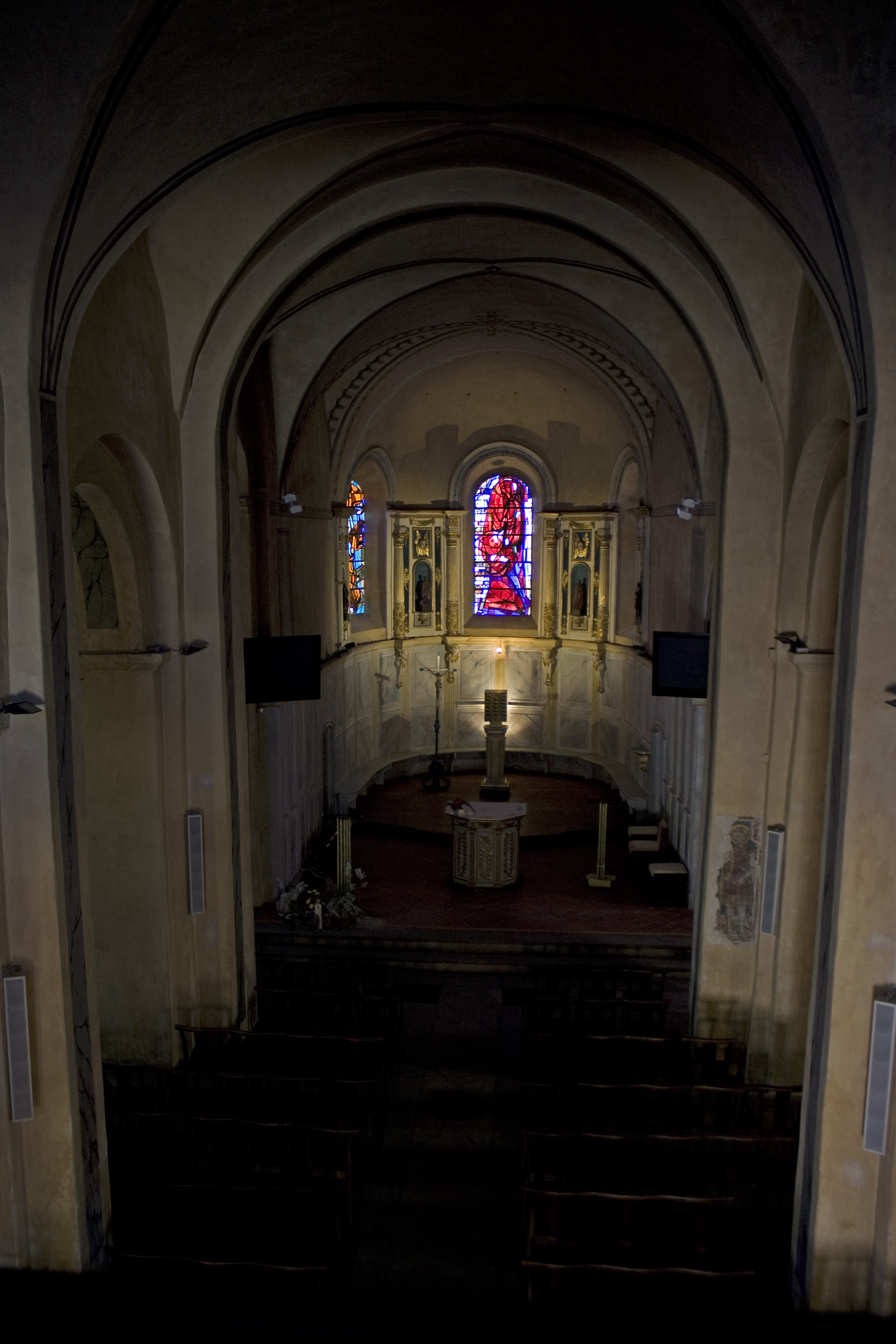
Nave.

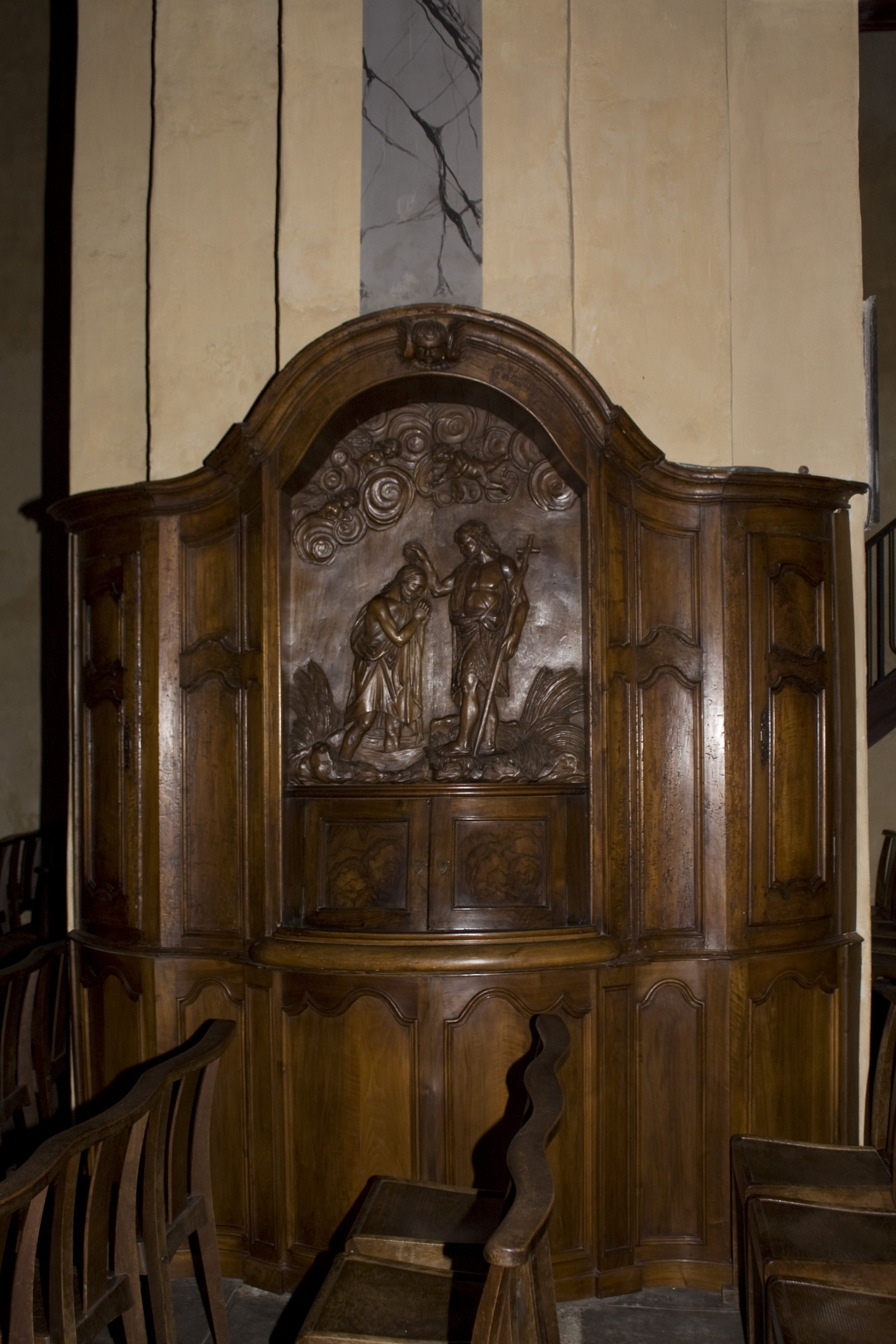
Baptismal Fonts

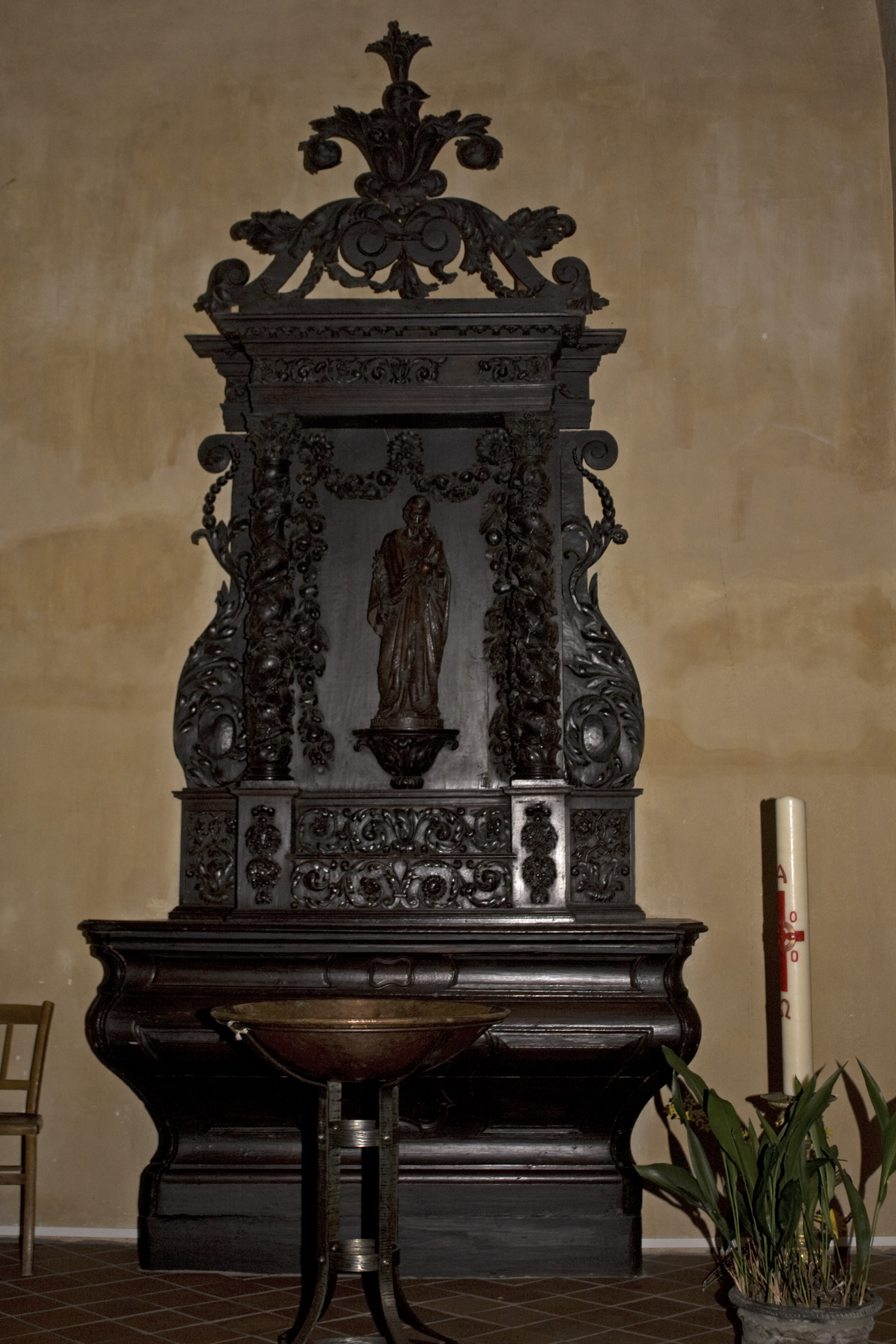
Altar and altarpiece.

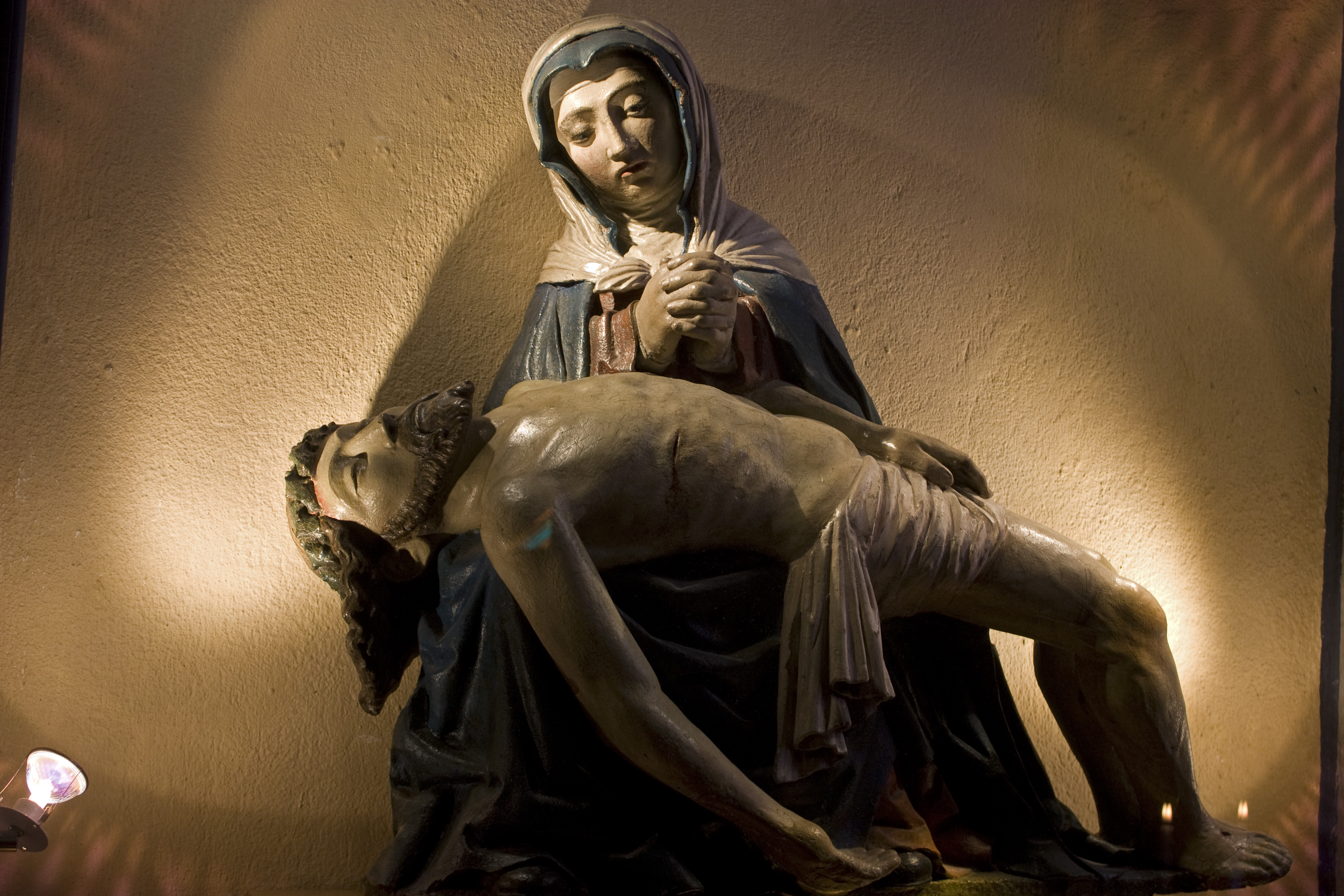
Pieta.

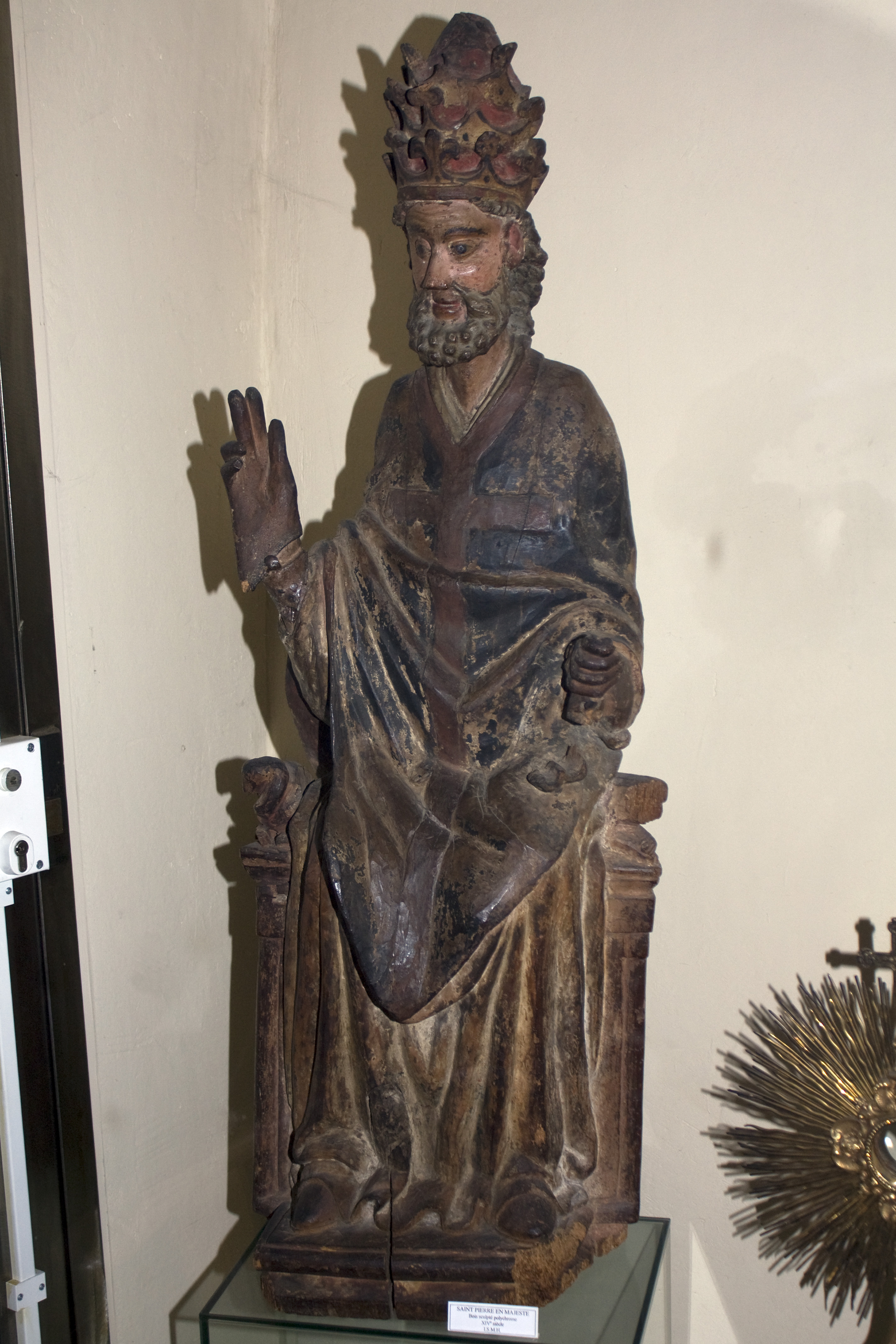
St. Peter.

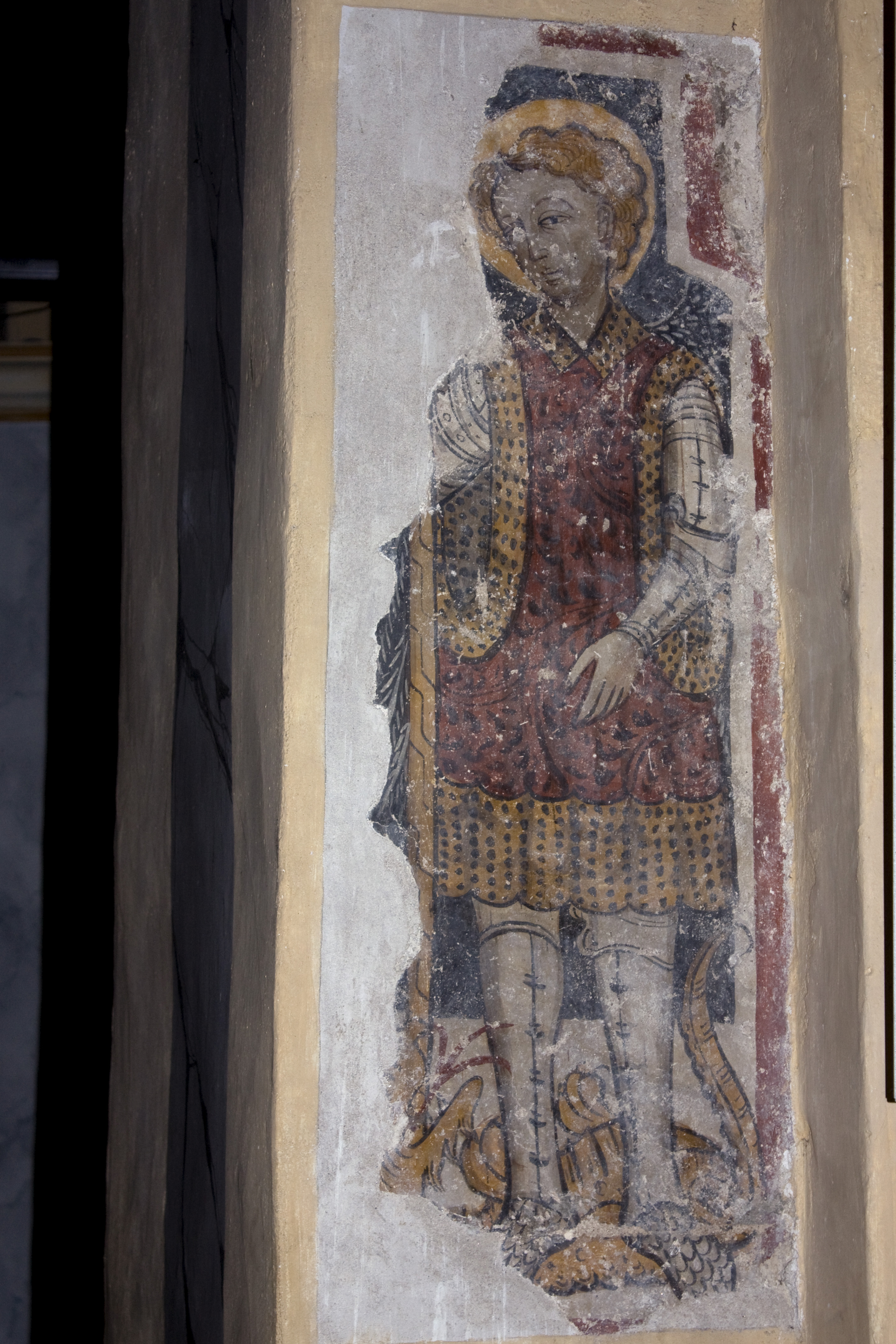
St. Michael.

== See also ==
- Communes of the Haute-Loire department
