= Saint-André-de-Chalencon =

- Commune
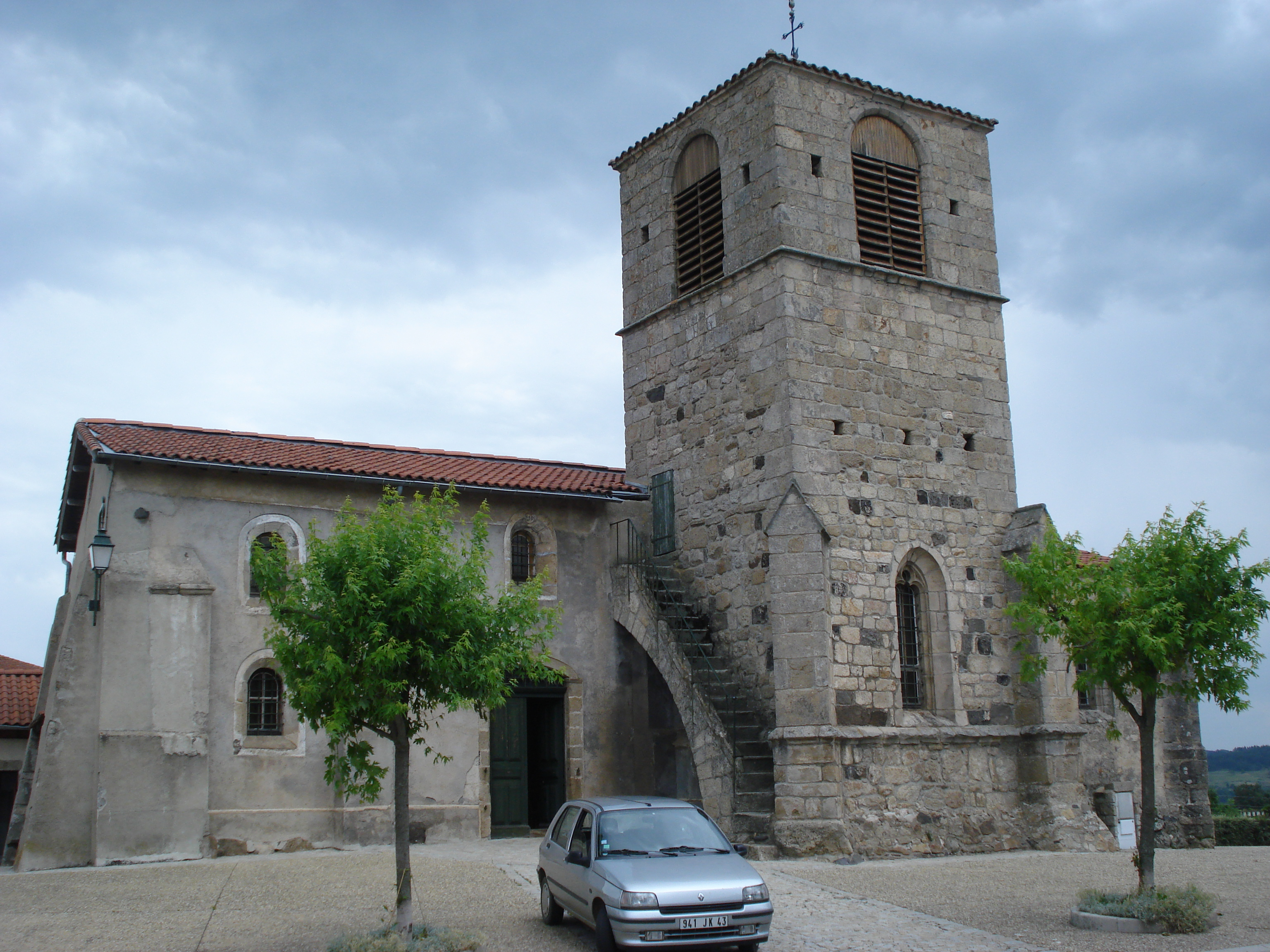
- Location of Saint-André-de-Chalencon
- Location within France Location within Auvergne-Rhône-Alpes
- Coordinates: 45°16′25″N 3°58′14″E
- Country: France
- Region: Auvergne-Rhône-Alpes
- Department: Haute-Loire
- Arrondissement: Yssingeaux
- Canton: Bas-en-Basset

Government
  - Mayor (2020–2026): Xavier Delpy
- Area^{1}: 17.2 km^{2} (6.6 sq mi)
- Elevation: 830 m (2,720 ft)
- Highest elevation: 969 m (3,179 ft)
- Lowest elevation: 549 m (1,801 ft)
- Population (2023): 374
  - Density: 21.7/km^{2} (56.3/sq mi)
- Time zone: UTC+01:00 (CET)
  - Summer (DST): UTC+02:00 (CEST)
- INSEE/Postal code: 43166 /43130
- ^{1} French Land Register data, which excludes lakes, ponds, glaciers > 1 km^{2} (0.386 sq mi or 247 acres) and river estuaries.

Saint-André-de-Chalencon (French pronunciation: [sɛ̃.t‿ɑ̃dʁe də ʃalɑ̃kɔ̃]; Occitan: Sent Andrieu de Chalencon) is a commune in the Haute-Loire department in south-central France.

== Population ==
Historical population
Year	Pop.	±% p.a.
1968	449	—
1975	329	−4.35%
1982	343	+0.60%
1990	271	−2.90%
1999	278	+0.28%
2007	342	+2.62%
2012	341	−0.06%
2017	356	+0.86%
2023	374	+0.83%
Source: INSEE

== See also ==
- Communes of the Haute-Loire department
