= Canton of Aurec-sur-Loire =

Coordinates: 45.37°N 4.20°E

The canton of Aurec-sur-Loire is an administrative division of the Haute-Loire department, south-central France. Its borders were modified at the French canton reorganisation which came into effect in March 2015. Its seat is in Aurec-sur-Loire.

It consists of the following communes:

1. Aurec-sur-Loire
2. Pont-Salomon
3. Saint-Ferréol-d'Auroure
4. Saint-Just-Malmont
