= Canton of Bas-en-Basset =

Coordinates: 45.31°N 4.11°E

The canton of Bas-en-Basset is an administrative division of the Haute-Loire department, south-central France. Its borders were modified at the French canton reorganisation which came into effect in March 2015. Its seat is in Bas-en-Basset.

It consists of the following communes:

1. Bas-en-Basset
2. Beauzac
3. Boisset
4. Malvalette
5. Retournac
6. Saint-André-de-Chalencon
7. Solignac-sous-Roche
8. Tiranges
9. Valprivas
