= Louis-Jean-Baptiste-Joseph Julliard =

French bishop

Louis-Jean-Baptiste-Joseph Julliard SM
- Bishop of Port-Vila
- Church: Catholic Church
- Diocese: Diocese of Port-Vila
- In office: 1 January 1955 – 21 May 1976
- Predecessor: Jules Halbert
- Successor: Francis-Roland Lambert
- Previous post: Titular Bishop of Vulturia (1955-1966)

Orders
- Ordination: 28 March 1936
- Consecration: 7 August 1955 by Édouard Bresson

Personal details
- Born: 13 March 1912 Coubon, Haute-Loire, France
- Died: 13 February 1984 (aged 71)

Louis-Jean-Baptiste-Joseph Julliard (13 March 1912 – 13 February 1984) was a French clergyman and bishop for the Roman Catholic Diocese of Port-Vila. He became ordained in 1936. Julliard was born in Coubon. He was appointed bishop in 1955. He died on 13 February 1984.
