= Cathedral of Our Lady of the Assumption, Mata-Utu =

Mata'utu Cathedral
- Cathedral of Our Lady of the Assumption, Mata-Utu
- Our Lady of Good Hope Cathedral
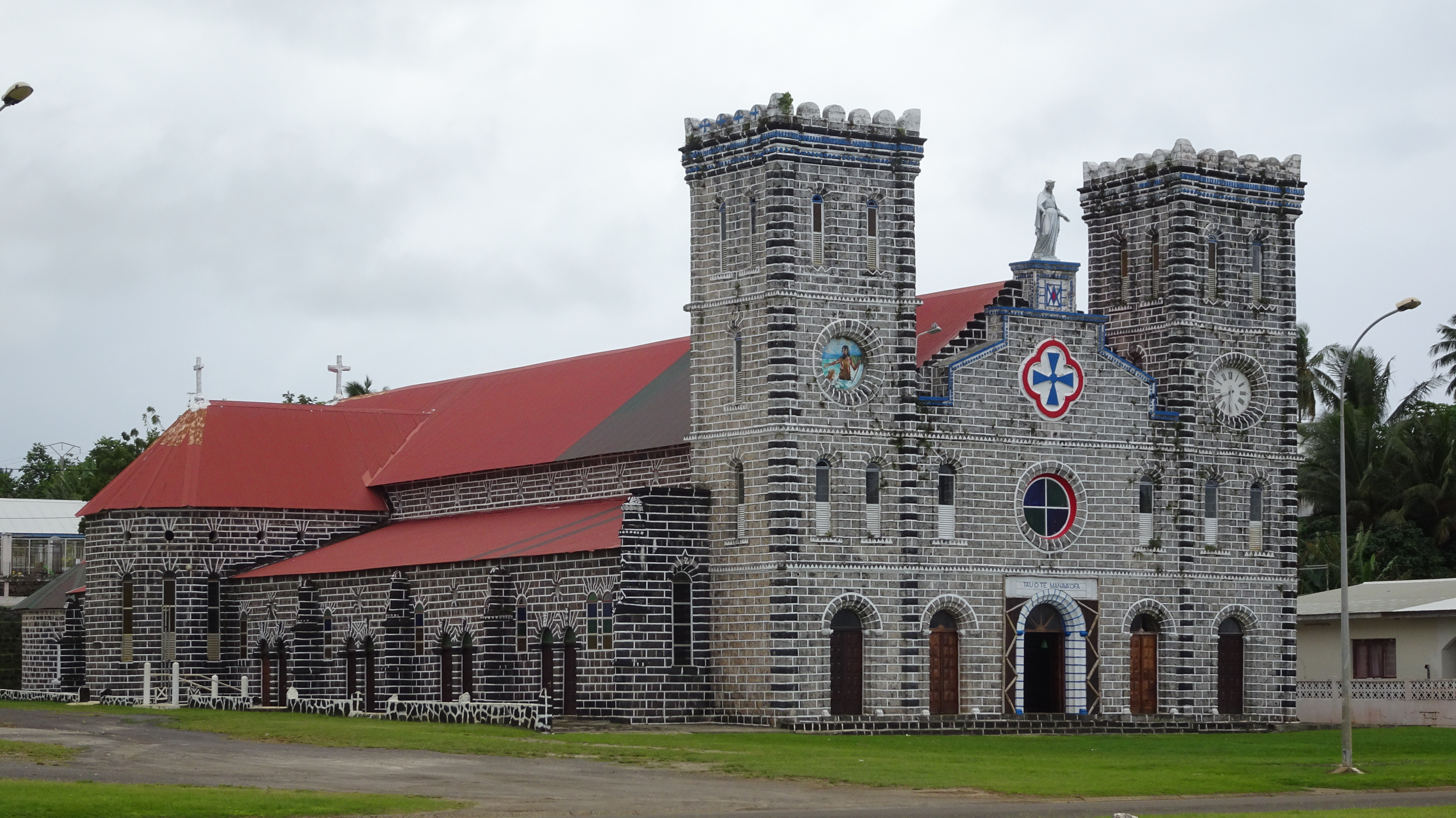

- Location within Wallis
- 13°16′58″S 176°10′24″W
- Country: Wallis and Futuna, France
- Denomination: Roman Catholic

History
- Status: Cathedral
- Dedication: Our Lady of the Assumption

Architecture
- Functional status: Active

Administration
- Archdiocese: Archdiocese of Nouméa
- Diocese: Diocese of Wallis et Futuna

Clergy
- Bishop: Susitino Sionepoe

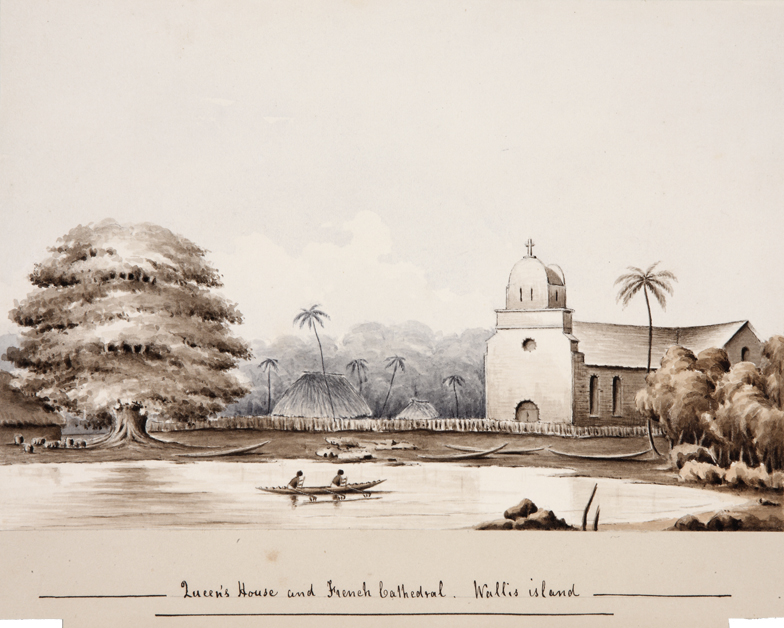
View of earlier cathedral, in 1862

Cathedral of Our Lady of the Assumption (French: Cathédrale Notre-Dame-de-l'Assomption de Matâ'Utu), also known as Matâ'Utu Cathedral, is a Roman Catholic cathedral, and a national monument of France, located in the town of Mata Utu on Uvea, in Wallis and Futuna. It is a dominant edifice in downtown Mata-Utu town, capital of Wallis Island. It bears the royal insignia of Wallis, a Maltese cross between its towers. The cathedral is also known as the "Our Lady of Good Hope Cathedral". It is the seat of Bishop Susitino Sionepoe.

== Geography ==
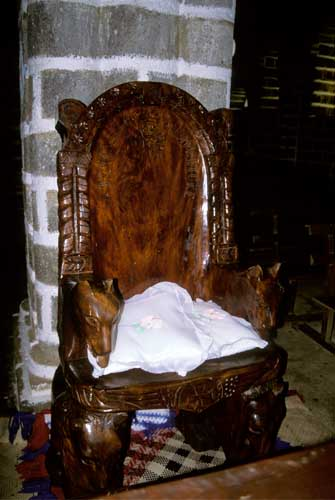
Royal throne of Uvéa, in the cathedral

The cathedral overlooks the Wallis lagoon from Mata-Utu, which is the largest town and capital of Wallis Island and the territory as a whole. The Palace of the King of Uvéa, which features two-storey verandas, adjoins the cathedral. On the opposite side of the wharf is a platform known as Fale Fono which was used by Chief of the local tribes to address people. Several restaurants, markets, hotels and the post office are near the cathedral.

== Features ==
The massive stone cathedral was built by the Marists, a French Roman Catholic religious order.

The imposing cathedral is built with blue volcanic stones, chiseled and trimmed by hand. It has two prominent towers, rectangular in shape, dominating the landscape near the wharf. Between the two towers, a blue Maltese cross has been affixed, which also appears on the flag of Wallis. The massive cathedral structure represents a distinctive "bulwark of Gaulish Catholicism". In 1951, construction of a coral block cathedral began.
