= Religion in Vanuatu =

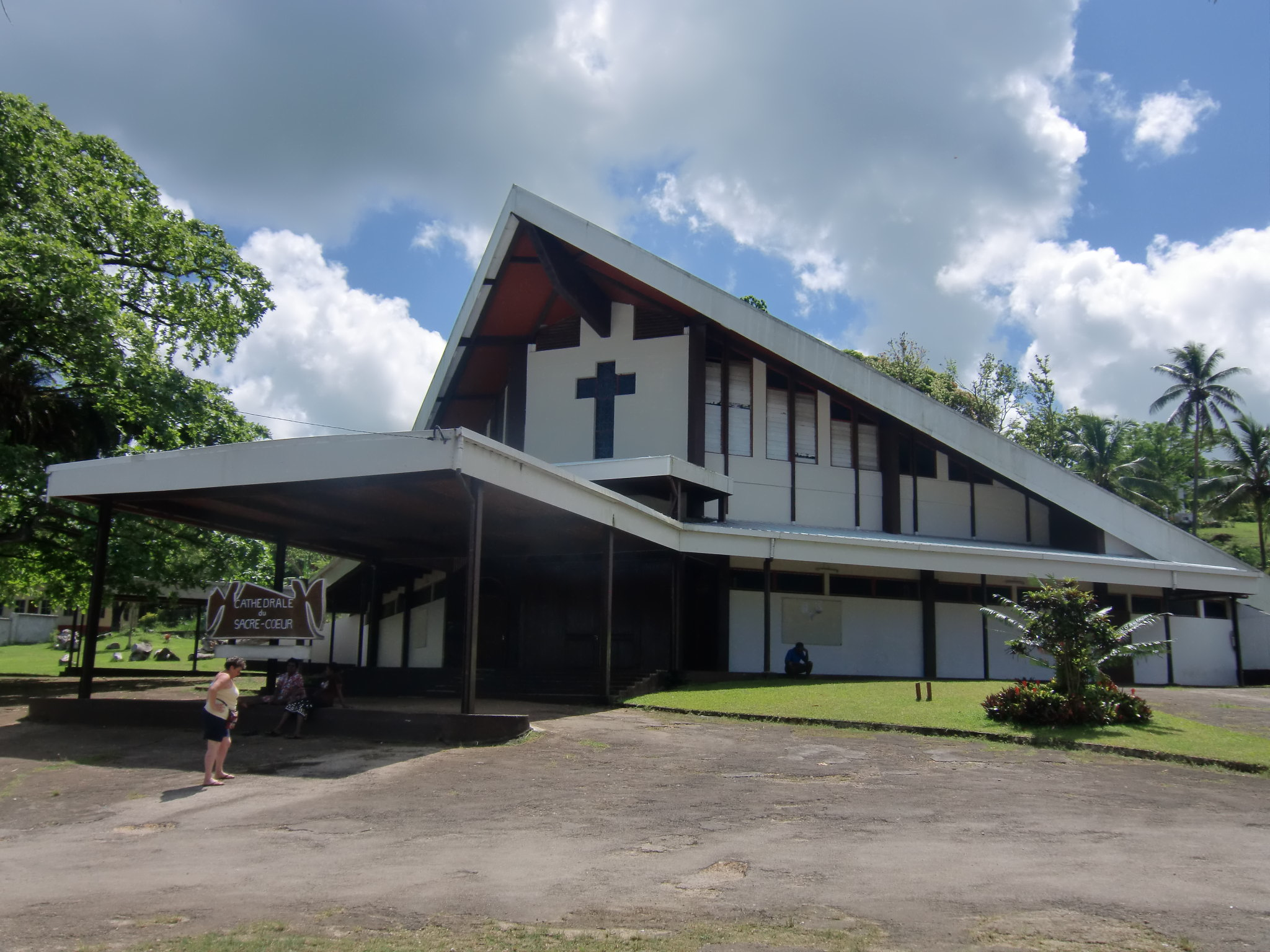
Sacred Heart Cathedral in Port Vila

Christianity is the largest religion in Vanuatu.

Percentage of Religions (2020 Census)
1. Presbyterian (27.2%)
2. Catholic (12.1%)
3. Anglican (12.0%)
4. Seventh-day Adventist (14.8%)
5. Other Christian (13.1%)
6. Customary beliefs (3.09%)
7. Other (12.0%)
8. Latter-day Saints (1.76%)
9. No religion (1.37%)
10. Refuse to answer (0.13%)
11. Other (2.37%)

Christianity is the majority faith in Vanuatu with Presbyterian Church of Vanuatu being the largest religious denomination in the country, though its share declined from 35.8% in 1989 to 27.2% in 2020. The Seventh-day Adventist Church(14.8 %) was the second-largest group followed by the Anglican and Catholic Churches, each accounting for just over 12% of the population. Other denominations includes the Church of Christ, Assemblies of God, Apostolic Church, Church of Latter-day Saints etc. Individuals without any religious affiliation accounted for 1.4%. The category "Other" encompassed 88 different religions, with membership ranging from one person to over 2,000.

Between 2009 and 2020, the Seventh-day Adventist Church and the Church of Christ experienced significant growth, while the Anglican Church's numbers remained relatively unchanged. Although small in proportion, the number of people without religious affiliation grew substantially during this period.

Religious composition varied greatly across provinces. In Penama and especially Torba, the Anglican Church was predominant, while the Presbyterian Church was the main religion in Malampa and Shefa. Catholicism was particularly strong in Penama and Malampa. Sanma had a significant Presbyterian population but also displayed the most diverse mix of religions. In Tafea, slightly more than one in six people identified Customary beliefs as their religious affiliation.

According to the 2020 World Religion Database, approximately 93 % of the population of Vanuatu is Christian. An estimated 32% is Presbyterian, 13% Roman Catholic, 13% Anglican, and 12% Seventh-day Adventist. Other groups together constitute 14% include the Church of Christ , the Apostolic Church, Assemblies of God, The Church of Jesus Christ of Latter-day Saints, Jehovah's Witnesses and some Protestant denominations.

The John Frum Movement is an indigenous religious group, is centered on the island of Tanna and includes about 5% of the population. Non Christian religions like Baháʼí Faith, Muslims also are active.

== History ==
=== The traditional religion of Vanuatu ===
Before Christianity, the indigenous religion of Vanuatu was inherited from Oceanian and Melanesian traditions. Missionaries often called this pre-Christian religion "pagan" or "heathen" in English, and as "times of darkness" in the country's local languages, or in Bislama (taem blong tudak).

The traditional religion, sometimes considered a form of animism, has been described by various authors, notably the Anglican missionary and anthropologist Robert Codrington in his famous 1891 monograph The Melanesians: Studies in Their Anthropology and Folk-lore (1891). He was followed by other scholars, including anthropologists and linguists.

Concepts central to the traditional religion include mana, tabu, and the worship of ancestral spirits (tamate). Named deities or mythological figures included Qat and Qasavara in the Banks Is, Tagaro on Ambae, Lisepsep across the archipelago.

Grade-taking ceremonies, which existed throughout Vanuatu, were associated with the indigenous religion, and with the transmission of mana.

Many aspects of the traditional religion have survived until today, in parallel with the adoption of Christianity, at least in some rural areas of Vanuatu.

=== Christianity ===
Christian missionization of Vanuatu began as early as 1606 upon the arrival of the Spanish explorer Pedro Fernandes de Queirós in Vanuatu. Missionaries representing several Western churches brought Christianity to the country in the 19th and early 20th centuries, specifically from Presbyterian, Catholic and Anglican missions. Some foreign missionaries continue this work; however, approximately 90% of the clergy of the established churches were indigenous by 2007. The Summer Institute of Linguistics have been active in translating the Bible into the country's many indigenous languages.

Because of the modernities that the military in World War II brought with them when they came to the islands, several cargo cults developed. Many died out, but the John Frum cult on Tanna is still large, and has adherents in the parliament. As well, Tanna is home to the Prince Philip Movement, which reveres the United Kingdom's Prince Philip. Villagers of the Yaohnanen tribe believed in an ancient story about the pale-skinned son of a mountain spirit venturing across the seas to look for a powerful woman to marry. Prince Philip, having visited the island with his new wife Queen Elizabeth, fit the description exactly and is therefore revered and even held as a god around the isle of Tanna.

=== The effects of colonial Christianity on Vanuatu culture ===
The effects of colonialism and Christianization have differed enormously throughout Vanuatu, partially due to the Anglo-French condominium governance as well as due to the uncoordinated Christian missionization efforts throughout the nation. The diverse approaches of the Catholic mission, the Melanesian Mission and the Church of Christ combined with varied cultural communities resulted in vastly different local attitudes regarding religion, tradition, and community restructuring. Often, Ni-Vanuatu converted to Christianity in the hopes of attaining the apparent wealth and prosperity the European Christians possessed. Through the spread of Christianity, missionaries aimed to restructure indigenous societies by desegregating gendered eating and sleeping customs, prohibiting exclusive men's houses, and reworking the idea of the domestic Ni-Vanuatu woman, in order to save women from what the missionaries saw as a "degraded state in kastom." In doing so, the missionaries inadvertently thrust Ni-Vanuatu women into the separate, but similarly gender-segregated Christian church, where men hold disproportionate power. While this new religious system upheld women in familial, motherly roles, it "stripped away those sacred aspects of human kinship which gave women a crucial if subordinated place in the ancestral religion."

=== The effects of Christianity on Vanuatu kastom ===
As Christianity gained followers, eventually becoming the prominent religion, support of local kastom decreased due to missionaries' habitual suppression of the incorporated local values, practices, and traditions. Kastom is an all-encompassing Bislama word that refers to traditional practices including culture, religion, art, economics, and magic in Vanuatu.

Vanuatu indigenous culture and kastom dramatically declined in the face of European colonization. The Europeans brought with them disease, weaponry and alcohol which lead to the death of indigenous peoples, as well as forcibly removed Ni-Vanuatu citizens, relocating them to Australia for forced labor. As well, European missionaries and Ni-Vanuatu Christian converts consciously oppressed certain kastom ways of life. While tolerance of kastom varied between churches, locations, and missions, the majority of Christians deemed the erasure of certain customs as a precondition to Christian conversion. Some of these practices included: "Polygyny, pig sacrifices, 'idolatry,' kava drinking, and men's secret societies," as missionaries believed such practices exemplified "heathenism" and "the powers of darkness."

=== The roles of Christianity, kastom and national identity on the 1970s Vanuatu independence movement ===
Kastom played a key role in mobilizing Vanuatu's independence movement in the 1970s, through establishing a national identity within a largescale resistance against Anglo-French colonialism. In 1971, Ni-Vanuatu Christian converts established the Vanuaaku Pati, originally named the New Hebrides National Party (NHNP), a political party which aimed to revive and maintain kastom as an essential part of Vanuatu nationalism. The Vanuaaku Pati highlighted the need for Vanuatu to break away from its colonizers, while simultaneously "emphasized the importance of kastom as a non-European 'grass-roots' force exemplifying the 'Melanesian way' as opposed to 'the white man's way.'

Prior to the 1979 national elections, the Vanuaaku Pati "published its electoral platform," affirming protection of kastom within the government. The document outlined a plan to create a National Council of Chiefs, ultimately ensuring the inclusion of kastom via leaders with power within custom law.

=== National symbols of kastom and Christianity ===
- The Vanuatu flag design, which features a boar's tusk symbolic of wealth and crossed palm leaves, a symbol of peace.
- The Vanuatu motto, "long God yumi stanap," translating to "before God we stand," appears alongside a warrior wearing traditional Vanuatu clothing, as well as a boar's tusk and crossed palm leaves.
- The Vanuatu national anthem, Yumi Yumi Yumi, both acknowledges God as well as the importance of kastom.
  - Regarding God, the anthem states "God i givim ples ia long yumi / God i helpem yumi evriwan" translating to "God has given us this land / God helps us in our work."
  - Regarding kastom, the anthem states "Plante fasin blong bifo i stap / Plante fasin blong tedei / Be yumi i olsem wan nomo / Hemia fasin blong yumi!" translating to "Many customs of before we have / Many customs from today / But we are all one / Despite our many ways!"
- Independence Week of July 1980, which included the presence of both Christian and kastom leaders, ceremonies, and celebrations, including church services, kastom dance, pig-killing, and traditional feasts.

== Symbols and rituals of kastom in daily life ==
- Nakamal - A men's meeting place
- Namele Leaves - Palm leaves from the Chief's Palm
- Pig Tusks
- Sand Drawing
- Naghol / Land Diving
- Kava Ceremonies

== Freedom of religion ==
The Constitution of Vanuatu establishes the freedom of religion, and also states that the state is founded on a commitment to "traditional Melanesian values, faith in God, and Christian principles."

Religious groups are allowed to establish private schools, and both private and public schools include optional religious education courses. Secondary schools must offer at least one hour a week of religious instruction, but parents can request an exemption for their children.

Religious groups are required to register with the government or face fines, but this law is not enforced in practice. Since 2016, high ranking members of the government have expressed the intent to define Vanuatu as a Christian country and to prohibit other religions from entering the country; as of the end of 2022, Vanuatu has no state religion.

The Baháʼí Faith arrived in Vanuatu in 1953. Local administrative councils, or Spiritual Assemblies, were formed as soon as individual Baháʼí communities were large enough. A regional administrative council for the south west pacific islands, including Vanuatu, was elected in 1964. Thirteen years later, in 1977, there were enough Baháʼís in Vanuatu for them to elected their own separate National Spiritual Assembly. The community continued to grow sufficiently that in 2012 the erection of a local Baháʼí House of Worship, or "Haos blong Wosip" in the local Bislama, was announced, serving as a space for people of all religions and backgrounds to gather, meditate, reflect, and worship. Ground was broken for the structure in 2019 and progress continues. At the groundbreaking ceremony, Vanuatu government officials and traditional leaders highlighted the importance of the local House of Worship on the island, stating that "This Temple will symbolize what we wish to see in Vanuatu in the years to come, which is peace and unity among us all, irrespective of belief" and describing that it "provides us a place where we can meditate deeply about our spiritual reality."

== See also ==
- Catholic Church in Vanuatu
- Buddhism in Oceania
- Islam in Vanuatu
