= Jean Bosco Baremes =

French priest

Jean Bosco Baremes SM
- Bishop of Port-Vila
- Church: Catholic Church
- Diocese: Diocese of Port-Vila
- Appointed: 18 November 2009
- Predecessor: Michel Visi

Orders
- Ordination: 4 December 1987
- Consecration: 14 February 2010 by Michel-Marie Calvet

Personal details
- Born: 30 August 1960 (age 65) Han Island, Carteret Islands, Territory of Papua and New Guinea, Australia

Jean Bosco Baremes, SM, (born August 30, 1960 in Han, Carteret Islands, Papua New Guinea) is a Papua New Guinean clergyman and bishop for the Roman Catholic Diocese of Port-Vila.

After his ordination in 1987, Baremes studied in the US and served in New Caledonia and Fiji.

He was appointed bishop in 2009.

== See also ==
- Catholic Church in Vanuatu
- Roman Catholic Diocese of Port-Vila
- Cathédrale du Sacré-Cœur, Port Vila
- History of Papua New Guinea
