= Cathédrale du Sacré-Cœur, Port Vila =

Cathedral in Port Vila, Vanuatu

Coordinates: 17°44′05″S 168°18′55″E

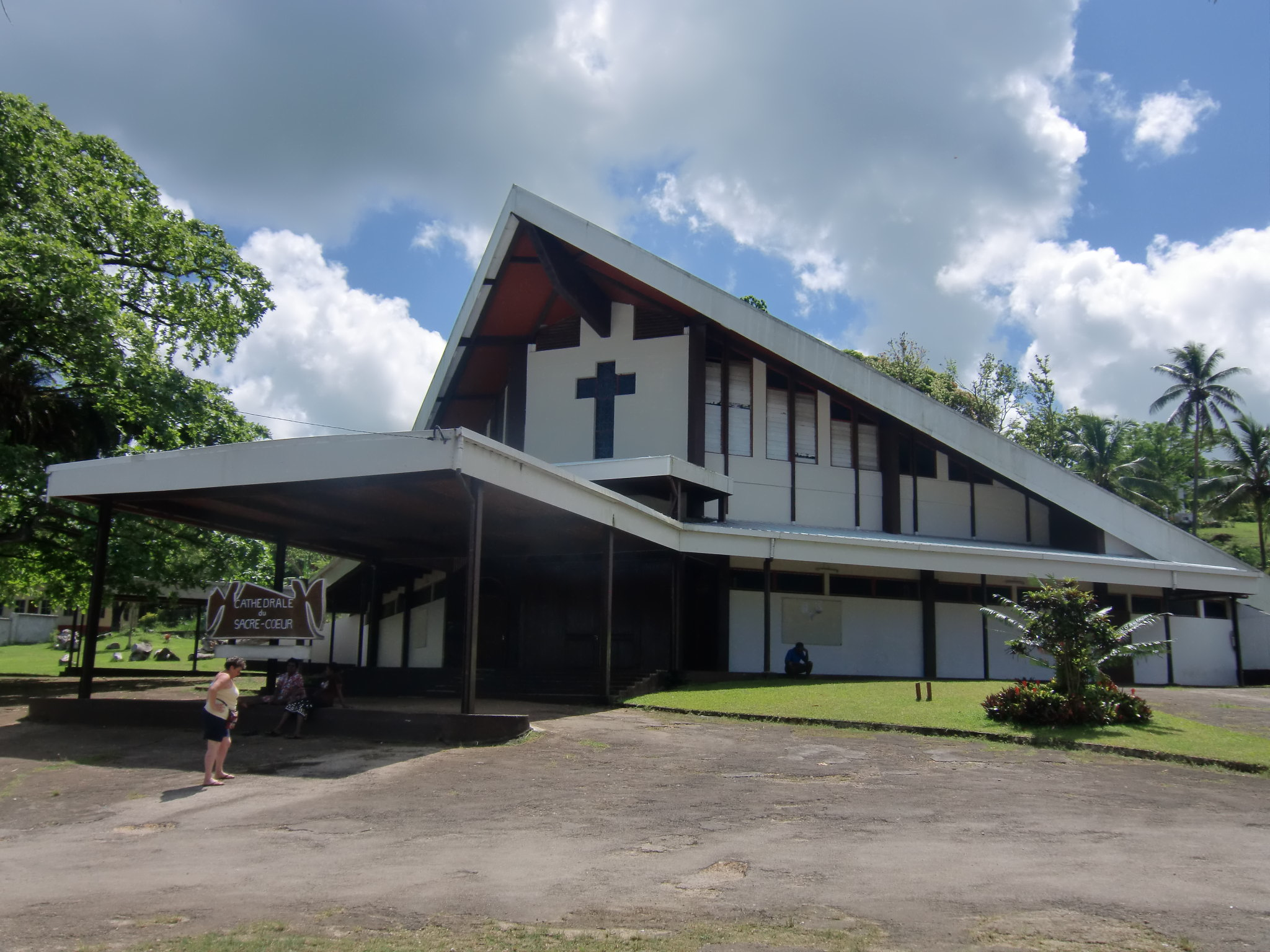
Cathédrale du Sacré-Cœur

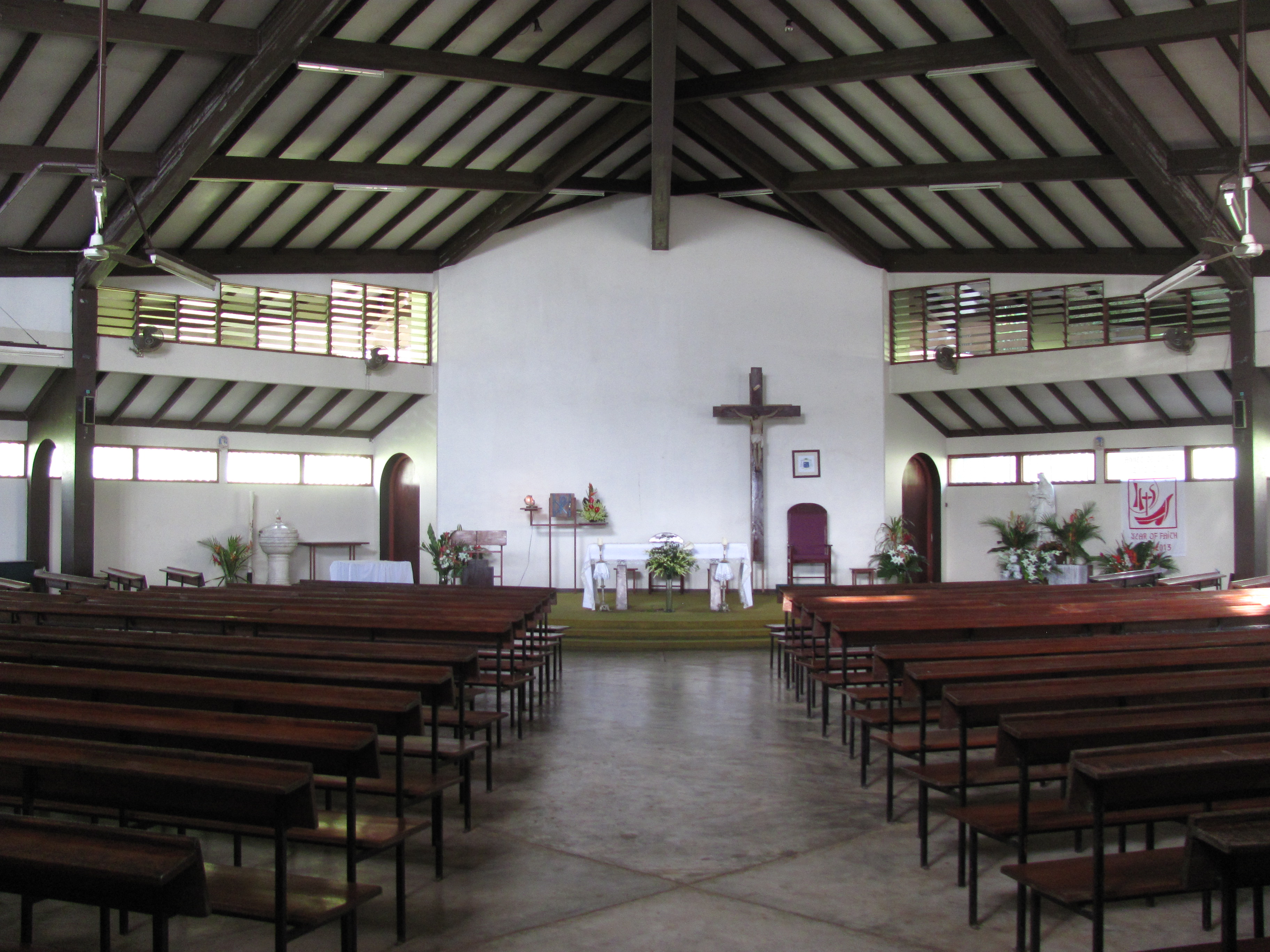
Interior of the Cathédrale du Sacré-Cœur

Cathédrale du Sacré-Cœur (French pronunciation: [katedʁal dy sakʁe kœʁ]; English: Cathedral of the Sacred Heart) is a modern Catholic cathedral in Port Vila, Vanuatu. It is the seat of the Diocese of Port-Vila. The church is dedicated to the sacred Heart of Jesus. Bishop Jean Bosco Baremes has served as Bishop of Port Vila since 2009.

Bishop Jean Bosco Baremes, a Marist from the Carteret Islands in Bougainville, was appointed Bishop of Port Vila by Pope Benedict XVI on 18 November 2009. He was ordained on 14 February 2010, succeeding Bishop Michel Visi, who died in 2007. During Cyclone Pam in March 2015, people reportedly sheltered in the cathedral, while its condition remained unknown. He was ordained at a ceremony in Parliament Park, attended by bishops from across the Pacific. Following Cyclone Pam, Vanuatu's president reported that 90% of buildings in Port Vila were damaged or destroyed.

== History ==
People were reported to have sheltered in the cathedral during Cyclone Pam in March 2015, though its condition was not known at the time. Vanuatu's president said the cyclone damaged or destroyed 90 percent of the buildings in Port Vila. Bishop Jean Bosco Baremes, a Marist, was appointed by Pope Benedict XVI on 18 November 2009.

He comes from the Carteret Islands in Bougainville and replaced Bishop Michel Visi, who died in 2007. He was ordained bishop on 14 February 2010 in a ceremony in Parliament Park, attended by bishops from across the Pacific. Bishop Jean Bosco Baremes has served as Bishop of Port Vila since 2009.

== See also ==
- Catholic Church in Vanuatu
