= Coubon =

- Commune
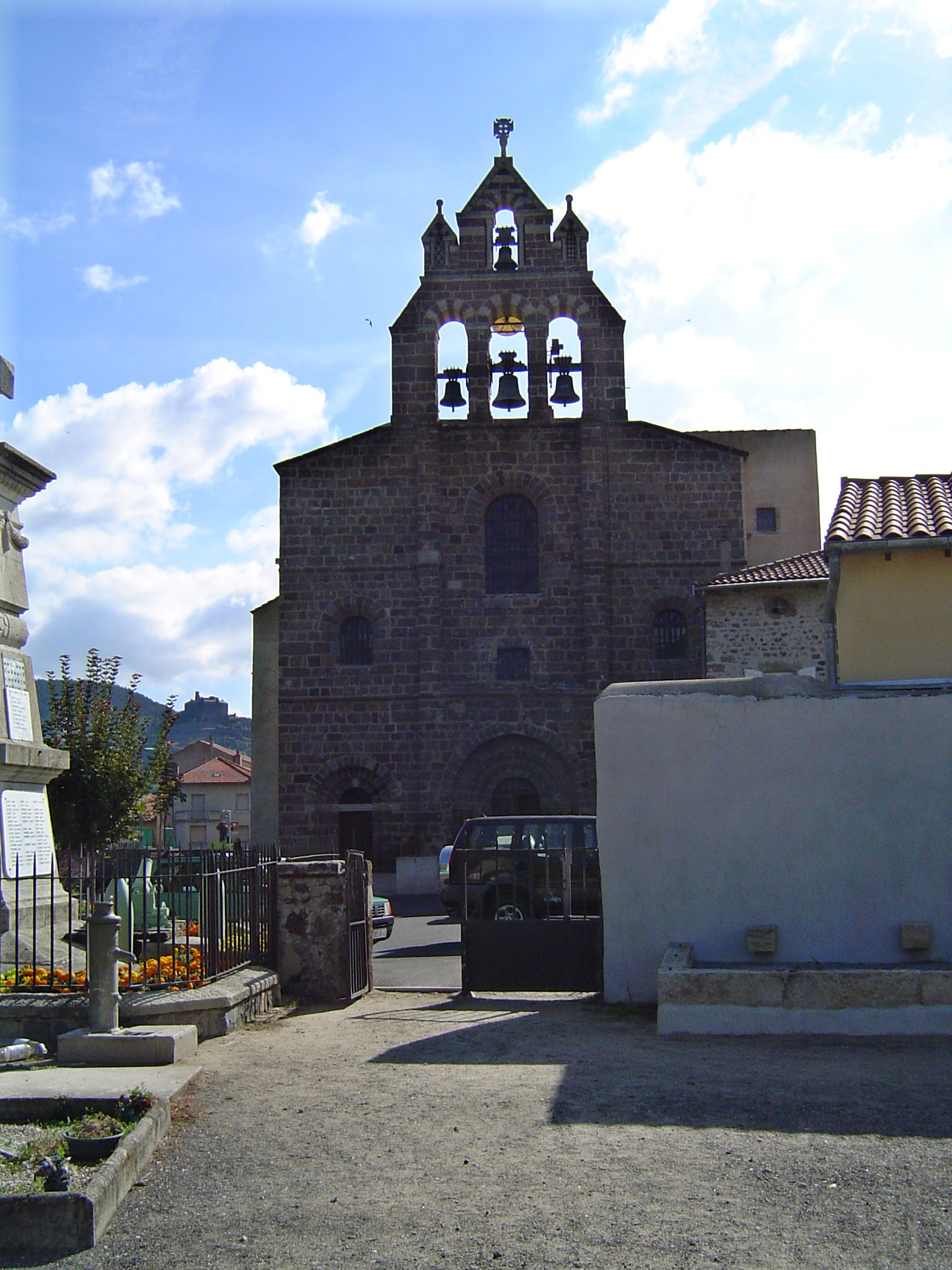

- Coat of arms
- Location of Coubon
- Location within France Location within Auvergne-Rhône-Alpes
- Coordinates: 44°59′52″N 3°55′07″E
- Country: France
- Region: Auvergne-Rhône-Alpes
- Department: Haute-Loire
- Arrondissement: Le Puy-en-Velay
- Canton: Le Puy-en-Velay-4
- Intercommunality: CA du Puy-en-Velay

Government
  - Mayor (2020–2026): Christelle Valantin
- Area^{1}: 22.73 km^{2} (8.78 sq mi)
- Elevation: 630 m (2,070 ft)
- Highest elevation: 948 m (3,110 ft)
- Lowest elevation: 607 m (1,991 ft)
- Population (2023): 3,140
  - Density: 138/km^{2} (358/sq mi)
- Time zone: UTC+01:00 (CET)
  - Summer (DST): UTC+02:00 (CEST)
- INSEE/Postal code: 43078 /43700
- ^{1} French Land Register data, which excludes lakes, ponds, glaciers > 1 km^{2} (0.386 sq mi or 247 acres) and river estuaries.

Coubon (French pronunciation: [kubɔ̃]; Occitan: Cobon) is a commune in the Haute-Loire department in south-central France.

== Population ==
In 1927 the new commune Arsac-en-Velay was created from part of its territory.

Historical population

Year	Pop.	±% p.a.
1793	2,254	—
1821	2,280	+0.04%
1846	2,400	+0.21%
1872	2,477	+0.12%
1901	2,452	−0.03%
1926	2,247	−0.35%
1946	1,075	−3.62%
1962	1,076	+0.01%
1968	1,115	+0.60%

Year	Pop.	±% p.a.
1975	1,486	+4.19%
1982	2,047	+4.68%
1990	2,562	+2.84%
1999	2,708	+0.62%
2007	3,048	+1.49%
2012	3,075	+0.18%
2017	3,243	+1.07%
2023	3,140	−0.54%

Source: EHESS and INSEE (1968-2023)

== See also ==
- Communes of the Haute-Loire department
