= Cantons of the Haute-Loire department =

The following is a list of the 19 cantons of the Haute-Loire department, in France, following the French canton reorganisation which came into effect in March 2015:

- Aurec-sur-Loire
- Bas-en-Basset
- Boutières
- Brioude
- Deux Rivières et Vallées
- Emblavez-et-Meygal
- Gorges de l'Allier-Gévaudan
- Mézenc
- Monistrol-sur-Loire
- Pays de Lafayette
- Plateau du Haut-Velay granitique
- Le Puy-en-Velay-1
- Le Puy-en-Velay-2
- Le Puy-en-Velay-3
- Le Puy-en-Velay-4
- Saint-Paulien
- Sainte-Florine
- Velay volcanique
- Yssingeaux
