= Diocese of Port-Vila =

Catholic diocese in Vanuatu

Coordinates: 17°44′05″S 168°19′19″E

Diocese of Port-Vila Dioecesis Portus Vilensis Diocèse de Port-Vila
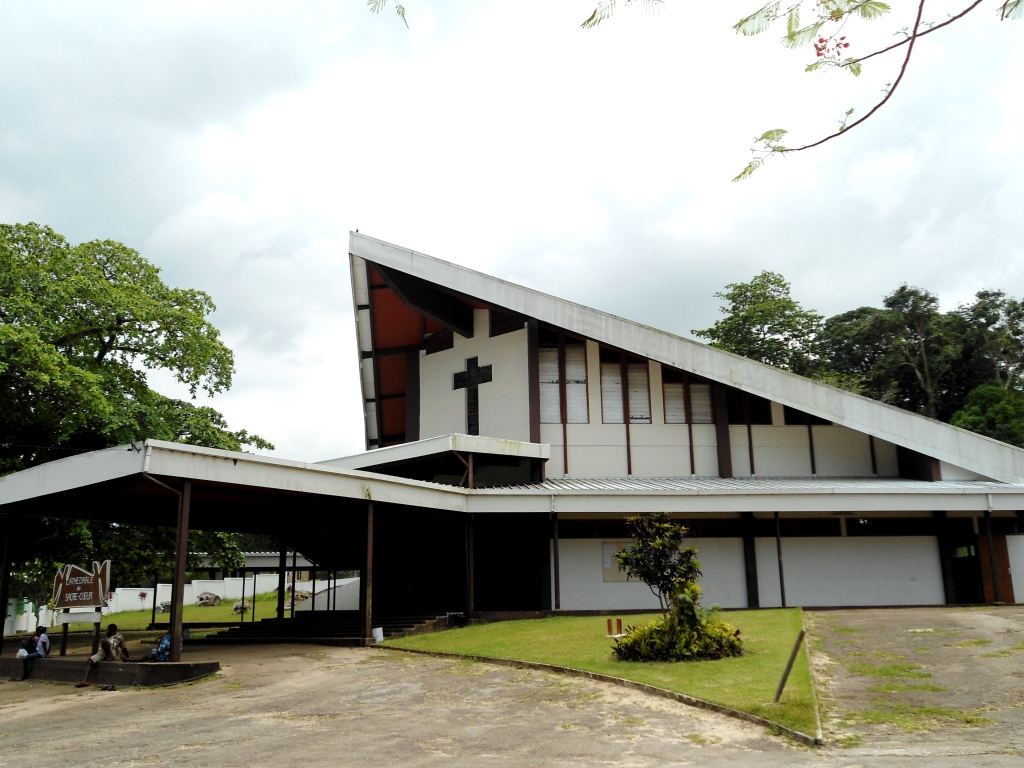
- Cathédrale du Sacré-Cœur, Port Vila

Location
- Country: Vanuatu
- Ecclesiastical province: Nouméa
- Metropolitan: Archdiocese of Nouméa

Statistics
- Area: 11,870 km^{2} (4,580 sq mi)
- Population: Total; Catholics: (as of 2004); 205,000; 29,500 (14,4%)

Information
- Denomination: Catholic
- Sui iuris church: Latin Church
- Rite: Roman Rite
- Established: 9 February 1901 (As Prefecture Apostolic of New Hebrides); 22 March 1904 (As Vicariate Apostolic of New Hebrides); 21 June 1966 (As Diocese of Port-Vila)
- Cathedral: Cathedral of the Sacred Heart in Port-Vila

Current leadership
- Pope: Leo XIV
- Bishop: Jean Bosco Baremes
- Metropolitan Archbishop: Susitino Sionepoe

The Diocese of Port-Vila (Latin: Dioecesis Portus Vilensis; French: Diocèse de Port-Vila) in Vanuatu is a suffragan diocese of the Archdiocese of Nouméa. The diocese covers the whole island of Vanuatu.

== History ==
The first Catholic mission in Vanuatu was started in 1887 at Mele on Efate, by the Marist Father Le Forestier, three other Marist priests and a brother. The greatest growth of Catholic converts took place in the north, where the French influence was strong. This was especially true in Espiritu Santo and Malekula.

In 1901 it was first erected as the Prefecture Apostolic of New Hebrides (Insularum Novarum Ebridarum), with Victor Douceré as apostolic prefect. On 22 March 1904 it became a Vicariate Apostolic. In 1966, it was elevated as the Diocese of Port-Vila by Pope Paul VI.

The diocese is managed by Bishop John Bosco Baremes, and falls under the Archdiocese of Nouméa, which is led by Archbishop Susitino Sionepoe.

Tropical Cyclone Pam, of March 2015, was the second most intense tropical cyclone of the south Pacific Ocean in terms of sustained winds and is regarded as one of the worst natural disasters in the history of Vanuatu. Bishop John Bosco Baremes worked with the Diocesan Disaster Committee and Caritas to identify and address key needs such as shelter, food, clean water, leading the response to the cyclone and ensuring the protection of the poor and vulnerable.

== Ordinaries ==
- Isidore-Marie-Victor Douceré (1901–1939)
- Jules Halbert (1939–1954)
- Louis-Jean-Baptiste-Joseph Julliard (1955–1976)
- Francis-Roland Lambert (1976–1996)
- Michel Visi (1996 – May 19, 2007)
- Jean Bosco Baremes (November 18, 2009 – present)

== See also ==
- Catholic Church in Vanuatu

== External links and references ==
- Pacific News: Vanuatu Bishop Michel Visi Dies Aged 52
- "Diocese of Port-Vila". Catholic-Hierarchy.
