= Michel-Maurice-Augustin-Marie Darmancier =

French Catholic bishop (1918–1984)

Michel-Maurice-Augustin-Marie Darmancier S.M.
- Bishop of Wallis et Futuna
- Church: Catholic Church
- Diocese: Diocese of Wallis et Futuna
- In office: 21 June 1966 – 25 April 1974
- Predecessor: Alexandre Poncet
- Successor: Laurent Fuahea
- Previous posts: Titular Bishop of Augurus (1961-1966); Vicar Apostolic of Wallis et Futuna (1961-1966)

Orders
- Ordination: 10 February 1946
- Consecration: 26 April 1962 by Pierre-Paul-Émile Martin

Personal details
- Born: 25 August 1918 Izieu, France
- Died: 1 October 1984 (aged 66) Paris, France

Michel-Maurice-Augustin-Marie Darmancier (born in 1918 in Izieux) was a French clergyman and bishop for the Roman Catholic Diocese of Wallis et Futuna. He was appointed bishop in 1961. He died in 1984.
