= Laurent Fuahea =

- Bishop of Wallis et Futuna
- Native name: Lolesio Fuahea
- Church: Catholic Church
- Diocese: Diocese of Wallis et Futuna
- In office: 25 April 1975 – 20 June 2005
- Predecessor: Michel-Maurice-Augustin-Marie Darmancier
- Successor: Ghislain de Rasilly
- Previous posts: Titular Bishop of Bagai (1972-1974); Auxiliary Bishop of Wallis et Futuna (1972-1974)

Orders
- Ordination: 21 December 1957
- Consecration: 16 July 1972 by Michel-Maurice-Augustin-Marie Darmancier

Personal details
- Born: 5 September 1927 Hihifo, Wallis, Protectorate of Wallis and Futuna, France
- Died: 2 December 2011 (aged 84)

Laurent Lolesio Fuahea (5 September 1927 – 2 December 2011) was a Wallisian Catholic prelate who served as Bishop of Wallis et Futuna from 1974 until 2005. He was born in Hihifo, Wallis and became a bishop on 16 July 1972. He was ordained a priest in 1957 and succeeded Michel-Maurice-Augustin-Marie Darmancier as Bishop of Wallis and Futuna on 25 April 1974.
