= Ghislain de Rasilly =

French Roman Catholic prelate and bishop (born 1943)

The Most Reverend Ghislain Marie Raoul Suzanne de Rasilly, S.M.
- Bishop of Wallis et Futuna
- Coat of Arms of Bishop de Rasilly
- Diocese: Wallis et Futuna
- Appointed: June 20, 2005
- Term ended: December 24, 2018
- Predecessor: Laurent Fuahea
- Successor: Susitino Sionepoe

Orders
- Ordination: November 6, 1971 (priesthood)
- Consecration: August 7, 2005 (episcopate) by Charles Daniel Balvo

Personal details
- Born: July 9, 1943 (age 82) Juvardeil, France
- Denomination: Roman Catholic
- Motto: Avec Marie (with Mary)

Ghislain Marie Raoul Suzanne de Rasilly (born July 9, 1943 Juvardeil, France) is a Catholic prelate and the Bishop Emeritus of Wallis et Futuna since 24 December 2018.

In 2018, he gave in his resignation on Christmas Eve (24 December). Pope Francis then announced that Susitino Sionepoe, former Provincial Vicar of the Society of Mary (Marists) was to succeed him as Bishop of Wallis and Futuna.
