= Jules Halbert =

French clergyman and Roman Catholic bishop

Jules Halbert SM
- Vicar Apostolic of New Hebrides
- Church: Catholic Church
- See: Vicariate Apostolic of New Hebrides
- In office: 11 July 1939 – December 1954
- Predecessor: Isidore-Marie-Victor Douceré
- Successor: Louis-Jean-Baptiste-Joseph Julliard
- Previous post: Titular Bishop of Archelaïs (1939-1955)

Orders
- Ordination: 29 June 1911
- Consecration: 10 December 1939 by Édouard Bresson

Personal details
- Born: 7 February 1886 Le Landreau, Loire-Inférieure, France
- Died: 4 February 1955 (aged 68) Nouméa, New Caledonia, Overseas Territory of France

Jules Halbert (1886 in Landreau – 1955) was a French clergyman and bishop for the Roman Catholic Diocese of Port-Vila. He was appointed bishop in 1939.
