= Michel Visi =

- Bishop of Port-Vila
- Church: Catholic Church
- Diocese: Diocese of Port-Vila
- In office: 30 November 1996 – 19 May 2007
- Predecessor: Francis-Roland Lambert
- Successor: Jean Bosco Baremes

Orders
- Ordination: 15 December 1982
- Consecration: 12 April 1997 by Francis-Roland Lambert

Personal details
- Born: 24 October 1954 Ambae, New Hebrides, British & French Empires
- Died: 19 May 2007 (aged 52) Port Vila, Vanuatu

Michel Visi (24 October 1954 in Nangire, Ambae, Vanuatu – 19 May 2007 in Port Vila, Vanuatu) was the bishop of the Roman Catholic Diocese of Port-Vila. He also served as the head of Vanuatu's Vanuatu Christian Council, an important interdenominational organization.

Visi was originally from the island of Ambae in the northern part of Vanuatu. He was ordained as a Catholic priest on 15 December 1982 at the age of 28. He was appointed to be the Bishop of Vanuatu on 12 April 1997 by Pope John Paul II to succeed bishop Francis Lambert. He was the first indigenous Vanuatuan to be appointed to this post.

Visi was found dead in his bedroom in Port Vila on 19 May 2007. His funeral was held on 22 May at the Port Vila Roman Catholic Cathedral. His funeral was officiated by the Nouméa Archbishop Michel-Marie-Bernard Calvet.
