= Francis-Roland Lambert =

Francis-Roland Lambert SM
- Bishop of Port-Vila
- Church: Catholic Church
- Diocese: Diocese of Port-Vila
- In office: 31 December 1976 – 12 December 1996
- Predecessor: Louis-Jean-Baptiste-Joseph Julliard
- Successor: Michel Visi

Orders
- Ordination: 15 September 1939 by Richard Cushing
- Consecration: 20 March 1977 by Louis-Jean-Baptiste-Joseph Julliard

Personal details
- Born: February 7, 1921 Lawrence, Massachusetts, United States
- Died: October 29, 1997 (aged 76)

Francis-Roland Lambert (1921–1997) was an American clergyman and bishop for the Roman Catholic Diocese of Port-Vila. Born in Lawrence, Massachusetts, he was appointed bishop in 1976.
