= Catholic Church in Wallis and Futuna =

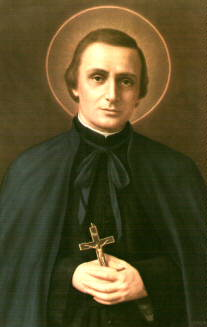
St Peter Chanel led the first missionaries to the islands in 1837.

The Catholic Church in Wallis and Futuna is part of the worldwide Catholic Church under the spiritual leadership of the pope. The French were the first Europeans to settle in the territory, and with the arrival of missionaries in 1837 converted the population to Catholicism. Today, the population of the Pacific island French territory is overwhelmingly Catholic. Bishop Susitino Sionepoe has led the Diocese of Wallis et Futuna since 2025.

== Demographics ==
The CIA World Factbook lists Wallis and Futuna as 99% Catholic.

== History ==
Prior to the arrival of Europeans, the people of the islands practiced a Polytheistic Polynesian religion. Although the Dutch and the British were the first European explorers to see the islands in the 17th and 18th centuries, it was the French who were the first Europeans to settle in the territory, with the arrival of missionaries in 1837, who converted the population to Catholicism.

Responsibility for Oceania was given by the Catholic Church to the Society of the Sacred Hearts of Jesus and Mary in 1825; but the territory was judged to be too large, and the western portion was formed into a vicariate Apostolic and given to the Society of Mary in 1836, with Mgr Jean Baptiste Pompallier (1807–1871) appointed vicar Apostolic of Western Oceania. In 1842, the vicariate Apostolic of Central Oceania was created comprising New Caledonia, Tonga, Samoa, and Fiji. A later subdivision, reduced the vicariate to include only Tonga, the Wallis Islands, Futuna, and Niué.

St Peter Chanel, was made the superior of a band of Marist missionaries that set out on 24 December 1836 from France. They were accompanied by Bishop Jean Baptiste Pompallier who was to become the first Bishop of New Zealand. Pompallier based himself in New Zealand.

Chanel went to Futuna Island, accompanied by a French laybrother Marie-Nizier Delorme, arriving in 1837. They were initially well received by the island's king, Niuliki. Once the missionaries learned the local language and began preaching directly to the people, the king grew restive. He believed that Christianity would take away his prerogatives as high priest and king. When the king's son, Meitala, sought to be baptized, the king sent a favoured warrior, his son-in-law, Musumusu, to "do whatever was necessary" to resolve the problem. Musumusu initially went to Meitala and the two fought. Musumusu, injured in the fracas, went to Chanel feigning need of medical attention. While Chanel tended him a group of others ransacked his house. Musumusu took an axe and clubbed Chanel on the head. Pierre died that day, April 28, 1841.

After Chanel's martyrdom, missionary work was continued. Pompallier sent Frs Catherin Servant, François Roulleaux-Dubignon and Br Marie Nizier to return to the Island. They arrived on 9 June 1842. Eventually most on the island converted to Catholicism. Musumusu himself converted and as he lay dying expressed the desire that he be buried outside the church at Poi so that those who came to revere Peter Chanel in the Church would walk over his grave to get to it.

As a kind of penitence a special action song and dance, known as the eke, was created by the people of Futuna shortly after Chanel's death. The dance is still performed in Tonga.

On 5 April 1842, the missionaries asked for the protection of France after the rebellion of a part of the local population. On 5 April 1887, the queen of Uvea (on the island of Wallis) signed a treaty officially establishing a French protectorate.

The Vicariate Apostolic of Wallis et Futuna was established in 1935 and it was elevated in 1966 to become the Diocese of Wallis et Futuna.

Today the islands remain an external territory of France, with a local customary administration co-existing with the French and territorial political institutions. The Catholic Church remains very influential in Wallis and Futuna, including in education.

== Bibliography ==
- Delbos, Paul. The Catholic Church in Wallis and Futuna (1837-2004) (PDF). Suva: CEPAC. ISBN 982-506-003-4.

== See also ==
- List of Saints from Oceania
