= Arsac-en-Velay =

- Commune
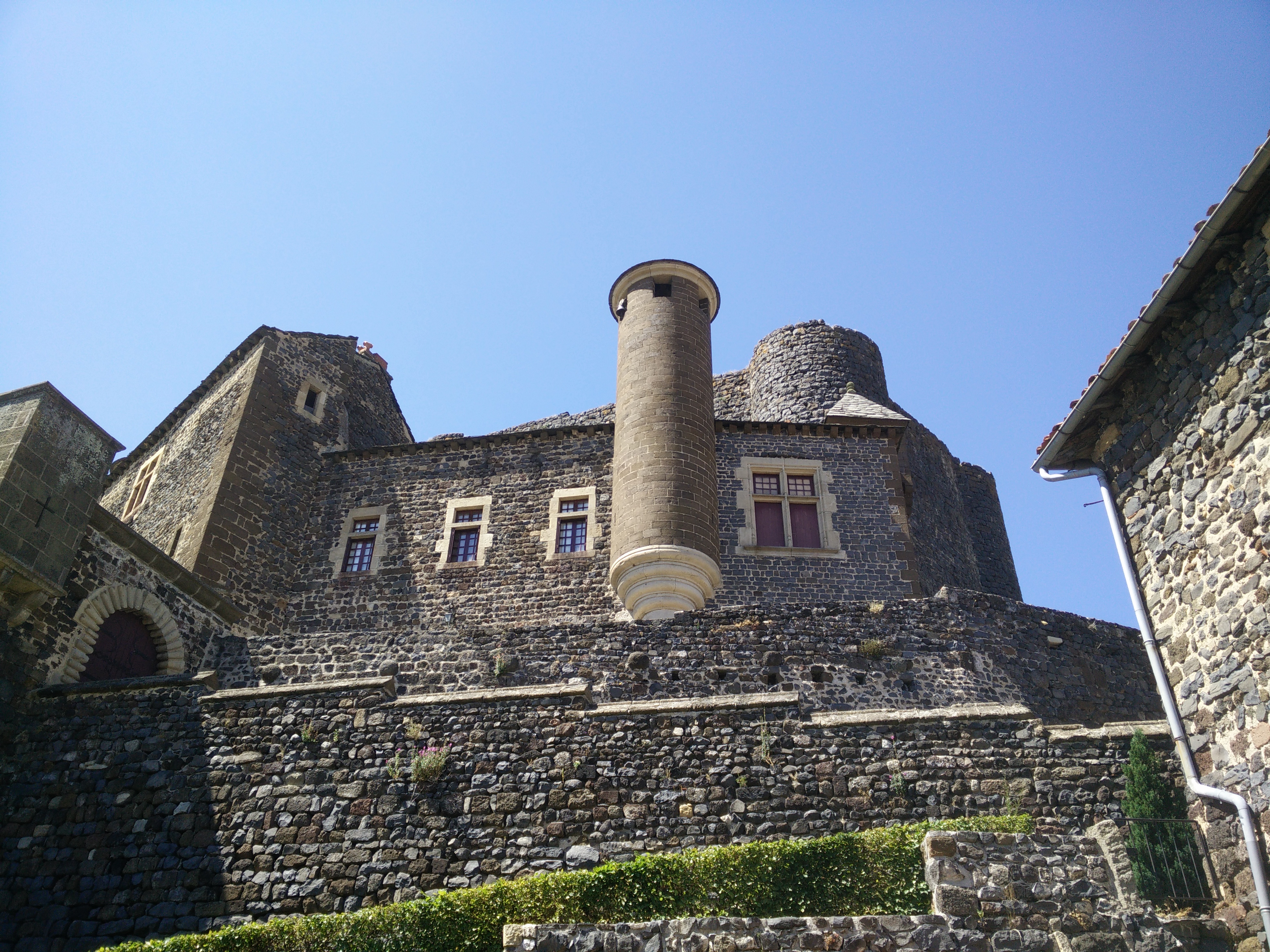
- Château de Bouzol
- Location of Arsac-en-Velay
- Location within France Location within Auvergne-Rhône-Alpes
- Coordinates: 44°59′29″N 3°56′38″E
- Country: France
- Region: Auvergne-Rhône-Alpes
- Department: Haute-Loire
- Arrondissement: Le Puy-en-Velay
- Canton: Le Puy-en-Velay-4
- Intercommunality: CA du Puy-en-Velay

Government
  - Mayor (2020–2026): Thierry Mourgues
- Area^{1}: 12.15 km^{2} (4.69 sq mi)
- Elevation: 750 m (2,460 ft)
- Highest elevation: 958 m (3,143 ft)
- Lowest elevation: 620 m (2,030 ft)
- Population (2023): 1,219
  - Density: 100.3/km^{2} (259.9/sq mi)
- Time zone: UTC+01:00 (CET)
  - Summer (DST): UTC+02:00 (CEST)
- INSEE/Postal code: 43010 /43700
- ^{1} French Land Register data, which excludes lakes, ponds, glaciers > 1 km^{2} (0.386 sq mi or 247 acres) and river estuaries.

Arsac-en-Velay (French pronunciation: [aʁsak ɑ̃ vəlɛ], literally Arsac in Velay; Occitan: Arsac de Velai) is a commune in the Haute-Loire department in south-central France.

== Population ==
Historical population
Year	Pop.	±% p.a.
1968	526	—
1975	555	+0.77%
1982	757	+4.53%
1990	870	+1.75%
1999	915	+0.56%
2007	1,078	+2.07%
2012	1,225	+2.59%
2017	1,208	−0.28%
2023	1,219	+0.15%
Source: INSEE

== See also ==
- Communes of the Haute-Loire department
