= Isidore-Marie-Victor Douceré =

Isidore-Marie-Victor Douceré SM
- Vicar Apostolic of New Hebrides
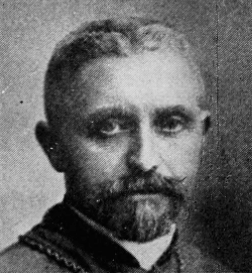
- Church: Catholic Church
- See: Vicariate Apostolic of New Hebrides
- Predecessor: Prefecture erected
- Successor: Jules Halbert
- Previous post: Titular Bishop of Terenuthis (1904-1939)

Orders
- Ordination: c. 1881
- Consecration: 10 July 1904 by Hilarion Fraysse

Personal details
- Born: 3 April 1857 Évran, Côtes-du-Nord, French Empire
- Died: 12 May 1939 (aged 82)

Isidore-Marie-Victor Douceré (born 1857 in Evran) was a French clergyman and bishop for the Roman Catholic Diocese of Port-Vila. He was appointed bishop in 1901. He died in 1939.
