= Arrondissements of the Haute-Loire department =

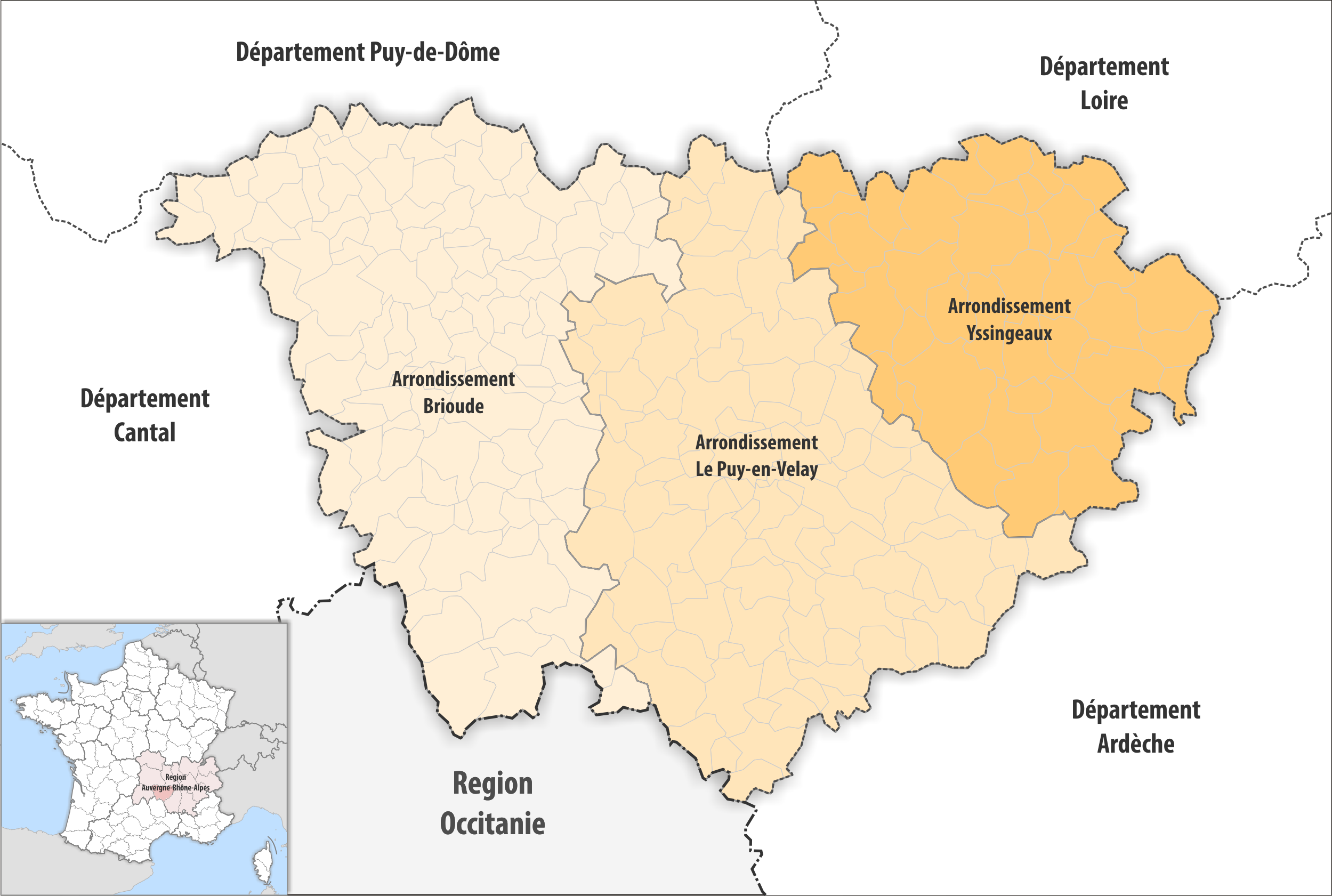
Map of arrondissements of the Haute-Loire department.

The 3 arrondissements of the Haute-Loire department are:

1. Arrondissement of Brioude, (subprefecture: Brioude) with 111 communes. The population of the arrondissement was 44,829 in 2021.
2. Arrondissement of Le Puy-en-Velay, (prefecture of the Haute-Loire department: Le Puy-en-Velay) with 102 communes. The population of the arrondissement was 96,495 in 2021.
3. Arrondissement of Yssingeaux, (subprefecture: Yssingeaux) with 44 communes. The population of the arrondissement was 85,960 in 2021.

== History ==
In 1800, the arrondissements of Le Puy, Brioude, and Yssingeaux were established. The arrondissement of Yssingeaux was disbanded in 1926 and restored in 1942. In January 2007, the arrondissement of Brioude absorbed the canton of Saugues from the arrondissement of Le Puy-en-Velay.
