= Catholic Church in Vanuatu =

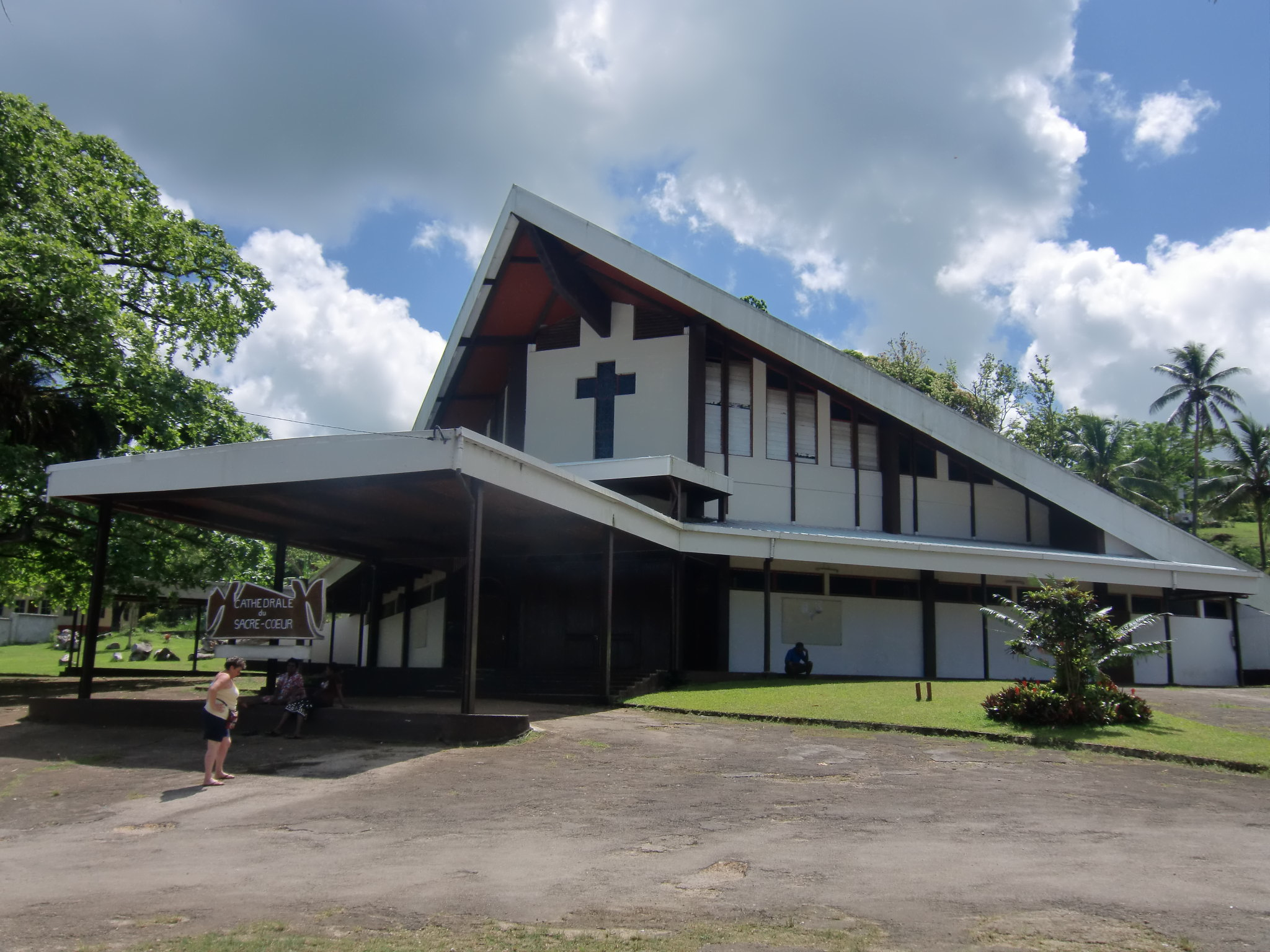
Cathedral of the Sacred Heart in Port Vila

The Catholic Church in Vanuatu is part of the worldwide Catholic Church, under the spiritual leadership of the Pope in Rome. Catholics constitute 13% of the population of Vanuatu in 2022. The church is organized into one diocese based in the capital of Port Vila.

The diocese is a member of the Pacific Bishops Conference.

== History ==
The first ever mass in Oceania was performed on May 14, 1606, when Spanish explorer Pedro de Quiros landed on Espiritu Santo with four priests and eight brothers, some of which were Franciscans and St John of God, and celebrated Pentecost.

In 1875 mostly Catholic Tannese settlers wrote to the French government asking that the islands be claimed by France. A permanent mission of the Marist Fathers was established with considerable difficulty in 1887. The mission in Port Vila developed rapidly in the next twenty years.

The islands' first native named bishop, Michel Visi, was named at April 12, 1997 and served till his death in 2007. An ambassador to the Holy See, Michel Rittie was chosen for the first time in 2003.

Bishop Jean Bosco Baremes has served as Bishop of Port Vila since 2009.

Vanuatu sent a delegation of young people for the first time to World Youth Day 2008 when it was held in Sydney, Australia.

== See also ==
- Roman Catholic Diocese of Port-Vila
