= Nouméa Cathedral =

Roman Catholic church in Nouméa, New Caledonia

Coordinates: 22°16′22″S 166°26′40″E

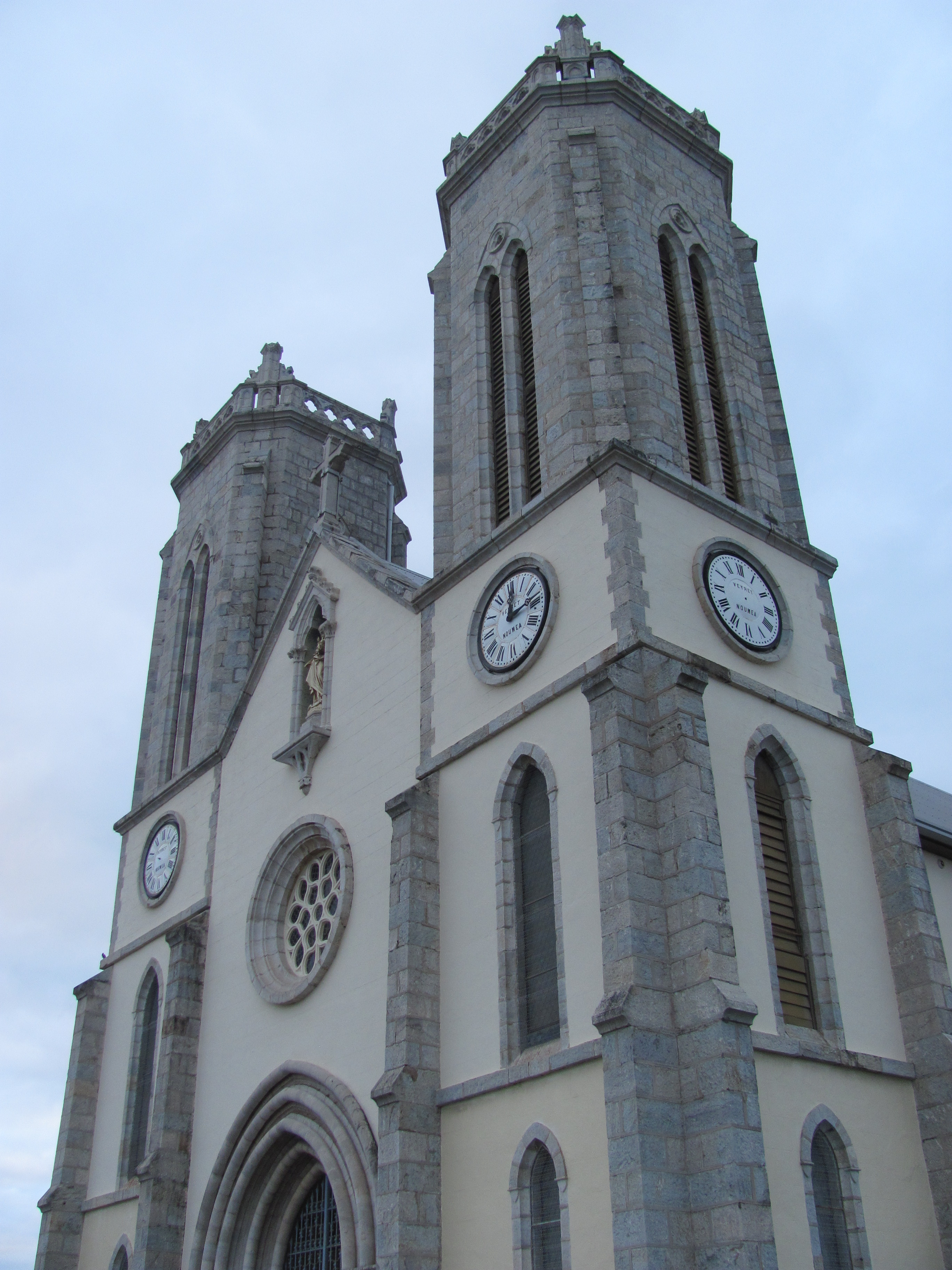
Nouméa Cathedral

Nouméa Cathedral (French: Cathédrale Saint-Joseph de Nouméa) is a Catholic church in Nouméa, New Caledonia. It is dedicated to the Saint Joseph. The cathedral has been the seat since 1966 of the Archdiocese of Nouméa, to which the former Vicariate Apostolic of Nouvelle-Calédonie was elevated.

== History ==
The cathedral, dedicated to Saint Joseph, the husband of the Virgin Mary, was built between 1887 and 1897 as the seat of the Vicar Apostolic of Nouvelle-Calédonie (created in 1847) with convict labour to plans by a former prisoner, a certain Labulle. It was blessed on 26 October 1890 by Père Xavier Montrouzier, almoner of the hospital, opened on the following All Saints Day, and consecrated in 1893 by the Vicar Apostolic of Fiji, Monseigneur Julien Vidal, before the façade and the bell towers were completely finished.

== Structure ==
The cathedral has a Latin cross ground plan, and is 56 m (184 ft) long (five bays with sexpartite ogival vaults for the nave, two straight bays and five polygonal bays for the choir), with a transept 36 m (118 ft) wide, on a south-west–north-east axis. 15.5 m (51 ft) high, the building is flanked on its south-west façade to either side of the porch by two towers 25 m (82 ft) high with stone balustrades at the top. (Originally it was intended to add spires to the tops of the towers, but the idea was abandoned given the prevalence of cyclones). The two towers, the buttresses and the surrounds of the doors and windows are in dressed stone (typical of the buildings constructed by the convicts), while the other walls are of rubble masonry mortared with lime. The woodwork and the ogival vaults are in red kauri wood. The roof is made of corrugated metal.

== Windows ==
The building contains 28 stained glass windows depicting various saints and Biblical figures:

- Nave:

- North wall: Saint Cecilia, Saint Maurice, Saint Elizabeth, Saint Augustine, Moses
- South wall: Saint Stanislaus the Martyr, Saint Helena, Saint Vincent de Paul, Saint Monica, Saint Francis Xavier

- Transept :

- North arm (Chapel of the Sacred Heart) :
  - west wall : Saint Thérèse of Lisieux, Saint Louis
  - north wall : Sacred Heart
  - east wall : Saint Mary Magdalene, Saint Patrick
- South arm (Lady Chapel) :
  - west wall : Saint Rose of Lima, Saint Anne
  - south wall : Rosary, or the Virgin with Roses
  - east wall : Saint Joachim, Saint Pierre Chanel

- Choir :

- north wall : Saint Alphonsus Liguori, Saint Michael
- south wall : Saint Austremonius, Saint Leo I

- Apse :

- north wall : Saint John the Apostle, Saint Peter
- south wall : Saint Andrew, Saint Paul

There is also a statue of Joan of Arc in armour and bearing a standard on the terrace outside to the south. This was a gift from the Bishop of Orléans in 1901.

== Site and contents ==
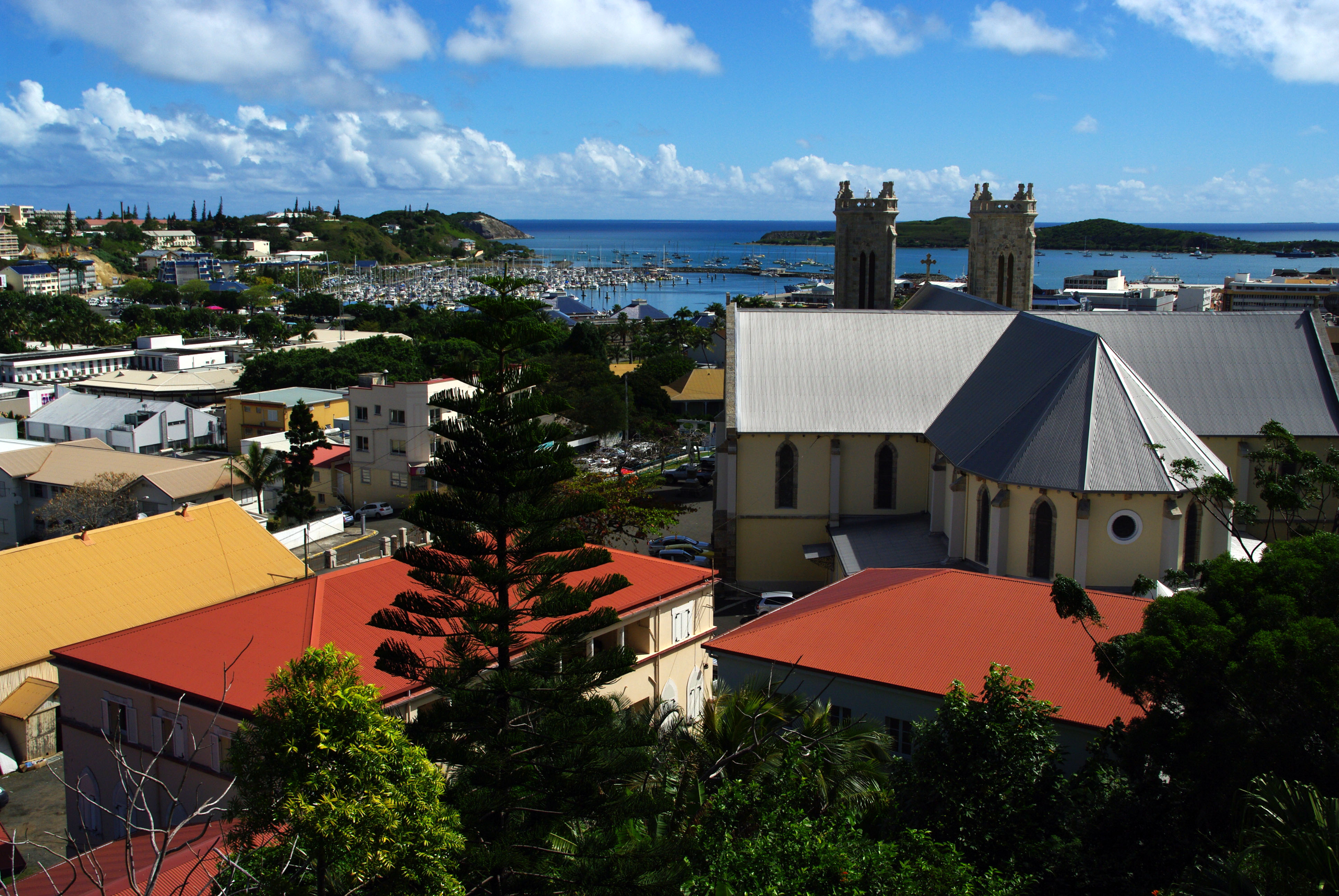
The cathedral overlooking the town

The cathedral is situated on an elevation dominating the town centre of Nouméa and is built on artificial terraces constructed between 1876 and 1887. It was classed as a monument historique on 20 August 1992, partly because of its outlook, partly because in its architecture it resembles several cathedrals of Latin America, and partly because of the quality of many of its furnishings. These include its high altar, sculpted in 1860, and inherited from the Mission de Saint-Louis, the first mother-church of the vicariate apostolic until the consecration of the cathedral in 1893. Other important furnishings are the carvings in tamanu wood; the choir; the bishop's throne; the chapels, in which the giant holy water stoups are made from the shells of giant clams (Tridacna gigas); the chandelier, a replica of that of the Church of the Madeleine in Paris and made from one of the first pieces of nickel mined in New Caledonia; the carved lectern; and the organ loft.

== Sources and external links ==
- Archdiocese of Nouméa website: page of the cathedral parish (in French)
- Saint Joseph's Cathedral (1897) at Structurae. Retrieved 2011-06-04.
- New Caledonia Province Sud website: cathedral page (in French)
- Nouméa municipal website: cathedral (in French)
