= Susitino Sionepoe =

Roman Catholic bishop (born 1965)

His Excellency, The Most Reverend, Monsignor. Susitino Sionepoe S.M.
- Metropolitan Archbishop of Nouméa
- Province: Archdiocese of Nouméa
- Appointed: January 2025
- Predecessor: Ghislain Marie Raoul Suzanne de Rasilly
- Other post: Bishop of Wallis et Futuna (2019-2025)

Orders
- Ordination: 28 November 1993 (priesthood)
- Consecration: 24 March 2019 (episcopate) by Michel-Marie-Bernard Calvet

Personal details
- Born: 4 January 1965 (age 61) Vaitupu, Hihifo District. Wallis and Futuna
- Denomination: Roman Catholic

His Excellency, The Most Reverend, Monsignor. Susitino Sionepoe, S.M. (born January 4, 1965) is a Wallisian Catholic prelate who is Metropolitan Archbishop of Nouméa since 2025. He previously served as Bishop of Wallis et Futuna from 2018 to 2025. He is a member of the Marists.

== Personal life ==
Susitino was born in Vaitupu, the capital of the Hihifo District in Wallis (Also known as 'Uvea). Between 1982 and 1984, he was in the Foyer Vocationnel of the Society of Mary (Marists) in Finetomai, 'Uvea. He completed Secondary education at Paita, New Caledonia and served in the French Navy in Nouméa for two years before returning to continue his seminary education. He completed his Second Novitiate in 1992 after a brief year doing Pastoral work in New Caledonia. He completed the novitiate in the Roman Catholic Archdiocese of Sydney. He was then ordained to the Priesthood in 1993 by Bishop Laurent Fuahea, then the Bishop of Wallis and Futuna.

== Life after priesthood ==
Sionepoe has worked in four different Dioceses since his ordination. He was Parish Vicar of both Nuku'alofa and Houma in the Roman Catholic Diocese of Tonga under then newly consecrated Bishop Soane Lilo Foliaki. After two years in Tonga, he returned to New Caledonia where he worked in the Archdiocese of Nouméa until 2012.

Sionepoe was elected as Oceania Provincial Vicar of the Marists in 2012, and resided in Suva, Fiji. He was concurrently made Religious Superior of the Marists in Wallis and Futuna. He held both positions until his appointment as Bishop in 2018. When appointed as Bishop, he was working in pastoral ministry alongside the Marist Fathers in Yale, New Caledonia.

== Appointment as bishop ==
After the resignation of Bishop Ghislain Marie Raoul Suzanne de Rasilly on December 24, 2018, Sionepoe was appointed by Pope Francis on the same day. Attended by people on both islands, his consecration as Bishop was held on March 24, 2019, and presided by Archbishop Michel-Marie-Bernard Calvet, Archbishop of Nouméa. Assistant Bishops included his predecessor, Ghislain Marie Raoul Suzanne de Rasilly and the Bishop of Port-Vila, Jean-Bosco Baremes. The letter announcing his appointment was read out by Monsignor Edward Karaan, Charges d'Affaires of the Apostolic Nunciature of New Zealand and the Pacific Islands. His consecration was attended by Bishops and Priests of the Diocese, as well as a delegation of 200 people from New Caledonia, including the President, Philippe Germain. He then was hosted by the Lavelua with a traditional Kava Ceremony and feast on the mala'e of Sagato Soane Palace.

Sionepoe held a thanksgiving Mass at his place of birth, Vaitupu, Wallis and Futuna, on March 25. He is the second Wallisian to hold the position. He is also the second person born in Hihifo to hold the position, after Laurent Fuahea.

Sionepoe was named Metropolitan Archbishop of Nouméa in 2025.

== See also ==
- Roman Catholic Diocese of Wallis et Futuna
- Ghislain Marie Raoul Suzanne de Rasilly
- Laurent Fuahea
