= Michel Rittie =

André Michel Rittie is a former Ambassador Extraordinaire and Plenipotentiary of Vanuatu. Ritte was formerly accredited as Ambassador to Morocco. He served as the official representative of Vanuatu with residence in Rabat.

As a small nation with a resident population of 186,678 in 1999, Vanuatu maintains a full embassy only in China and Morocco as well as a Permanent Mission to the United Nations and a Consulate in Nouméa, the capital city of the French territory of New Caledonia. When representation is required in other countries, an ambassador in a neighbouring country may be concurrently accredited to that country. As the only Vanuatu ambassador in the region, Ritte has also been accredited as a non-resident ambassador to Sweden, Switzerland, Spain and Tunisia, as well as having served as Ambassador to the Holy See.

== Background ==
Until 2007, when France withdrew its claims for Matthew Island and Hunter Island east of New Caledonia, Vanuatu and France had disputed these small islands. A French national, Michel Rittie was originally nominated by the government of Vanuatu to serve as Vanuatu's consul in Paris, but the French government rejected his credentials. Although there was speculation in the news media, no official reason was given.

President John Bani of Vanuatu subsequently appointed Michel Rittie as consul-general to Morocco in March 2001. This accreditation was subsequently upgraded to Ambassador, with credentials accepted by King Mohammed VI on 26 September 2001.

Monsieur Rittie presented his credentials for the Holy See to Pope John Paul II in May 2003. John Paul II honoured the occasion with an address prepared for the occasion which acknowledged, "the rich historical patrimony of the Archipelago of Vanuatu and its special position in Oceania, factors that have shaped the nation and made it a multicultural society in which men and women today are eager to build a fraternal society in the vast diversity of their national origins, languages, forms of religious expression and the values that motivate them." Rittie continues to serve as a member of the diplomatic corps to the Holy See. On 15 April 2004 Rittie was one of eight ambassadors whose accreditation was accepted by then President Pascal Couchepin of Switzerland as nonresident ambassador (with residence in Rabat, Morocco). Rittie was accredited as ambassador to Spain on 29 June May 2005. Rittie has also presented his credentials to President Zine El Abidine Ben Ali of Tunisia and serves as Vanuatu's non-resident Ambassador there. Rittie has served as a member of delegations to UNESCO.
