= Archdiocese of Nouméa =

Latin Catholic archdiocese in New Caledonia

Coordinates: 22°16′33″S 166°27′29″E

Metropolitan Archdiocese of Nouméa Archidioecesis Metropolitae Numeanus Archidiocèse Metropolitain de Nouméa
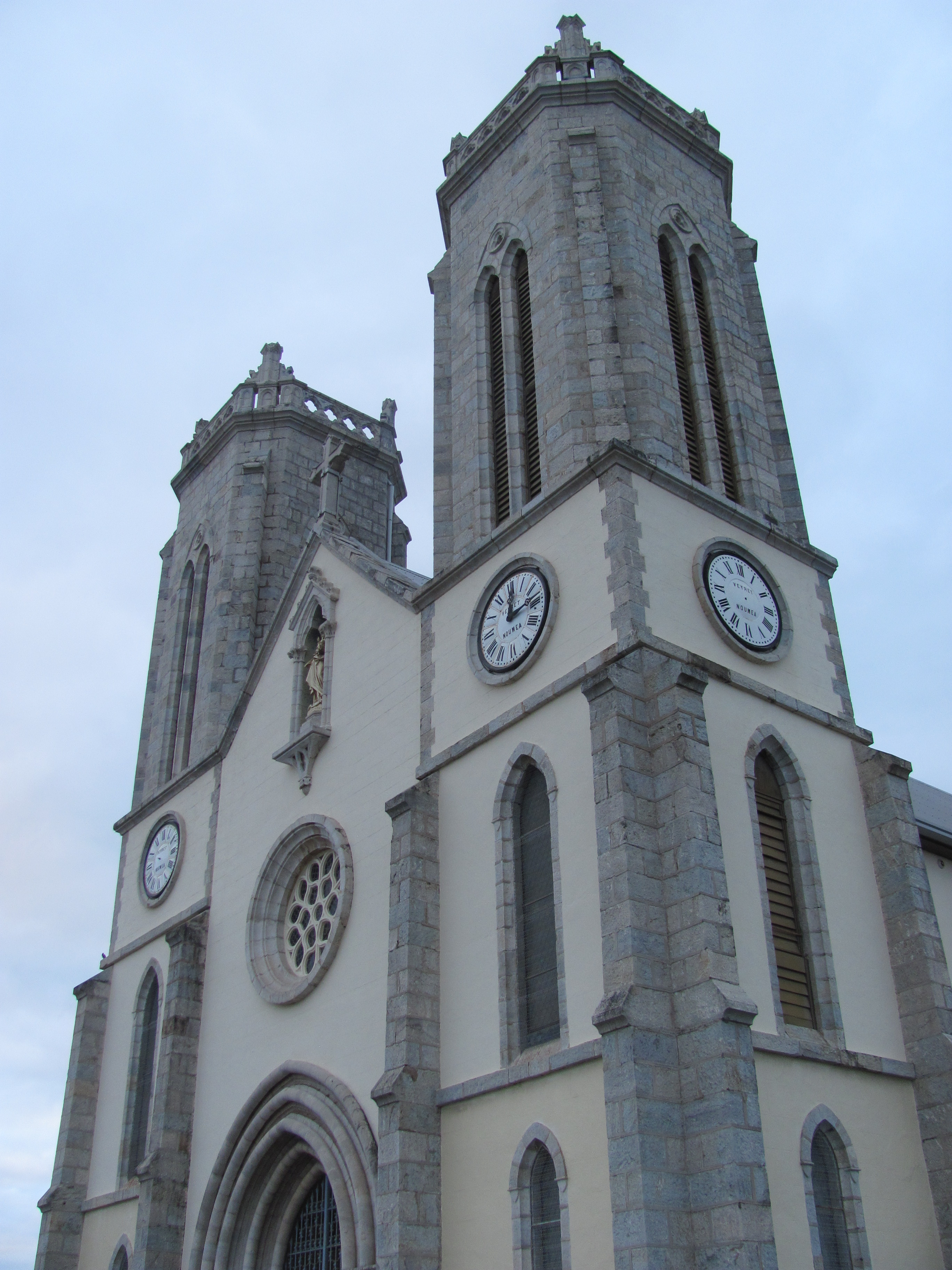
- Nouméa Cathedral

Location
- Country: New Caledonia, France
- Ecclesiastical province: Noumea

Statistics
- Area: 19,103 km^{2} (7,376 sq mi)
- Population: Total; Catholics: (as of 2004); 210,000; 110,000 (52.4%)

Information
- Denomination: Catholic
- Sui iuris church: Latin Church
- Rite: Roman Rite
- Established: 23 July 1847 (As Vicariate Apostolic of Nouvelle-Calédonie); 21 June 1966 (Archdiocese of Nouméa)
- Cathedral: Cathedral of St. Joseph in Nouméa

Current leadership
- Pope: Leo XIV
- Metropolitan Archbishop: Susitino Sionepoe
- Suffragans: Diocese of Wallis et Futuna; Diocese of Port-Vila
- Bishops emeritus: Michel-Marie-Bernard Calvet

Website
- Website of the Archdiocese

The Metropolitan Archdiocese of Nouméa (Latin: Archidioecesis Metropolitae Numeanus; French: Archidiocèse Metropolitain de Nouméa) is a Metropolitan Archdiocese in New Caledonia, established in 1966. It is responsible for the suffragan dioceses of Port-Vila and Wallis et Futuna.

== Beginnings ==
From early 1836 the territory of New Caledonia had been notionally part of the vast Vicariate Apostolic of Western Oceania, established by the Holy See on 10 January 1836. Given the immense dimensions of this Church jurisdiction, preliminary surveys on the spot soon gave rise to its gradual subdivision into smaller units, though these still covered enormous tracts of ocean, dotted with almost uncountable numbers of islands.

As part of this process, the history of the Catholic Church in New Caledonia took an important step closer to achieving formal shape on 27 June 1847, with the establishment of the Vicariate Apostolic of New Caledonia, from which the current Archdiocese largely derives.

The first head of the new Vicariate was, as is customary, a titular bishop. The choice fell on Bishop Guillaume Douarre, who had been a Marist Father and in 1842 had been appointed Coadjutor to the Vicar Apostolic of Central Oceania and ordained a bishop not many days later in Lyon, France, before setting sail for the Pacific islands, not yet 32 years of age. Once in New Caledonia, Bishop Douarre remained there only until 20 Aug 1850, when he was appointed Vicar Apostolic of the Archipelago of the Navigators. He died there not three years later, on 27 June 1853.

== Ordinaries ==
- Guillaume Douarre, S. M. (1847–1850), transferred then to be Vicar Apostolic of the Archipelago of the Navigators.
- Pierre Rougeyron, S. M. (1855–1873)
- Pierre-Ferdinand Vitte, S. M. (1873–1880)
- Alphonse-Hilarion Fraysse, S. M. (1880–1905)
- Claude-Marie Chanrion, S. M. (1905–1937)
- Édouard Bresson, S. M. (1937–1956)
- Pierre-Paul-Émile Martin, S. M. (1956–1972)
- Eugène Klein, M.S.C. (1972–1981)
- Michel-Marie-Bernard Calvet, S. M. (1981–14 January 2025)
- Susitino Sionepoe, S.M. (appointed 14 January 2025)

== External links and references ==
- "Archdiocese of Nouméa". Catholic-Hierarchy.
