= Michel-Marie Calvet =

New Caledonian archbishop (born 1944)

Michel-Marie Calvet S.M.
- Archbishop Emeritus of Nouméa
- Church: Catholic Church
- Archdiocese: Archdiocese of Nouméa
- In office: 19 June 1981 – 14 January 2025
- Predecessor: Eugène Klein
- Successor: Susitino Sionepoe
- Other post: Apostolic Administrator of Nouméa (January - April 2025)
- Previous posts: Titular Bishop of Nigrae Maiores (1979-1981); Auxiliary Bishop of Nouméa (1979-1981)

Orders
- Ordination: 28 April 1973 by Michel Mondésert
- Consecration: 4 November 1979 by Eugène Klein

Personal details
- Born: 3 April 1944 (age 82) Autun, Saône-et-Loire, Occupied France

Michel-Marie Bernard Calvet S.M. (born 3 April 1944 in Autun, France) is the French-born New Caledonian prelate who served as Archbishop of Nouméa from 19 June 1981 until his retirement on 14 January 2025. In this time, with more than 43 years, he was longest serving bishop.

== Ministry ==
Calvert was ordained as a Catholic priest in the Society of Mary on 28 April 1973.

On 4 July 1979 Calvert was appointed as an Auxiliary Bishop of the Archdiocese of Nouméa. He was simultaneously appointed Titular Bishop of Nigrae Maiores on the same day.

Michel-Marie Calvet was appointed Archbishop of Nouméa on 19 June 1981.

Michel-Marie Calvet said during the Day of Pentecost Sunday mass as a result of the 2024 New Caledonia unrest that the community had "betrayed our faith, our baptism and Jesus through its divisions." He also called on the public and leaders of New Caledonia to denounce violence and to work together for a "shared peaceful future, of lost and found fraternity."
