= Haute-Loire =

Department in Auvergne-Rhône-Alpes, France

Haute-Loire Naut Léger (Occitan)
- Department of France
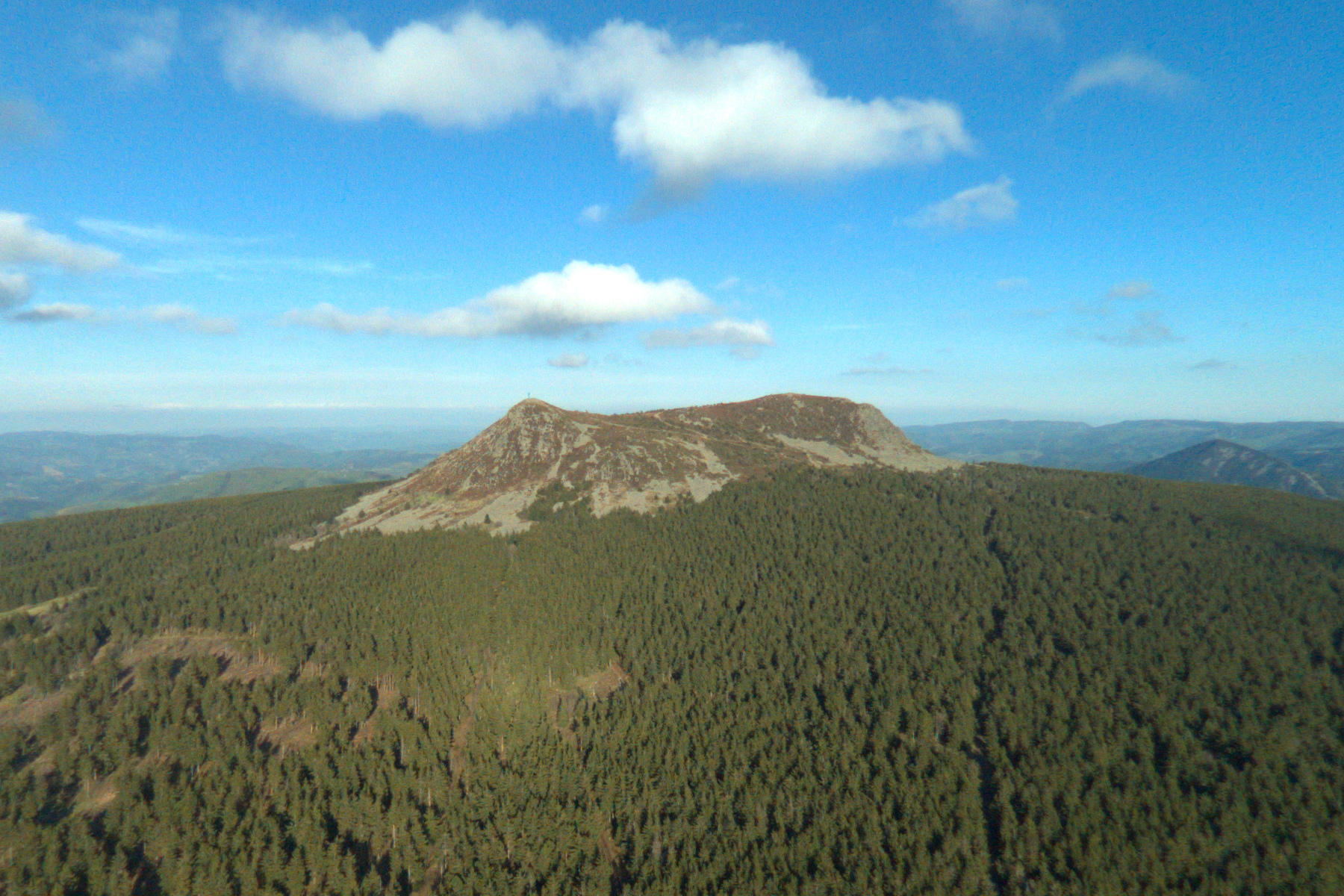
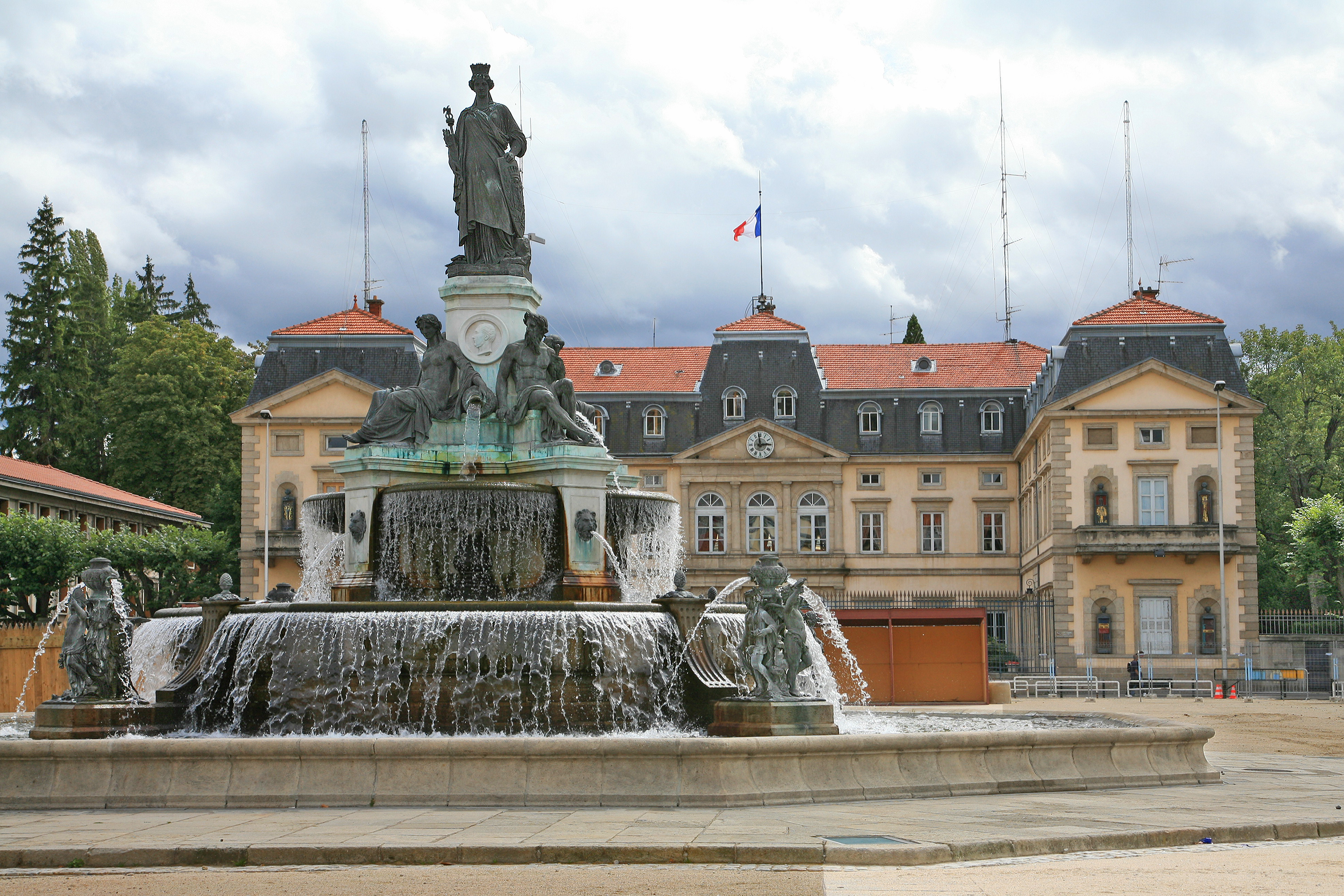
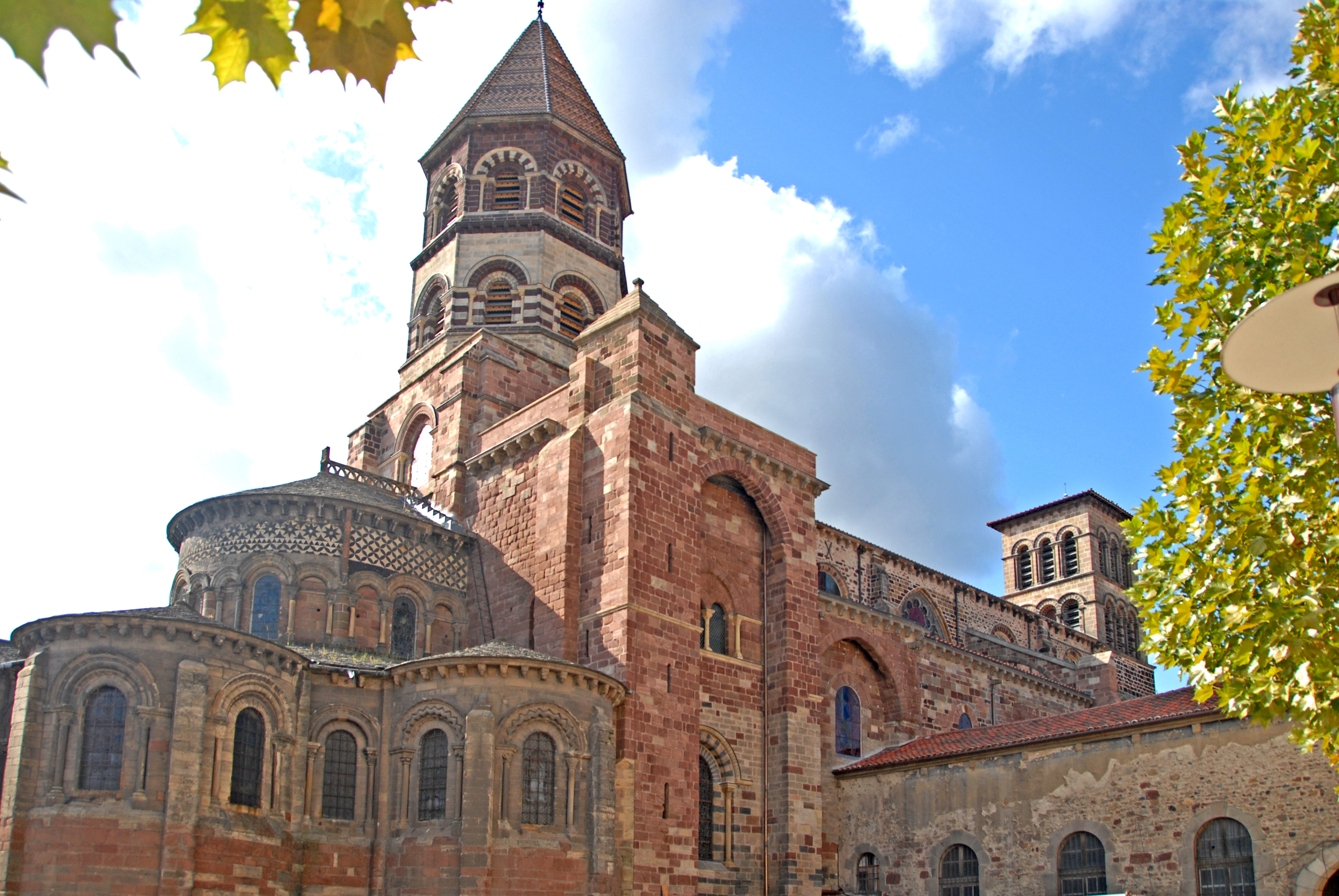
- From top to bottom, left to right: Mont Mézenc, prefecture building in Le Puy-en-Velay, and St Julien Basilica in Brioude

- Flag Coat of arms

- Location of Haute-Loire in France
- Coordinates: 45°0′N 4°0′E
- Country: France
- Region: Auvergne-Rhône-Alpes
- Prefecture: Le Puy-en-Velay
- Subprefectures: Brioude; Yssingeaux

Government
  - President of the Departmental Council: Marie-Agnès Petit (LR)

Area^{1}
  - Total: 4,977 km^{2} (1,922 sq mi)

Population (2023)
  - Total: 228,654
  - Rank: 87th
  - Density: 45.94/km^{2} (119.0/sq mi)
- Time zone: UTC+1 (CET)
  - Summer (DST): UTC+2 (CEST)
- Department number: 43
- Arrondissements: 3
- Cantons: 19
- Communes: 257
- ^1 French Land Register data, which exclude estuaries and lakes, ponds and glaciers larger than 1 km^{2}

Haute-Loire (French pronunciation: [ot lwaʁ]; Occitan: Naut Léger or Naut Leir; English: Upper Loire) is a landlocked department in the Auvergne-Rhône-Alpes region of south-central France. Named after the Loire River, it is surrounded by the departments of Loire, Ardèche, Lozère, Cantal and Puy-de-Dôme. In 2023, it had a population of 228,654; its inhabitants are called Altiligériens in French (English : Altiligerians).

The department, which has its prefecture in Le Puy-en-Velay, covers the upper reaches of the Loire and consists of the Loire Valley and the surrounding mountains in the Massif Central. It is one of the original 83 departments of France created in 1790 during the French Revolution. Parts of the department are included in the Livradois-Forez Regional Natural Park.

== History ==
The first known inhabitants of this region were hunter-gatherers and it was later occupied by pastoralists, shepherds living in caves or simple huts. It later came under the control of a Gaulish tribe called Vellavi and at the time of Julius Caesar's Gallic Wars, this area lay on the border of Gallia Narbonensis. The area became a Roman province in 121 BC, originally under the name Gallia Transalpina (Transalpine Gaul). The name distinguished it from Cisalpine Gaul on the near side of the Alps to Rome. In 40 BC, during the Second Triumvirate, Lepidus was given responsibility for Narbonese Gaul (along with Hispania and Africa), while Mark Antony was given the balance of Gaul.

The area was ravaged by barbarian invasions in the last years of the Roman Empire, and Galla Narbonensis and surrounding areas were incorporated into the Visigothic Kingdom between 462 and 477 AD, permanently ending the political control of Rome. After the Gothic takeover, the Visigothic dominions were generally known as Septimania. The king of the Visigoths, Alaric I was killed at the Battle of Vouillé in 507, a battle won by Clovis I and Velay came under Frankish rule. On Clovis' death in 511, his kingdom was divided among his four sons, and Velay was included in the part of the king of Austrasia, then part of the French kingdom. These subdivisions were united under the auspices of his longest surviving son Chlothar I, only to be split again under his four sons at his death. It was reunited once more under Chlothar II who became the sole ruler of the Frankish people in 613.

In about 928, the area became a fiefdom of the Count of Toulouse, and later came under the control of the Count of Poitiers. In 1137, Eleanor of Aquitaine succeeded to the Duchy of Aquitaine and her marriage to Henry, Duke of Normandy, who later became Henry II of England, brought Auvergne under English rule. By the end of the thirteenth century the area was known as the Dauphiné d’Auvergne.

Haute-Loire is one of the original 83 departments created during the French Revolution on 4 March 1790, by order of the National Constituent Assembly. The new departments were to be uniformly administered and approximately equal to one another in size and population. Haute-Loire was formed from parts of the former provinces of Auvergne, Languedoc, and Lyonnais. Two thirds of the department, centred on Le Puy-en-Velay, used to be part of the former province of Languedoc and is known as Velay. The geographical distance from Toulouse had allowed this region to enjoy a great deal of autonomy.

During the Second World War, French partisans aided by Allied supply drops and leaders were able to liberate the province from Germans. By mid-August 1944 five weeks after the invasion at Normandy, Le Puy-en-Velay was besieged. Roads, railroad and telephone lines were cut. On 18 August, the Germans attempted to escape in a fifty-truck convoy. Five hundred were captured, and about 150 killed in a massive ambush. The town fell the next day. Estivareilles in nearby Loire fell on 22 August. Paris was captured by conventional forces on 24 August.

== Geography ==
Haute-Loire is a department in south central France and is part of the region of Auvergne-Rhône-Alpes. The capital and largest town in the department is Le Puy-en-Velay. To the north of Haute-Loire lie Puy-de-Dôme and Loire, to the east lies Ardèche, to the south lies Lozère and to the west lies Cantal. The river Loire rises in the southern part of the department and flows northwards, creating a wide valley. On either side of this lie ranges of mountains in the Massif Central. The north part of the department is part of the Livradois-Forez Regional Natural Park, a protected area of traditionally-farmed agricultural land and woodland, covering a total area of 297,000 hectares (730,000 acres).

The department has four mountain ranges running north and south. These are the Haut-Vivarais and its continuation, the Boutières range, the Massif du Meygal, the Velay mountains and the Margeride Mountains.

The highest point of the department is the Mont Mézenc (1753 m) and its average elevation is 719 m. The two-thirds of the area is over 800 m and the lowest point is 393 m.

Historically, Velay has been associated with the traditional region of Vivarais, now part of Ardèche. The two regions share a common dialect which is similar to that spoken in the south of Dauphiné, the reason probably being associated with the trade links between the two regions.

== Demographics ==
Historical population

Year	Pop.	±% p.a.
1801	229,773	—
1821	276,830	+0.94%
1831	292,078	+0.54%
1841	298,137	+0.21%
1851	304,615	+0.22%
1861	305,521	+0.03%
1872	308,732	+0.10%
1881	316,461	+0.28%
1891	316,735	+0.01%
1901	314,058	−0.08%
1911	303,838	−0.33%
1921	268,910	−1.21%
1931	251,608	−0.66%

Year	Pop.	±% p.a.
1936	245,271	−0.51%
1946	228,076	−0.72%
1954	215,577	−0.70%
1962	211,036	−0.27%
1968	208,337	−0.21%
1975	205,491	−0.20%
1982	205,895	+0.03%
1990	206,568	+0.04%
1999	209,113	+0.14%
2007	220,437	+0.66%
2012	225,686	+0.47%
2017	227,283	+0.14%
2023	228,654	+0.10%

=== Principal towns ===
The most populous commune is Le Puy-en-Velay, the prefecture. As of 2023, there are 6 communes with more than 5,000 inhabitants:

Commune	Population (2023)
Le Puy-en-Velay	18,540
Monistrol-sur-Loire	8,823
Yssingeaux	7,415
Brioude	6,527
Aurec-sur-Loire	6,164
Sainte-Sigolène	6,097

== Politics ==
The president of the Departmental Council is Marie-Agnès Petit, elected in July 2021.

=== Current National Assembly Representatives ===
Constituency	Member	Party
Haute-Loire's 1st constituency	Laurent Wauquiez	The Republicans
Haute-Loire's 2nd constituency	Jean-Pierre Vigier	The Republicans

== Notable people ==
Claude-Jean Allouez (1622–1689) was born in Saint-Didier-en-Velay. He was a Jesuit missionary and explorer in North America who is said to have converted ten thousand Native Americans. The town of Allouez, Wisconsin is named after him. The de Polignac family has its historic seat in the department, and various descendants of General Lafayette were senators for this region in the nineteenth century. The black metal band Peste Noire comes from the city La Chaise-Dieu. The Château de Chavaniac, located in the commune, was the birthplace of Gilbert du Motier, Marquis de Lafayette in 1757. Originally named Chavaniac, the commune was renamed Chavaniac-Lafayette in 1884 in honor of its most famous resident.

== Tourism ==
The department has attractive landscapes and is popular with tourists. Le Puy-en-Velay has a historic cathedral at which pilgrims gather before starting their journey to Santiago de Compostela. The cathedral has been a UNESCO World Heritage Site since 1998, as part of the "Routes of Santiago de Compostela in France". Another site of pilgrimage is at Saint Michel d'Aiguilhe, a twelfth century chapel on top of a rocky pinnacle approached by a flight of 268 steps.

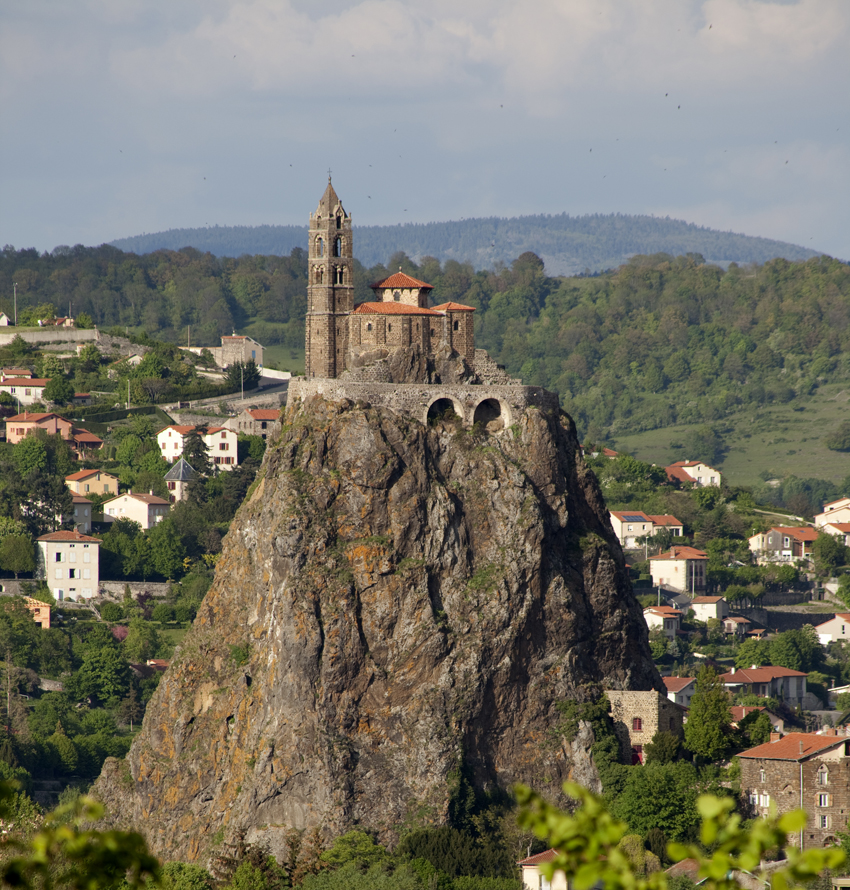
Le Puy-en-Velay

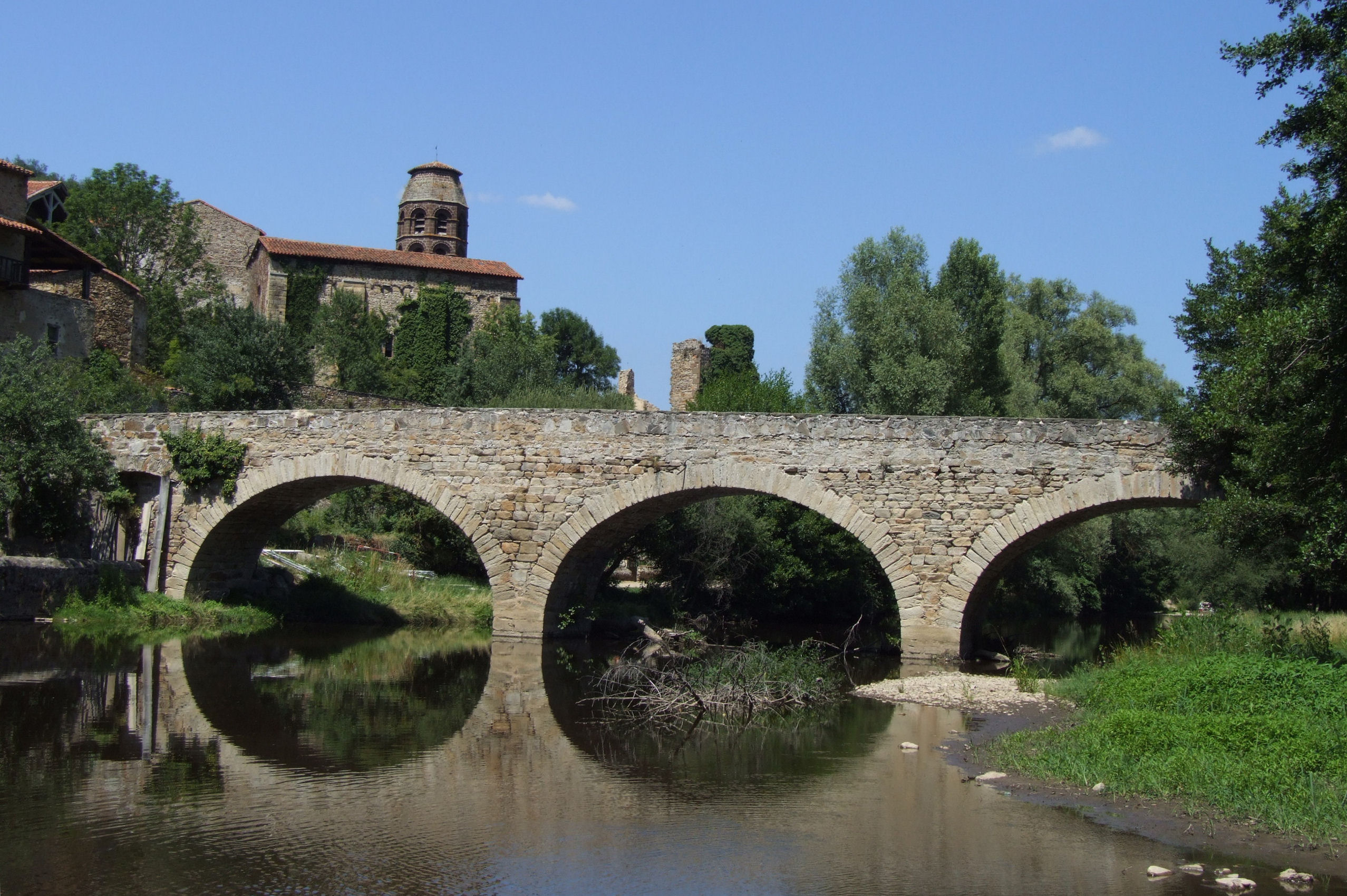
Lavaudieu

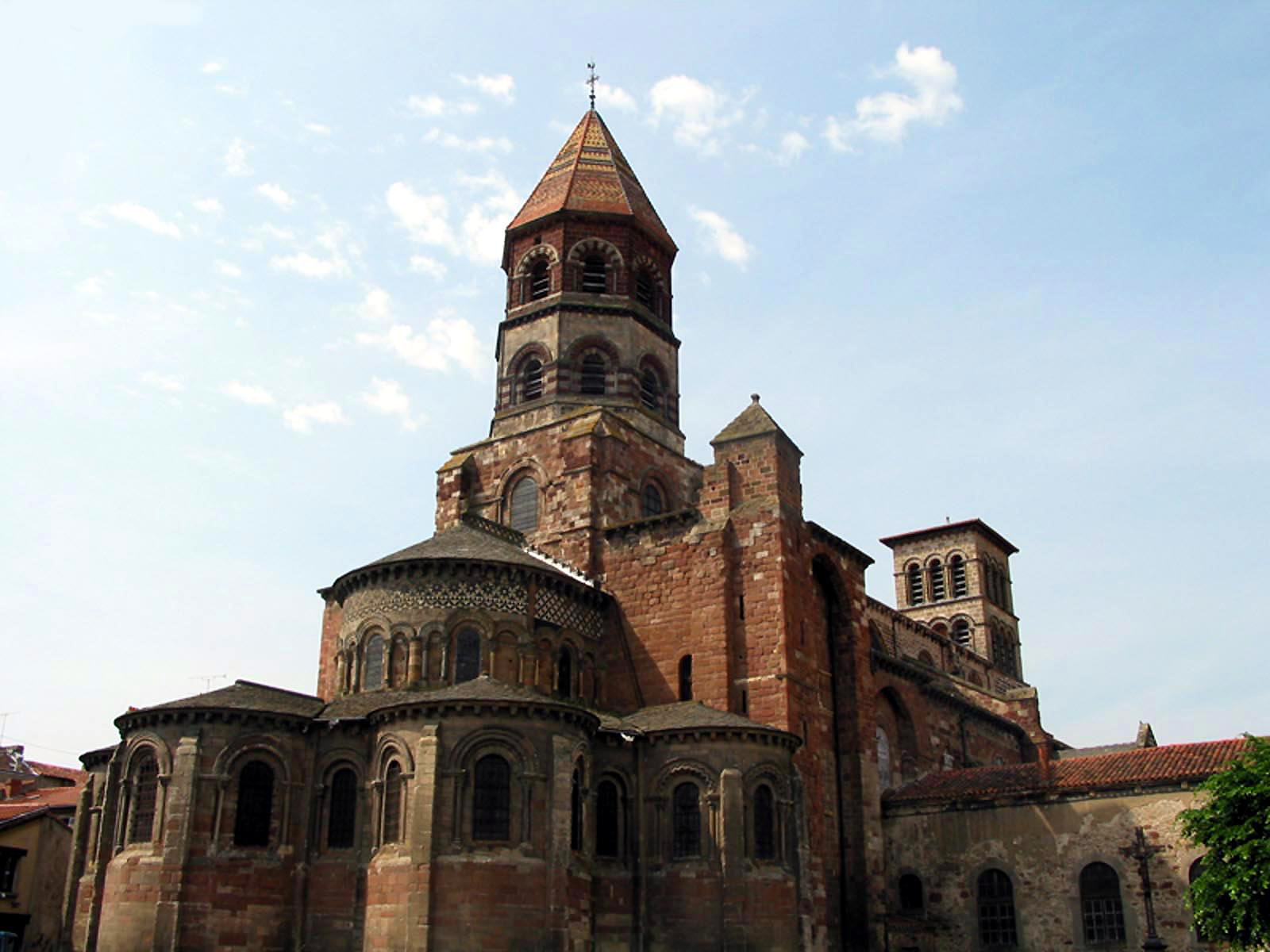
Brioude

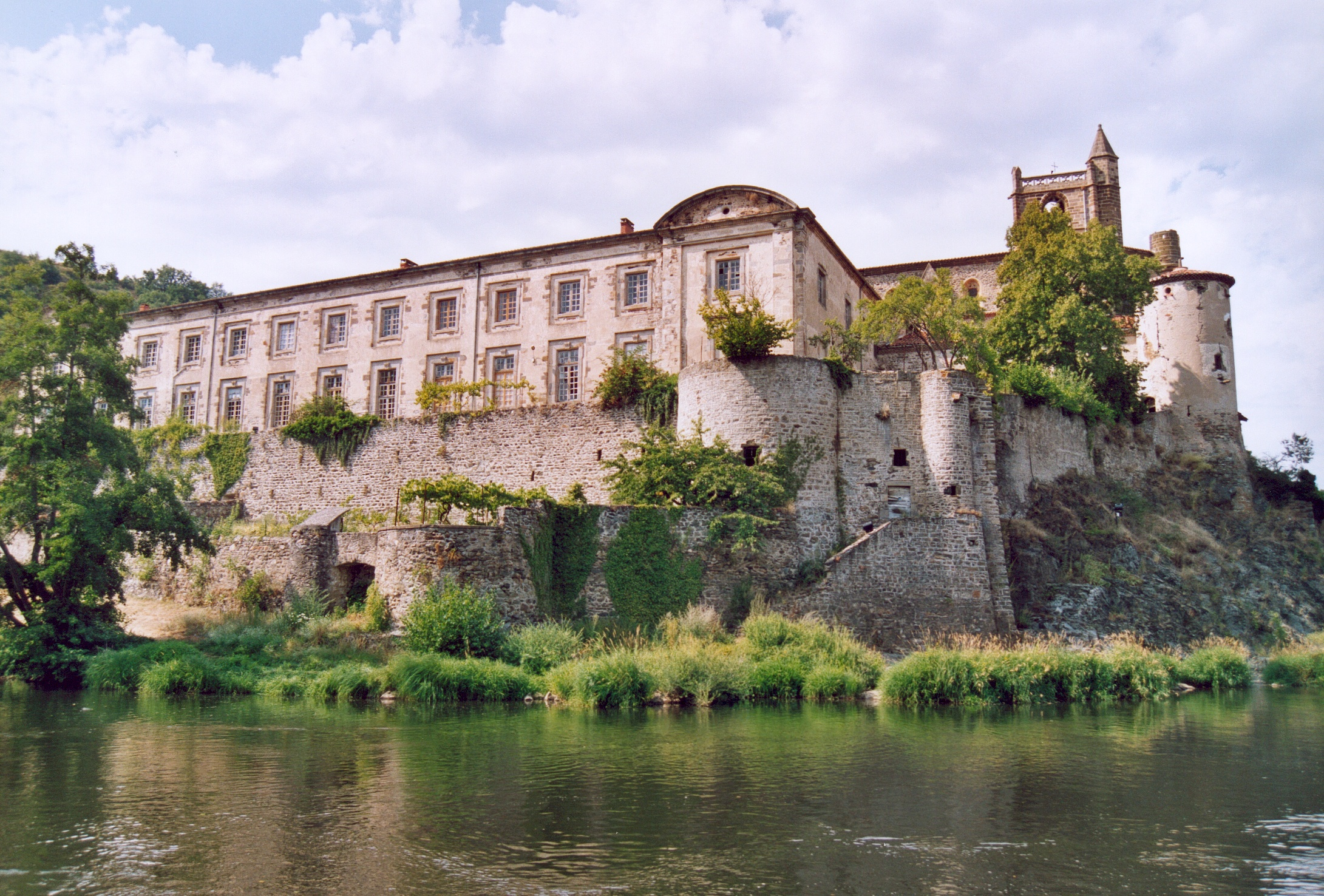
Lavoûte-Chilhac

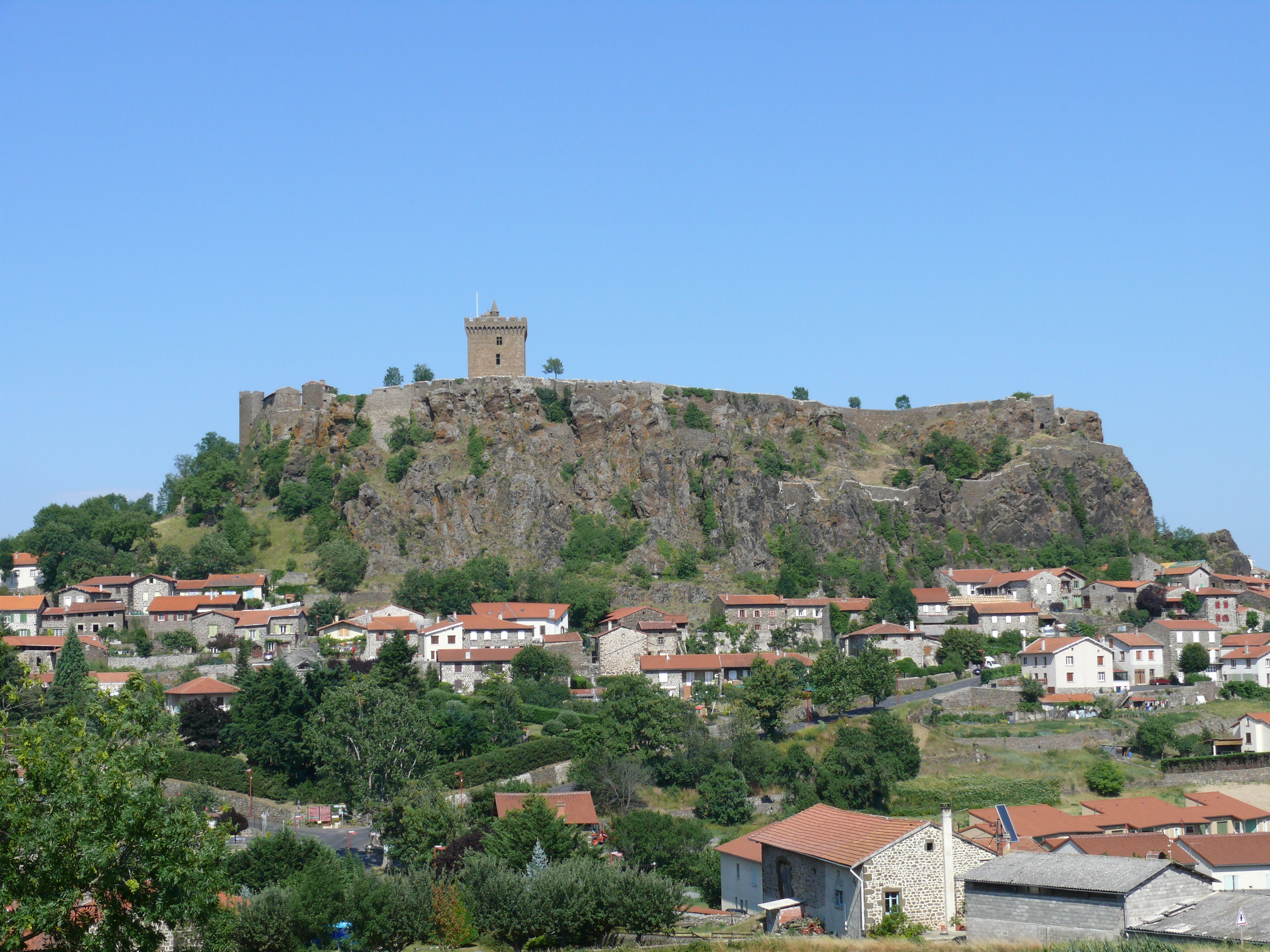
Polignac, Haute-Loire

== See also ==
- Cantons of the Haute-Loire department
- Communes of the Haute-Loire department
- Arrondissements of the Haute-Loire department
