= Diocese of Wallis et Futuna =

Catholic diocese in the South Pacific

Coordinates: 13°17′S 176°11′W

Diocese of Wallis et Futuna Dioecesis Uveanus et Futunensis Diocèse de Wallis et Futuna
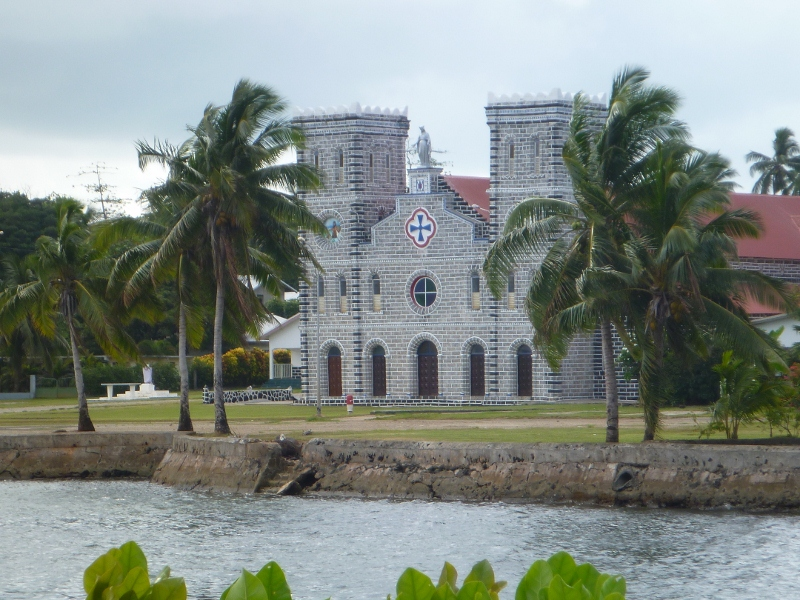
- Cathedral of Our Lady of the Assumption

Location
- Country: Wallis and Futuna, France
- Ecclesiastical province: Nouméa
- Metropolitan: Archdiocese of Nouméa

Statistics
- Area: 256 km^{2} (99 sq mi)
- Population: Total; Catholics: (as of 2010); 14,231; 13,631 (95.8%)

Information
- Denomination: Catholic
- Sui iuris church: Latin Church
- Rite: Roman Rite
- Established: 11 November 1935 (As Vicariate Apostolic of Wallis et Futuna); 21 June 1966 (As Diocese of Wallis et Futuna)
- Cathedral: Cathedral of Our Lady of the Assumption, Mata-Utu
- Patron saint: Peter Chanel

Current leadership
- Pope: Leo XIV
- Bishop: sede vacante
- Metropolitan Archbishop: Susitino Sionepoe, S.M.
- Bishops emeritus: Ghislain Marie Raoul Suzanne de Rasilly, S.M.

The Roman Catholic Diocese of Wallis et Futuna (Latin: Dioecesis Uveanus et Futunensis; French: Diocèse de Wallis et Futuna) in Wallis and Futuna is a suffragan diocese of the Roman Catholic Archdiocese of Nouméa. It was built as a Vicariate Apostolic in 1935 and elevated to a diocese in 1966. The Bishop of Wallis et Futuna is a member of the Episcopal Conference of the Pacific. The Diocese played a very crucial role in the propagation of Catholicism in Polynesia.

== History ==
The diocese is the French diocese furthest from mainland France, about 16,000 km away. Its history is closely tied to the Marists. Pierre Bataillon on Wallis and Pierre Chanel on Futuna arrived in 1837. Wallis had become Catholic by 1840, while Chanel was killed on Futuna in 1841 and became the first canonised martyr of the Pacific Islands mission. Catholicism spread with little opposition from other religions, and nearly all of the territory's roughly 12,000 inhabitants are baptised.

The territory is divided into three customary kingdoms recognised by a 1961 statute, which Bishop de Rasilly called a major challenge for the local Church in 2019. By 2000, the diocese's priests were native Polynesians. Susitino Sionepoe, born on Wallis, was ordained priest in 1993 and consecrated bishop in the Wallis cathedral in March 2019. He was named Archbishop of Nouméa on 14 January 2025, and his installation took place on 12 April 2025. He is the first Pacific Islander to lead that archdiocese.
