= Inventory Controversy =

1905 protests against anticlericalism in France

The Inventory Controversy
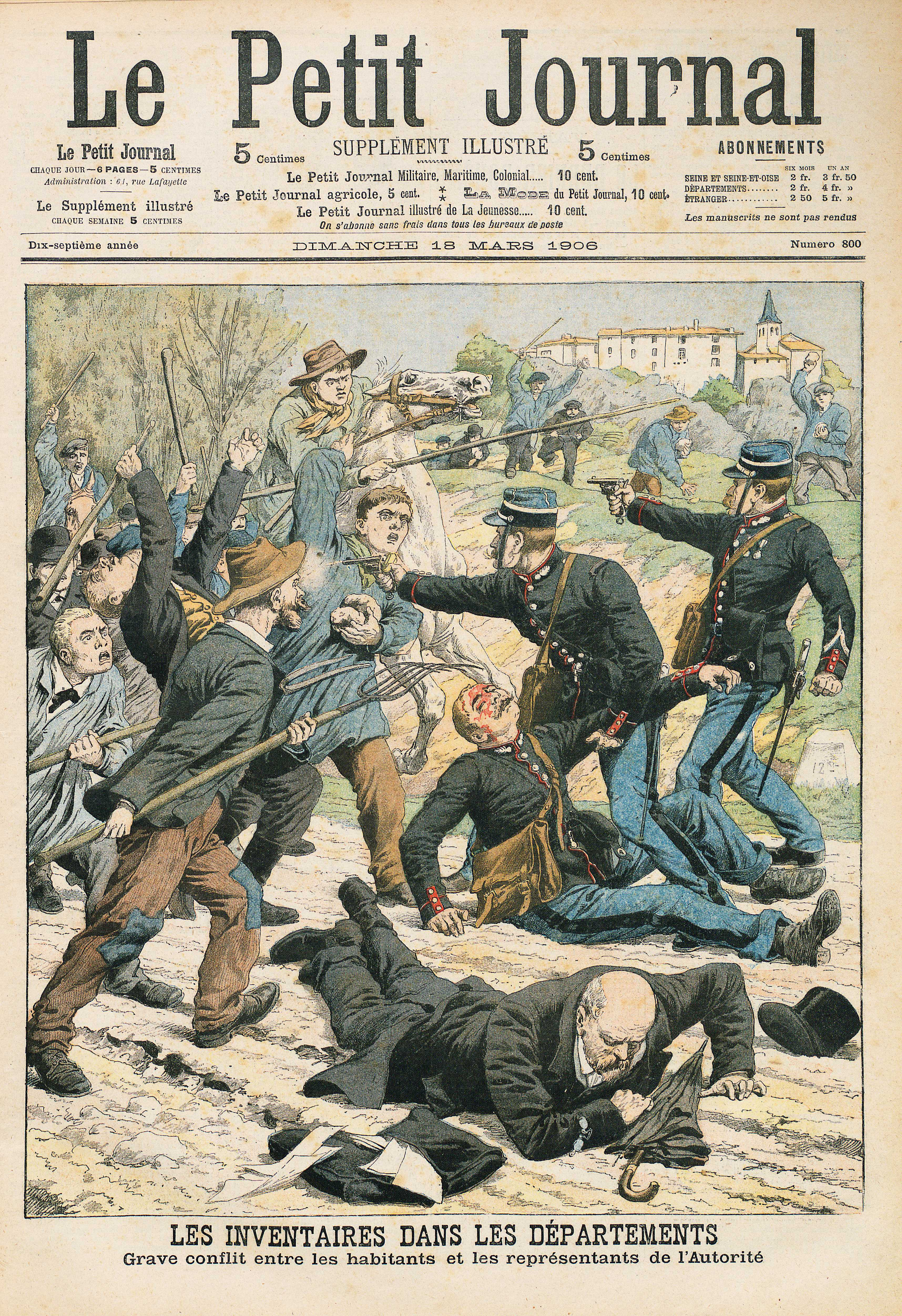
- "Inventories in the departments. Serious conflict between residents and representatives of the authorities" (Le Petit Journal, March 18, 1906).
- Native name: Querelle des Inventaires
- Location: France
- Deaths: 2

The Inventory Controversy (Querelle des Inventaires) refers to a series of incidents across France following the 1905 French law on the Separation of the Churches and the State. This law required the inventory of church property as part of preparations for transferring it to newly created religious associations. The law was enacted in the context of widespread Catholic opposition to the secularization policies of the Third French Republic.

== Background ==
Since the 1801 Concordat, church properties were managed by public establishments such as fabric councils and seminaries. Article 4 of the 1905 law dissolved these establishments and transferred church buildings to religious associations. To implement the transfer, the law mandated an inventory of all church property. The decree of 29 December 1905 formalized this requirement, though it was perceived by many as a "prelude to confiscation."

On January 2, 1906, a government circular instructed officials to open tabernacles during inventories, fueling outrage among Catholics. This directive was later clarified, but not before sparking protests.

== Protests ==
The controversy led to widespread demonstrations in Catholic regions, including Brittany, Normandy, the Vendée, and the Massif Central. Protestors often barricaded themselves in churches, viewing the inventories as acts of profanation and expropriation. In some cases, local populations resisted violently, leading to clashes with police and military forces.

The first significant conflict occurred in Haute-Loire on February 27, 1906, during the inventory of the Notre-Dame d'Estours Chapel in Monistrol-d'Allier. Demonstrators armed with sticks and metal bars attacked officials, resulting in injuries. Further incidents occurred, including the death of a protestor in Montregard on March 3, 1906.

One of the most tragic events took place in Boeschepe on March 6, 1906, where a butcher named Géry Ghysel was killed during a confrontation. This incident prompted the government to suspend the inventories temporarily in some areas.

== Government Response ==
The protests caused political upheaval, contributing to the fall of the Maurice Rouvier government on March 7, 1906. His successor, Georges Clemenceau, adopted a more conciliatory approach. On March 20, 1906, Clemenceau declared in Parliament that "counting candlesticks in a church is not worth a human life."

Clemenceau instructed officials to suspend inventories in the face of resistance. His measures helped de-escalate tensions, and the controversy gradually subsided.

== Legacy ==
The Inventory Controversy highlighted the deep divisions between secular and religious factions in early 20th-century France. It also underscored the challenges of implementing the separation of church and state in a predominantly Catholic nation.
