= Lapte =

- Commune
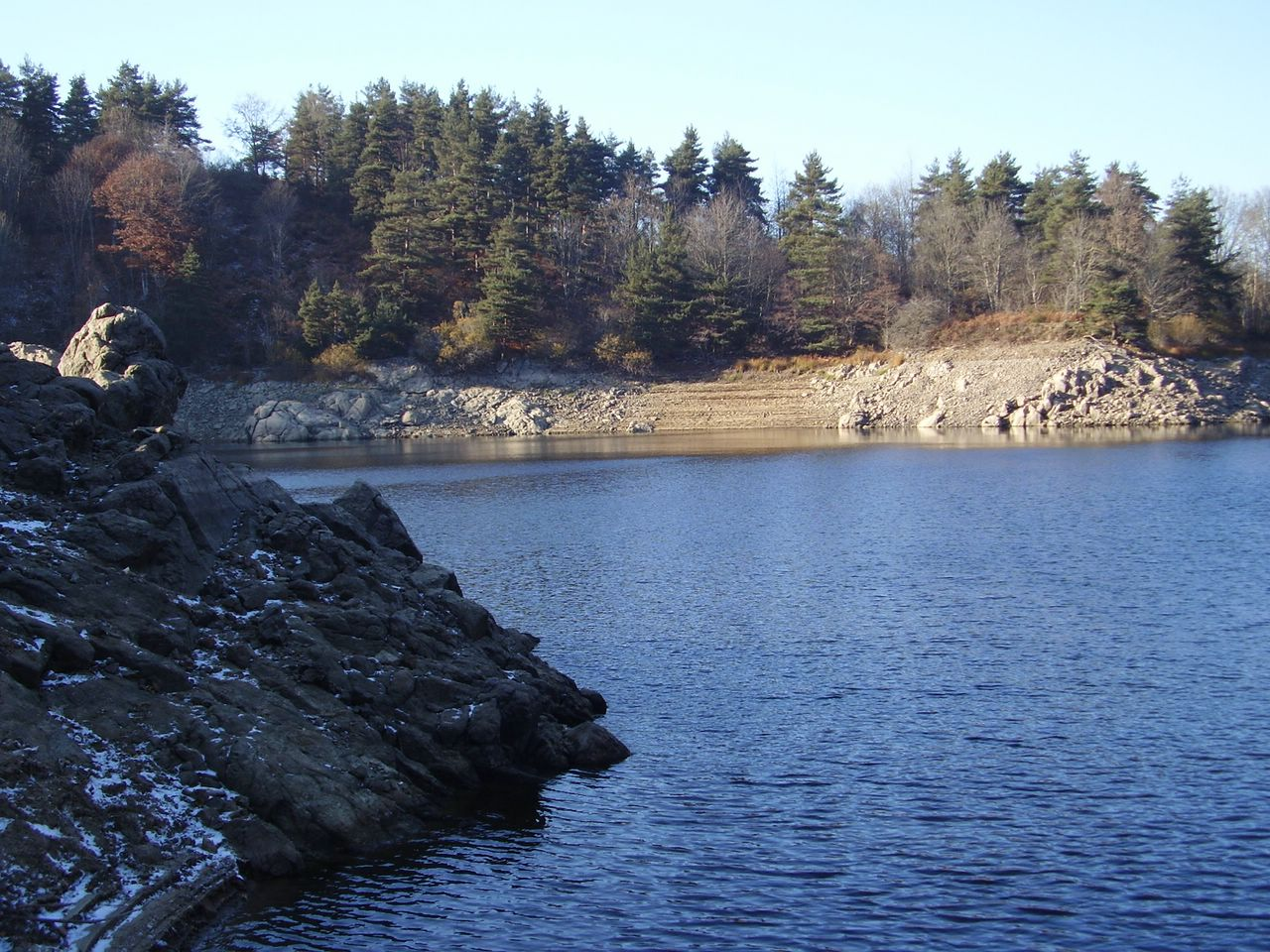
- Lac de Lavalette
- Location of Lapte
- Location within France Location within Auvergne-Rhône-Alpes
- Coordinates: 45°11′11″N 4°13′04″E
- Country: France
- Region: Auvergne-Rhône-Alpes
- Department: Haute-Loire
- Arrondissement: Yssingeaux
- Canton: Yssingeaux

Government
  - Mayor (2022–2026): Huguette Liogier
- Area^{1}: 30.75 km^{2} (11.87 sq mi)
- Elevation: 843 m (2,766 ft)
- Highest elevation: 914 m (2,999 ft)
- Lowest elevation: 600 m (2,000 ft)
- Population (2023): 1,806
  - Density: 58.73/km^{2} (152.1/sq mi)
- Time zone: UTC+01:00 (CET)
  - Summer (DST): UTC+02:00 (CEST)
- INSEE/Postal code: 43114 /43200
- ^{1} French Land Register data, which excludes lakes, ponds, glaciers > 1 km^{2} (0.386 sq mi or 247 acres) and river estuaries.

Lapte (French pronunciation: [lapt]) is a commune in the Haute-Loire department in south-central France, located 23 kilometres (15 miles) southwest of Firminy. Lapte is surrounded by the communes Grazac, Chenereilles and Raucoules.

== Geography ==
The municipality of Lapte covers 30.8 square kilometres (12 sq. mi.). It is located at 860 metres (2822 feet) above the river Lignon du Velay to its south. The Dunières, a tributary of the Lignon du Velay, forms part of its northern border.

== Population ==
Historical population
Year	Pop.	±% p.a.
1968	1,260	—
1975	1,274	+0.16%
1982	1,163	−1.29%
1990	1,107	−0.61%
1999	1,253	+1.39%
2007	1,458	+1.91%
2012	1,617	+2.09%
2017	1,715	+1.18%
2023	1,806	+0.87%
Source: INSEE

== See also ==
- Communes of the Haute-Loire department
