= Chenereilles =

Chenereilles may refer to the following places in France:

- Chenereilles, Loire, a commune in the Loire department
- Chenereilles, Haute-Loire, a commune in the Haute-Loire department
