= Notre-Dame d'Estours Chapel =

Catholic chapel in Monistrol-d'Allier, Haute-Loire, France

Notre-Dame-d'Estours Chapel
- Chapelle Notre-Dame-d'Estours
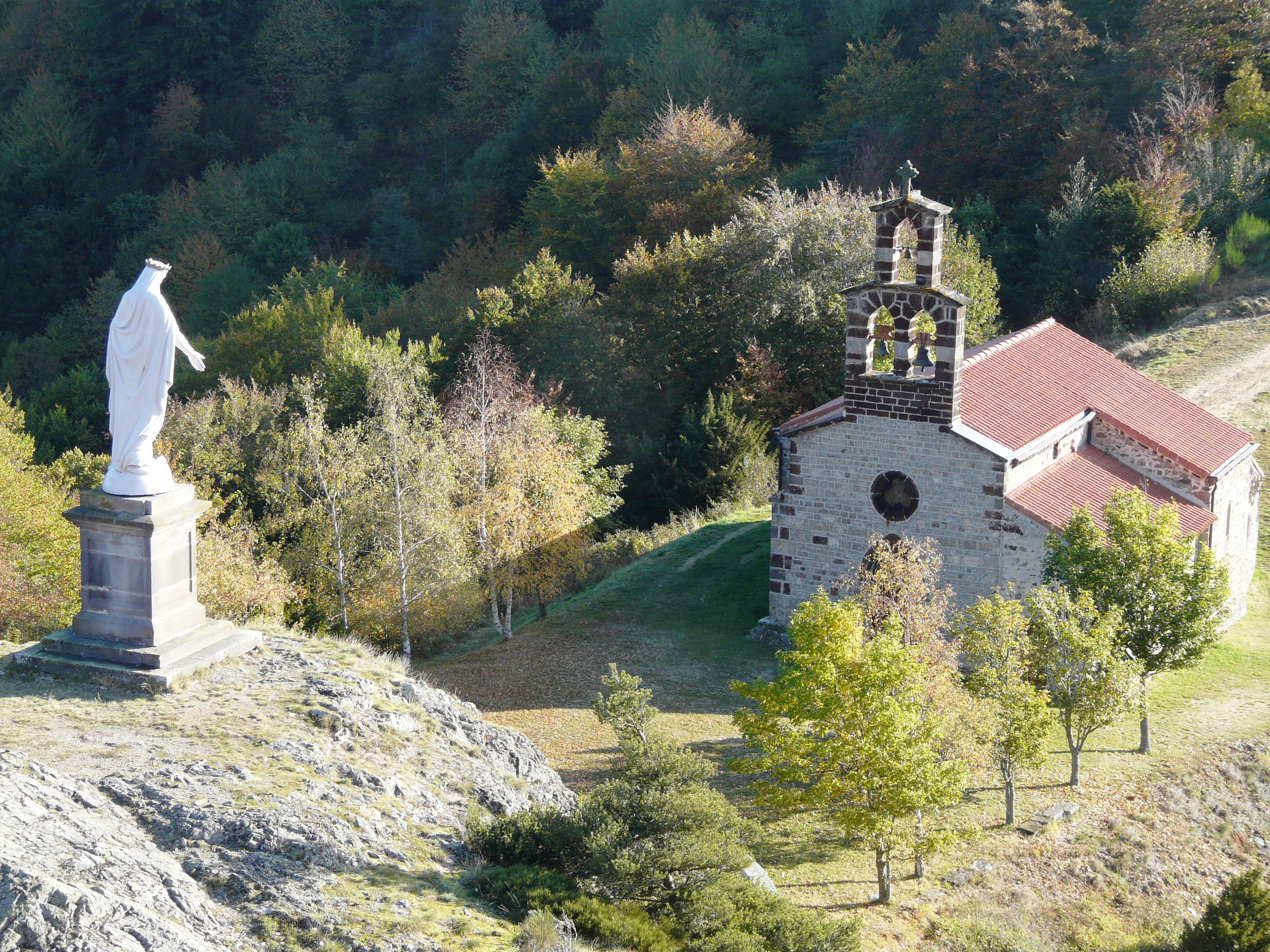
- Notre-Dame-d'Estours Chapel
- 45°00′15″N 3°35′23″E
- Location: Monistrol-d'Allier, Haute-Loire, France
- Denomination: Catholic Church

Architecture
- Functional status: Active
- Heritage designation: Monument historique
- Designated: 1926
- Architectural type: Chapel
- Style: Romanesque, Gothic
- Completed: 12th century

Administration
- District: Haute-Loire

The Notre-Dame-d'Estours Chapel (French: Chapelle Notre-Dame-d'Estours) is a Roman Catholic chapel located in Monistrol-d'Allier, within the department of Haute-Loire, France. It has been listed as a Monument historique since 1926.

== Location ==
Situated at an altitude of 820 meters, the chapel is perched on a rocky promontory overlooking the gorges of the Seuge River.

== History ==
The chapel was built in the 12th century as a pilgrimage site. The choir is vaulted with ribs from this period, while the existing vaults date from the 13th century. The additional chapels, also rib-vaulted, are believed to have been constructed during the 15th century.

=== Querelle des Inventaires ===
During the Querelle des Inventaires in 1906, the chapel became a focal point of resistance to the 1905 French law on the Separation of the Churches and the State. On February 27, 1906, at the hamlet of Champels, the chapel was targeted for an inventory of its contents. This action, mandated by the state, led to a violent confrontation when 150 protesters armed with sticks, forks, and iron bars attacked the inventory officials and accompanying gendarmes. The ensuing conflict resulted in four protesters being lightly injured.

== Architecture ==
The chapel features a semi-circular apse vaulted in a half-dome style. Inside, five decorative arcades rest on small columns with Byzantine-style capitals. The choir and transept are in Romanesque style, while the later additions, including chapels, exhibit Gothic influences.

== Bibliography ==
- Claude Tavernier (1970). "L'inventaire de Champels du mardi 27 février 1906 et ses répercussions nationales". Almanach de Brioude.
- Jean Barthomeuf (1996). "Deux vierges romanes au canton de Saugues (Haute-Loire): Notre-Dame d'Estours et Notre-Dame de Saugues". Cahiers de la Haute-Loire.
