= Joseph Bonet de Treyches =

Joseph-Balthazar Bonet de Treyches (28 March 1757 – 8 August 1828) was a politician during the French Revolution.

== Life ==
Born in Saint-Jeures (now in Haute-Loire), Bonet was a lawyer at Le Puy-en-Velay. He became a judge of peace in the district of Monistrol-sur-Loire and administrator of the Haute-Loire department at the beginning of the French Revolution, while his father sat on the Estates General of 1789. He succeeds him on the benches of the National Convention. Moderate, he voted for the call to the people, for death and for reprieve during the trial of Louis XVI. Linked to the Girondins, without really being part of their group, he was charged on 3 October 1793, but managed to take refuge in Switzerland while his father was imprisoned in Le Puy, accused of federalism.

He returned to the Convention after the fall of Maximilien Robespierre (9 thermidor year II - 27 July 1794). He was in charge of a mission in Ardèche, Haute-Loire and Loire for the surveillance of mines and weapons factories. Until 1797, he was a member of the Council of Five Hundred, then was appointed as Government Commissioner of the Théâtre de la République et des Arts, as co-director and then interim director.

From December 1802 to September 1803, he was accounting agent for the same Opera under the direction of Étienne Morel de Chédeville and then became director again until 1807.

He finally entered the Corps législatif in December 1809. Exiled in 1816 to Brussels, he was allowed to return to France in 1818, not being a full regicide.

He died in Paris at age 71.

== Sources ==
- "Joseph Bonet de Treyches", in Adolphe Robert and Gaston Cougny, Dictionnaire des parlementaires français (1789–1891), Bourloton, Paris, 1889 Edition details Wikisource
- File on the site of the French Assemblée nationale

Preceded by Louis-Joseph Francœur; Delesne and Baco	Director of the Théâtre de la République et des Arts; 1799-1800; With: Jacques de Vismes	Succeeded by Jacques de Vismes
Preceded by Étienne Morel de Chédeville	Director of the Paris Opera; 1803-1807	Succeeded by Louis-Benoît Picard
