= Tence =

- Commune
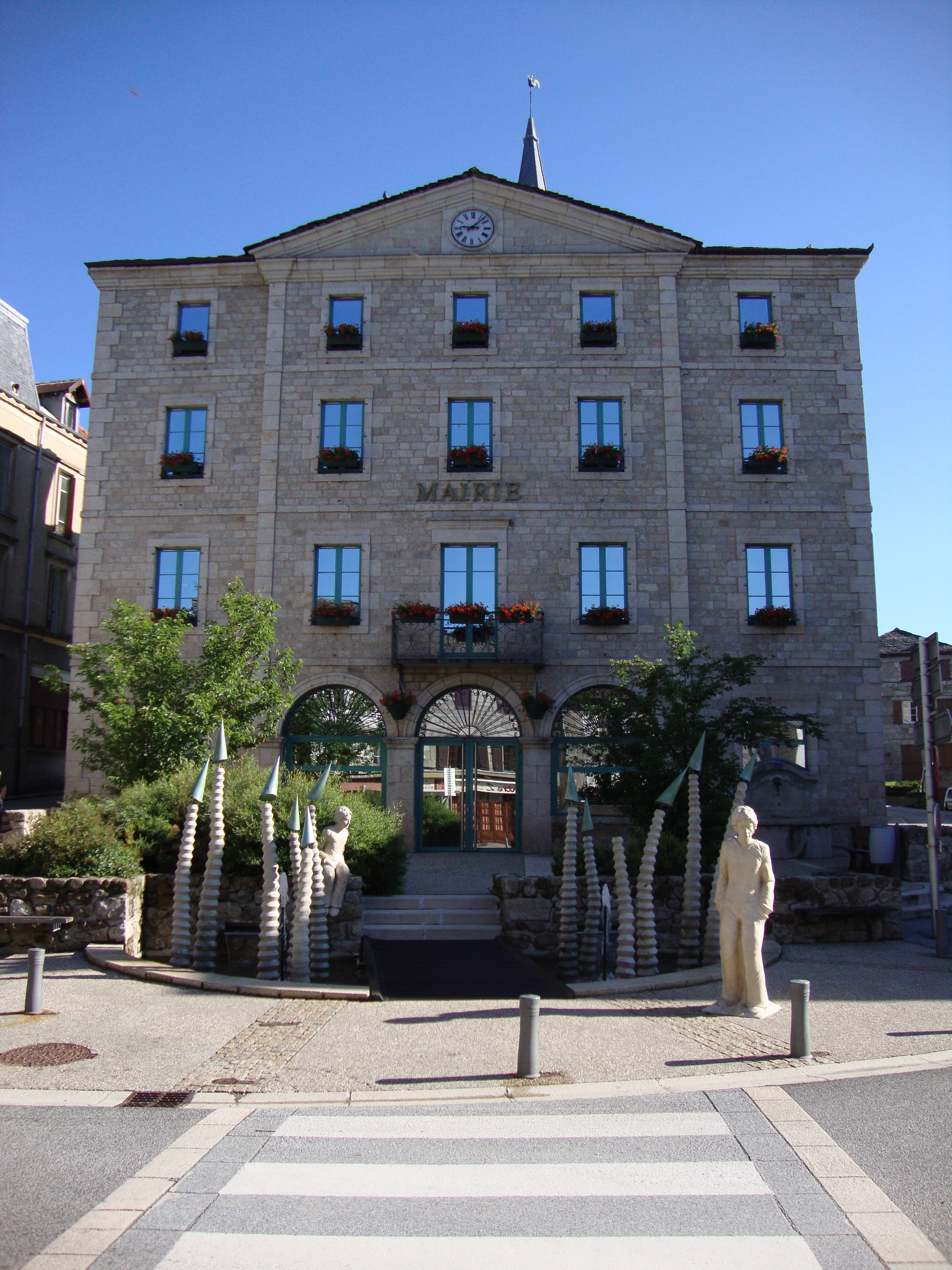
- Town hall

- Coat of arms
- Location of Tence
- Location within France Location within Auvergne-Rhône-Alpes
- Coordinates: 45°06′54″N 4°17′24″E
- Country: France
- Region: Auvergne-Rhône-Alpes
- Department: Haute-Loire
- Arrondissement: Yssingeaux
- Canton: Boutières

Government
  - Mayor (2021–2026): David Salque-Pradier
- Area^{1}: 52.12 km^{2} (20.12 sq mi)
- Elevation: 851 m (2,792 ft)
- Highest elevation: 1,127 m (3,698 ft)
- Lowest elevation: 803 m (2,635 ft)
- Population (2023): 3,111
  - Density: 59.69/km^{2} (154.6/sq mi)
- Time zone: UTC+01:00 (CET)
  - Summer (DST): UTC+02:00 (CEST)
- INSEE/Postal code: 43244 /43190
- ^{1} French Land Register data, which excludes lakes, ponds, glaciers > 1 km^{2} (0.386 sq mi or 247 acres) and river estuaries.

Tence (French pronunciation: [tɑ̃s]; Occitan: Tença) is a commune in the Haute-Loire department in south-central France.

== Geography ==
The river Lignon du Velay flows through the commune.

== Population ==
Historical population

Year	Pop.	±% p.a.
1793	4,872	—
1821	5,418	+0.38%
1846	6,158	+0.51%
1872	4,693	−1.04%
1901	4,856	+0.12%
1926	3,863	−0.91%
1946	3,264	−0.84%
1962	2,949	−0.63%
1968	2,953	+0.02%

Year	Pop.	±% p.a.
1975	2,821	−0.65%
1982	2,716	−0.54%
1990	2,788	+0.33%
1999	2,890	+0.40%
2007	3,272	+1.56%
2012	3,158	−0.71%
2017	3,098	−0.38%
2023	3,111	+0.07%

Source: EHESS and INSEE (1968-2023)

== See also ==
- Communes of the Haute-Loire department
