= Canton of Monistrol-sur-Loire =

Coordinates: 45.29°N 4.17°E

The canton of Monistrol-sur-Loire is an administrative division of the Haute-Loire department, south-central France. Its borders were modified at the French canton reorganisation which came into effect in March 2015. Its seat is in Monistrol-sur-Loire.

It consists of the following communes:

1. La Chapelle-d'Aurec
2. Monistrol-sur-Loire
3. Saint-Maurice-de-Lignon
4. Les Villettes
