= Saint-Maurice-de-Lignon =

- Commune
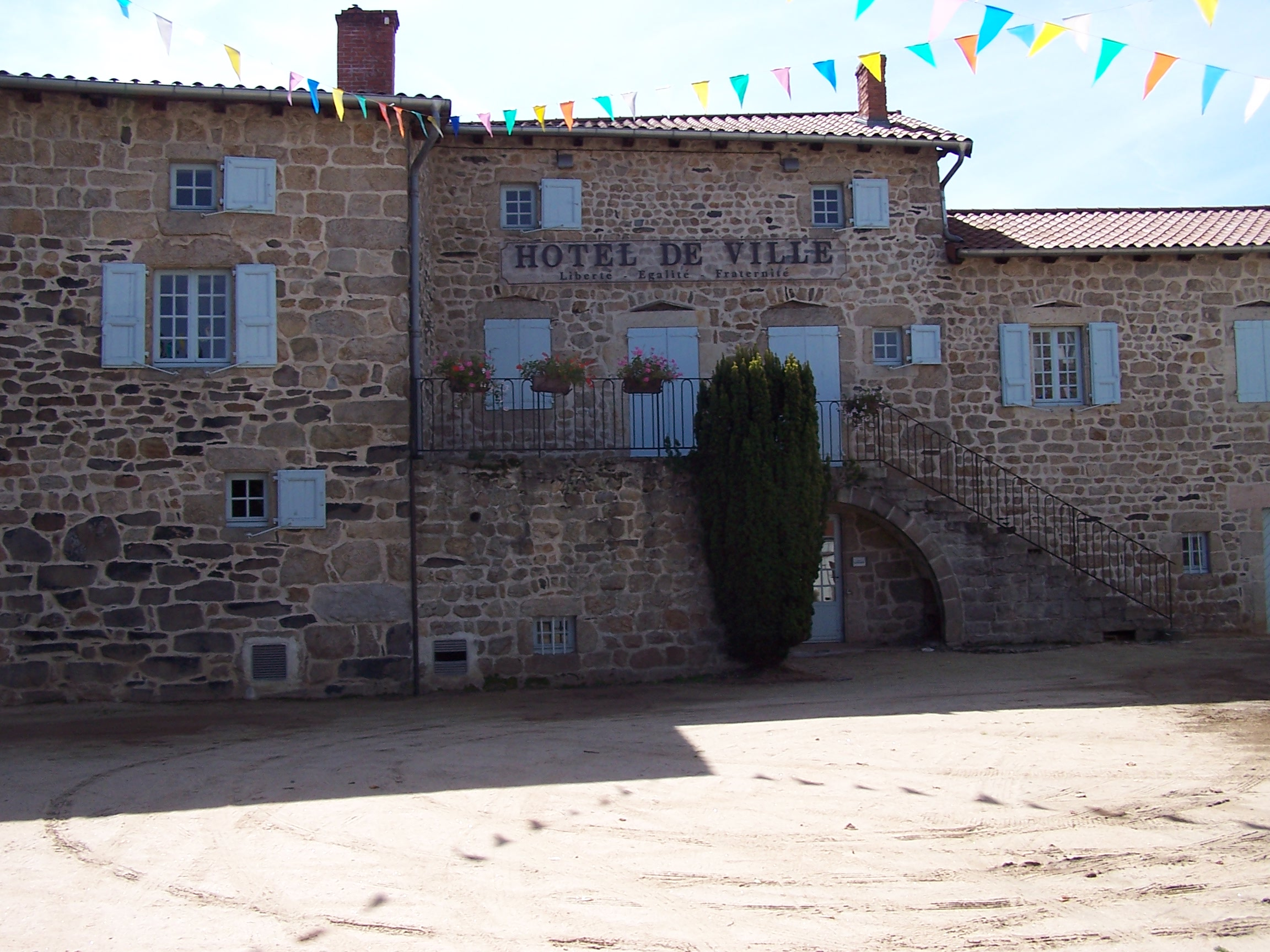
- Town hall
- Location of Saint-Maurice-de-Lignon
- Location within France Location within Auvergne-Rhône-Alpes
- Coordinates: 45°13′30″N 4°08′23″E
- Country: France
- Region: Auvergne-Rhône-Alpes
- Department: Haute-Loire
- Arrondissement: Yssingeaux
- Canton: Monistrol-sur-Loire
- Intercommunality: Sucs

Government
  - Mayor (2020–2026): Alain Fournier
- Area^{1}: 30.23 km^{2} (11.67 sq mi)
- Elevation: 740 m (2,430 ft)
- Highest elevation: 892 m (2,927 ft)
- Lowest elevation: 461 m (1,512 ft)
- Population (2023): 2,688
  - Density: 88.92/km^{2} (230.3/sq mi)
- Time zone: UTC+01:00 (CET)
  - Summer (DST): UTC+02:00 (CEST)
- INSEE/Postal code: 43211 /43200
- ^{1} French Land Register data, which excludes lakes, ponds, glaciers > 1 km^{2} (0.386 sq mi or 247 acres) and river estuaries.

Saint-Maurice-de-Lignon (French pronunciation: [sɛ̃ mɔʁis də liɲɔ̃]; literally "Saint-Maurice of Lignon") is a commune in the Haute-Loire department in south-central France.

== Geography ==
The river Lignon du Velay flows through the commune.

== Population ==
Historical population

Year	Pop.	±% p.a.
1793	1,801	—
1821	2,014	+0.40%
1846	2,264	+0.47%
1872	1,999	−0.48%
1901	2,244	+0.40%
1926	1,904	−0.66%
1946	1,391	−1.56%
1962	1,413	+0.10%
1968	1,429	+0.19%

Year	Pop.	±% p.a.
1975	1,528	+0.96%
1982	1,573	+0.42%
1990	1,635	+0.48%
1999	1,803	+1.09%
2007	2,258	+2.85%
2012	2,465	+1.77%
2017	2,597	+1.05%
2023	2,688	+0.58%

Source: EHESS and INSEE (1968-2023)

== See also ==
- Communes of the Haute-Loire department
