= Yssingeaux =

- Subprefecture
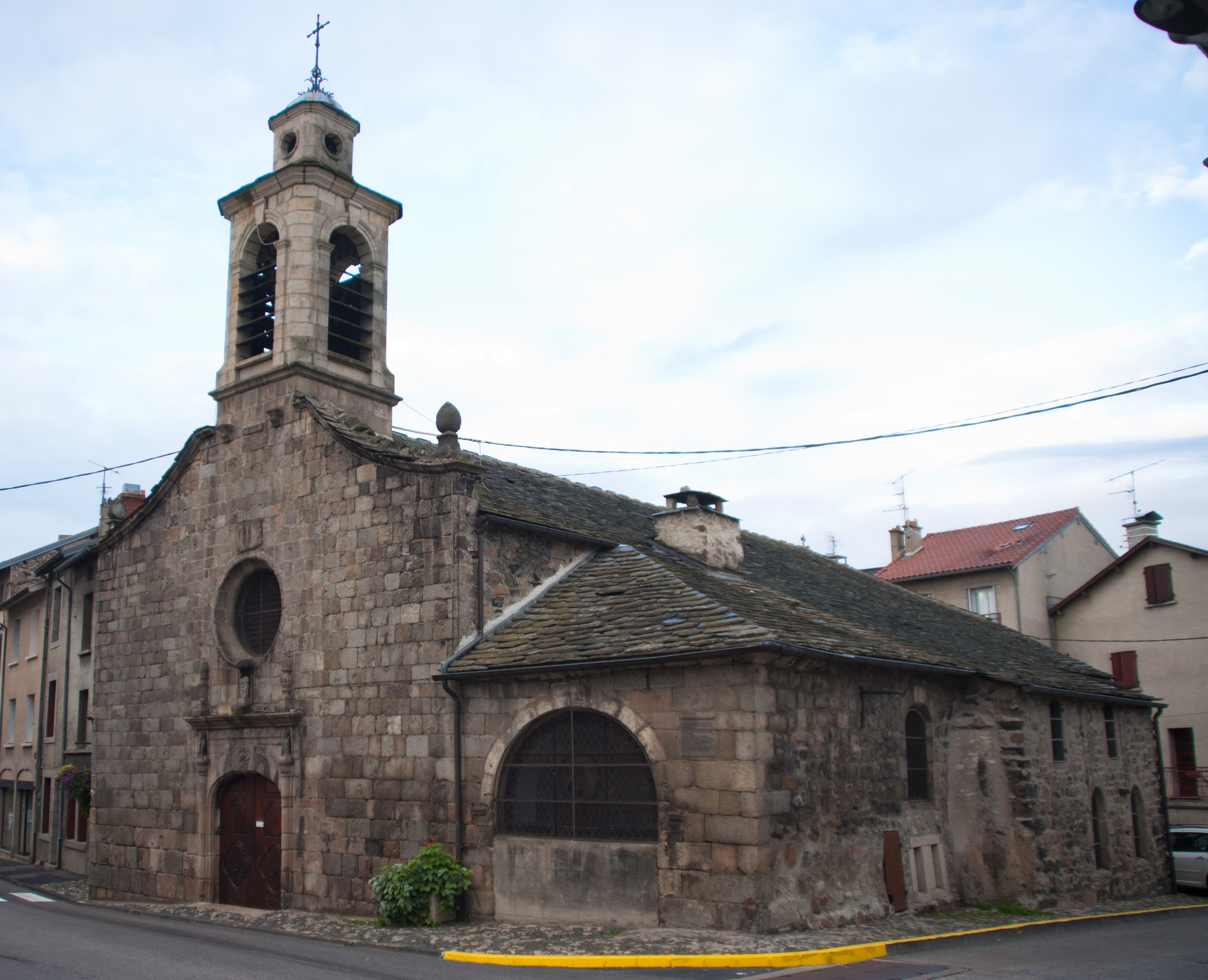

- Coat of arms
- Location of Yssingeaux
- Location within France Location within Auvergne-Rhône-Alpes
- Coordinates: 45°08′37″N 4°07′28″E
- Country: France
- Region: Auvergne-Rhône-Alpes
- Department: Haute-Loire
- Arrondissement: Yssingeaux
- Canton: Yssingeaux
- Intercommunality: Sucs

Government
  - Mayor (2020–2026): Pierre Liogier
- Area^{1}: 80.57 km^{2} (31.11 sq mi)
- Elevation: 840 m (2,760 ft)
- Highest elevation: 1,320 m (4,330 ft)
- Lowest elevation: 589 m (1,932 ft)
- Population (2023): 7,415
  - Density: 92.03/km^{2} (238.4/sq mi)
- Time zone: UTC+01:00 (CET)
  - Summer (DST): UTC+02:00 (CEST)
- INSEE/Postal code: 43268 /43200
- ^{1} French Land Register data, which excludes lakes, ponds, glaciers > 1 km^{2} (0.386 sq mi or 247 acres) and river estuaries.

Yssingeaux (French pronunciation: [isɛ̃ʒo]; Occitan: Sinjau) is a commune and subprefecture in the Haute-Loire department in south-central France.

It is situated between Le Puy-en-Velay and Firminy.

== Geography ==
The river Lignon du Velay flows through the commune.

== Population ==
Historical population
Year	Pop.	±% p.a.
1968	5,565	—
1975	5,878	+0.78%
1982	6,228	+0.83%
1990	6,118	−0.22%
1999	6,492	+0.66%
2007	6,931	+0.82%
2012	7,101	+0.49%
2017	7,202	+0.28%
2023	7,415	+0.49%
Source: INSEE

== See also ==
- Communes of the Haute-Loire department
