= Mars, Ardèche =

Mars
- Commune
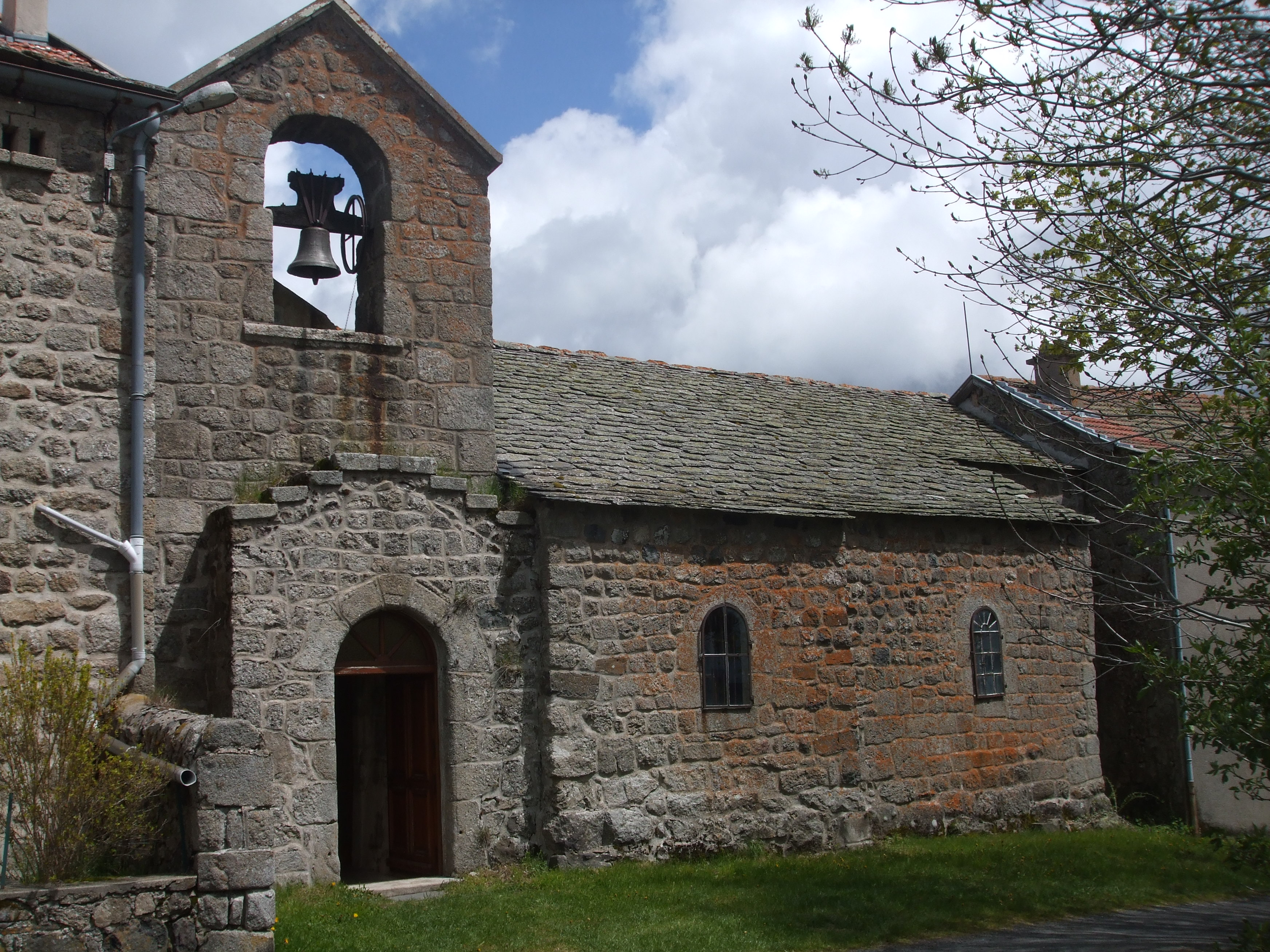
- The church of Saint Romain, in the commune of Mars
- Location of Mars
- Location within France Location within Auvergne-Rhône-Alpes
- Coordinates: 45°01′20″N 4°19′19″E
- Country: France
- Region: Auvergne-Rhône-Alpes
- Department: Ardèche
- Arrondissement: Tournon-sur-Rhône
- Canton: Haut-Eyrieux
- Intercommunality: Val'Eyrieux

Government
  - Mayor (2020–2026): Françoise Roche
- Area^{1}: 18.69 km^{2} (7.22 sq mi)
- Elevation: 1,100 m (3,600 ft)
- Highest elevation: 1,138 m (3,734 ft)
- Lowest elevation: 759 m (2,490 ft)
- Population (2023): 243
  - Density: 13.0/km^{2} (33.7/sq mi)
- Time zone: UTC+01:00 (CET)
  - Summer (DST): UTC+02:00 (CEST)
- INSEE/Postal code: 07151 /07320
- ^{1} French Land Register data, which excludes lakes, ponds, glaciers > 1 km^{2} (0.386 sq mi or 247 acres) and river estuaries.

Mars (Occitan: Març) is a commune in the Ardèche department in southern France.

== Geography ==
The river Lignon du Velay forms part of the commune's northwest border.

== Population ==
Historical population
Year	Pop.	±% p.a.
1968	396	—
1975	295	−4.12%
1982	244	−2.68%
1990	181	−3.66%
1999	216	+1.98%
2007	284	+3.48%
2012	275	−0.64%
2017	264	−0.81%
2023	243	−1.37%
Source: INSEE

== See also ==
- Communes of the Ardèche department
