= Canton of Boutières =

Coordinates: 45.11°N 4.29°E

The canton of Boutières is an administrative division of the Haute-Loire department, south-central France. It was created at the French canton reorganisation which came into effect in March 2015. Its seat is in Tence.

It consists of the following communes:

1. Chenereilles
2. Dunières
3. Le Mas-de-Tence
4. Montfaucon-en-Velay
5. Montregard
6. Raucoules
7. Riotord
8. Saint-Bonnet-le-Froid
9. Saint-Jeures
10. Saint-Julien-Molhesabate
11. Saint-Romain-Lachalm
12. Tence
