= Saint-Julien-du-Pinet =

- Commune
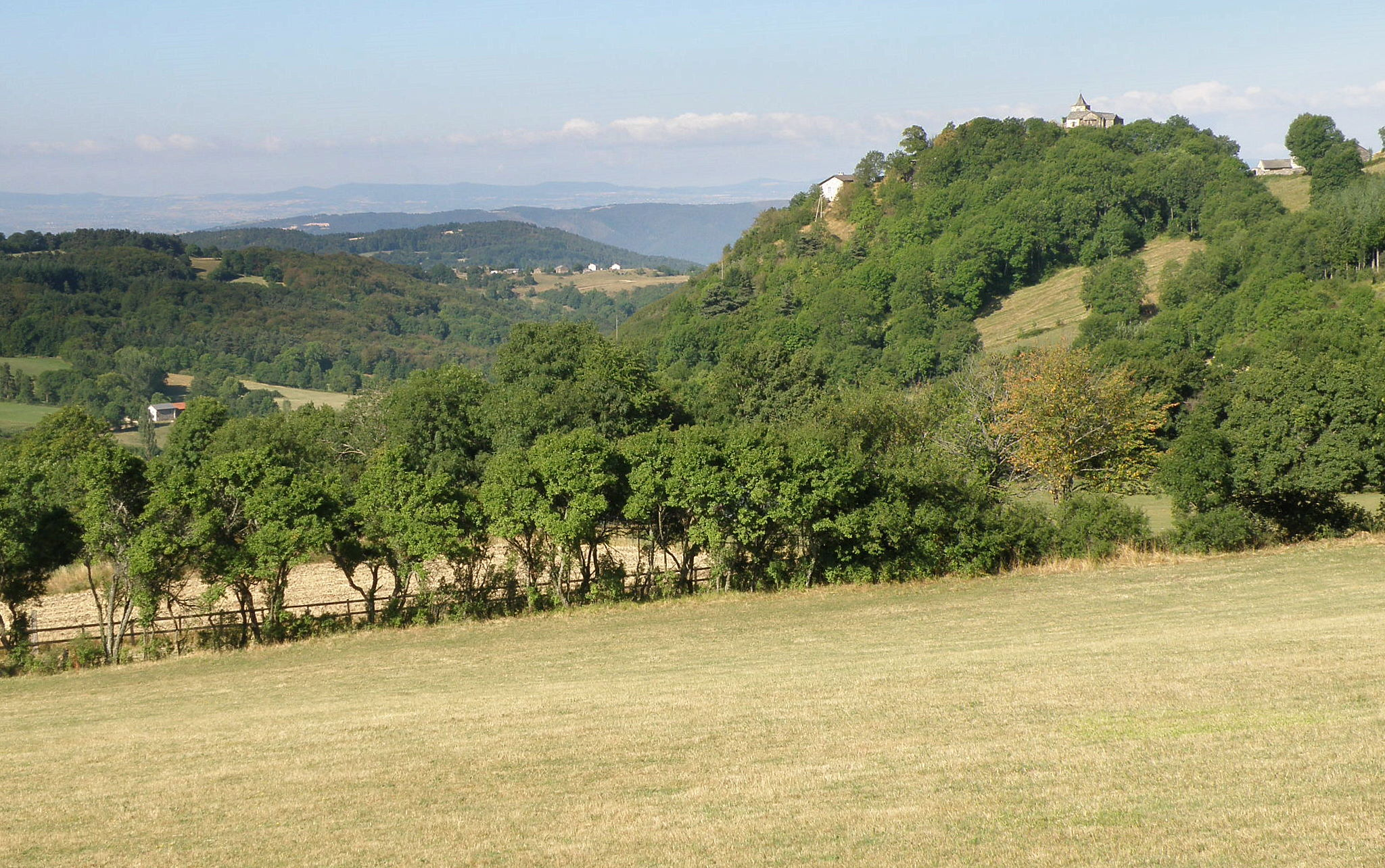
- The Chapel of Glavenas, on the hill to the right
- Location of Saint-Julien-du-Pinet
- Location within France Location within Auvergne-Rhône-Alpes
- Coordinates: 45°09′10″N 4°02′24″E
- Country: France
- Region: Auvergne-Rhône-Alpes
- Department: Haute-Loire
- Arrondissement: Yssingeaux
- Canton: Yssingeaux
- Intercommunality: CC des Sucs

Government
  - Mayor (2021–2026): Christian Gibert
- Area^{1}: 17.2 km^{2} (6.6 sq mi)
- Highest elevation: 1,186 m (3,891 ft)
- Lowest elevation: 637 m (2,090 ft)
- Population (2023): 481
  - Density: 28.0/km^{2} (72.4/sq mi)
- Time zone: UTC+01:00 (CET)
  - Summer (DST): UTC+02:00 (CEST)
- INSEE/Postal code: 43203 /43200
- ^{1} French Land Register data, which excludes lakes, ponds, glaciers > 1 km^{2} (0.386 sq mi or 247 acres) and river estuaries.

Saint-Julien-du-Pinet (French pronunciation: [sɛ̃ ʒyljɛ̃ dy pinɛ]; Occitan: Sant Julian lo Pinet) is a commune in the Haute-Loire department in south-central France.

== Population ==
Historical population
Year	Pop.	±% p.a.
1968	437	—
1975	336	−3.68%
1982	301	−1.56%
1990	301	+0.00%
1999	345	+1.53%
2007	433	+2.88%
2012	452	+0.86%
2017	471	+0.83%
2023	481	+0.35%
Source: INSEE

== See also ==
- Communes of the Haute-Loire department
