= Le Mas-de-Tence =

- Commune
- Location of Le Mas-de-Tence
- Location within France Location within Auvergne-Rhône-Alpes
- Coordinates: 45°07′21″N 4°21′35″E
- Country: France
- Region: Auvergne-Rhône-Alpes
- Department: Haute-Loire
- Arrondissement: Yssingeaux
- Canton: Boutières

Government
  - Mayor (2020–2026): Olivier Broussard
- Area^{1}: 12.83 km^{2} (4.95 sq mi)
- Elevation: 980 m (3,220 ft)
- Highest elevation: 1,153 m (3,783 ft)
- Lowest elevation: 936 m (3,071 ft)
- Population (2023): 167
  - Density: 13.0/km^{2} (33.7/sq mi)
- Time zone: UTC+01:00 (CET)
  - Summer (DST): UTC+02:00 (CEST)
- INSEE/Postal code: 43129 /43190
- ^{1} French Land Register data, which excludes lakes, ponds, glaciers > 1 km^{2} (0.386 sq mi or 247 acres) and river estuaries.

Le Mas-de-Tence (French pronunciation: [lə ma(s) də tɑ̃s]; Occitan: Lo Mas de Tença) is a commune in the Haute-Loire department in south-central France.

== Population ==
Historical population
Year	Pop.	±% p.a.
1968	229	—
1975	217	−0.77%
1982	175	−3.03%
1990	149	−1.99%
1999	150	+0.07%
2007	167	+1.35%
2012	182	+1.74%
2017	168	−1.59%
2023	167	−0.10%
Source: INSEE

== See also ==
- Communes of the Haute-Loire department
