= Riotord =

- Commune
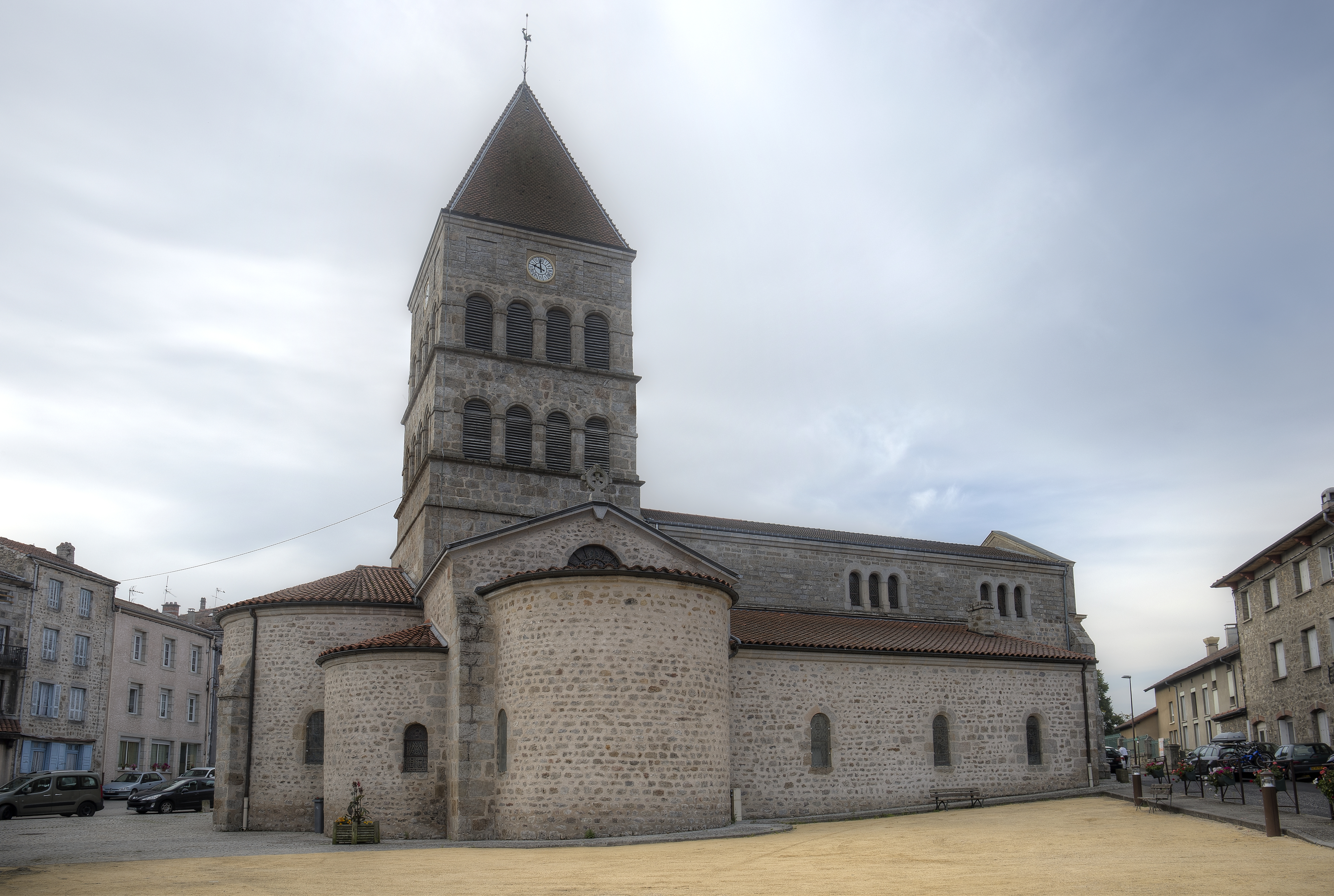
- Location of Riotord
- Location within France Location within Auvergne-Rhône-Alpes
- Coordinates: 45°13′57″N 4°24′10″E
- Country: France
- Region: Auvergne-Rhône-Alpes
- Department: Haute-Loire
- Arrondissement: Yssingeaux
- Canton: Boutières

Government
  - Mayor (2020–2026): Guy Peyrard
- Area^{1}: 51.88 km^{2} (20.03 sq mi)
- Elevation: 864 m (2,835 ft)
- Highest elevation: 1,369 m (4,491 ft)
- Lowest elevation: 791 m (2,595 ft)
- Population (2023): 1,195
  - Density: 23.03/km^{2} (59.66/sq mi)
- Time zone: UTC+01:00 (CET)
  - Summer (DST): UTC+02:00 (CEST)
- INSEE/Postal code: 43163 /43220
- ^{1} French Land Register data, which excludes lakes, ponds, glaciers > 1 km^{2} (0.386 sq mi or 247 acres) and river estuaries.

Riotord (French pronunciation: [ʁjɔtɔʁ]; Occitan: Riutòrt) is a commune in the Haute-Loire department in south-central France.

== Population ==
Historical population
Year	Pop.	±% p.a.
1968	1,513	—
1975	1,404	−1.06%
1982	1,330	−0.77%
1990	1,228	−0.99%
1999	1,155	−0.68%
2007	1,162	+0.08%
2012	1,189	+0.46%
2017	1,174	−0.25%
2023	1,195	+0.30%
Source: INSEE

== Sights ==
- Arboretum de l'Hermet
- SolArtParc

== See also ==
- Communes of the Haute-Loire department
