= Saint-Romain-Lachalm =

- Commune
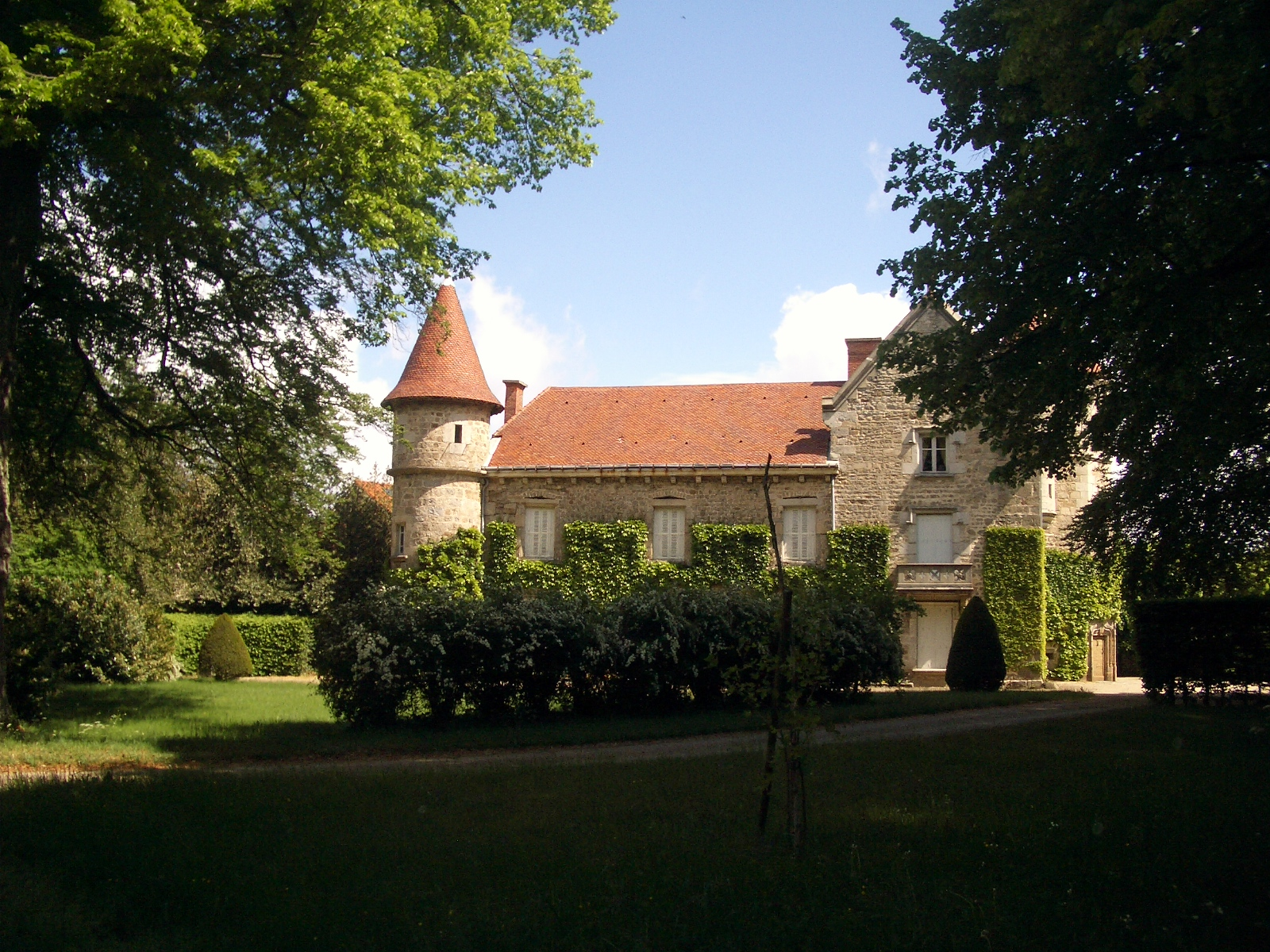
- Château de Saint-Romain
- Location of Saint-Romain-Lachalm
- Location within France Location within Auvergne-Rhône-Alpes
- Coordinates: 45°16′01″N 4°20′06″E
- Country: France
- Region: Auvergne-Rhône-Alpes
- Department: Haute-Loire
- Arrondissement: Yssingeaux
- Canton: Boutières

Government
  - Mayor (2020–2026): Jean-Michel Poinas
- Area^{1}: 19.02 km^{2} (7.34 sq mi)
- Highest elevation: 1,008 m (3,307 ft)
- Lowest elevation: 757 m (2,484 ft)
- Population (2023): 1,154
  - Density: 60.67/km^{2} (157.1/sq mi)
- Time zone: UTC+01:00 (CET)
  - Summer (DST): UTC+02:00 (CEST)
- INSEE/Postal code: 43223 /43620
- ^{1} French Land Register data, which excludes lakes, ponds, glaciers > 1 km^{2} (0.386 sq mi or 247 acres) and river estuaries.

Saint-Romain-Lachalm (French pronunciation: [sɛ̃ ʁɔmɛ̃ laʃalm]; Sant Roman in Occitan) is commune in the Haute-Loire department in south-central France.

The commune's name seems to have come from a visit by Saint Romain, combined with Lachalm referring to the abundance of thatched roofs (la chaum, thatched roof).

== Population ==
Historical population
Year	Pop.	±% p.a.
1968	758	—
1975	644	−2.30%
1982	640	−0.09%
1990	693	+1.00%
1999	831	+2.04%
2007	995	+2.28%
2012	1,073	+1.52%
2017	1,093	+0.37%
2023	1,154	+0.91%
Source: INSEE

== Sights ==
Notable sights include the church, the chateau (privately owned), and the roadside cross. The patron saint's festival is usually the first weekend in August.

== Personalities ==
The noble Du Peloux de Saint Romain family are the counts of Saint-Romain-Lachalm. They came from the Vivarais and St-Romain-Lachalm was part of the dowry of Aymarde de Curnieu in 1418. They restored the chateau in 1603 and added its octagonal tower. When the French Revolution came, Count Charles du Peloux and his son were condemned to death for the simple fact of being of noble lineage. They were finally pardoned thanks to numerous witnesses attesting that they were sympathetic to republican principles (they were supporters of Lafayette). Count Charles was later elected mayor. Of the 22 mayors since, 11 have been from the Du Peloux family.

== See also ==
- Communes of the Haute-Loire department
