= Montfaucon-en-Velay =

- Commune
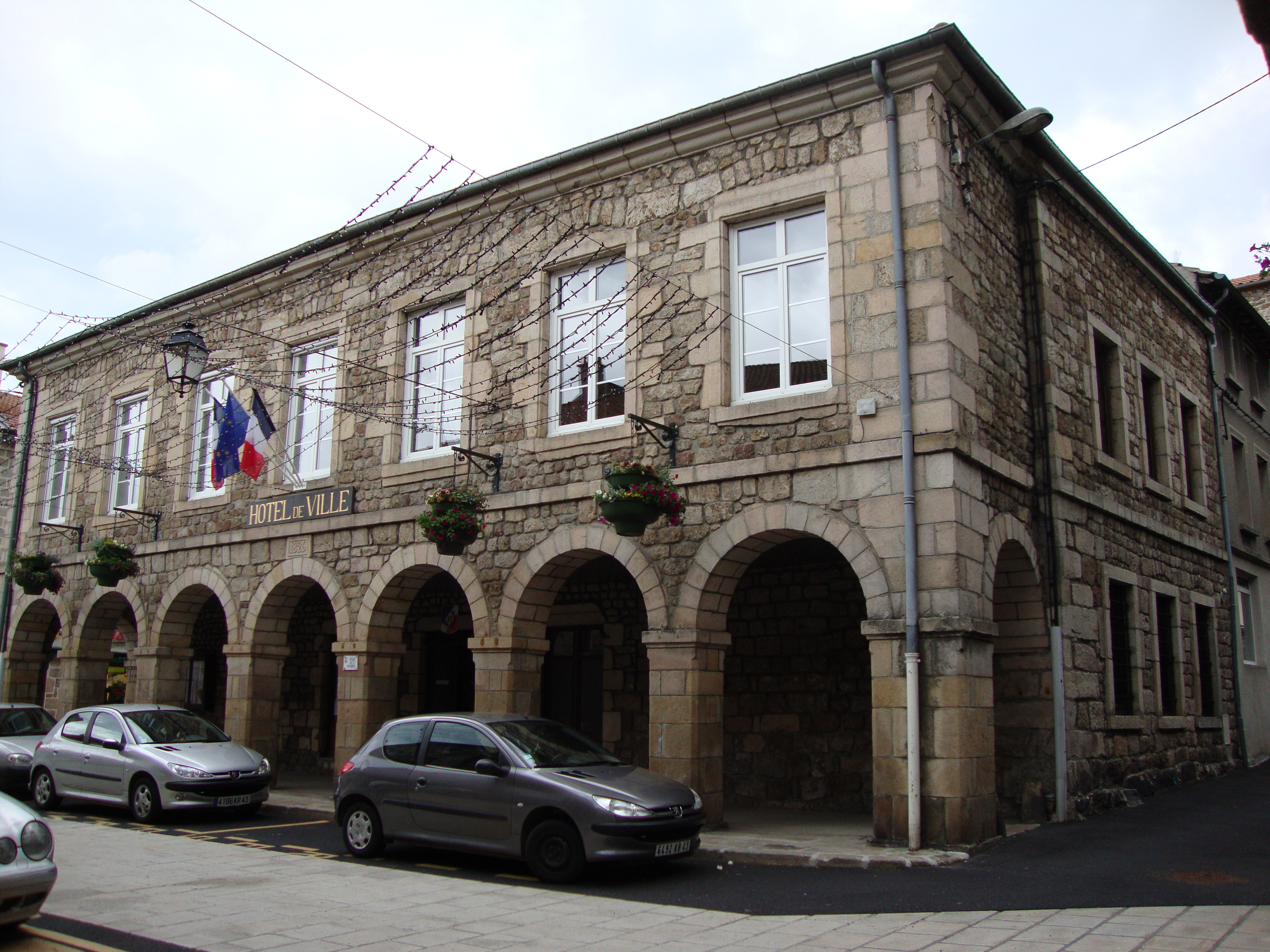
- Town hall

- Coat of arms
- Location of Montfaucon-en-Velay
- Location within France Location within Auvergne-Rhône-Alpes
- Coordinates: 45°11′10″N 4°18′52″E
- Country: France
- Region: Auvergne-Rhône-Alpes
- Department: Haute-Loire
- Arrondissement: Yssingeaux
- Canton: Boutières

Government
  - Mayor (2020–2026): François-Régis Saby
- Area^{1}: 4.99 km^{2} (1.93 sq mi)
- Elevation: 914 m (2,999 ft)
- Highest elevation: 969 m (3,179 ft)
- Lowest elevation: 875 m (2,871 ft)
- Population (2023): 1,158
  - Density: 232/km^{2} (601/sq mi)
- Time zone: UTC+01:00 (CET)
  - Summer (DST): UTC+02:00 (CEST)
- INSEE/Postal code: 43141 /43290
- ^{1} French Land Register data, which excludes lakes, ponds, glaciers > 1 km^{2} (0.386 sq mi or 247 acres) and river estuaries.

Montfaucon-en-Velay (French pronunciation: [mɔ̃fokɔ̃ ɑ̃ vəlɛ], literally Montfaucon in Velay; Occitan: Montfaucon de Velai) is a commune in the Haute-Loire department in south-central France.

The Chapelle Notre-Dame is a 16th century chapel that is located on Rue Notre Dame.

== Population ==
Historical population
Year	Pop.	±% p.a.
1968	1,206	—
1975	1,346	+1.58%
1982	1,352	+0.06%
1990	1,381	+0.27%
1999	1,207	−1.49%
2007	1,185	−0.23%
2012	1,272	+1.43%
2017	1,202	−1.13%
2023	1,158	−0.62%
Source: INSEE

== See also ==
- Communes of the Haute-Loire department
