= Bessamorel =

- Commune
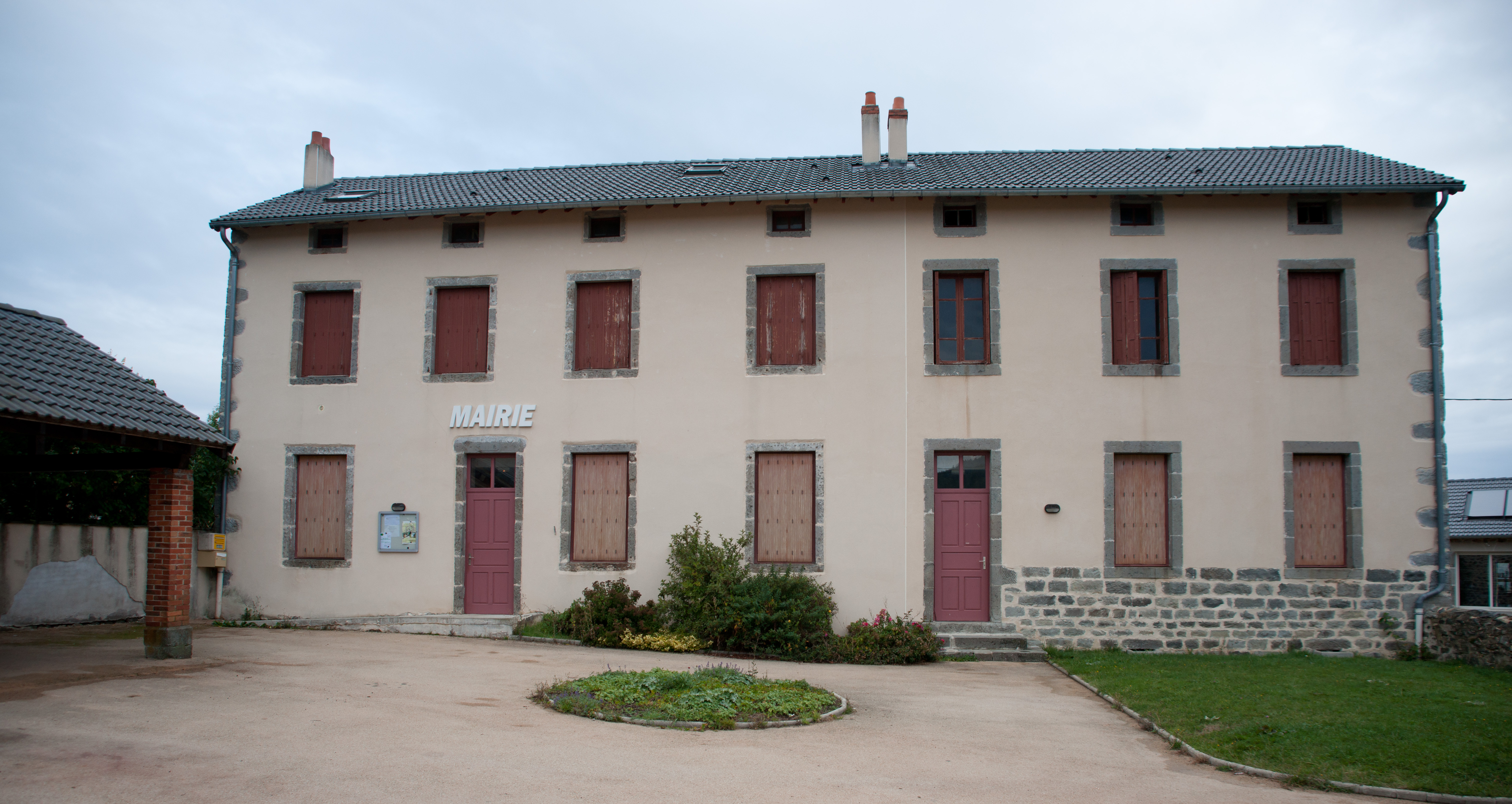
- Town hall
- Location of Bessamorel
- Location within France Location within Auvergne-Rhône-Alpes
- Coordinates: 45°07′18″N 4°05′17″E
- Country: France
- Region: Auvergne-Rhône-Alpes
- Department: Haute-Loire
- Arrondissement: Yssingeaux
- Canton: Yssingeaux

Government
  - Mayor (2020–2026): Éric Dubouchet
- Area^{1}: 7.37 km^{2} (2.85 sq mi)
- Elevation: 930 m (3,050 ft)
- Highest elevation: 1,137 m (3,730 ft)
- Lowest elevation: 760 m (2,490 ft)
- Population (2023): 432
  - Density: 58.6/km^{2} (152/sq mi)
- Time zone: UTC+01:00 (CET)
  - Summer (DST): UTC+02:00 (CEST)
- INSEE/Postal code: 43028 /43200
- ^{1} French Land Register data, which excludes lakes, ponds, glaciers > 1 km^{2} (0.386 sq mi or 247 acres) and river estuaries.

Bessamorel (French pronunciation: [bɛsamɔʁɛl]) is a commune in the Haute-Loire department in south-central France.

== Population ==
Historical population
Year	Pop.	±% p.a.
1968	239	—
1975	242	+0.18%
1982	262	+1.14%
1990	275	+0.61%
1999	329	+2.01%
2007	401	+2.50%
2012	412	+0.54%
2017	458	+2.14%
2023	432	−0.97%
Source: INSEE

== See also ==
- Communes of the Haute-Loire department
