= Saint-Jeures =

- Commune
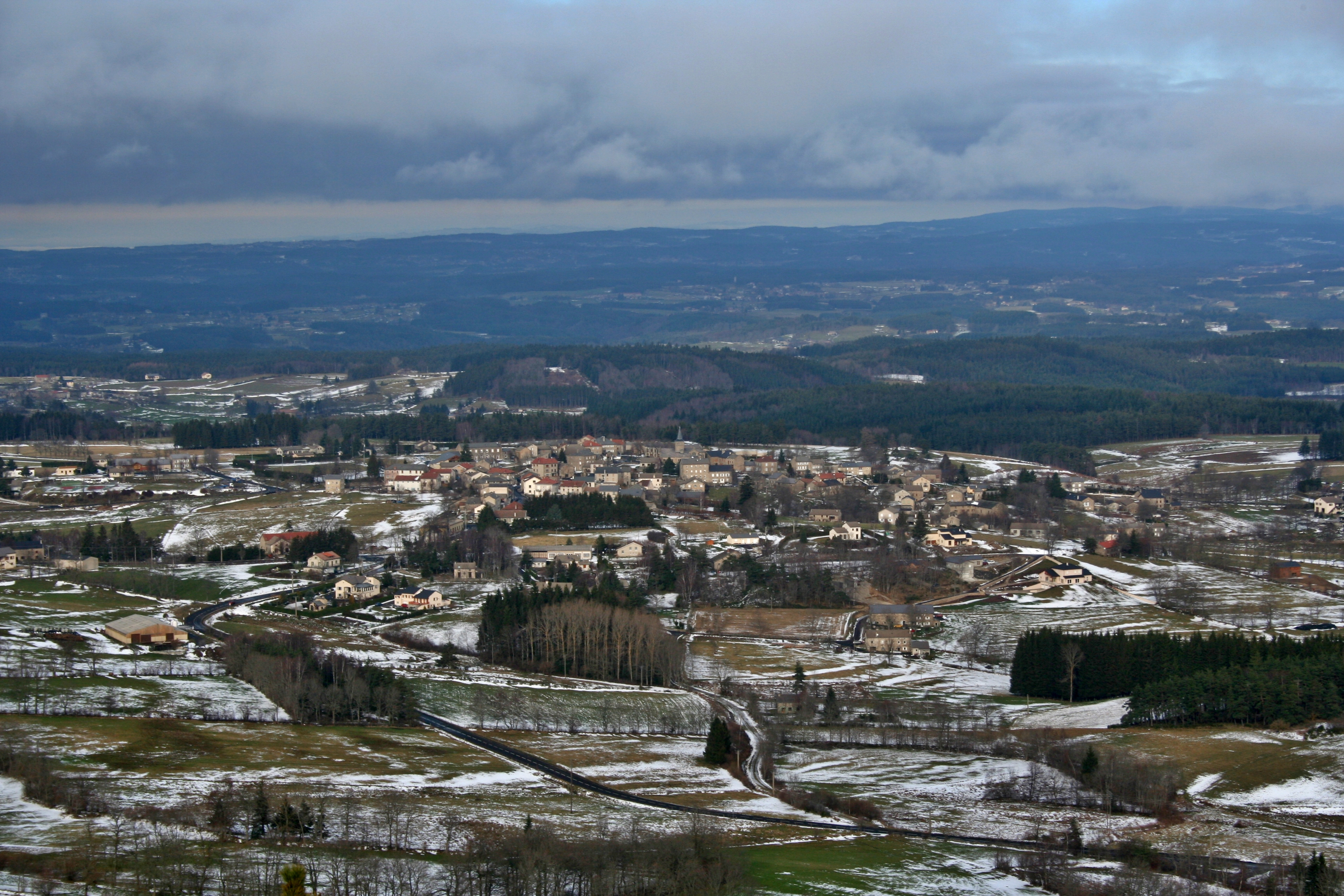
- Saint-Jeures seen from the top of the Suc du Mounier
- Location of Saint-Jeures
- Location within France Location within Auvergne-Rhône-Alpes
- Coordinates: 45°05′49″N 4°12′21″E
- Country: France
- Region: Auvergne-Rhône-Alpes
- Department: Haute-Loire
- Arrondissement: Yssingeaux
- Canton: Boutières
- Intercommunality: Haut-Lignon

Government
  - Mayor (2020–2026): André Duboeuf
- Area^{1}: 34.14 km^{2} (13.18 sq mi)
- Elevation: 1,040 m (3,410 ft)
- Highest elevation: 1,208 m (3,963 ft)
- Lowest elevation: 749 m (2,457 ft)
- Population (2023): 1,015
  - Density: 29.73/km^{2} (77.00/sq mi)
- Time zone: UTC+01:00 (CET)
  - Summer (DST): UTC+02:00 (CEST)
- INSEE/Postal code: 43199 /43200
- ^{1} French Land Register data, which excludes lakes, ponds, glaciers > 1 km^{2} (0.386 sq mi or 247 acres) and river estuaries.

Saint-Jeures (French pronunciation: [sɛ̃ ʒœʁ]; Occitan: Sant Gèire) is a commune in the Haute-Loire department in south-central France. It is around 40 km southwest of Saint-Étienne.

== Geography ==
The river Lignon du Velay flows through the commune.

== Population ==
Historical population
| Year | Pop. | ±% p.a. |
|---|---|---|
| 1968 | 1,059 | — |
| 1975 | 917 | −2.04% |
| 1982 | 775 | −2.37% |
| 1990 | 767 | −0.13% |
| 1999 | 782 | +0.22% |
| 2007 | 875 | +1.41% |
| 2012 | 937 | +1.38% |
| 2017 | 964 | +0.57% |
| 2023 | 1,015 | +0.86% |
Source: INSEE

== Personalities ==
- Joseph Bonet de Treyches, politician during the French Revolution, was born here on 28 March 1757.
- Philippe Vocanson, the oldest man in France (for 16 months) and in Europe (for 4 months), was born here on 20 October 1904. He died in Saint-Étienne on 18 January 2015 aged 110.

== See also ==
- Communes of the Haute-Loire department
