= Saint-Julien-Molhesabate =

- Commune
- Coat of arms
- Location of Saint-Julien-Molhesabate
- Location within France Location within Auvergne-Rhône-Alpes
- Coordinates: 45°11′13″N 4°25′38″E
- Country: France
- Region: Auvergne-Rhône-Alpes
- Department: Haute-Loire
- Arrondissement: Yssingeaux
- Canton: Boutières

Government
  - Mayor (2020–2026): Gilles Cibert
- Area^{1}: 27.5 km^{2} (10.6 sq mi)
- Elevation: 1,035 m (3,396 ft)
- Highest elevation: 1,388 m (4,554 ft)
- Lowest elevation: 809 m (2,654 ft)
- Population (2023): 162
  - Density: 5.89/km^{2} (15.3/sq mi)
- Time zone: UTC+01:00 (CET)
  - Summer (DST): UTC+02:00 (CEST)
- INSEE/Postal code: 43204 /43220
- ^{1} French Land Register data, which excludes lakes, ponds, glaciers > 1 km^{2} (0.386 sq mi or 247 acres) and river estuaries.

Saint-Julien-Molhesabate (French pronunciation: [sɛ̃ ʒyljɛ̃ mɔlesabat]; Occitan: Sant Julian Molhasabata) is a commune in the Haute-Loire department in south-central France.

== Population ==
Historical population
Year	Pop.	±% p.a.
1968	358	—
1975	302	−2.40%
1982	254	−2.44%
1990	253	−0.05%
1999	196	−2.80%
2007	206	+0.62%
2012	189	−1.71%
2017	176	−1.42%
2023	162	−1.37%
Source: INSEE

== See also ==
- Communes of the Haute-Loire department
