= Jardin Botanique Montagnard =

Botanical garden in Auvergne, France

Coordinates: 45.0483°N 4.2466°E

The Jardin botanique montagnard (2 hectares), also known as the Jardin botanique du Mazet-Saint-Voy, is a municipal botanical garden located in Mazet-Saint-Voy, Haute-Loire, Auvergne, France. The garden was established in 1987, and now contains about 450 regionally threatened plant species, as well as 6 additional species protected in the Haute-Loire and 8 species listed nationally for protection.

== See also ==
- List of botanical gardens in France
