= Canton of Yssingeaux =

Coordinates: 45.14°N 4.12°E

The canton of Yssingeaux is an administrative division of the Haute-Loire department, south-central France. Its borders were not modified at the French canton reorganisation which came into effect in March 2015. Its seat is in Yssingeaux.

It consists of the following communes:

1. Araules
2. Beaux
3. Bessamorel
4. Grazac
5. Lapte
6. Saint-Julien-du-Pinet
7. Yssingeaux
