= Arboretum de l'Hermet =

Arboretum in France

Coordinates: 45.23°N 4.4°E

The Arboretum de l'Hermet is an arboretum located at an altitude of 1000 metres, about 6 km east of Riotord, Haute-Loire, Auvergne, France. The arboretum was established in 1998 and contains introduced species such as giant sequoias, American red oak, Japanese larch, spruce, and fir.

== See also ==
- List of botanical gardens in France
