= Mazet-Saint-Voy =

- Commune
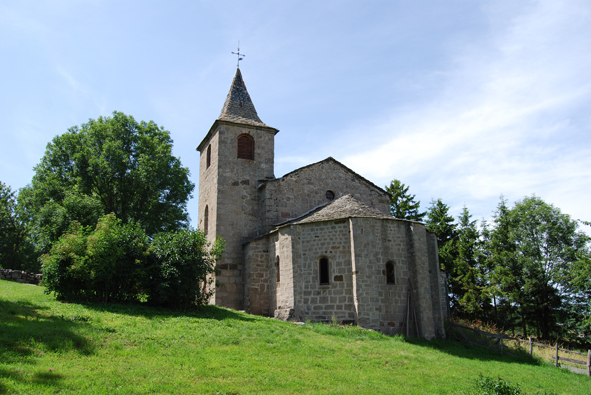
- Location of Mazet-Saint-Voy
- Location within France Location within Auvergne-Rhône-Alpes
- Coordinates: 45°02′52″N 4°14′42″E
- Country: France
- Region: Auvergne-Rhône-Alpes
- Department: Haute-Loire
- Arrondissement: Yssingeaux
- Canton: Mézenc

Government
  - Mayor (2020–2026): Alain Debard
- Area^{1}: 45.02 km^{2} (17.38 sq mi)
- Elevation: 1,040 m (3,410 ft)
- Highest elevation: 1,283 m (4,209 ft)
- Lowest elevation: 875 m (2,871 ft)
- Population (2023): 1,114
  - Density: 24.74/km^{2} (64.09/sq mi)
- Time zone: UTC+01:00 (CET)
  - Summer (DST): UTC+02:00 (CEST)
- INSEE/Postal code: 43130 /43520
- ^{1} French Land Register data, which excludes lakes, ponds, glaciers > 1 km^{2} (0.386 sq mi or 247 acres) and river estuaries.

Mazet-Saint-Voy (French pronunciation: [mazɛ sɛ̃ vwa]; Occitan: Maset de Sent Vòi) is a commune in the Haute-Loire department in south-central France.

== Geography ==
The river Lignon du Velay flows through the commune.

== Population ==
Historical population
| Year | Pop. | ±% p.a. |
|---|---|---|
| 1968 | 1,514 | — |
| 1975 | 1,280 | −2.37% |
| 1982 | 1,106 | −2.07% |
| 1990 | 1,077 | −0.33% |
| 1999 | 1,028 | −0.52% |
| 2007 | 1,072 | +0.53% |
| 2012 | 1,150 | +1.41% |
| 2017 | 1,109 | −0.72% |
| 2023 | 1,114 | +0.08% |
Source: INSEE

== Sights ==
- Jardin botanique montagnard

== See also ==
- Communes of the Haute-Loire department
