= Lignon du Velay =

River in central France

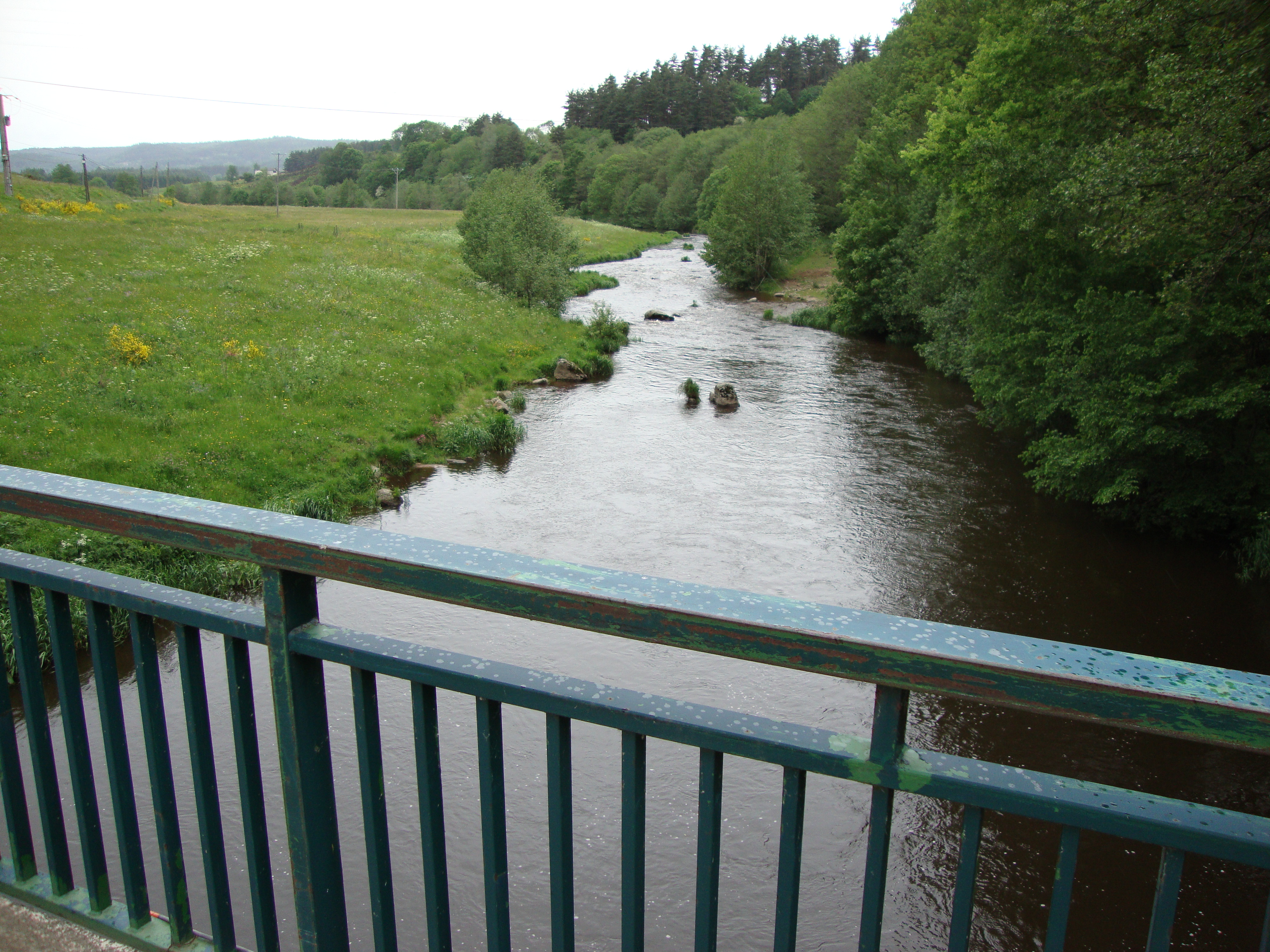

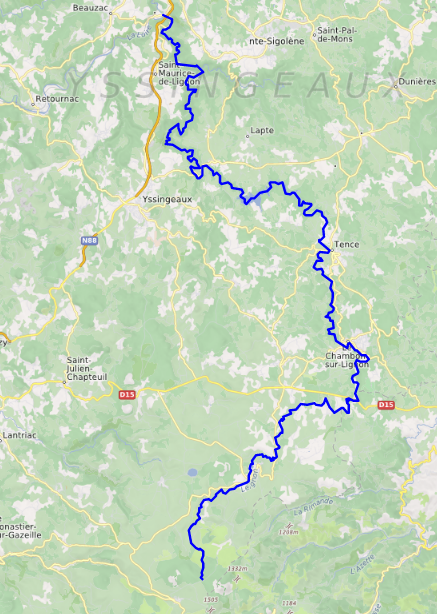

Location
- Country: France

Physical characteristics
- Source
  - location: Chaudeyrolles
  - coordinates: 44°55′23″N 04°10′42″E
  - elevation: 1,440 m (4,720 ft)
- Mouth
  - location: Loire
  - coordinates: 45°15′31″N 04°08′42″E
  - elevation: 460 m (1,510 ft)
- Length: 85.1 km (52.9 mi)
- Basin size: 661.3 km^{2} (255.3 sq mi)
- Discharge
  - average: 9.8 m^{3}/s (350 cu ft/s)

Basin features
- Progression: Loire→ Atlantic Ocean

The Lignon du Velay (French pronunciation: [liɲɔ̃ dy vəlɛ], literally Lignon of the Velay) is an 85.1-kilometre (52.9 mi) long river in the Ardèche and Haute-Loire departments, south-central France. Its source is near Chaudeyrolles. It flows generally north. It is a right tributary of the Loire, into which it flows at Pont de Lignon, a hamlet in Monistrol-sur-Loire.

== Departments and communes along its course ==
This list is ordered from source to mouth:

- Haute-Loire: Chaudeyrolles, Saint-Front, Fay-sur-Lignon, Les Vastres, Mazet-Saint-Voy
- Ardèche: Mars
- Haute-Loire: Le Chambon-sur-Lignon, Saint-Jeures, Tence, Chenereilles, Lapte, Yssingeaux, Grazac, Les Villettes, Saint-Maurice-de-Lignon, Monistrol-sur-Loire
