= Les Villettes =

- Commune
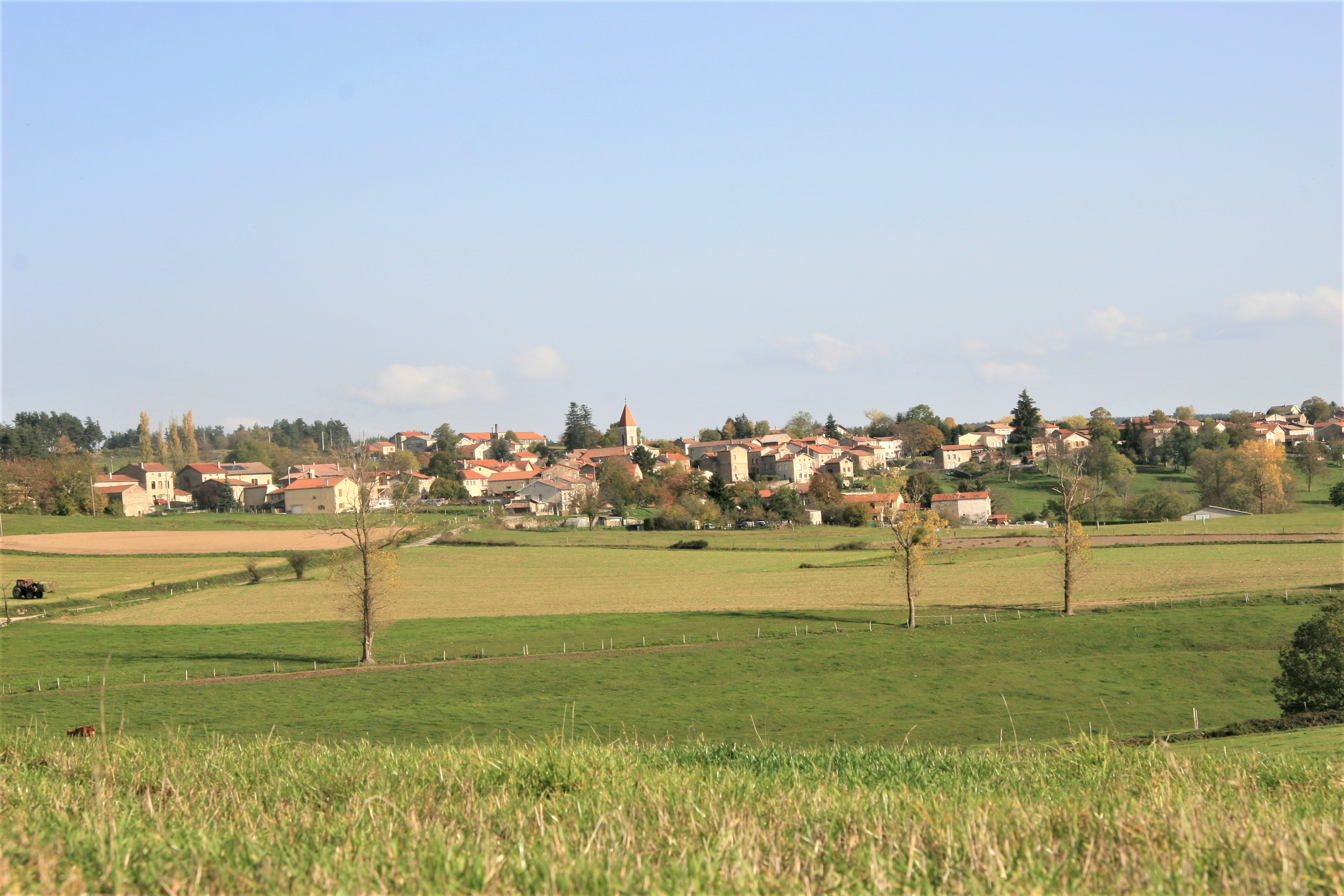
- Location of Les Villettes
- Location within France Location within Auvergne-Rhône-Alpes
- Coordinates: 45°14′09″N 4°11′02″E
- Country: France
- Region: Auvergne-Rhône-Alpes
- Department: Haute-Loire
- Arrondissement: Yssingeaux
- Canton: Monistrol-sur-Loire
- Intercommunality: CC Marches du Velay-Rochebaron

Government
  - Mayor (2020–2026): Marc Treveys
- Area^{1}: 11.78 km^{2} (4.55 sq mi)
- Elevation: 736 m (2,415 ft)
- Highest elevation: 794 m (2,605 ft)
- Lowest elevation: 505 m (1,657 ft)
- Population (2023): 1,450
  - Density: 123/km^{2} (319/sq mi)
- Time zone: UTC+01:00 (CET)
  - Summer (DST): UTC+02:00 (CEST)
- INSEE/Postal code: 43265 /43600
- ^{1} French Land Register data, which excludes lakes, ponds, glaciers > 1 km^{2} (0.386 sq mi or 247 acres) and river estuaries.

Les Villettes (French pronunciation: [le vilɛt]; Occitan: Las Vialetas) is a commune in the Haute-Loire department in south-central France.

== Geography ==
The Lignon du Velay forms the commune's southwestern border.

== Politics and administration ==
=== List of mayors ===
List of successive mayors of Les Villettes
In office		Name	Party	Capacity	Ref.
June 1995	2020	Louis Simonnet	DVG	President of the CC Marches du Velay-Rochebaron (2017-2020)	
2020	Incumbent	Marc Treveys			

== Population ==
Historical population
Year	Pop.	±% p.a.
1968	511	—
1975	423	−2.66%
1982	529	+3.25%
1990	592	+1.42%
1999	851	+4.11%
2007	1,125	+3.55%
2012	1,239	+1.95%
2017	1,423	+2.81%
2023	1,450	+0.31%
Source: INSEE

== See also ==
- Communes of the Haute-Loire department
