= La Chapelle-d'Aurec =

- Commune
- Location of La Chapelle-d'Aurec
- Location within France Location within Auvergne-Rhône-Alpes
- Coordinates: 45°20′10″N 4°12′27″E
- Country: France
- Region: Auvergne-Rhône-Alpes
- Department: Haute-Loire
- Arrondissement: Yssingeaux
- Canton: Monistrol-sur-Loire

Government
  - Mayor (2020–2026): Caroline Di Vincenzo
- Area^{1}: 11.79 km^{2} (4.55 sq mi)
- Elevation: 650 m (2,130 ft)
- Highest elevation: 796 m (2,612 ft)
- Lowest elevation: 422 m (1,385 ft)
- Population (2023): 1,115
  - Density: 94.57/km^{2} (244.9/sq mi)
- Time zone: UTC+01:00 (CET)
  - Summer (DST): UTC+02:00 (CEST)
- INSEE/Postal code: 43058 /43120
- ^{1} French Land Register data, which excludes lakes, ponds, glaciers > 1 km^{2} (0.386 sq mi or 247 acres) and river estuaries.

La Chapelle-d'Aurec (French pronunciation: [la ʃapɛl doʁɛk]; Occitan: La Chapèla d'Aurec) is a commune in the Haute-Loire department in south-central France.

== Population ==
Historical population
Year	Pop.	±% p.a.
1968	243	—
1975	252	+0.52%
1982	311	+3.05%
1990	406	+3.39%
1999	626	+4.93%
2007	803	+3.16%
2012	920	+2.76%
2017	1,019	+2.07%
2023	1,115	+1.51%
Source: INSEE

== See also ==
- Communes of the Haute-Loire department
