= Monistrol-sur-Loire =

- Commune
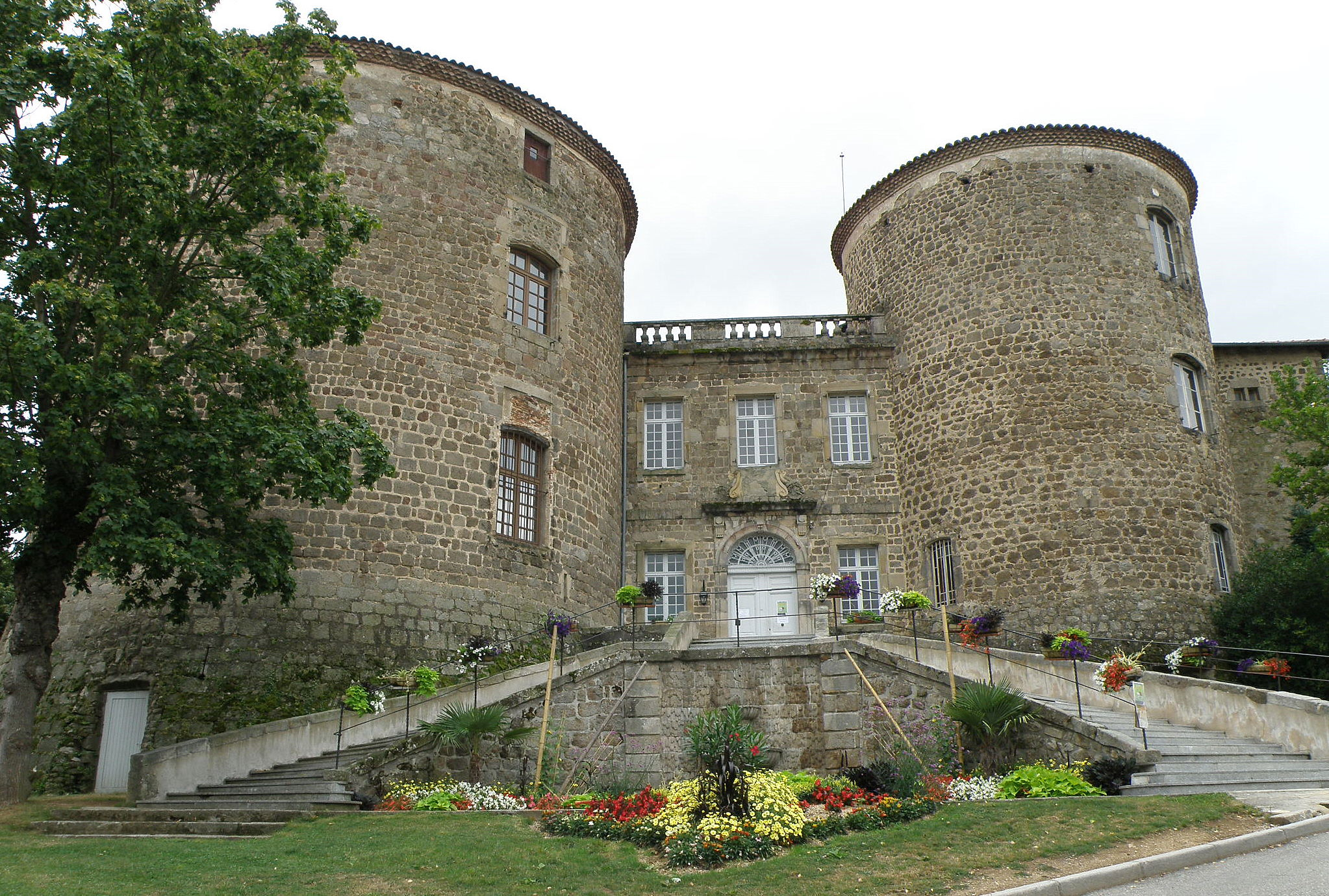
- Château des Évêques

- Coat of arms
- Location of Monistrol-sur-Loire
- Location within France Location within Auvergne-Rhône-Alpes
- Coordinates: 45°17′36″N 4°10′22″E
- Country: France
- Region: Auvergne-Rhône-Alpes
- Department: Haute-Loire
- Arrondissement: Yssingeaux
- Canton: Monistrol-sur-Loire

Government
  - Mayor (2020–2026): Jean-Paul Lyonnet
- Area^{1}: 48.25 km^{2} (18.63 sq mi)
- Highest elevation: 874 m (2,867 ft)
- Lowest elevation: 434 m (1,424 ft)
- Population (2023): 8,823
  - Density: 182.9/km^{2} (473.6/sq mi)
- Time zone: UTC+01:00 (CET)
  - Summer (DST): UTC+02:00 (CEST)
- INSEE/Postal code: 43137 /43120
- ^{1} French Land Register data, which excludes lakes, ponds, glaciers > 1 km^{2} (0.386 sq mi or 247 acres) and river estuaries.

Monistrol-sur-Loire is a commune in the Haute-Loire department in south-central France.

== Geography ==
The river Lignon du Velay flows into the Loire in the commune.

== Population ==
Historical population

Year	Pop.	±% p.a.
1793	3,923	—
1800	3,913	−0.04%
1806	4,048	+0.57%
1821	3,930	−0.20%
1831	4,145	+0.53%
1836	3,825	−1.59%
1841	3,975	+0.77%
1846	4,431	+2.20%
1851	4,619	+0.83%
1856	4,752	+0.57%
1861	4,473	−1.20%
1866	4,781	+1.34%
1872	4,452	−1.18%
1876	4,722	+1.48%
1881	4,703	−0.08%
1886	4,850	+0.62%
1891	4,719	−0.55%
1896	4,918	+0.83%
1901	4,931	+0.05%

Year	Pop.	±% p.a.
1906	5,087	+0.62%
1911	5,008	−0.31%
1921	4,481	−1.11%
1926	4,487	+0.03%
1931	4,305	−0.82%
1936	4,116	−0.89%
1946	3,829	−0.72%
1954	4,063	+0.74%
1962	4,020	−0.13%
1968	4,265	+0.99%
1975	4,607	+1.11%
1982	5,143	+1.58%
1990	6,180	+2.32%
1999	7,451	+2.10%
2007	8,582	+1.78%
2012	8,789	+0.48%
2017	8,718	−0.16%
2023	8,823	+0.20%

Source: EHESS and INSEE (1968-2023)

== Personalities ==
- Roman Catholic archbishop Armand-François-Marie de Charbonnel

== See also ==
- Communes of the Haute-Loire department
