= Montregard =

- Commune
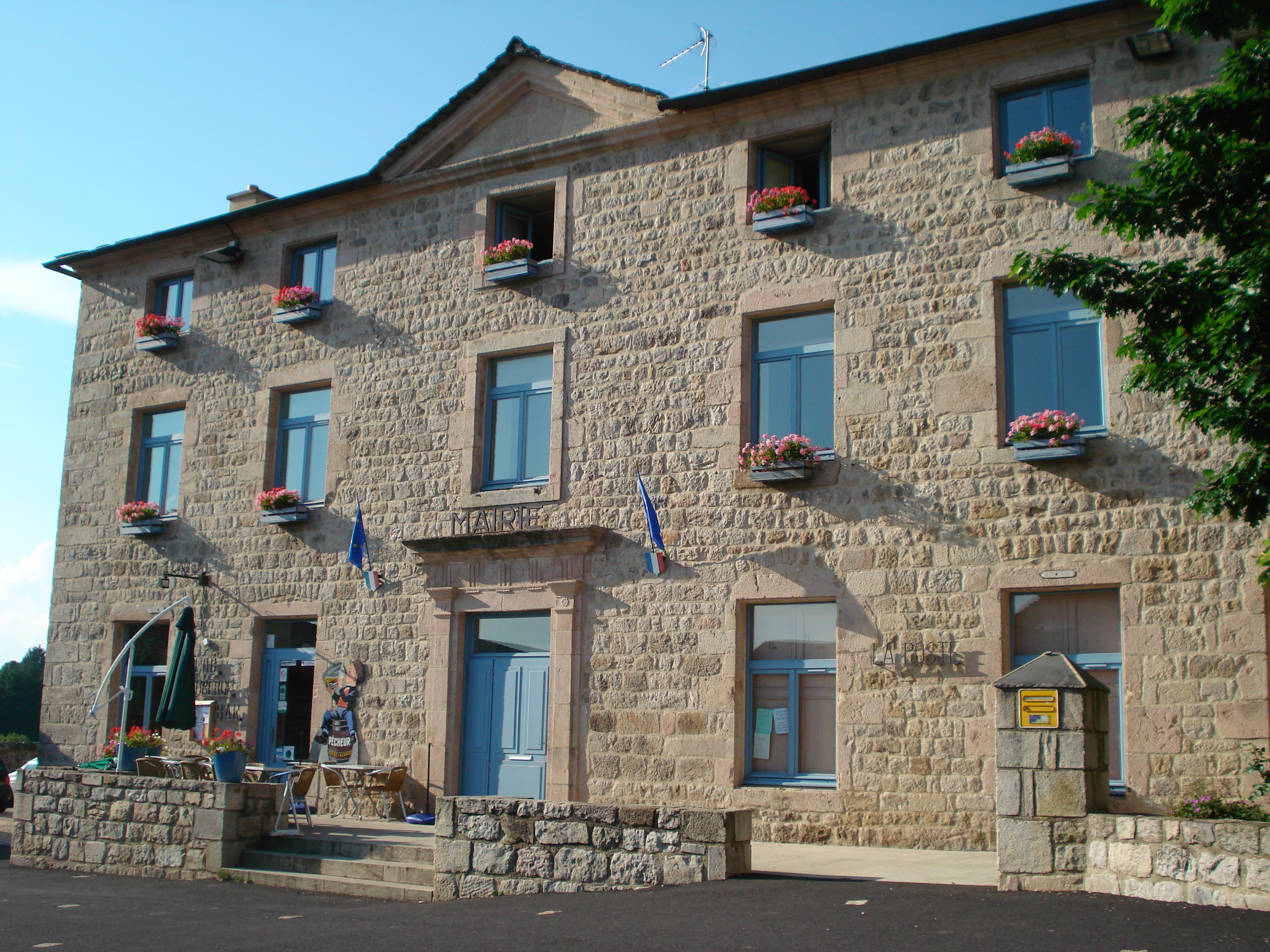
- Town hall
- Location of Montregard
- Location within France Location within Auvergne-Rhône-Alpes
- Coordinates: 45°09′33″N 4°20′50″E
- Country: France
- Region: Auvergne-Rhône-Alpes
- Department: Haute-Loire
- Arrondissement: Yssingeaux
- Canton: Boutières

Government
  - Mayor (2020–2026): Gilles Jury
- Area^{1}: 39.93 km^{2} (15.42 sq mi)
- Elevation: 1,035 m (3,396 ft)
- Highest elevation: 1,142 m (3,747 ft)
- Lowest elevation: 859 m (2,818 ft)
- Population (2023): 629
  - Density: 15.8/km^{2} (40.8/sq mi)
- Time zone: UTC+01:00 (CET)
  - Summer (DST): UTC+02:00 (CEST)
- INSEE/Postal code: 43142 /43290
- ^{1} French Land Register data, which excludes lakes, ponds, glaciers > 1 km^{2} (0.386 sq mi or 247 acres) and river estuaries.

Montregard (French pronunciation: [mɔ̃ʁəɡaʁ]) is a commune in the Haute-Loire department in south-central France.

== Population ==
Historical population
Year	Pop.	±% p.a.
1968	841	—
1975	696	−2.67%
1982	599	−2.12%
1990	581	−0.38%
1999	594	+0.25%
2007	612	+0.37%
2012	605	−0.23%
2017	596	−0.30%
2023	629	+0.90%
Source: INSEE

== See also ==
- Communes of the Haute-Loire department
