= Grazac, Haute-Loire =

Grazac
- Commune
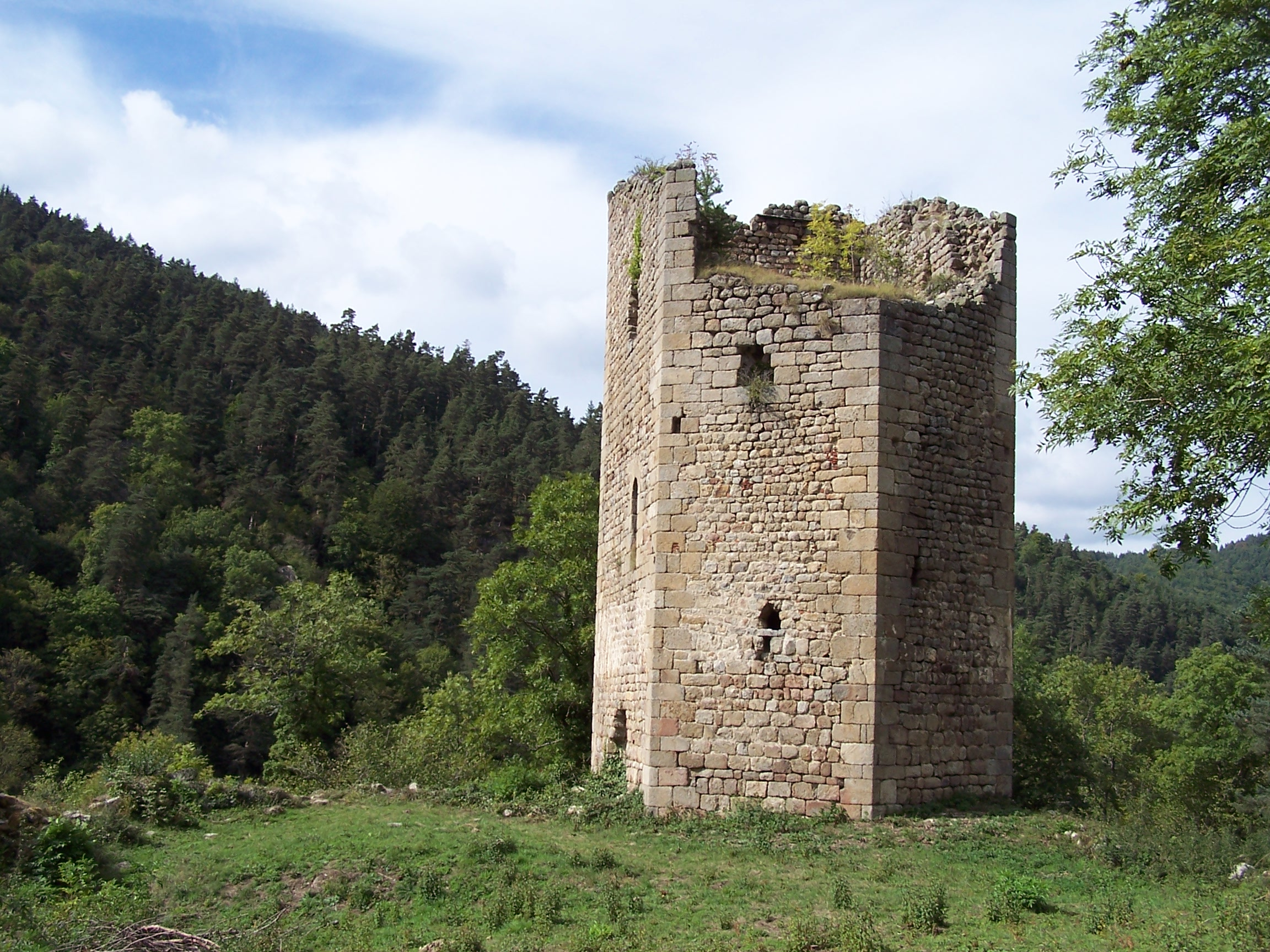
- Tower at the Chateau de Carry
- Location of Grazac
- Location within France Location within Auvergne-Rhône-Alpes
- Coordinates: 45°11′18″N 4°11′02″E
- Country: France
- Region: Auvergne-Rhône-Alpes
- Department: Haute-Loire
- Arrondissement: Yssingeaux
- Canton: Yssingeaux

Government
  - Mayor (2020–2026): Hervé Gaillard
- Area^{1}: 21.66 km^{2} (8.36 sq mi)
- Elevation: 793 m (2,602 ft)
- Highest elevation: 854 m (2,802 ft)
- Lowest elevation: 537 m (1,762 ft)
- Population (2023): 1,152
  - Density: 53.19/km^{2} (137.8/sq mi)
- Time zone: UTC+01:00 (CET)
  - Summer (DST): UTC+02:00 (CEST)
- INSEE/Postal code: 43102 /43200
- ^{1} French Land Register data, which excludes lakes, ponds, glaciers > 1 km^{2} (0.386 sq mi or 247 acres) and river estuaries.

Grazac (French pronunciation: [ɡʁazak]) is a commune in the Haute-Loire department in south-central France.

== Geography ==
The river Lignon du Velay flows through the commune.

== Population ==
Historical population
Year	Pop.	±% p.a.
1968	682	—
1975	627	−1.19%
1982	588	−0.91%
1990	627	+0.81%
1999	728	+1.67%
2007	925	+3.04%
2012	1,034	+2.25%
2017	1,063	+0.55%
2023	1,152	+1.35%
Source: INSEE

== See also ==
- Communes of the Haute-Loire department
