= Monistrol-d'Allier =

- Commune
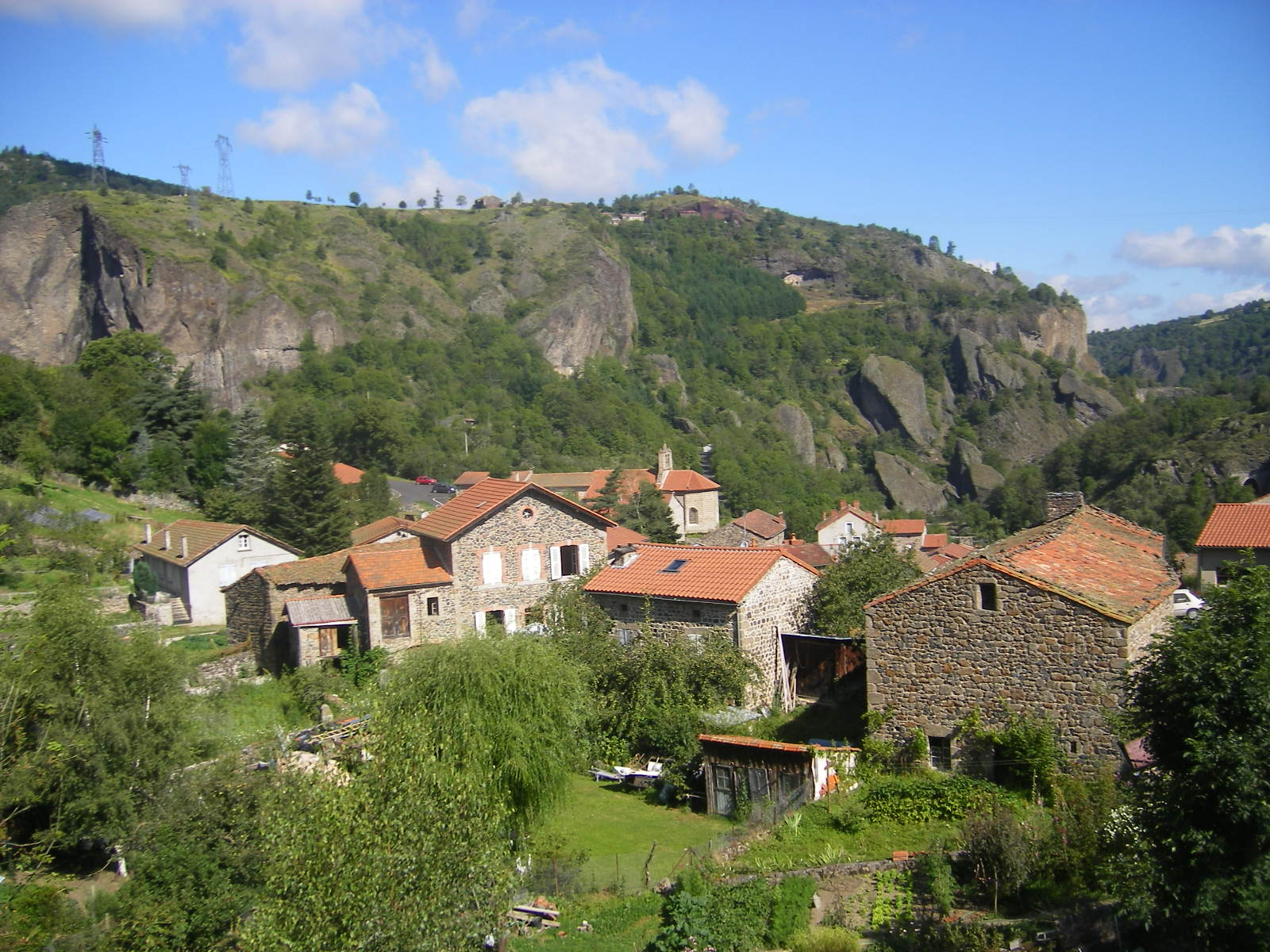

- Coat of arms
- Location of Monistrol-d'Allier
- Location within France Location within Auvergne-Rhône-Alpes
- Coordinates: 44°58′09″N 3°38′39″E
- Country: France
- Region: Auvergne-Rhône-Alpes
- Department: Haute-Loire
- Arrondissement: Brioude
- Canton: Gorges de l'Allier-Gévaudan
- Intercommunality: CA du Puy-en-Velay

Government
  - Mayor (2021–2026): Olivier Depalle
- Area^{1}: 27.32 km^{2} (10.55 sq mi)
- Highest elevation: 1,074 m (3,524 ft)
- Lowest elevation: 551 m (1,808 ft)
- Population (2023): 226
  - Density: 8.27/km^{2} (21.4/sq mi)
- Time zone: UTC+01:00 (CET)
  - Summer (DST): UTC+02:00 (CEST)
- INSEE/Postal code: 43136 /43580
- ^{1} French Land Register data, which excludes lakes, ponds, glaciers > 1 km^{2} (0.386 sq mi or 247 acres) and river estuaries.

Monistrol-d'Allier (French pronunciation: [mɔnistʁɔl dalje], literally Monistrol of Allier; Occitan: Monistròl d'Alèir) is a commune in the Haute-Loire department in south-central France.

== Population ==
Historical population
Year	Pop.	±% p.a.
1968	490	—
1975	395	−3.03%
1982	340	−2.12%
1990	312	−1.07%
1999	256	−2.17%
2007	218	−1.99%
2012	213	−0.46%
2017	202	−1.05%
2023	226	+1.89%
Source: INSEE

== See also ==
- Communes of the Haute-Loire department
