= Chenereilles, Haute-Loire =

Chenereilles
- Commune
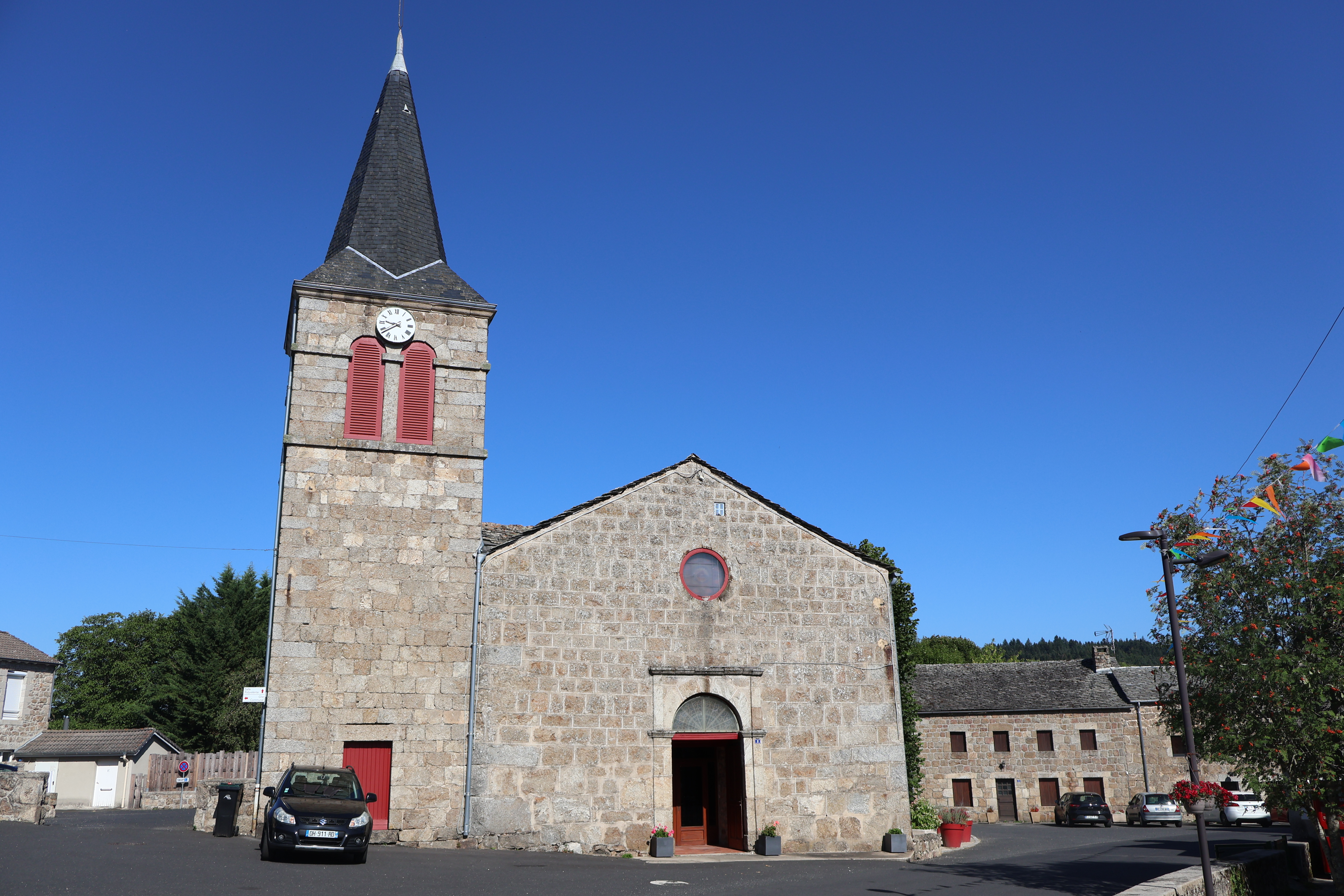
- Church in Chenereilles
- Location of Chenereilles
- Location within France Location within Auvergne-Rhône-Alpes
- Coordinates: 45°08′03″N 4°15′10″E
- Country: France
- Region: Auvergne-Rhône-Alpes
- Department: Haute-Loire
- Arrondissement: Yssingeaux
- Canton: Boutières

Government
  - Mayor (2020–2026): Philippe Digonnet
- Area^{1}: 14.42 km^{2} (5.57 sq mi)
- Elevation: 850 m (2,790 ft)
- Highest elevation: 956 m (3,136 ft)
- Lowest elevation: 806 m (2,644 ft)
- Population (2023): 287
  - Density: 19.9/km^{2} (51.5/sq mi)
- Time zone: UTC+01:00 (CET)
  - Summer (DST): UTC+02:00 (CEST)
- INSEE/Postal code: 43069 /43190
- ^{1} French Land Register data, which excludes lakes, ponds, glaciers > 1 km^{2} (0.386 sq mi or 247 acres) and river estuaries.

Chenereilles (French pronunciation: [ʃənəʁɛj]; Occitan: Chanarelhas) is a commune in the Haute-Loire department in south-central France.

== Geography ==
The river Lignon du Velay flows through the commune.

== Population ==
Historical population
Year	Pop.	±% p.a.
1968	298	—
1975	231	−3.57%
1982	220	−0.69%
1990	217	−0.17%
1999	242	+1.22%
2007	280	+1.84%
2012	315	+2.38%
2017	325	+0.63%
2023	287	−2.05%
Source: INSEE

== See also ==
- Communes of the Haute-Loire department
