= Vellavii =

Gallic tribe

The Vellavii (Ancient Greek: Οὐελλαούιοι, Ou̓ellaoúioi) or Vellavi (Gaulish: *Uellauī) were a Gallic tribe dwelling around the modern city of Le Puy-en-Velay, in the region of the Auvergne, during the Iron Age and the Roman period.

== Name ==
They are mentioned as Vellaviis (var. vellabiis) by Caesar (mid-1st c. BC), Ou̓ellaoúioi (Οὐελλαούιοι, var. -άοιοι, -άϊοι) by Strabo (early 1st c. AD), Vellavi (var. velavi) by Pliny (1st c. AD), Ou̓éllaunoi (Οὐέλλαυνοι, var. Οὐέλλενες) by Ptolemy (2nd c. AD), and as Velavorum in the Notitia Dignitatum (5th c. AD).

Alexander Falileyev derives the name from the Gaulish element uello-. The stem, a geminated form of ualo- ('ruler, prince'), is cognate with Latin valeo ('to be strong').

The city of Le-Puy-en-Velay, attested ca. 400 AD as civitas Villavorum ('civitas of the Vellavi'), and the region of Velay, attested in 845 as pagus Vellaicus ('pagus of the Vellavi', Velhac in the 13th c., Velai in 1335), are named after the Gallic tribe. (Note: The developed form civitas Vellavorum ('community of the Vellavii') appears in inscriptions of the Roman period. It is carried by a series of milestones set up from Saint-Paulien, and by two dedications of the mid-3rd century AD, to Herennia Etruscilla, wife of the emperor Decius, and to Furia Sabinia Tranquillina, wife of Gordian III, in which the community styles itself civitas Vellavorum libera.)

== Geography ==
The territory of the Vellavii lay in the eastern part of the modern department of Haute-Loire, in the region to which they gave their name, the Velay. To the south-west it bordered on the land of the Gabali, the boundary following the watershed of the Margeride near Randon. Their chief town, Ruessium (modern Saint-Paulien), stood on the Roman road from Lugdunum to Burdigala by way of Rodez, between Icidmagus (Usson-en-Forez) and Condate.

Before the conquest the main settlement of the people seems to have been the oppidum of Marcilhac, in the commune of Saint-Paulien, which was abandoned as the urban centre of Ruessium took shape on the plain nearby.

The site of Ruessium was occupied since the late La Tène period. Its urban development began under Augustus and continued under Tiberius, and at its height the town covered some 28 to 30 hectares. Ptolemy gives it as the chief town of the people in the 2nd century AD. The community held the rank of a free civitas (civitas libera), a status that Prévôt links to its earlier position among the Arverni. (Note: The praefectus coloniae is named on the epitaph of the magistrate Nonnius, who appears there also as a gutuater. The title was once read as proof of a Roman colony among the Vellavii. Alain Chastagnol instead saw in it evidence that the civitas had obtained Latin rights (ius Latii), Ruessium then bearing the honorific rank of colony, a grant he set under Claudius or, following Louis Maurin, early in the reign of Tiberius. On this reading the capital was administered by a praefectus coloniae and the whole civitas by duumvirs. Françoise Prévôt likewise treats the title as honorific.) Pliny does not list the Vellavii among the free cities of the province, so the civitas was probably stipendiary at first, governed in the Gaulish manner by a vergobret, a chief magistrate named on the epitaph of Dubnocus, perhaps of the reign of Augustus or Tiberius.

Ruessium declined from the 3rd century AD, without any trace of fire or violent destruction. It was progressively supplanted by Anicium (modern Le Puy-en-Velay), which became the chief town in late antiquity, although the date of the transfer is not known.

== History ==
According to Caesar, the Vellavii were long subject to the Arverni. Strabo describes them as formerly attached to the Arverni but independent in his own day, a change that Françoise Prévôt places under Augustus or Tiberius. The Arverni relied on them to hold the road over the col du Pal (near Camplong?), one of the routes between the Velay and Narbonese Gaul, and the Vellavii had been in direct contact with Rome since the conquest of that province. They seem never to have struck coinage, though several sites in their territory have yielded imported and painted southern-Gaulish wares.

The Vellavii little part in the Gallic War. In the winter of 52 BC Caesar crossed the col du Pal to raid the Arverni. In answer to a Helvian raid the Vellavii, with the Gabali and the Arverni, crossed the pass in turn and won a victory that had no sequel over the neighbouring Helvii. In July they sent a contingent, counted among the 35,000 men levied on the Arverni and their dependants, for the army that tried to relieve Vercingetorix at Alesia.

Epigraphy has yielded the names of twenty-three men and fourteen women datable between the early 1st and the 3rd century AD, seventeen or eighteen of them Roman citizens or the wives of citizens. Local notables held all the civic magistracies of their community, among them Ciltica, named on a stone from Espaly-Saint-Marcel, who was also patron of the fabri tignariorum, the builders' guild. Other magistrates held office in the administration of the iron mines, though perhaps at the Council of the Gauls at Lyon rather than in the territory itself.

== Economy ==
The rural economy rested on farming. Lentils and probably cereals were grown, peaches and cherries are known from their stones, and the herds ran to pigs above all, then sheep and goats, with fewer cattle and fowl. Strainers attest cheese-making, carved reliefs from Ceyssac and Solignac show the gear of the fisherman and the hunter, and others in the cathedral of Le Puy depict scenes of trade. Wood, iron and stone were worked in the territory, arkose was quarried at Blavozy and limestone at Ronzon, and galena, a source of lead and possibly silver, was mined at La Gouise.

== Religion ==
The evidence for the religion of the Vellavii comes almost entirely from Anicium (Le Puy), where blocks reused in the walls of the medieval cathedral preserve inscriptions and carved fragments. Michel Provost and Bernard Rémy take the reused pieces of at least two friezes as remains of a temple dedicated to the forces of nature, and connect the popularity of this sanctuary in the 2nd and 3rd centuries AD with the growth of a vicus at Anicium and the decline of the neighbouring capital. Claire Mitton notes that the architectural fragments attest a monumental building but do not in themselves prove a temple. No cult building of the Roman period has been identified at Ruessium itself.

The lintel of the so-called porte papale carries on one face a later inscription and on the reverse a dedication Adidoni et Augusto set up at his own expense by Sextus Talonius Musicus. It attests a local god, Adido, honoured together with the imperial cult. Sylvie Vilatte reads Adido as a solar and Apollonian deity assimilated to Sol Invictus, the mountain plateau taking its name from the invincible god.

The monumental funerary inscription of the magistrate Nonnius, reused at the cathedral, names him a gutuater, a Celtic priesthood, within a career that also included the office of praefectus coloniae. Françoise Prévôt takes the priesthood as evidence of a sanctuary of native origin at Le Puy, and Bernard Rémy, who links it perhaps to the cult of Mars, reads the word likewise as a title. The term is attested elsewhere in Gaul as a sacerdotal office, notably in the form gutuater Martis at Mâcon. (Note: Françoise Le Roux and Christian-Joseph Guyonvarc'h instead read Gutuater as a personal name, a view neither Prévôt nor Rémy follows. On the Le Puy stone the word forms part of Nonnius's sequence of offices, held with the praefectus coloniae.)

A third inscription, found in the wall of the baptistery of Saint-Jean, bears the letters F D C. Bernard Rémy expands them as f(ulgur) d(ivum) c(onditum), 'the divine lightning has been buried here', marking the spot where lightning had struck as a consecrated and inviolable place. He regards it as the only record of this cult so far found in Aquitania.

Jupiter Optimus Maximus was honoured at Brives-Charensac and Monlet, perhaps under a local form, and Lucius Sergius Primus dedicated to the welfare of the human race, and perhaps to the goddess Salus, at Ruessium. Statuettes found in the territory represent Jupiter or Dis Pater, Jupiter-Serapis, Bacchus, Mercury and Hercules. The imperial cult is attested from the early Empire. Dedications honour the princes Gaius and Lucius Caesar at Ruessium, Tiberius at Monlet and Claudius at Polignac, and later the empresses Herennia Etruscilla and Julia Domna at Ruessium and Furia Sabinia Tranquillina at Lavoûte-sur-Loire. Nonnius Ferox, son of the gutuater Nonnius, held a flaminate, and a priest named on a stone from Sanssac-l'Église may have served at the federal altar of the Three Gauls at Lyon.

Away from Anicium the cult evidence is slight, and the few sanctuaries known in Vellavian territory were all found by excavation. A temple stood at Le Bouchet-Saint-Nicolas, and a sacred spring at the Suc du Bèze, in the commune of Saint-Jean-d'Aubrigoux, received offerings from the 1st to the 3rd century AD, among habitations and resin-workers' workshops that may mark a small settlement. Provost and Rémy list both among the fana of the civitas.
