= Verveine du Velay =

Range of liqueurs

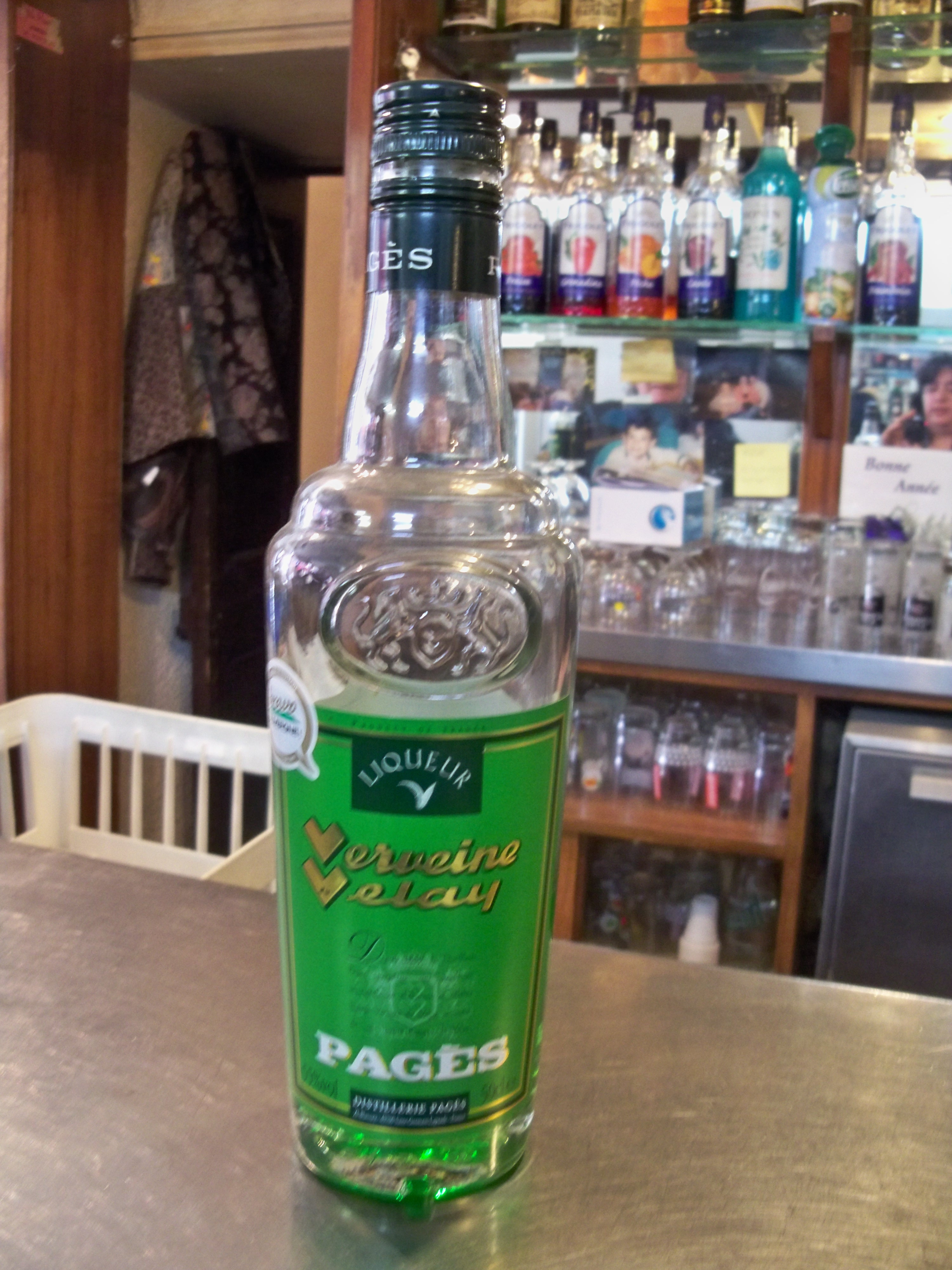

Verveine du Velay is a range of liqueurs created in Le-Puy-en-Velay by the distillery Pagès Védrenne. Their flavour derives from lemon verbena in a melange of thirty-two plants, spices, and aromatic herbs. They are made by macerating these botanicals to form a strongly flavoured green liquor and mixing it with distillate, which is then aged in oak casks.

Verveine is normally taken after a meal as a digestif, but it can also be used in cocktails. Other verbena-based aperitifs and digestives are available in different regions, but Verveine du Velay Pagès is the best known across France and is distributed internationally.

== Origins ==
Verbena (verbena officinalis), also known as common vervain or wild hyssop, has long been associated with divine and other supernatural forces, and it has an equally long-standing use as a medicinal plant.

No plant is as renowned among the Romans as ... verbenaca. ... used by the people of Gaul in fortune-telling and in uttering prophecies ... people who have been rubbed with it obtain their wishes, banish fevers, win friends and cure all diseases without exception ... it must be gathered about the rising of the Dog-star without the action being seen by moon or sun ... if a dining-couch is sprinkled with water in which this plant has been soaked the entertainment becomes merrier. As a remedy for snake bites it is crushed in wine.

— Pliny the Elder, Naturalis Historia

Later, it was hung above a bed to ward off charms and spells and used to make love potions.

In the Auvergne, druids were recorded as calling for “virgins crowned with verbena and foliage gathered at the sixth day of the moon, decorated with mystical rings and skilled in the art of preparing potions” to sit alongside them at their major councils.

== Development ==
The Verveine du Velay Pagès we know today was developed by Joseph Rumillet (1833-1916), from Champagneux, Savoie, who started his career in a distillery in Lyon. Rumillet was an apothecary and herbalist and soon became skilled as a distiller.

Lemon verbena (aloysia citrodora), native to Peru, was introduced in France in 1785, and by the age of 26, Rumillet had developed the concept of a verbena-based liqueur. In Lyon he met his wife, Eulalie Charretier, and in 1859 they moved to his wife's district, the Velay, where he set up a distillery in Espaly-Saint-Marcel. It was here that he perfected the formula for Verveine du Velay in two versions, Verte and Jeaune.

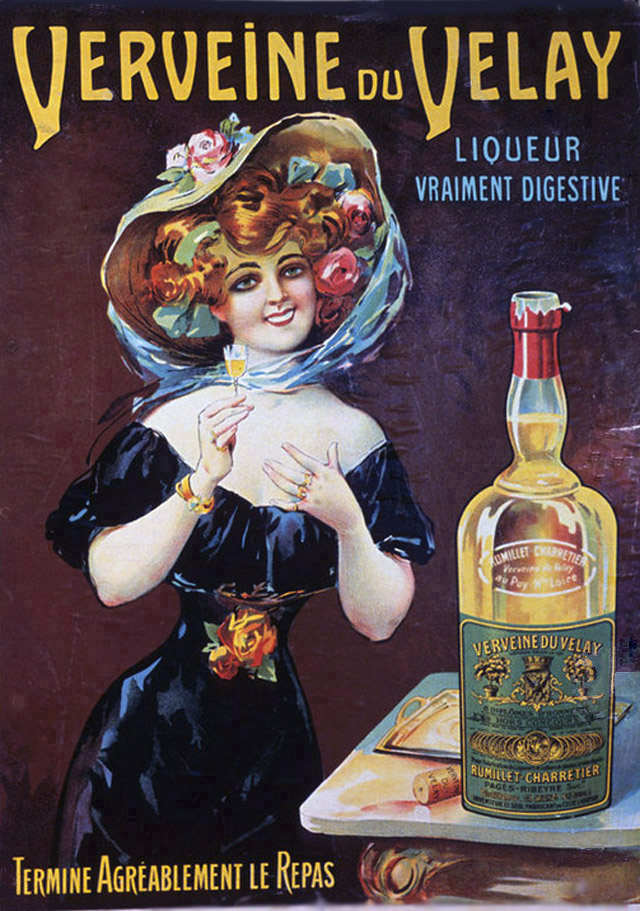
Advertisement for Jeaune Verveine du Velay Rumillet-Charretier.

His success enabled him in 1865 to set up a distillation plant in Le-Puy-en-Velay, which he named Grande Distillerie du Velay Rumillet-Charretier, adding his wife's surname to his own.

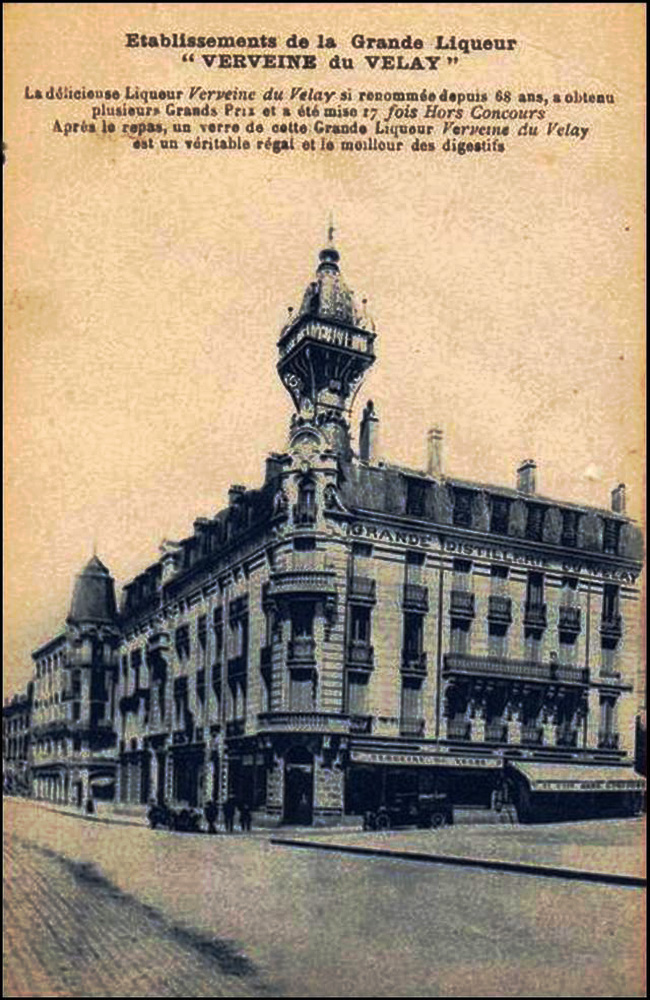
Postcard view of the Grande Distillerie du Velay Rumillet-Charretier in Le-Puy-en-Velay.

Rumillet subsequently took up politics, first as a town councillor in Le-Puy-en-Velay from 1880 to 1892, and then as a deputy for Haute-Loire from 1885 to 1889.

In 1886, he appointed his cousin Victor Pagès as manager of the distillery, and its reputation continued to develop. Joseph Rumillet retired from the business in 1891 to a house in Vals-près-le-Puy which he named, appropriately, Villa des Verveines. At this point he transferred ownership of the distillery to Victor Pagès, who renamed it Verveine du Velay Pagès.

The business remained under Pagès family control until 1984, when it was acquired by another well-known family-controlled drinks company, Renaud-Cointreau.

== The Pagès liqueurs ==
Lemon verbena is cultivated, harvested, and dried in the local Velay district of Haute-Loire, partly under the direction of the distillery and partly by the Carmelite nunnery at Vals-près-Le-Puy. It is planted each year in May, growing to about a metre high and harvested before the first frost in September.

In addition to lemon verbena, the process uses juniper berries, mace, and some thirty other herbs and spices. Certain of these botanicals are soaked in a diluted alcohol solution for several weeks, resulting in a liquid with a deep green colour and strong bouquet. The rest are heated in special bain-marie copper stills with brandy, water, and plain alcohol, capturing the aromatics and producing a rich distillate. Honey from the Auvergne, sugar, and cognac are then added, creating the different blends:

- Green (the best known, with 55% alcohol),
- Gold (a softer blend, 40%),
- Extra (with added cognac and matured for two years, 40%)
- La Petite (weaker, 18%).

Five- and ten-year-old variants complete the range. The product is then aged for a year or more in oak barrels and bottled at the Pagès-Vedrenne site in Nuits-Saint-Georges.

About 150,000 bottles are produced annually. Other than France, it is also popular in the Benelux, Scandinavia, the Far East, and the USA.

Verveine du Velay is also used as an ingredient in soufflés, ice creams, macaroons and cakes, as well as to add flavour to certain beers.

The Pagès distillery is recognised by the French State as an Entreprise du Patrimoine Vivant (Living Heritage Company), having excellence in traditional skills.

== Other verbena-based liqueurs ==
Other verbena-based liqueurs in France are produced by artisan, family-based concerns, mainly in the Alpes and Massif Central.

- Verveine Artisanale is also based in Le-Puy-en-Velay. It has a lower alcoholic strength.
- Verveine du Vivarais was first created in Craponne sur Arzon by Claude-Jean Charbonnier and sold under the name "Maison Charbonnier." It was reestablished in 1967 and is still produced by the same family.
- A verbena and lemon-based liqueur is made in Venelles, Provence, by Liquoristie de Provence. The Abbaye de Lérins makes a Verveine digestif, at 35% ABV.
