= Saint-Geneys-près-Saint-Paulien =

- Commune
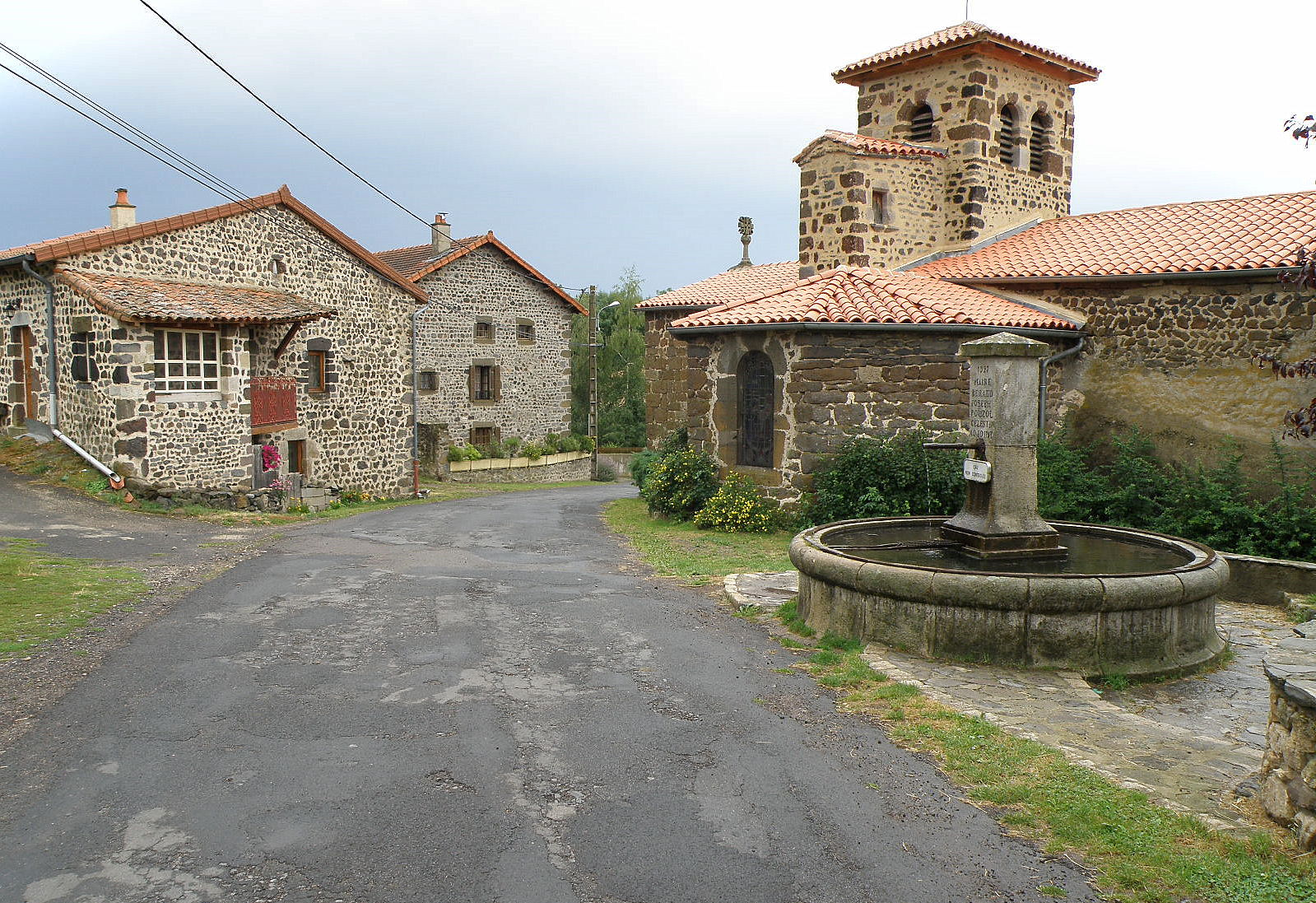
- Location of Saint-Geneys-près-Saint-Paulien
- Location within France Location within Auvergne-Rhône-Alpes
- Coordinates: 45°09′44″N 3°49′29″E
- Country: France
- Region: Auvergne-Rhône-Alpes
- Department: Haute-Loire
- Arrondissement: Le Puy-en-Velay
- Canton: Saint-Paulien
- Intercommunality: CA du Puy-en-Velay

Government
  - Mayor (2020–2026): Jean-François Gisclon
- Area^{1}: 16.49 km^{2} (6.37 sq mi)
- Elevation: 905 m (2,969 ft)
- Highest elevation: 1,098 m (3,602 ft)
- Lowest elevation: 750 m (2,460 ft)
- Population (2023): 313
  - Density: 19.0/km^{2} (49.2/sq mi)
- Time zone: UTC+01:00 (CET)
  - Summer (DST): UTC+02:00 (CEST)
- INSEE/Postal code: 43187 /43350
- ^{1} French Land Register data, which excludes lakes, ponds, glaciers > 1 km^{2} (0.386 sq mi or 247 acres) and river estuaries.

Saint-Geneys-près-Saint-Paulien (French pronunciation: [sɛ̃ ʒənɛ pʁɛ sɛ̃ poljɛ̃], literally Saint-Geneys near Saint-Paulien; Occitan: Sent Genèis de Sant Paulian) is a commune in the Haute-Loire department in south-central France.

== Population ==
Historical population
Year	Pop.	±% p.a.
1968	305	—
1975	239	−3.42%
1982	228	−0.67%
1990	227	−0.05%
1999	254	+1.26%
2007	302	+2.19%
2012	305	+0.20%
2017	317	+0.77%
2023	313	−0.21%
Source: INSEE

== See also ==
- Communes of the Haute-Loire department
