= Le Vernet, Haute-Loire =

Le Vernet
- Commune
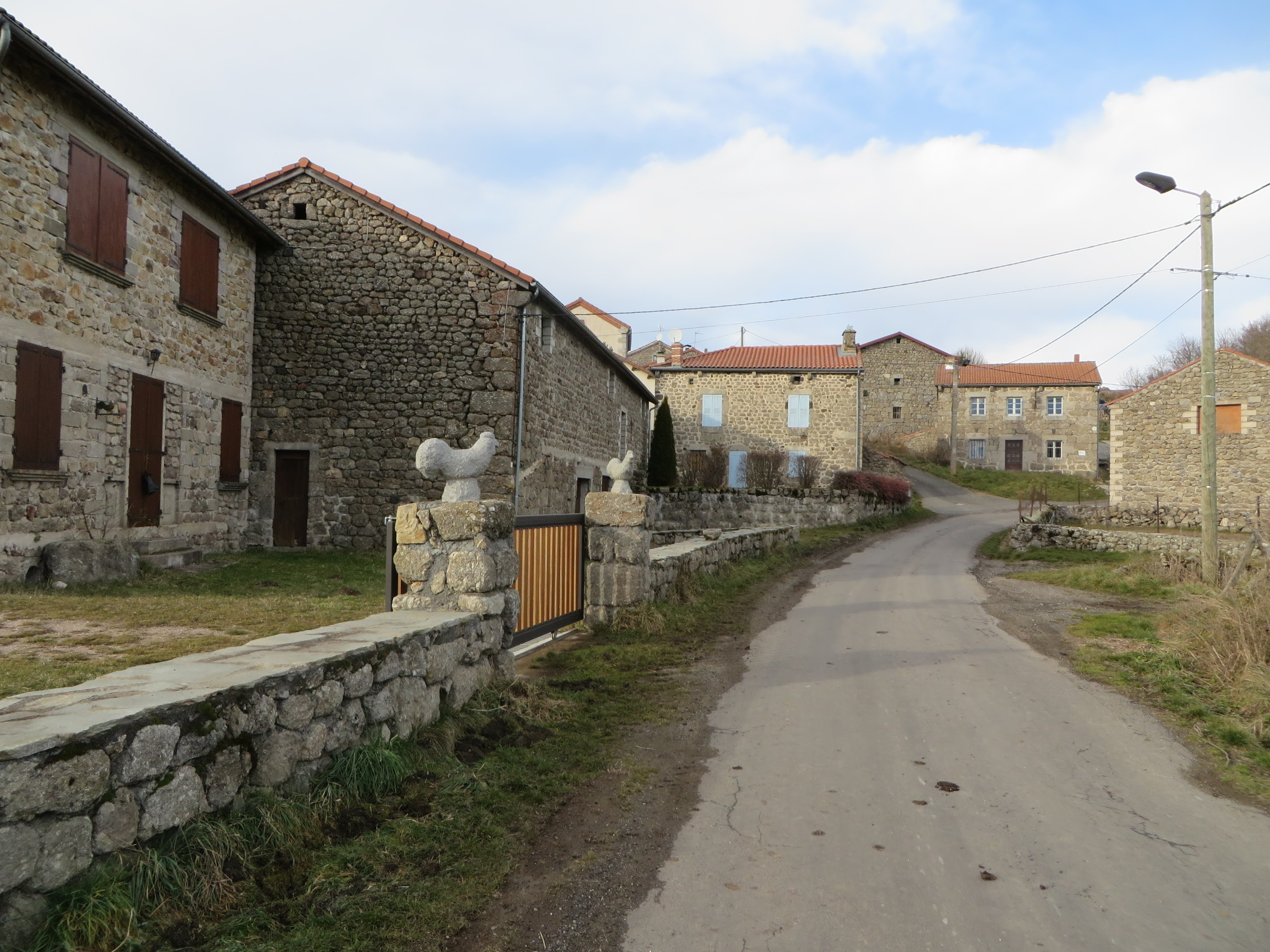
- Location of Le Vernet
- Location within France Location within Auvergne-Rhône-Alpes
- Coordinates: 45°02′15″N 3°40′21″E
- Country: France
- Region: Auvergne-Rhône-Alpes
- Department: Haute-Loire
- Arrondissement: Le Puy-en-Velay
- Canton: Saint-Paulien
- Intercommunality: CA du Puy-en-Velay

Government
  - Mayor (2020–2026): Alain Lioutaud
- Area^{1}: 3.82 km^{2} (1.47 sq mi)
- Elevation: 1,120 m (3,670 ft)
- Highest elevation: 1,301 m (4,268 ft)
- Lowest elevation: 1,070 m (3,510 ft)
- Population (2023): 22
  - Density: 5.8/km^{2} (15/sq mi)
- Time zone: UTC+01:00 (CET)
  - Summer (DST): UTC+02:00 (CEST)
- INSEE/Postal code: 43260 /43320
- ^{1} French Land Register data, which excludes lakes, ponds, glaciers > 1 km^{2} (0.386 sq mi or 247 acres) and river estuaries.

Le Vernet (French pronunciation: [lə vɛʁnɛ]; Occitan: Lo Vernet) is a commune in the Haute-Loire department in south-central France. The Le Vernet village belongs to the district of Le Puy-en-Velay and the canton of Loudes.

== Population ==
Historical population
Year	Pop.	±% p.a.
1968	79	—
1975	67	−2.33%
1982	67	+0.00%
1990	52	−3.12%
1999	40	−2.87%
2007	37	−0.97%
2012	22	−9.88%
2017	24	+1.76%
2023	22	−1.44%
Source: INSEE

== See also ==
- Communes of the Haute-Loire department
