= Arrondissement of Le Puy-en-Velay =

Coordinates: 45°02′39″N 3°53′05″E

Le Puy-en-Velay
- Arrondissement
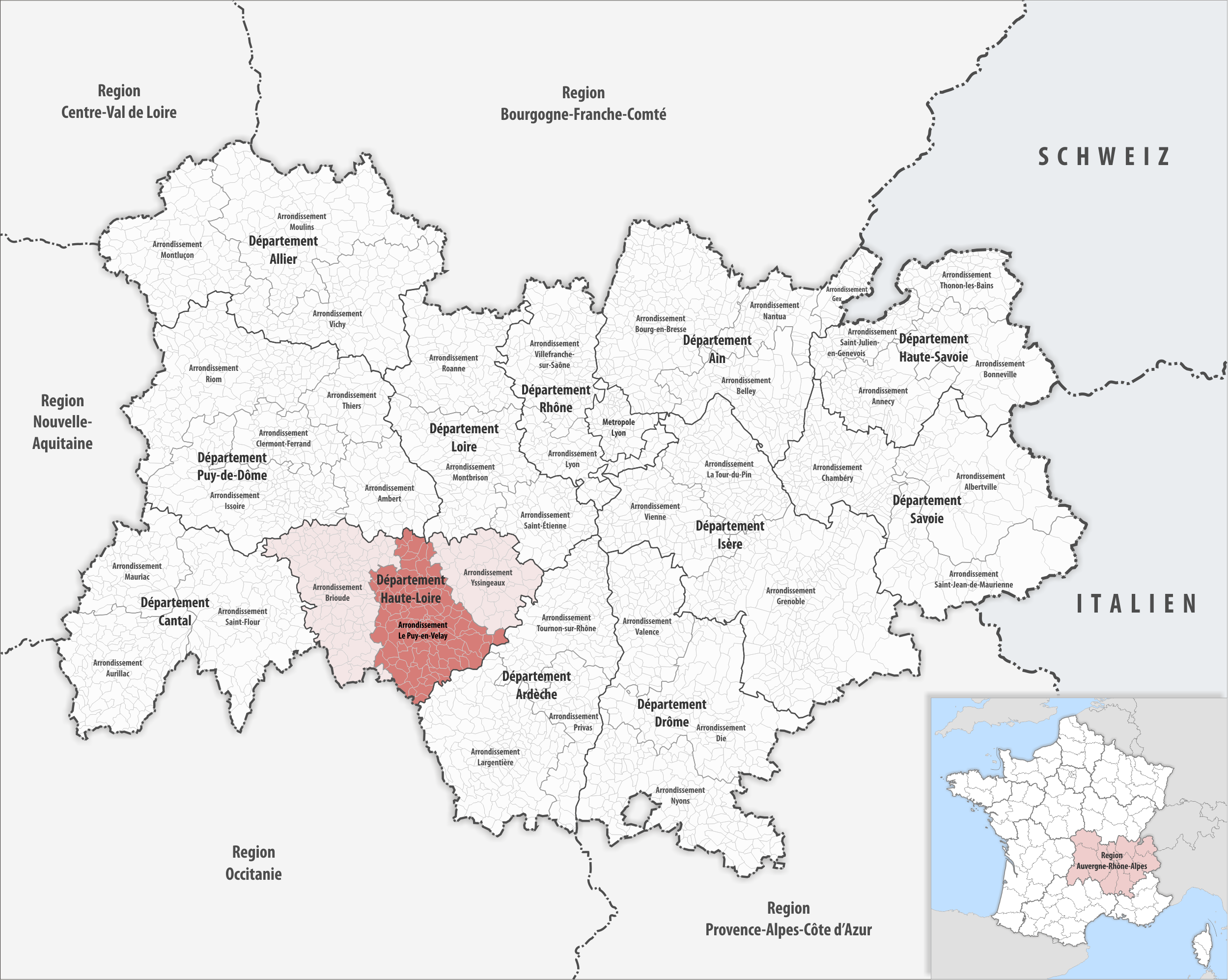
- Location within the region Auvergne-Rhône-Alpes
- Country: France
- Region: Auvergne-Rhône-Alpes
- Department: Haute-Loire
- No. of communes: {{{nbcomm}}}
- Area: 1,930.7 km^{2} (745.4 sq mi)
- Population (2023): 97,009
  - Density: 50.246/km^{2} (130.14/sq mi)
- INSEE code: 432

The arrondissement of Le Puy-en-Velay is an arrondissement of France in the Haute-Loire department in the Auvergne-Rhône-Alpes region. It has 102 communes. Its population is 96,495 (2021), and its area is 1,930.7 km^{2} (745.4 sq mi).

== Composition ==
The communes of the arrondissement of Le Puy-en-Velay, and their INSEE codes, are:

1. Aiguilhe (43002)
2. Allègre (43003)
3. Alleyrac (43004)
4. Alleyras (43005)
5. Arlempdes (43008)
6. Arsac-en-Velay (43010)
7. Bains (43018)
8. Barges (43019)
9. Beaulieu (43021)
10. Beaune-sur-Arzon (43023)
11. Bellevue-la-Montagne (43026)
12. Blanzac (43030)
13. Blavozy (43032)
14. Borne (43036)
15. Le Bouchet-Saint-Nicolas (43037)
16. Le Brignon (43039)
17. Brives-Charensac (43041)
18. Cayres (43042)
19. Céaux-d'Allègre (43043)
20. Ceyssac (43045)
21. Chadrac (43046)
22. Chadron (43047)
23. Chamalières-sur-Loire (43049)
24. Champclause (43053)
25. La Chapelle-Bertin (43057)
26. Chaspinhac (43061)
27. Chaspuzac (43062)
28. Chaudeyrolles (43066)
29. Chomelix (43071)
30. Costaros (43077)
31. Coubon (43078)
32. Craponne-sur-Arzon (43080)
33. Cussac-sur-Loire (43084)
34. Espaly-Saint-Marcel (43089)
35. Les Estables (43091)
36. Fay-sur-Lignon (43092)
37. Fix-Saint-Geneys (43095)
38. Freycenet-la-Cuche (43097)
39. Freycenet-la-Tour (43098)
40. Goudet (43101)
41. Jullianges (43108)
42. Lafarre (43109)
43. Landos (43111)
44. Lantriac (43113)
45. Laussonne (43115)
46. Lavoûte-sur-Loire (43119)
47. Lissac (43122)
48. Loudes (43124)
49. Malrevers (43126)
50. Mézères (43134)
51. Le Monastier-sur-Gazeille (43135)
52. Monlet (43138)
53. Le Monteil (43140)
54. Montusclat (43143)
55. Moudeyres (43144)
56. Ouides (43145)
57. Le Pertuis (43150)
58. Polignac (43152)
59. Pradelles (43154)
60. Présailles (43156)
61. Le Puy-en-Velay (43157)
62. Queyrières (43158)
63. Rauret (43160)
64. Roche-en-Régnier (43164)
65. Rosières (43165)
66. Saint-Arcons-de-Barges (43168)
67. Saint-Christophe-sur-Dolaizon (43174)
68. Saint-Étienne-du-Vigan (43180)
69. Saint-Étienne-Lardeyrol (43181)
70. Saint-Front (43186)
71. Saint-Geneys-près-Saint-Paulien (43187)
72. Saint-Georges-Lagricol (43189)
73. Saint-Germain-Laprade (43190)
74. Saint-Haon (43192)
75. Saint-Hostien (43194)
76. Saint-Jean-d'Aubrigoux (43196)
77. Saint-Jean-de-Nay (43197)
78. Saint-Jean-Lachalm (43198)
79. Saint-Julien-Chapteuil (43200)
80. Saint-Julien-d'Ance (43201)
81. Saint-Martin-de-Fugères (43210)
82. Saint-Paul-de-Tartas (43215)
83. Saint-Paulien (43216)
84. Saint-Pierre-du-Champ (43217)
85. Saint-Pierre-Eynac (43218)
86. Saint-Privat-d'Allier (43221)
87. Saint-Victor-sur-Arlanc (43228)
88. Saint-Vidal (43229)
89. Saint-Vincent (43230)
90. Salettes (43231)
91. Sanssac-l'Église (43233)
92. Séneujols (43238)
93. Solignac-sur-Loire (43241)
94. Vals-près-le-Puy (43251)
95. Varennes-Saint-Honorat (43252)
96. Les Vastres (43253)
97. Vazeilles-Limandre (43254)
98. Vergezac (43257)
99. Vernassal (43259)
100. Le Vernet (43260)
101. Vielprat (43263)
102. Vorey (43267)

== History ==
The arrondissement of Le Puy-en-Velay was created in 1800. In 2007 it lost the canton of Saugues to the arrondissement of Brioude.

As a result of the reorganisation of the cantons of France which came into effect in 2015, the borders of the cantons are no longer related to the borders of the arrondissements. The cantons of the arrondissement of Le Puy-en-Velay were, as of January 2015:

1. Allègre
2. Cayres
3. Craponne-sur-Arzon
4. Fay-sur-Lignon
5. Loudes
6. Le Monastier-sur-Gazeille
7. Pradelles
8. Le Puy-en-Velay-Est
9. Le Puy-en-Velay-Nord
10. Le Puy-en-Velay-Ouest
11. Le Puy-en-Velay-Sud-Est
12. Le Puy-en-Velay-Sud-Ouest
13. Saint-Julien-Chapteuil
14. Saint-Paulien
15. Solignac-sur-Loire
16. Vorey
