= Vazeilles-Limandre =

- Commune
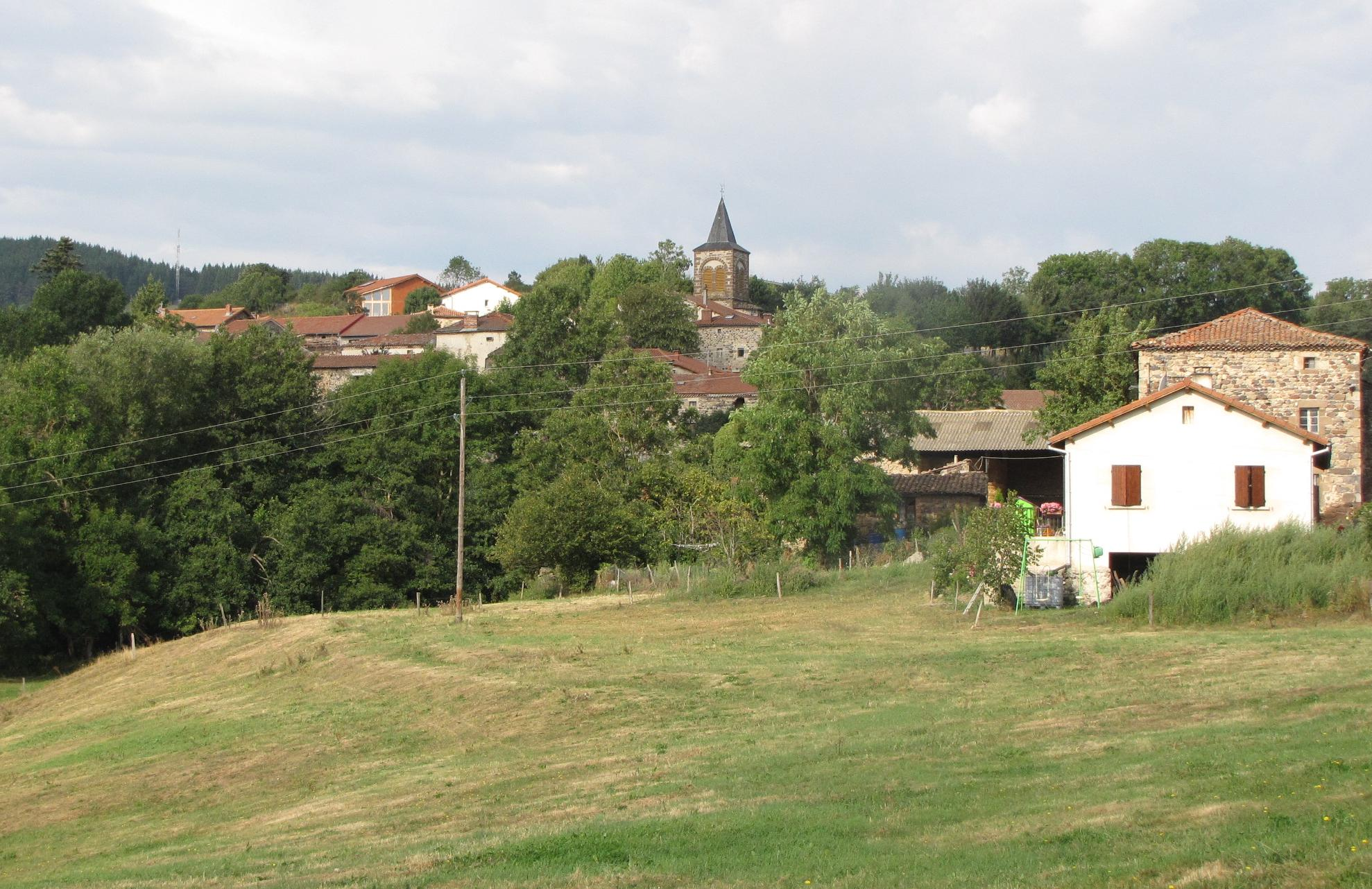

- Coat of arms
- Location of Vazeilles-Limandre
- Location within France Location within Auvergne-Rhône-Alpes
- Coordinates: 45°06′51″N 3°41′57″E
- Country: France
- Region: Auvergne-Rhône-Alpes
- Department: Haute-Loire
- Arrondissement: Le Puy-en-Velay
- Canton: Saint-Paulien
- Intercommunality: CA du Puy-en-Velay

Government
  - Mayor (2020–2026): Yves Tafin
- Area^{1}: 11.72 km^{2} (4.53 sq mi)
- Elevation: 1,000 m (3,300 ft)
- Highest elevation: 1,197 m (3,927 ft)
- Lowest elevation: 877 m (2,877 ft)
- Population (2023): 268
  - Density: 22.9/km^{2} (59.2/sq mi)
- Time zone: UTC+01:00 (CET)
  - Summer (DST): UTC+02:00 (CEST)
- INSEE/Postal code: 43254 /43320
- ^{1} French Land Register data, which excludes lakes, ponds, glaciers > 1 km^{2} (0.386 sq mi or 247 acres) and river estuaries.

Vazeilles-Limandre (French pronunciation: [vazɛj limɑ̃dʁ]) is a commune in the Haute-Loire department in south-central France in the region Auvergne.

== Etymology ==
Vazeilles-Limandre (Vallilias is meaning " little valley" or "petite vallée" in French) has been known under various names through the centuries.

The distinction between Vazeilles-bas and Vazeilles-haut appeared during the 14th Century.

Vazeilles-bas: Villa inferior de Vazellas (1342); Vazellas inferior (1459); Vaselhas Bassas (1538)

Vazeilles-haut: Villa superior de Vazelhas (1347); Vazehlas Sobeyranas (1457)

Parochia de Vasilis (1470)

Vazaleiz (1511).

Vazeilles on the Map of Cassini (about 1769).

== Geography ==
Vazeilles-Limandre is located at about 20 kilometres northwest of Puy-en-Velay and 30 kilometres southeast of Brioude.

The village is split in two parts, Vazeilles-bas and Vazeilles-haut.

In addition, the commune consists of the hamlets of Beauregard, Fressanges, Limandre, Ninirolles and Sauzet.

== History ==
The discovery of archeological remains in the location of the commune shows a human presence at this time.

The first written documents doing reference to Vazeilles are the archives of Brioude in 969. They present Vazeilles as a "villa" depending on the vicar area of Saint-Paulien.

== Population ==
Historical population
Year	Pop.	±% p.a.
1968	263	—
1975	259	−0.22%
1982	224	−2.05%
1990	202	−1.28%
1999	211	+0.49%
2007	225	+0.81%
2012	254	+2.45%
2017	253	−0.08%
2023	268	+0.96%
Source: INSEE

== See also ==
- Communes of the Haute-Loire department
