= Lissac =

Lissac may refer to:

- Lissac, Ariège, in the Ariège department
- Lissac, Haute-Loire, in the Haute-Loire department
- Lissac-et-Mouret, in the Lot department
- Lissac-sur-Couze, in the Corrèze department
- Lissac, a French eyewear company, renamed Silor, a predecessor to Essilor
