= Chadrac =

- Commune
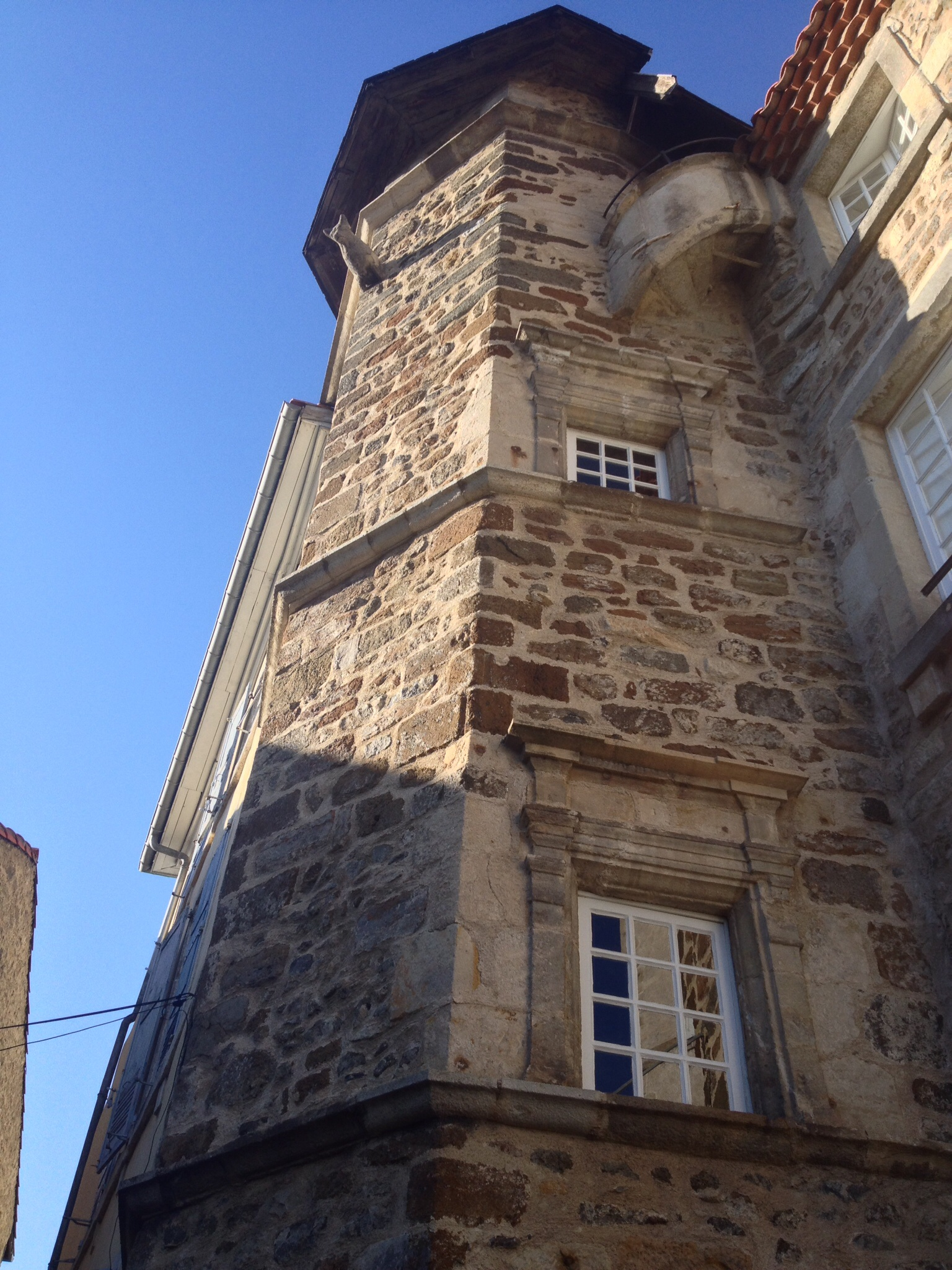
- Location of Chadrac
- Location within France Location within Auvergne-Rhône-Alpes
- Coordinates: 45°03′52″N 3°54′23″E
- Country: France
- Region: Auvergne-Rhône-Alpes
- Department: Haute-Loire
- Arrondissement: Le Puy-en-Velay
- Canton: Le Puy-en-Velay-2
- Intercommunality: CA du Puy-en-Velay

Government
  - Mayor (2020–2026): Corinne Bringer
- Area^{1}: 2.48 km^{2} (0.96 sq mi)
- Elevation: 614 m (2,014 ft)
- Highest elevation: 730 m (2,400 ft)
- Lowest elevation: 577 m (1,893 ft)
- Population (2023): 2,542
  - Density: 1,020/km^{2} (2,650/sq mi)
- Time zone: UTC+01:00 (CET)
  - Summer (DST): UTC+02:00 (CEST)
- INSEE/Postal code: 43046 /43770
- ^{1} French Land Register data, which excludes lakes, ponds, glaciers > 1 km^{2} (0.386 sq mi or 247 acres) and river estuaries.

Chadrac (French pronunciation: [ʃadʁak]) is a commune in the Haute-Loire department in south-central France.

== Population ==
Historical population

Year	Pop.	±% p.a.
1793	198	—
1821	256	+0.92%
1846	187	−1.25%
1872	233	+0.85%
1901	337	+1.28%
1926	416	+0.85%
1946	765	+3.09%
1962	953	+1.38%
1968	1,638	+9.45%

Year	Pop.	±% p.a.
1975	2,158	+4.02%
1982	3,031	+4.97%
1990	3,075	+0.18%
1999	3,011	−0.23%
2007	2,686	−1.42%
2012	2,654	−0.24%
2017	2,516	−1.06%
2023	2,542	+0.17%

Source: EHESS and INSEE (1968-2023)

== Climate ==
On average, Chadrac experiences 84.3 days per year with a minimum temperature below 0 °C (32.0 °F), 3.2 days per year with a minimum temperature below −10 °C (14.0 °F), 10 days per year with a maximum temperature below 0 °C (32.0 °F), and 18.9 days per year with a maximum temperature above 30 °C (86.0 °F). The record high temperature was 39.5 °C (103.1 °F) on 27 June 2019, while the record low temperature was −23.3 °C (−9.9 °F) on 15 February 1956.

Climate data for Chadrac, France, 1991–2020 normals, extremes 1928–present
Month	Jan	Feb	Mar	Apr	May	Jun	Jul	Aug	Sep	Oct	Nov	Dec	Year
Record high °C (°F)	19.2 (66.6)	23.8 (74.8)	25.2 (77.4)	28.0 (82.4)	34.0 (93.2)	39.5 (103.1)	38.3 (100.9)	38.8 (101.8)	35.6 (96.1)	27.9 (82.2)	22.8 (73.0)	17.8 (64.0)	39.5 (103.1)
Mean daily maximum °C (°F)	6.0 (42.8)	7.7 (45.9)	11.8 (53.2)	14.7 (58.5)	19.0 (66.2)	23.3 (73.9)	26.2 (79.2)	26.1 (79.0)	21.1 (70.0)	16.1 (61.0)	10.0 (50.0)	6.6 (43.9)	15.7 (60.3)
Daily mean °C (°F)	2.4 (36.3)	3.2 (37.8)	6.1 (43.0)	9.4 (48.9)	13.1 (55.6)	16.9 (62.4)	19.3 (66.7)	19.1 (66.4)	14.9 (58.8)	11.3 (52.3)	6.2 (43.2)	3.1 (37.6)	10.4 (50.8)
Mean daily minimum °C (°F)	−1.3 (29.7)	−1.4 (29.5)	1.0 (33.8)	3.5 (38.3)	7.2 (45.0)	10.6 (51.1)	12.4 (54.3)	12.0 (53.6)	8.7 (47.7)	6.5 (43.7)	2.3 (36.1)	−0.4 (31.3)	5.1 (41.2)
Record low °C (°F)	−22.7 (−8.9)	−23.3 (−9.9)	−19.5 (−3.1)	−7.7 (18.1)	−5.4 (22.3)	−0.5 (31.1)	2.2 (36.0)	1.4 (34.5)	−3.1 (26.4)	−8.0 (17.6)	−12.7 (9.1)	−19.7 (−3.5)	−23.3 (−9.9)
Average precipitation mm (inches)	34.1 (1.34)	22.3 (0.88)	27.3 (1.07)	53.6 (2.11)	75.5 (2.97)	71.3 (2.81)	57.3 (2.26)	64.2 (2.53)	65.9 (2.59)	66.1 (2.60)	62.7 (2.47)	31.7 (1.25)	632.0 (24.88)
Average precipitation days (≥ 1.0 mm)	6.2	5.7	5.9	8.8	9.4	7.7	6.5	7.8	7.5	8.3	8.5	6.1	88.4
Source: Meteociel

== See also ==
- Communes of the Haute-Loire department
