= Saint-Vidal =

- Commune
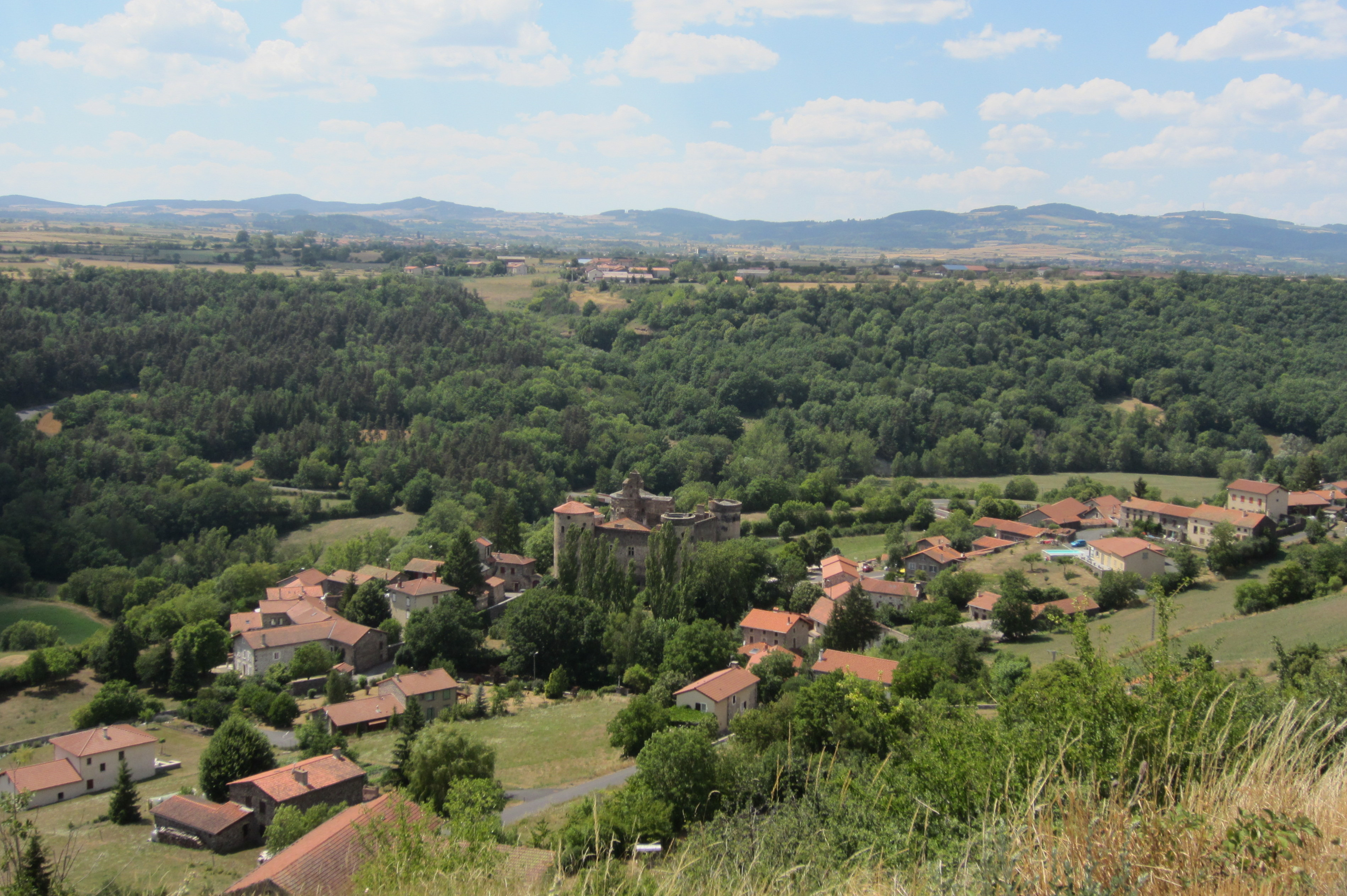
- Location of Saint-Vidal
- Location within France Location within Auvergne-Rhône-Alpes
- Coordinates: 45°04′32″N 3°48′03″E
- Country: France
- Region: Auvergne-Rhône-Alpes
- Department: Haute-Loire
- Arrondissement: Le Puy-en-Velay
- Canton: Saint-Paulien
- Intercommunality: CA du Puy-en-Velay

Government
  - Mayor (2020–2026): Gérard Gros
- Area^{1}: 7.71 km^{2} (2.98 sq mi)
- Elevation: 740 m (2,430 ft)
- Highest elevation: 924 m (3,031 ft)
- Lowest elevation: 682 m (2,238 ft)
- Population (2023): 608
  - Density: 78.9/km^{2} (204/sq mi)
- Time zone: UTC+01:00 (CET)
  - Summer (DST): UTC+02:00 (CEST)
- INSEE/Postal code: 43229 /43320
- ^{1} French Land Register data, which excludes lakes, ponds, glaciers > 1 km^{2} (0.386 sq mi or 247 acres) and river estuaries.

Saint-Vidal (French pronunciation: [sɛ̃ vidal]; Occitan: Sant Vidal) is a commune in the Haute-Loire department in south-central France.

== Population ==
Historical population
Year	Pop.	±% p.a.
1968	236	—
1975	242	+0.36%
1982	278	+2.00%
1990	319	+1.73%
1999	355	+1.20%
2007	459	+3.26%
2012	541	+3.34%
2017	603	+2.19%
2023	608	+0.14%
Source: INSEE

== See also ==
- Communes of the Haute-Loire department
