= Canton of Le Puy-en-Velay-1 =

Coordinates: 45.04°N 3.88°E

The canton of Le Puy-en-Velay-1 is an administrative division of the Haute-Loire department, south-central France. It was created at the French canton reorganisation which came into effect in March 2015. Its seat is in Le Puy-en-Velay.

It consists of the following communes:

1. Ceyssac
2. Espaly-Saint-Marcel
3. Le Puy-en-Velay (partly)
4. Vals-près-le-Puy
