= Le Pertuis =

- Commune
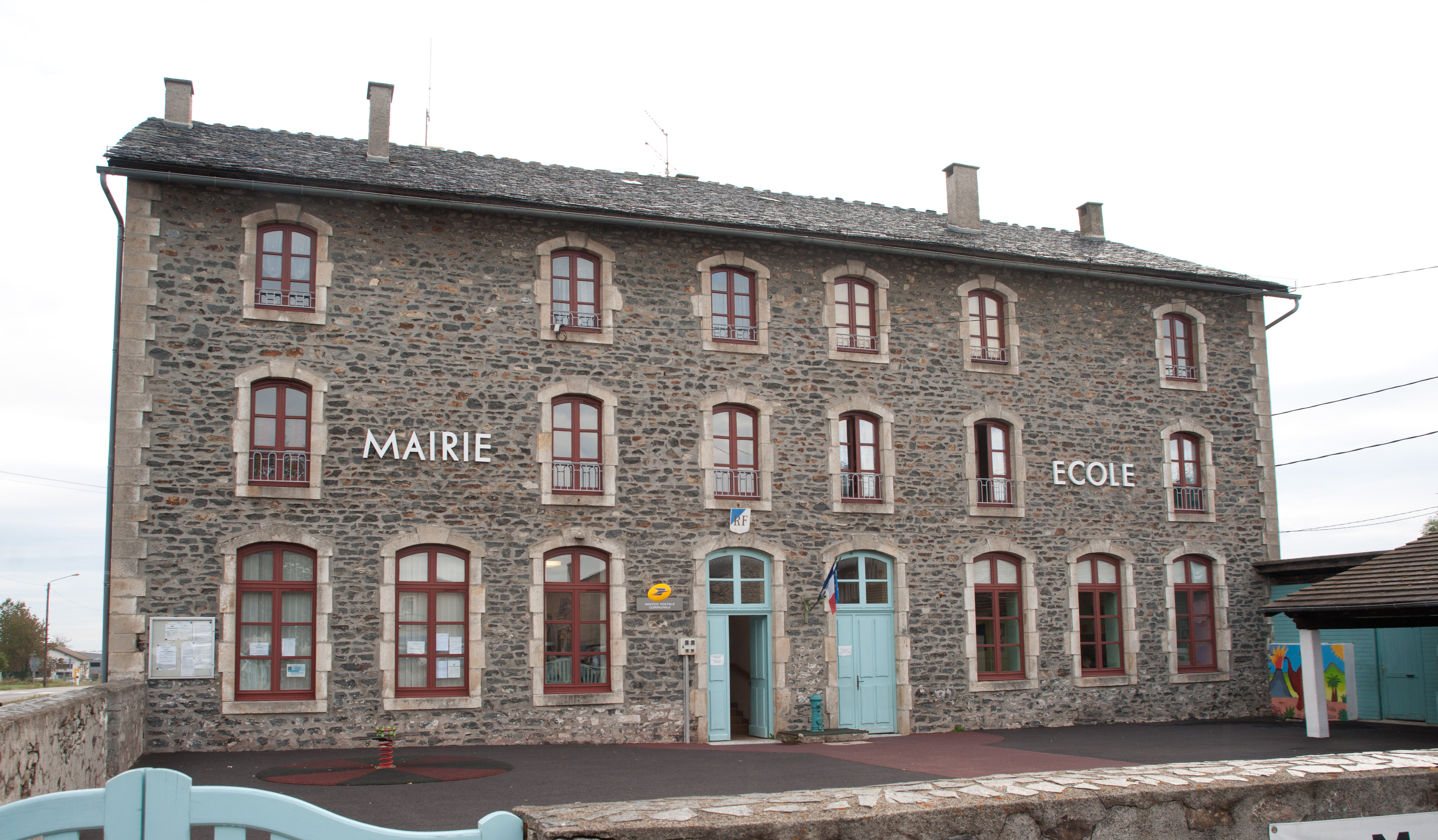
- Town hall
- Location of Le Pertuis
- Location within France Location within Auvergne-Rhône-Alpes
- Coordinates: 45°05′50″N 4°03′35″E
- Country: France
- Region: Auvergne-Rhône-Alpes
- Department: Haute-Loire
- Arrondissement: Le Puy-en-Velay
- Canton: Emblavez-et-Meygal
- Intercommunality: CA du Puy-en-Velay

Government
  - Mayor (2020–2026): Sébastien Masson
- Area^{1}: 11.89 km^{2} (4.59 sq mi)
- Elevation: 1,026 m (3,366 ft)
- Highest elevation: 1,255 m (4,117 ft)
- Lowest elevation: 879 m (2,884 ft)
- Population (2023): 576
  - Density: 48.4/km^{2} (125/sq mi)
- Time zone: UTC+01:00 (CET)
  - Summer (DST): UTC+02:00 (CEST)
- INSEE/Postal code: 43150 /43200
- ^{1} French Land Register data, which excludes lakes, ponds, glaciers > 1 km^{2} (0.386 sq mi or 247 acres) and river estuaries.

Le Pertuis (French pronunciation: [lə pɛʁtɥi]; Occitan: Lo Pertús) is a commune in the Haute-Loire department in south-central France.

== Population ==
Historical population
Year	Pop.	±% p.a.
1968	419	—
1975	413	−0.21%
1982	347	−2.46%
1990	327	−0.74%
1999	375	+1.53%
2007	416	+1.31%
2012	430	+0.66%
2017	455	+1.14%
2023	576	+4.01%
Source: INSEE

== See also ==
- Communes of the Haute-Loire department
