= Fix-Saint-Geneys =

- Commune
- Location of Fix-Saint-Geneys
- Location within France Location within Auvergne-Rhône-Alpes
- Coordinates: 45°08′37″N 3°40′06″E
- Country: France
- Region: Auvergne-Rhône-Alpes
- Department: Haute-Loire
- Arrondissement: Le Puy-en-Velay
- Canton: Saint-Paulien
- Intercommunality: CA du Puy-en-Velay

Government
  - Mayor (2020–2026): Jean-François Gallien
- Area^{1}: 7.91 km^{2} (3.05 sq mi)
- Elevation: 1,112 m (3,648 ft)
- Highest elevation: 1,195 m (3,921 ft)
- Lowest elevation: 951 m (3,120 ft)
- Population (2023): 143
  - Density: 18.1/km^{2} (46.8/sq mi)
- Time zone: UTC+01:00 (CET)
  - Summer (DST): UTC+02:00 (CEST)
- INSEE/Postal code: 43095 /43320
- ^{1} French Land Register data, which excludes lakes, ponds, glaciers > 1 km^{2} (0.386 sq mi or 247 acres) and river estuaries.

Fix-Saint-Geneys (French pronunciation: [fiks sɛ̃ ʒənɛ]; Occitan: Fins-Sent-Genèis) is a commune in the Haute-Loire department in south-central France.

== Population ==
Historical population
Year	Pop.	±% p.a.
1968	269	—
1975	229	−2.27%
1982	190	−2.63%
1990	173	−1.16%
1999	138	−2.48%
2007	152	+1.22%
2012	141	−1.49%
2017	123	−2.69%
2023	143	+2.54%
Source: INSEE

== See also ==
- Communes of the Haute-Loire department
