= Beaune-sur-Arzon =

- Commune
- Location of Beaune-sur-Arzon
- Location within France Location within Auvergne-Rhône-Alpes
- Coordinates: 45°16′51″N 3°48′59″E
- Country: France
- Region: Auvergne-Rhône-Alpes
- Department: Haute-Loire
- Arrondissement: Le Puy-en-Velay
- Canton: Plateau du Haut-Velay granitique
- Intercommunality: CA du Puy-en-Velay

Government
  - Mayor (2020–2026): Isabelle Seon
- Area^{1}: 14.38 km^{2} (5.55 sq mi)
- Elevation: 930 m (3,050 ft)
- Highest elevation: 1,073 m (3,520 ft)
- Lowest elevation: 885 m (2,904 ft)
- Population (2023): 227
  - Density: 15.8/km^{2} (40.9/sq mi)
- Time zone: UTC+01:00 (CET)
  - Summer (DST): UTC+02:00 (CEST)
- INSEE/Postal code: 43023 /43500
- ^{1} French Land Register data, which excludes lakes, ponds, glaciers > 1 km^{2} (0.386 sq mi or 247 acres) and river estuaries.

Beaune-sur-Arzon (French pronunciation: [bon syʁ aʁzɔ̃]) is a commune in the Haute-Loire department in south-central France.

== Population ==
Historical population
Year	Pop.	±% p.a.
1968	277	—
1975	239	−2.09%
1982	213	−1.63%
1990	205	−0.48%
1999	189	−0.90%
2007	205	+1.02%
2012	221	+1.51%
2017	221	+0.00%
2023	227	+0.45%
Source: INSEE

== See also ==
- Communes of the Haute-Loire department
