= Blanzac, Haute-Loire =

Blanzac
- Commune
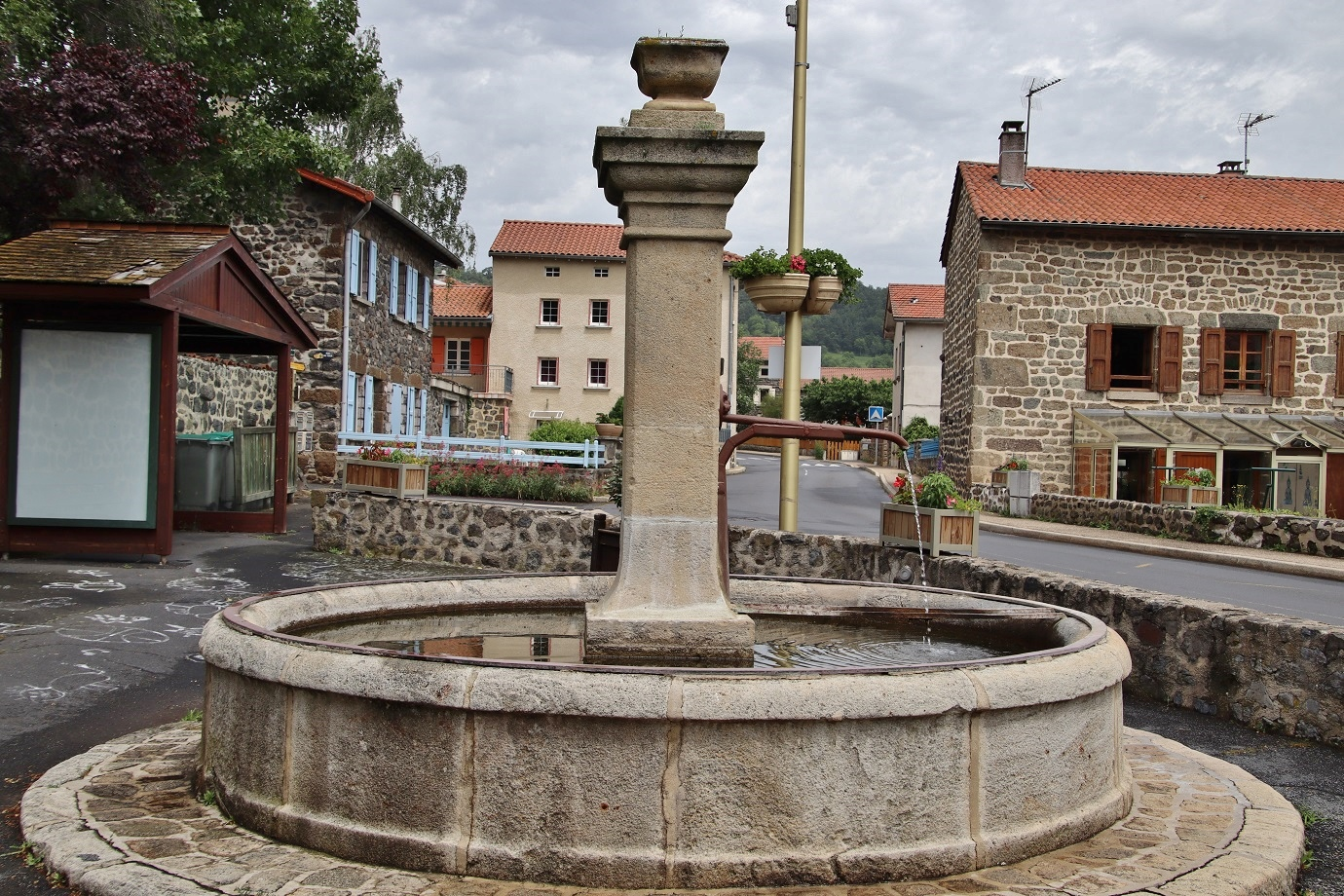
- Location of Blanzac
- Location within France Location within Auvergne-Rhône-Alpes
- Coordinates: 45°06′34″N 3°50′32″E
- Country: France
- Region: Auvergne-Rhône-Alpes
- Department: Haute-Loire
- Arrondissement: Le Puy-en-Velay
- Canton: Saint-Paulien
- Intercommunality: CA du Puy-en-Velay

Government
  - Mayor (2020–2026): Jean-Marc Boyer
- Area^{1}: 8.58 km^{2} (3.31 sq mi)
- Elevation: 714 m (2,343 ft)
- Highest elevation: 915 m (3,002 ft)
- Lowest elevation: 569 m (1,867 ft)
- Population (2023): 464
  - Density: 54.1/km^{2} (140/sq mi)
- Time zone: UTC+01:00 (CET)
  - Summer (DST): UTC+02:00 (CEST)
- INSEE/Postal code: 43030 /43350
- ^{1} French Land Register data, which excludes lakes, ponds, glaciers > 1 km^{2} (0.386 sq mi or 247 acres) and river estuaries.

Blanzac (French pronunciation: [blɑ̃zak]) is a commune in the Haute-Loire department in south-central France.

== Population ==
Historical population
| Year | Pop. | ±% p.a. |
|---|---|---|
| 1968 | 195 | — |
| 1975 | 191 | −0.30% |
| 1982 | 190 | −0.07% |
| 1990 | 214 | +1.50% |
| 1999 | 267 | +2.49% |
| 2007 | 298 | +1.38% |
| 2012 | 327 | +1.87% |
| 2017 | 402 | +4.22% |
| 2023 | 464 | +2.42% |
Source: INSEE

== See also ==
- Communes of the Haute-Loire department
