= Céaux-d'Allègre =

- Commune
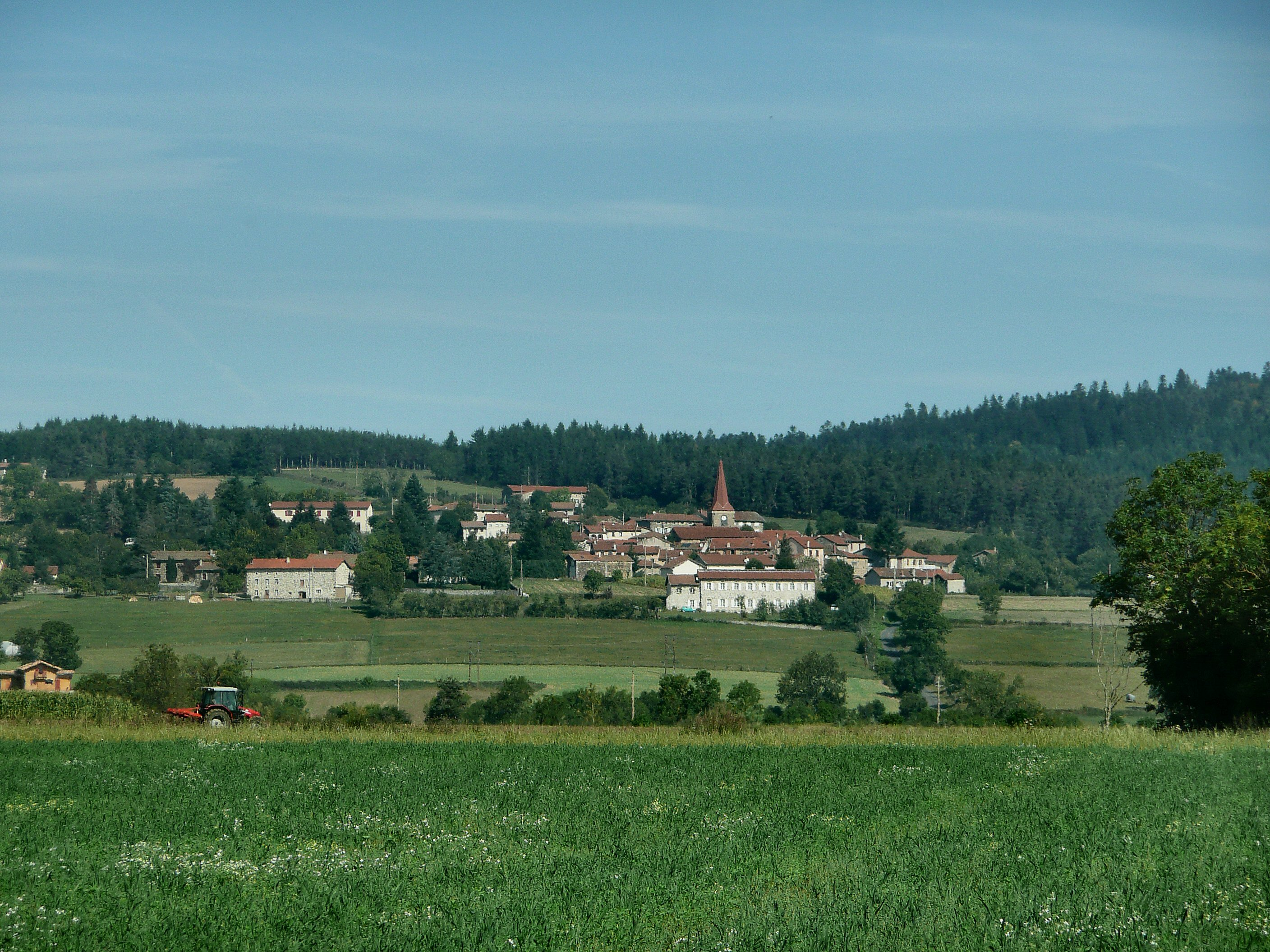
- Location of Céaux-d'Allègre
- Location within France Location within Auvergne-Rhône-Alpes
- Coordinates: 45°10′55″N 3°44′53″E
- Country: France
- Region: Auvergne-Rhône-Alpes
- Department: Haute-Loire
- Arrondissement: Le Puy-en-Velay
- Canton: Saint-Paulien
- Intercommunality: CA du Puy-en-Velay

Government
  - Mayor (2020–2026): Maguy Masse
- Area^{1}: 32.41 km^{2} (12.51 sq mi)
- Elevation: 900 m (3,000 ft)
- Highest elevation: 1,144 m (3,753 ft)
- Lowest elevation: 834 m (2,736 ft)
- Population (2023): 487
  - Density: 15.0/km^{2} (38.9/sq mi)
- Time zone: UTC+01:00 (CET)
  - Summer (DST): UTC+02:00 (CEST)
- INSEE/Postal code: 43043 /43270
- ^{1} French Land Register data, which excludes lakes, ponds, glaciers > 1 km^{2} (0.386 sq mi or 247 acres) and river estuaries.

Céaux-d'Allègre (French pronunciation: [seo dalɛɡʁ], literally Céaux of Allègre; Occitan: Ceu d'Alègre) is a commune in the Haute-Loire department in south-central France.

== Population ==
Historical population
Year	Pop.	±% p.a.
1968	676	—
1975	621	−1.20%
1982	511	−2.75%
1990	428	−2.19%
1999	412	−0.42%
2007	448	+1.05%
2012	466	+0.79%
2017	474	+0.34%
2023	487	+0.45%
Source: INSEE

== See also ==
- Communes of the Haute-Loire department
