= Vergezac =

- Commune
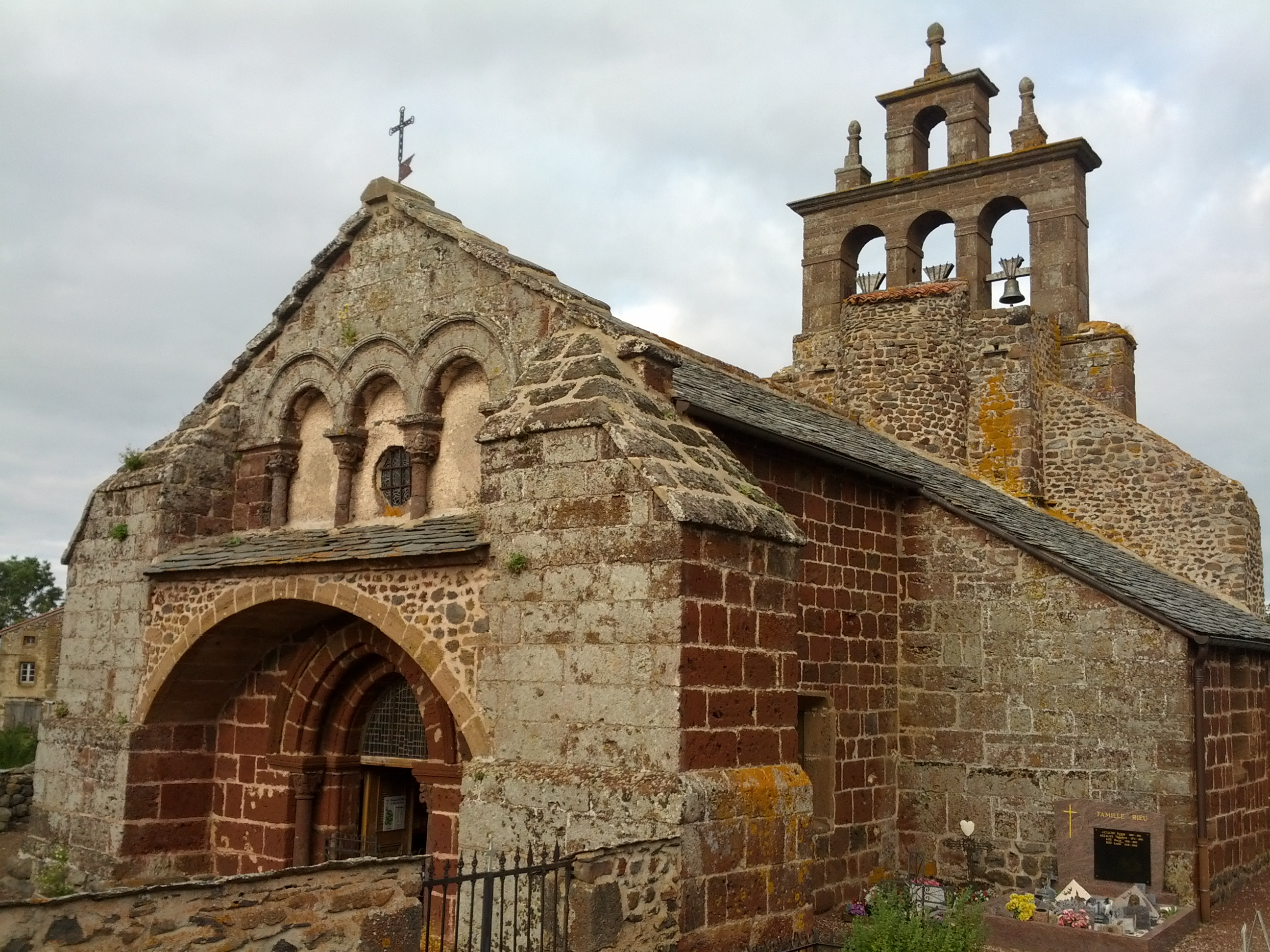
- The church in Vergezac

- Coat of arms
- Location of Vergezac
- Location within France Location within Auvergne-Rhône-Alpes
- Coordinates: 45°02′03″N 3°43′39″E
- Country: France
- Region: Auvergne-Rhône-Alpes
- Department: Haute-Loire
- Arrondissement: Le Puy-en-Velay
- Canton: Saint-Paulien
- Intercommunality: CA du Puy-en-Velay

Government
  - Mayor (2020–2026): Jocelyne Faisandier
- Area^{1}: 20.31 km^{2} (7.84 sq mi)
- Elevation: 1,000 m (3,300 ft)
- Highest elevation: 1,259 m (4,131 ft)
- Lowest elevation: 902 m (2,959 ft)
- Population (2023): 470
  - Density: 23/km^{2} (60/sq mi)
- Time zone: UTC+01:00 (CET)
  - Summer (DST): UTC+02:00 (CEST)
- INSEE/Postal code: 43257 /43320
- ^{1} French Land Register data, which excludes lakes, ponds, glaciers > 1 km^{2} (0.386 sq mi or 247 acres) and river estuaries.

Vergezac (French pronunciation: [vɛʁʒəzak]; Occitan: Vergesac) is a commune in the Haute-Loire department in south-central France.

== Population ==
Historical population
Year	Pop.	±% p.a.
1968	461	—
1975	415	−1.49%
1982	389	−0.92%
1990	391	+0.06%
1999	405	+0.39%
2007	433	+0.84%
2012	423	−0.47%
2017	502	+3.48%
2023	470	−1.09%
Source: INSEE

== See also ==
- Communes of the Haute-Loire department
