= Communauté d'agglomération du Puy-en-Velay =

Le Puy-en-Velay
- Communauté d'agglomération
- Interactive map of Le Puy-en-Velay
- Coordinates: 45°05′N 03°50′E
- Country: France
- Region: Auvergne-Rhône-Alpes
- Department: Haute-Loire
- No. of communes: {{{nbcomm}}}
- Established: 2017
- Area: 1,324.0 km^{2} (511.2 sq mi)
- Population (2019): 82,871
  - Density: 62.591/km^{2} (162.11/sq mi)
- Website: www.agglo-lepuyenvelay.fr

Communauté d'agglomération du Puy-en-Velay is the communauté d'agglomération, an intercommunal structure, centred on the town of Le Puy-en-Velay. It is located in the Haute-Loire department, in the Auvergne-Rhône-Alpes region, south-central France. Created in 2017, its seat is in Le Puy-en-Velay. Its area is 1324.0 km^{2}. Its population was 82,871 in 2019, of which 19,215 in Le Puy-en-Velay proper.

== Composition ==
The communauté d'agglomération consists of the following 72 communes:

1. Aiguilhe
2. Allègre
3. Arsac-en-Velay
4. Bains
5. Beaulieu
6. Beaune-sur-Arzon
7. Bellevue-la-Montagne
8. Blanzac
9. Blavozy
10. Bonneval
11. Borne
12. Le Brignon
13. Brives-Charensac
14. Céaux-d'Allègre
15. Ceyssac
16. Chadrac
17. La Chaise-Dieu
18. Chamalières-sur-Loire
19. La Chapelle-Bertin
20. La Chapelle-Geneste
21. Chaspinhac
22. Chaspuzac
23. Chomelix
24. Cistrières
25. Connangles
26. Coubon
27. Craponne-sur-Arzon
28. Cussac-sur-Loire
29. Espaly-Saint-Marcel
30. Félines
31. Fix-Saint-Geneys
32. Jullianges
33. Laval-sur-Doulon
34. Lavoûte-sur-Loire
35. Lissac
36. Loudes
37. Malrevers
38. Malvières
39. Mézères
40. Monistrol-d'Allier
41. Monlet
42. Le Monteil
43. Le Pertuis
44. Polignac
45. Le Puy-en-Velay
46. Roche-en-Régnier
47. Rosières
48. Saint-Christophe-sur-Dolaizon
49. Saint-Étienne-Lardeyrol
50. Saint-Geneys-près-Saint-Paulien
51. Saint-Georges-Lagricol
52. Saint-Germain-Laprade
53. Saint-Hostien
54. Saint-Jean-d'Aubrigoux
55. Saint-Jean-de-Nay
56. Saint-Julien-d'Ance
57. Saint-Paulien
58. Saint-Pierre-du-Champ
59. Saint-Préjet-d'Allier
60. Saint-Privat-d'Allier
61. Saint-Victor-sur-Arlanc
62. Saint-Vidal
63. Saint-Vincent
64. Sanssac-l'Église
65. Sembadel
66. Solignac-sur-Loire
67. Vals-près-le-Puy
68. Vazeilles-Limandre
69. Vergezac
70. Vernassal
71. Le Vernet
72. Vorey
