= Vals-près-le-Puy =

- Commune
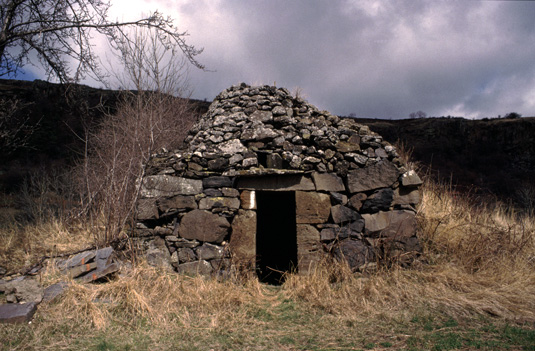

- Coat of arms
- Location of Vals-près-le-Puy
- Location within France Location within Auvergne-Rhône-Alpes
- Coordinates: 45°01′45″N 3°52′32″E
- Country: France
- Region: Auvergne-Rhône-Alpes
- Department: Haute-Loire
- Arrondissement: Le Puy-en-Velay
- Canton: Le Puy-en-Velay-1
- Intercommunality: CA du Puy-en-Velay

Government
  - Mayor (2024–2026): Philippe Joujon
- Area^{1}: 5.12 km^{2} (1.98 sq mi)
- Highest elevation: 850 m (2,790 ft)
- Lowest elevation: 632 m (2,073 ft)
- Population (2023): 3,395
  - Density: 663/km^{2} (1,720/sq mi)
- Time zone: UTC+01:00 (CET)
  - Summer (DST): UTC+02:00 (CEST)
- INSEE/Postal code: 43251 /43750
- ^{1} French Land Register data, which excludes lakes, ponds, glaciers > 1 km^{2} (0.386 sq mi or 247 acres) and river estuaries.

Vals-près-le-Puy (French pronunciation: [vals pʁɛ lə pɥi], lit. 'Vals near Le Puy'; Occitan: Val delh Puèi), is a commune in the Haute-Loire department in south-central France.

Its inhabitants are called Valladiers (masc.) and Valladières (fem.).

== Geography ==
The town is located in the valley of the river Dolaizon. It forms the South-West border of Le Puy-en-Velay and its highest point is Mount Ronzon (850 m).

== Population ==
Historical population
Year	Pop.	±% p.a.
1968	2,449	—
1975	3,070	+3.28%
1982	3,505	+1.91%
1990	3,426	−0.28%
1999	3,391	−0.11%
2007	3,534	+0.52%
2012	3,420	−0.65%
2017	3,396	−0.14%
2023	3,395	−0.00%
Source: INSEE

== Sights ==
- Augustinian Monastery early 17th century. Historic Monument.
- Church of Saint Vosy, chapel of the monastery. 17th century. Historic Monument.
- Chibottes or tsabones, circular stone huts built in the 19th century as shelters by winegrowers.

== Personalities ==
- Auguste Aymard, 1808–1889, mayor Vals-près-le-Puy, polymath (curator of the Crozatier museum, archivist, palaeontologist, archaeologist).
- Joseph Rumillet Charretier, 1833–1916, grew verbena (Fr: verveine) at his property in Vals and founded the distillery Verveine du Velay in 1858.

== International relations ==
The commune is twinned with Aielo de Malferit (Spain).

== See also ==
- Communes of the Haute-Loire department
