= Vernassal =

- Commune
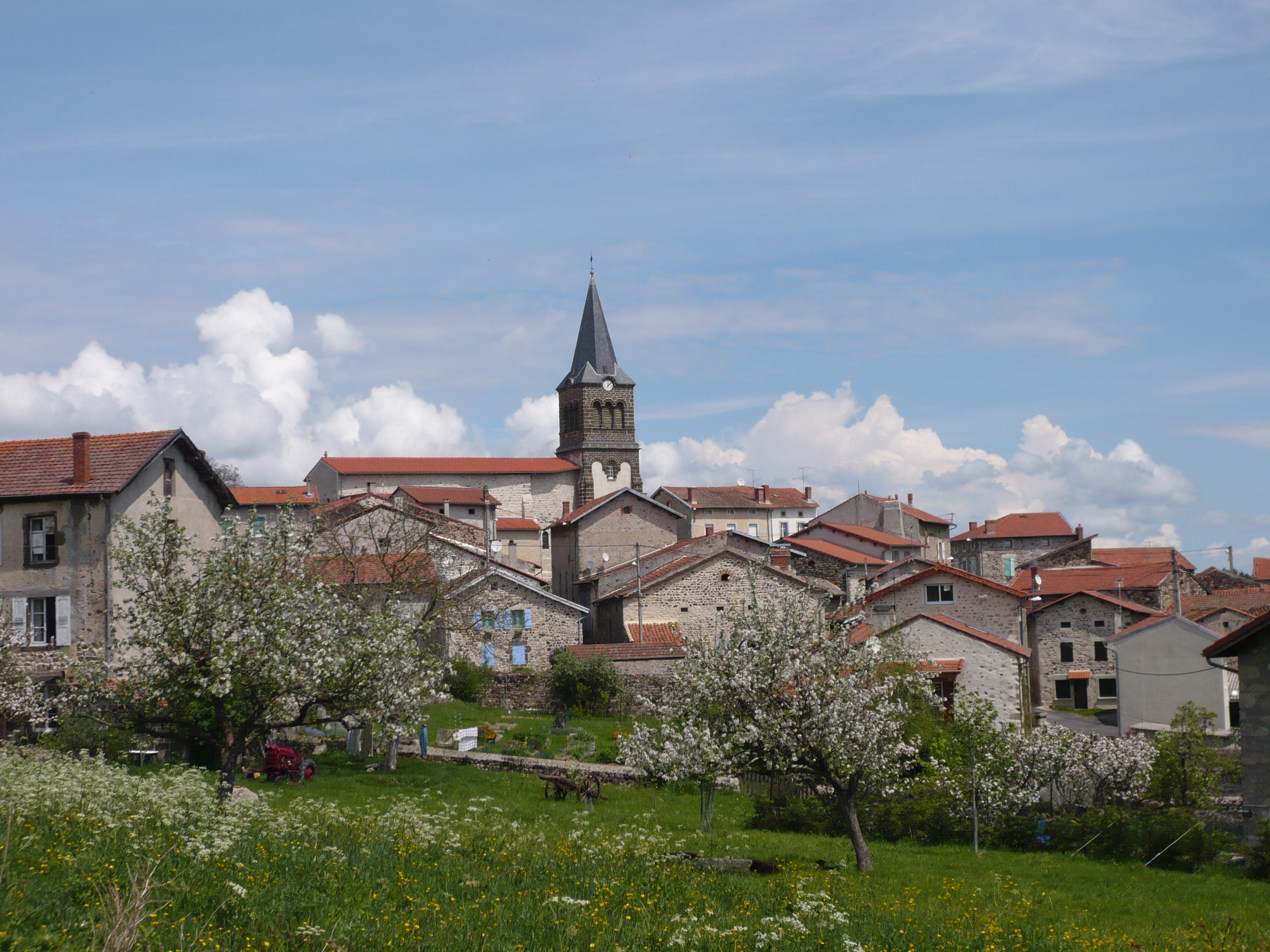
- Location of Vernassal
- Location within France Location within Auvergne-Rhône-Alpes
- Coordinates: 45°09′00″N 3°42′13″E
- Country: France
- Region: Auvergne-Rhône-Alpes
- Department: Haute-Loire
- Arrondissement: Le Puy-en-Velay
- Canton: Saint-Paulien
- Intercommunality: CA du Puy-en-Velay

Government
  - Mayor (2020–2026): Gilles Boyer
- Area^{1}: 19.23 km^{2} (7.42 sq mi)
- Elevation: 886 m (2,907 ft)
- Highest elevation: 1,163 m (3,816 ft)
- Lowest elevation: 850 m (2,790 ft)
- Population (2023): 373
  - Density: 19.4/km^{2} (50.2/sq mi)
- Time zone: UTC+01:00 (CET)
  - Summer (DST): UTC+02:00 (CEST)
- INSEE/Postal code: 43259 /43270
- ^{1} French Land Register data, which excludes lakes, ponds, glaciers > 1 km^{2} (0.386 sq mi or 247 acres) and river estuaries.

Vernassal (French pronunciation: [vɛʁnasal]) is a commune in the Haute-Loire department in south-central France.

== Population ==
Historical population
Year	Pop.	±% p.a.
1968	569	—
1975	430	−3.92%
1982	360	−2.51%
1990	314	−1.69%
1999	332	+0.62%
2007	373	+1.47%
2012	381	+0.43%
2017	355	−1.40%
2023	373	+0.83%
Source: INSEE

== See also ==
- Communes of the Haute-Loire department
