= Borne, Haute-Loire =

Borne
- Commune
- Location of Borne
- Location within France Location within Auvergne-Rhône-Alpes
- Coordinates: 45°06′03″N 3°47′59″E
- Country: France
- Region: Auvergne-Rhône-Alpes
- Department: Haute-Loire
- Arrondissement: Le Puy-en-Velay
- Canton: Saint-Paulien
- Intercommunality: CA du Puy-en-Velay

Government
  - Mayor (2020–2026): Annie Bouchet
- Area^{1}: 5.48 km^{2} (2.12 sq mi)
- Elevation: 745 m (2,444 ft)
- Highest elevation: 885 m (2,904 ft)
- Lowest elevation: 720 m (2,360 ft)
- Population (2023): 403
  - Density: 73.5/km^{2} (190/sq mi)
- Time zone: UTC+01:00 (CET)
  - Summer (DST): UTC+02:00 (CEST)
- INSEE/Postal code: 43036 /43350
- ^{1} French Land Register data, which excludes lakes, ponds, glaciers > 1 km^{2} (0.386 sq mi or 247 acres) and river estuaries.

Borne (French pronunciation: [bɔʁn]) is a commune in the Haute-Loire department in south-central France.

== Population ==
Historical population
Year	Pop.	±% p.a.
1968	275	—
1975	284	+0.46%
1982	271	−0.67%
1990	302	+1.36%
1999	352	+1.72%
2007	406	+1.80%
2012	424	+0.87%
2017	413	−0.52%
2023	403	−0.41%
Source: INSEE

== See also ==
- Communes of the Haute-Loire department
