= Velay =

Historical area of France

Coordinates: 45.04°N 3.89°E

County of Velay Comtat del Velai (in Occitan) Comté du Velay (in French)
- 1142–1790
- Coat of arms

- In red, the modern territory of Haute-Loire (most of it was former Velay) within France
- Capital: Le Puy-en-Velay
- Common languages: Occitan, French
- Religion: Roman Catholicism, Calvinism
- Government: Monarchy
- Historical era: Middle Ages
  - Established: 1142
  - Disestablished: 1790
Preceded by	Succeeded by
Duchy of Aquitaine	Kingdom of France
- Today part of: France

Velay (French pronunciation: [vəlɛ]) is a historical area of France situated in the east Haute-Loire département and southeast of Massif Central.

== History ==
Julius Caesar mentioned the vellavi as the subordinate of the arverni. Strabon suggested that they might have made secession from the arverni and Ptolemy located them as vellauni.

The country is well delimited by natural obstacles: Allier river in the south, Mount Boutières and Mézenc in the east, and Devès Massif in the west. Devès has Celtic toponyms clearly suggesting an antic border (Fix from finis; la Durande from Gaulish Equiranda meaning frontier).

No explanation concerning the toponym, except 19th century naïve scholastic ones that connected the name to PIE root wel (land of "well ... people") or even to the mythological Hel (“land or mountains of the hell” referring to the volcanic geology).

=== Middle Ages ===
In the early Middle Ages Velay was known as Pagus Vellaicus and was placed under the rule of the Duchy of Aquitaine, and followed the Auvergne destiny.

The first mention of a county of Velay was in 1142.

By the beginning of the 10th century, Le Puy-en-Velay had supplanted Ru-Essio (Saint-Paulien) as the religious and administrative capital of the Velay.

In 1162, Velay became an independent county, with its bishop as count reporting directly to the King.

Velay was divided into eighteen baronies. From the mid 14th century it was part of Languedoc but kept its own States General until 1789. During the same period, it was a crossroads of pilgrimage trails.

=== Modern period ===
At the beginning of the 16th century, Velay was wealthy, but the religious wars ruined the country. Le Puy was ardently catholic but the extreme south east of Velay was deeply Protestant. It is still nowadays the most Protestant area of France.

Velay ceased to exist after the French Revolution on March 4, 1790. The department of Haute-Loire was created from the former county of Velay, on top of it a portion of Auvergne, Gévaudan and Vivarais are added.

The first part of Travels with a Donkey in the Cévennes (1879) by Robert Louis Stevenson is entitled Velay, the country being the starting point of the writer's trip.

The name is kept for geographical terms (Mounts of the Velay) or new French geographical administrative entity (Communautés de communes du Velay).
