= Chaspuzac =

- Commune
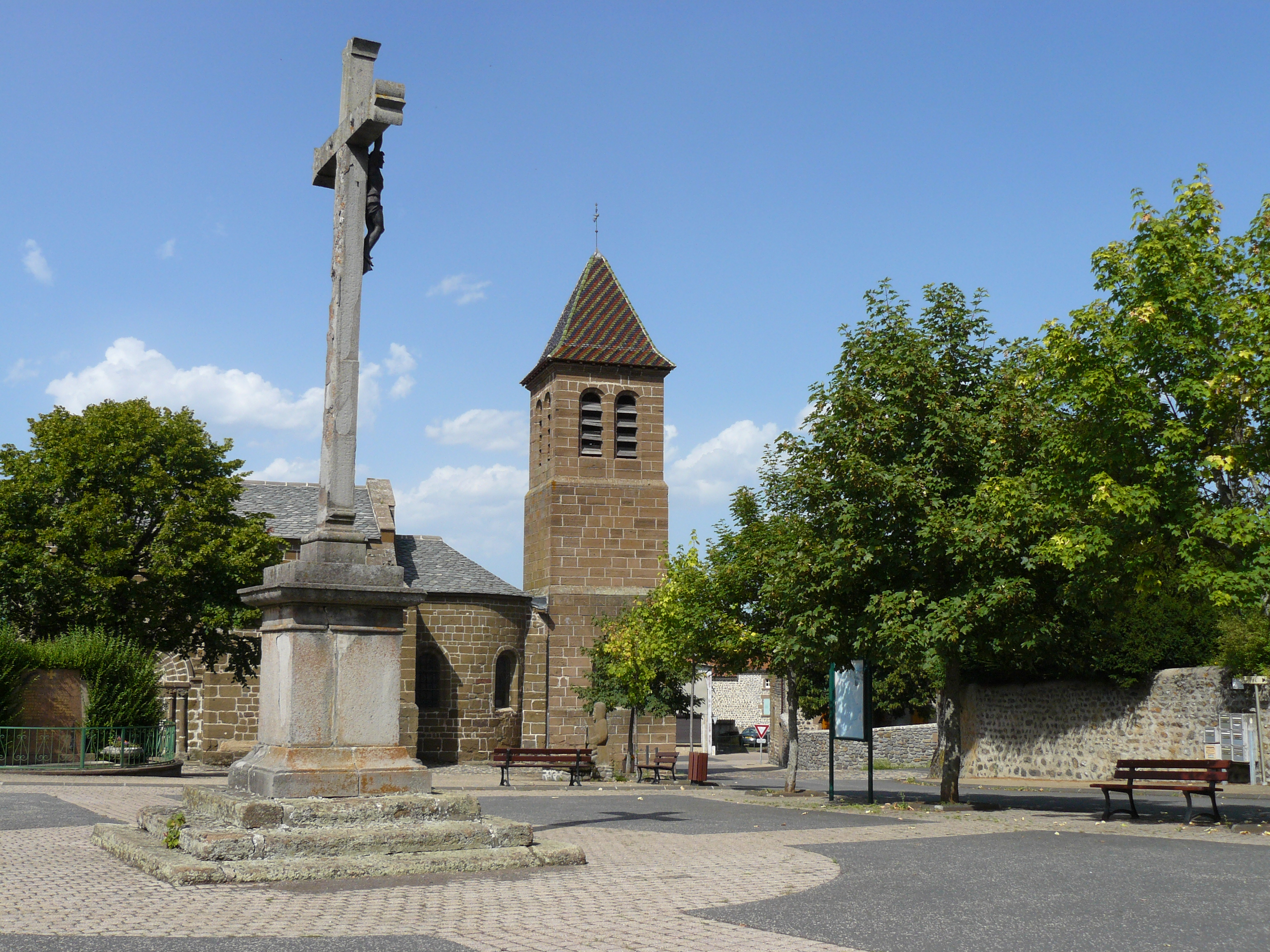
- Location of Chaspuzac
- Location within France Location within Auvergne-Rhône-Alpes
- Coordinates: 45°04′09″N 3°44′59″E
- Country: France
- Region: Auvergne-Rhône-Alpes
- Department: Haute-Loire
- Arrondissement: Le Puy-en-Velay
- Canton: Saint-Paulien
- Intercommunality: CA du Puy-en-Velay

Government
  - Mayor (2024–2026): Patrice Chamayou
- Area^{1}: 9.77 km^{2} (3.77 sq mi)
- Elevation: 869 m (2,851 ft)
- Highest elevation: 964 m (3,163 ft)
- Lowest elevation: 818 m (2,684 ft)
- Population (2023): 876
  - Density: 89.7/km^{2} (232/sq mi)
- Time zone: UTC+01:00 (CET)
  - Summer (DST): UTC+02:00 (CEST)
- INSEE/Postal code: 43062 /43320
- ^{1} French Land Register data, which excludes lakes, ponds, glaciers > 1 km^{2} (0.386 sq mi or 247 acres) and river estuaries.

Chaspuzac (French pronunciation: [ʃaspyzak]) is a commune in the Haute-Loire department in south-central France.

== Population ==
Historical population
Year	Pop.	±% p.a.
1968	326	—
1975	306	−0.90%
1982	338	+1.43%
1990	480	+4.48%
1999	521	+0.91%
2007	629	+2.38%
2012	714	+2.57%
2017	778	+1.73%
2023	876	+2.00%
Source: INSEE

== See also ==
- Communes of the Haute-Loire department
