= Bellevue-la-Montagne =

- Commune
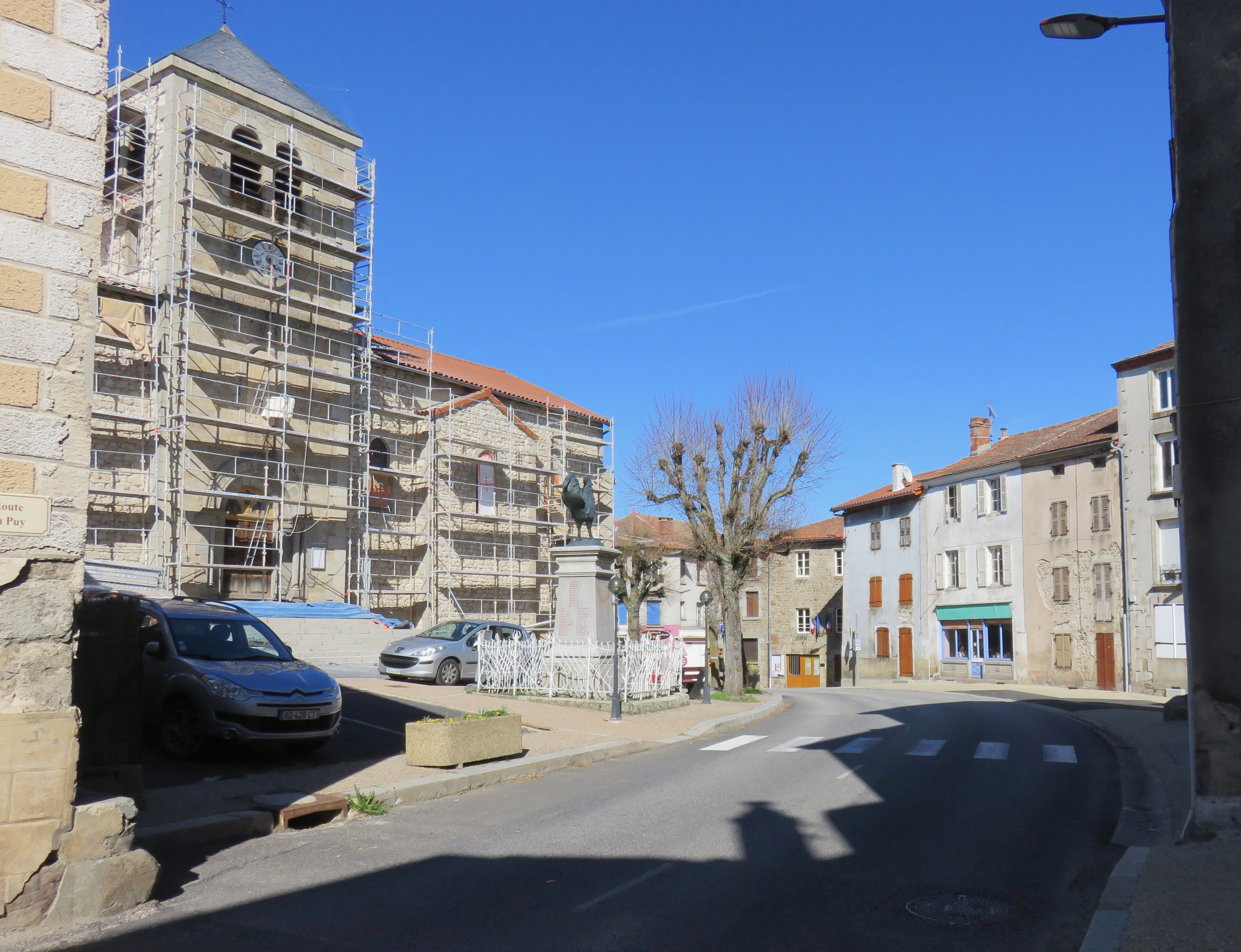
- Location of Bellevue-la-Montagne
- Location within France Location within Auvergne-Rhône-Alpes
- Coordinates: 45°13′18″N 3°49′15″E
- Country: France
- Region: Auvergne-Rhône-Alpes
- Department: Haute-Loire
- Arrondissement: Le Puy-en-Velay
- Canton: Saint-Paulien
- Intercommunality: CA du Puy-en-Velay

Government
  - Mayor (2020–2026): Michel Filère
- Area^{1}: 32.74 km^{2} (12.64 sq mi)
- Elevation: 990 m (3,250 ft)
- Highest elevation: 1,061 m (3,481 ft)
- Lowest elevation: 600 m (2,000 ft)
- Population (2023): 461
  - Density: 14.1/km^{2} (36.5/sq mi)
- Time zone: UTC+01:00 (CET)
  - Summer (DST): UTC+02:00 (CEST)
- INSEE/Postal code: 43026 /43350
- ^{1} French Land Register data, which excludes lakes, ponds, glaciers > 1 km^{2} (0.386 sq mi or 247 acres) and river estuaries.

Bellevue-la-Montagne (French pronunciation: [bɛlvy la mɔ̃taɲ]) is a commune in the Haute-Loire département in south-central France.

== Population ==
Historical population
Year	Pop.	±% p.a.
1968	687	—
1975	580	−2.39%
1982	521	−1.52%
1990	487	−0.84%
1999	479	−0.18%
2007	499	+0.51%
2012	454	−1.87%
2017	419	−1.59%
2023	461	+1.60%
Source: INSEE

== Personalities ==
- Guy Debord (Champot)

== See also ==
- Communes of the Haute-Loire department
