= Saint-Jean-de-Nay =

- Commune
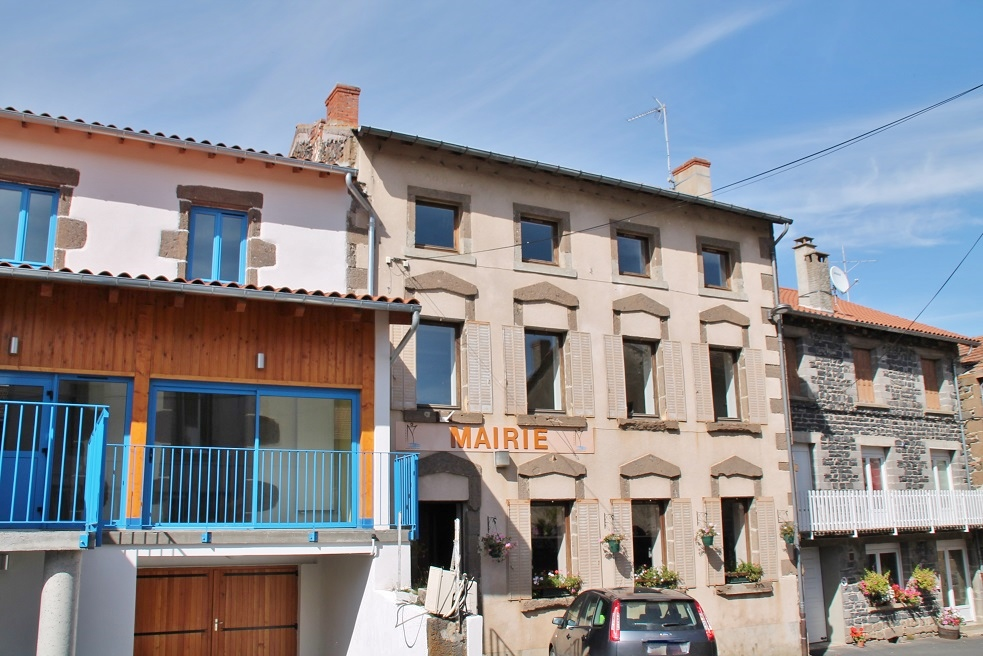
- Town hall
- Location of Saint-Jean-de-Nay
- Location within France Location within Auvergne-Rhône-Alpes
- Coordinates: 45°04′11″N 3°41′50″E
- Country: France
- Region: Auvergne-Rhône-Alpes
- Department: Haute-Loire
- Arrondissement: Le Puy-en-Velay
- Canton: Saint-Paulien
- Intercommunality: CA du Puy-en-Velay

Government
  - Mayor (2020–2026): Dominique Thollet
- Area^{1}: 28.26 km^{2} (10.91 sq mi)
- Elevation: 847 m (2,779 ft)
- Highest elevation: 1,301 m (4,268 ft)
- Lowest elevation: 868 m (2,848 ft)
- Population (2023): 337
  - Density: 11.9/km^{2} (30.9/sq mi)
- Time zone: UTC+01:00 (CET)
  - Summer (DST): UTC+02:00 (CEST)
- INSEE/Postal code: 43197 /43320
- ^{1} French Land Register data, which excludes lakes, ponds, glaciers > 1 km^{2} (0.386 sq mi or 247 acres) and river estuaries.

Saint-Jean-de-Nay (French pronunciation: [sɛ̃ ʒɑ̃ də nɛ]; Auvergnat: Sant Joan de Nai) is a commune in the Haute-Loire department in south-central France.

== Population ==
Historical population
Year	Pop.	±% p.a.
1968	662	—
1975	592	−1.58%
1982	524	−1.73%
1990	497	−0.66%
1999	430	−1.60%
2007	400	−0.90%
2012	374	−1.34%
2017	355	−1.04%
2023	337	−0.86%
Source: INSEE

== See also ==
- Communes of the Haute-Loire department
