= Sanssac-l'Église =

- Commune
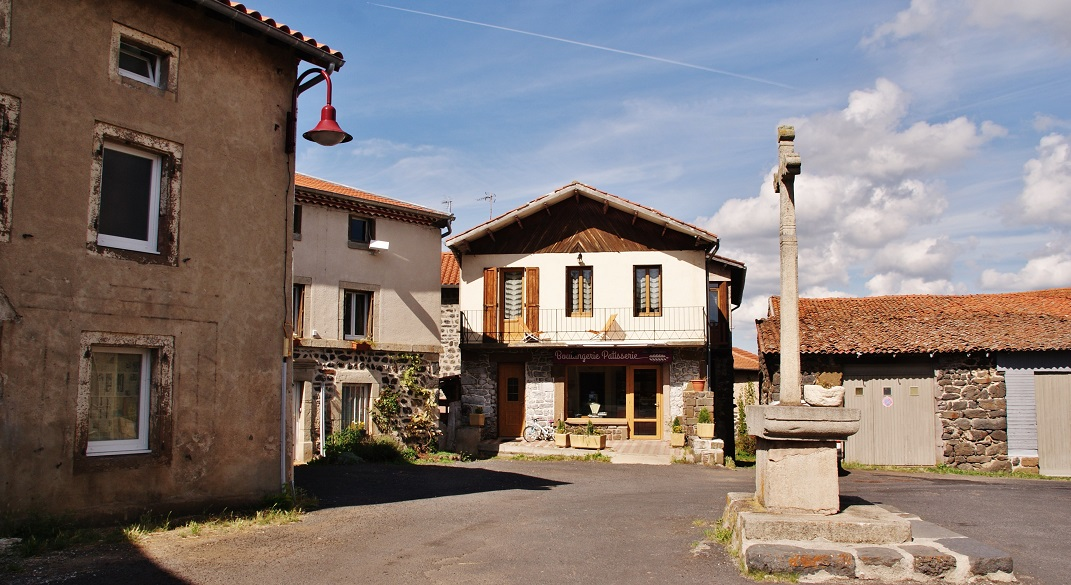
- Location of Sanssac-l'Église
- Location within France Location within Auvergne-Rhône-Alpes
- Coordinates: 45°03′09″N 3°46′47″E
- Country: France
- Region: Auvergne-Rhône-Alpes
- Department: Haute-Loire
- Arrondissement: Le Puy-en-Velay
- Canton: Saint-Paulien
- Intercommunality: CA du Puy-en-Velay

Government
  - Mayor (2020–2026): Jean-Yves Beraud
- Area^{1}: 15.28 km^{2} (5.90 sq mi)
- Elevation: 867 m (2,844 ft)
- Highest elevation: 964 m (3,163 ft)
- Lowest elevation: 660 m (2,170 ft)
- Population (2023): 1,080
  - Density: 70.7/km^{2} (183/sq mi)
- Time zone: UTC+01:00 (CET)
  - Summer (DST): UTC+02:00 (CEST)
- INSEE/Postal code: 43233 /43320
- ^{1} French Land Register data, which excludes lakes, ponds, glaciers > 1 km^{2} (0.386 sq mi or 247 acres) and river estuaries.

Sanssac-l'Église (French pronunciation: [sɑ̃sak leɡliz]) is a commune in the Haute-Loire department in south-central France.

== Population ==
Historical population
Year	Pop.	±% p.a.
1968	519	—
1975	536	+0.46%
1982	753	+4.98%
1990	837	+1.33%
1999	891	+0.70%
2007	1,004	+1.50%
2012	1,104	+1.92%
2017	1,116	+0.22%
2023	1,080	−0.55%
Source: INSEE

== See also ==
- Communes of the Haute-Loire department
