= Ceyssac =

- Commune
- Location of Ceyssac
- Location within France Location within Auvergne-Rhône-Alpes
- Coordinates: 45°02′19″N 3°50′11″E
- Country: France
- Region: Auvergne-Rhône-Alpes
- Department: Haute-Loire
- Arrondissement: Le Puy-en-Velay
- Canton: Le Puy-en-Velay-1
- Intercommunality: CA du Puy-en-Velay

Government
  - Mayor (2020–2026): Sandra Lombardy
- Area^{1}: 10.86 km^{2} (4.19 sq mi)
- Elevation: 705 m (2,313 ft)
- Highest elevation: 897 m (2,943 ft)
- Lowest elevation: 657 m (2,156 ft)
- Population (2023): 442
  - Density: 40.7/km^{2} (105/sq mi)
- Time zone: UTC+01:00 (CET)
  - Summer (DST): UTC+02:00 (CEST)
- INSEE/Postal code: 43045 /43000
- ^{1} French Land Register data, which excludes lakes, ponds, glaciers > 1 km^{2} (0.386 sq mi or 247 acres) and river estuaries.

Ceyssac (French pronunciation: [sesak]) is a commune in the Haute-Loire department of south-central France.

== Population ==
Historical population
Year	Pop.	±% p.a.
1968	286	—
1975	319	+1.57%
1982	372	+2.22%
1990	407	+1.13%
1999	405	−0.05%
2007	390	−0.47%
2012	401	+0.56%
2017	416	+0.74%
2023	442	+1.02%
Source: INSEE

== See also ==
- Communes of the Haute-Loire department
