= Monlet =

- Commune
- Location of Monlet
- Location within France Location within Auvergne-Rhône-Alpes
- Coordinates: 45°13′14″N 3°42′55″E
- Country: France
- Region: Auvergne-Rhône-Alpes
- Department: Haute-Loire
- Arrondissement: Le Puy-en-Velay
- Canton: Plateau du Haut-Velay granitique
- Intercommunality: CA du Puy-en-Velay

Government
  - Mayor (2024–2026): Philippe Ritter
- Area^{1}: 35.7 km^{2} (13.8 sq mi)
- Elevation: 1,022 m (3,353 ft)
- Highest elevation: 1,172 m (3,845 ft)
- Lowest elevation: 859 m (2,818 ft)
- Population (2023): 402
  - Density: 11.3/km^{2} (29.2/sq mi)
- Time zone: UTC+01:00 (CET)
  - Summer (DST): UTC+02:00 (CEST)
- INSEE/Postal code: 43138 /43270
- ^{1} French Land Register data, which excludes lakes, ponds, glaciers > 1 km^{2} (0.386 sq mi or 247 acres) and river estuaries.

Monlet (French pronunciation: [mɔ̃lɛ]) is a commune in the Haute-Loire department in south-central France.

== Population ==
Historical population
Year	Pop.	±% p.a.
1968	572	—
1975	511	−1.60%
1982	437	−2.21%
1990	399	−1.13%
1999	377	−0.63%
2007	411	+1.09%
2012	405	−0.29%
2017	420	+0.73%
2023	402	−0.73%
Source: INSEE

== See also ==
- Communes of the Haute-Loire department
