= Loudes =

- Commune
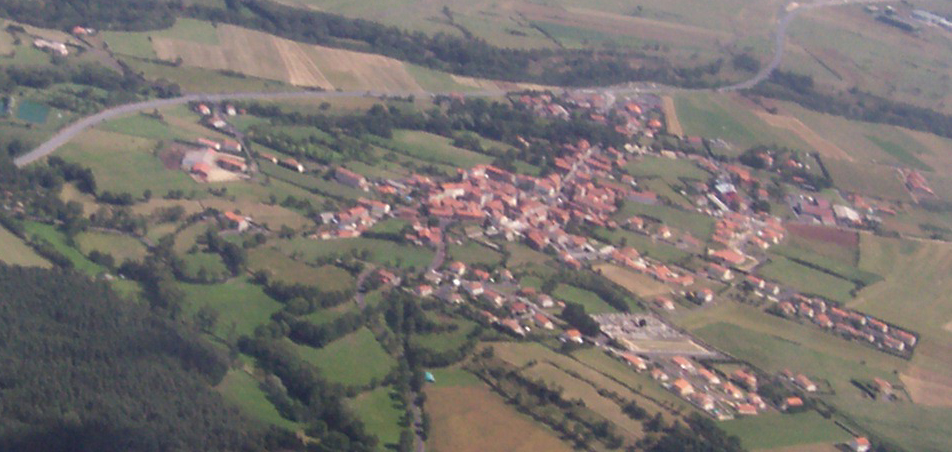

- Coat of arms
- Location of Loudes
- Location within France Location within Auvergne-Rhône-Alpes
- Coordinates: 45°05′20″N 3°44′58″E
- Country: France
- Region: Auvergne-Rhône-Alpes
- Department: Haute-Loire
- Arrondissement: Le Puy-en-Velay
- Canton: Saint-Paulien
- Intercommunality: CA du Puy-en-Velay

Government
  - Mayor (2020–2026): Laurent Barbalat
- Area^{1}: 24.33 km^{2} (9.39 sq mi)
- Elevation: 836 m (2,743 ft)
- Highest elevation: 1,042 m (3,419 ft)
- Lowest elevation: 759 m (2,490 ft)
- Population (2023): 944
  - Density: 38.8/km^{2} (100/sq mi)
- Time zone: UTC+01:00 (CET)
  - Summer (DST): UTC+02:00 (CEST)
- INSEE/Postal code: 43124 /43320
- ^{1} French Land Register data, which excludes lakes, ponds, glaciers > 1 km^{2} (0.386 sq mi or 247 acres) and river estuaries.

Loudes (French pronunciation: [lud]) is a commune in the Haute-Loire department in south-central France.

== Population ==
Historical population
Year	Pop.	±% p.a.
1968	823	—
1975	750	−1.32%
1982	731	−0.37%
1990	772	+0.68%
1999	804	+0.45%
2007	868	+0.96%
2012	882	+0.32%
2017	918	+0.80%
2023	944	+0.47%
Source: INSEE

== Climate ==
Climate data for Loudes (1991–2020 averages)
Month	Jan	Feb	Mar	Apr	May	Jun	Jul	Aug	Sep	Oct	Nov	Dec	Year
Record high °C (°F)	17.8 (64.0)	21.4 (70.5)	24.3 (75.7)	26.8 (80.2)	32.4 (90.3)	37.4 (99.3)	37.4 (99.3)	37.0 (98.6)	33.5 (92.3)	28.7 (83.7)	21.8 (71.2)	18.8 (65.8)	37.4 (99.3)
Mean daily maximum °C (°F)	5.4 (41.7)	6.6 (43.9)	10.6 (51.1)	13.4 (56.1)	17.4 (63.3)	21.7 (71.1)	24.4 (75.9)	24.4 (75.9)	19.7 (67.5)	15.0 (59.0)	9.2 (48.6)	6.1 (43.0)	14.5 (58.1)
Daily mean °C (°F)	1.4 (34.5)	1.9 (35.4)	5.1 (41.2)	7.7 (45.9)	11.5 (52.7)	15.4 (59.7)	17.7 (63.9)	17.5 (63.5)	13.5 (56.3)	10.0 (50.0)	5.0 (41.0)	2.2 (36.0)	9.1 (48.4)
Mean daily minimum °C (°F)	−2.6 (27.3)	−2.7 (27.1)	−0.3 (31.5)	2.1 (35.8)	5.7 (42.3)	9.1 (48.4)	10.9 (51.6)	10.6 (51.1)	7.4 (45.3)	5.0 (41.0)	0.9 (33.6)	−1.7 (28.9)	3.7 (38.7)
Record low °C (°F)	−23.2 (−9.8)	−20.8 (−5.4)	−22.0 (−7.6)	−10.2 (13.6)	−4.4 (24.1)	−1.3 (29.7)	1.8 (35.2)	−0.8 (30.6)	−2.5 (27.5)	−9.2 (15.4)	−13.4 (7.9)	−18.2 (−0.8)	−23.2 (−9.8)
Average precipitation mm (inches)	38.6 (1.52)	28.9 (1.14)	33.6 (1.32)	58.5 (2.30)	73.8 (2.91)	74.4 (2.93)	71.4 (2.81)	61.0 (2.40)	68.5 (2.70)	67.2 (2.65)	65.1 (2.56)	41.4 (1.63)	682.4 (26.87)
Average precipitation days (≥ 1.0 mm)	6.8	6.2	7.1	9.4	9.8	8.0	7.3	7.4	7.4	8.4	8.8	7.4	94.0
Mean monthly sunshine hours	88.8	111.8	167.8	171.4	194.5	225.3	263.5	244.8	184.8	128.3	87.8	83.0	1,951.7
Source: Meteociel

== See also ==
- Communes of the Haute-Loire department
- Le Puy - Loudes Airport
