= Blavozy =

- Commune
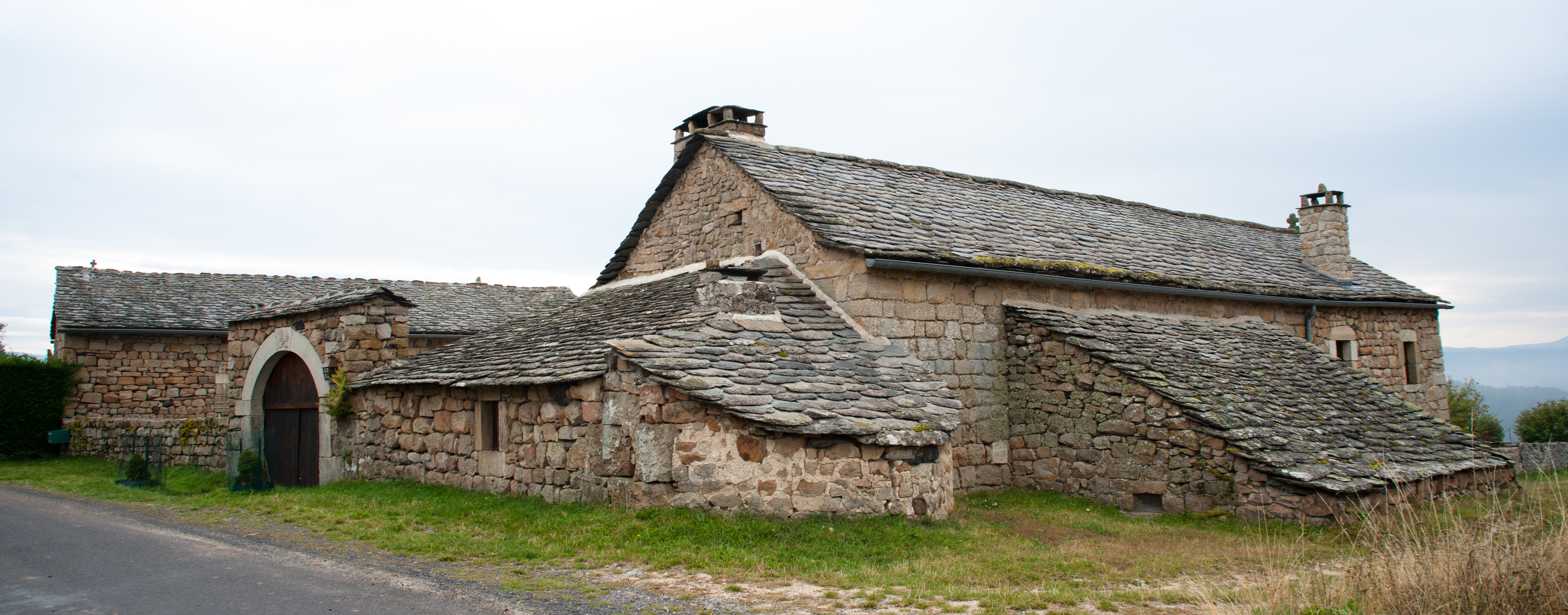
- Farm house
- Location of Blavozy
- Location within France Location within Auvergne-Rhône-Alpes
- Coordinates: 45°03′28″N 3°58′44″E
- Country: France
- Region: Auvergne-Rhône-Alpes
- Department: Haute-Loire
- Arrondissement: Le Puy-en-Velay
- Canton: Le Puy-en-Velay-3
- Intercommunality: CA du Puy-en-Velay

Government
  - Mayor (2020–2026): Franck Paillon
- Area^{1}: 6.38 km^{2} (2.46 sq mi)
- Elevation: 690 m (2,260 ft)
- Highest elevation: 871 m (2,858 ft)
- Lowest elevation: 634 m (2,080 ft)
- Population (2023): 1,724
  - Density: 270/km^{2} (700/sq mi)
- Time zone: UTC+01:00 (CET)
  - Summer (DST): UTC+02:00 (CEST)
- INSEE/Postal code: 43032 /43700
- ^{1} French Land Register data, which excludes lakes, ponds, glaciers > 1 km^{2} (0.386 sq mi or 247 acres) and river estuaries.

Blavozy (French pronunciation: [blavozi]; Occitan: Blavòsi) is a commune in the Haute-Loire department in south-central France.

== Population ==
Historical population
Year	Pop.	±% p.a.
1968	518	—
1975	684	+4.05%
1982	996	+5.52%
1990	1,163	+1.96%
1999	1,324	+1.45%
2007	1,549	+1.98%
2012	1,613	+0.81%
2017	1,656	+0.53%
2023	1,724	+0.67%
Source: INSEE

== See also ==
- Communes of the Haute-Loire department
