= Canton of Saint-Paulien =

Coordinates: 45.14°N 3.81°E

The canton of Saint-Paulien is an administrative division of the Haute-Loire department, south-central France. Its borders were modified at the French canton reorganisation which came into effect in March 2015. Its seat is in Saint-Paulien.

It consists of the following communes:

1. Bellevue-la-Montagne
2. Blanzac
3. Borne
4. Céaux-d'Allègre
5. Chaspuzac
6. Fix-Saint-Geneys
7. Lissac
8. Loudes
9. Saint-Geneys-près-Saint-Paulien
10. Saint-Jean-de-Nay
11. Saint-Paulien
12. Saint-Privat-d'Allier
13. Saint-Vidal
14. Sanssac-l'Église
15. Vazeilles-Limandre
16. Vergezac
17. Vernassal
18. Le Vernet
