= Lissac, Haute-Loire =

Lissac
- Commune
- Location of Lissac
- Location within France Location within Auvergne-Rhône-Alpes
- Coordinates: 45°08′01″N 3°46′05″E
- Country: France
- Region: Auvergne-Rhône-Alpes
- Department: Haute-Loire
- Arrondissement: Le Puy-en-Velay
- Canton: Saint-Paulien
- Intercommunality: CA du Puy-en-Velay

Government
  - Mayor (2020–2026): Gilbert Roux
- Area^{1}: 12.03 km^{2} (4.64 sq mi)
- Elevation: 835 m (2,740 ft)
- Highest elevation: 908 m (2,979 ft)
- Lowest elevation: 791 m (2,595 ft)
- Population (2023): 294
  - Density: 24.4/km^{2} (63.3/sq mi)
- Time zone: UTC+01:00 (CET)
  - Summer (DST): UTC+02:00 (CEST)
- INSEE/Postal code: 43122 /43350
- ^{1} French Land Register data, which excludes lakes, ponds, glaciers > 1 km^{2} (0.386 sq mi or 247 acres) and river estuaries.

Lissac (French pronunciation: [lisak]) is a commune in Haute-Loire department, France.

== Population ==
Historical population
| Year | Pop. | ±% p.a. |
|---|---|---|
| 1968 | 305 | — |
| 1975 | 278 | −1.32% |
| 1982 | 250 | −1.51% |
| 1990 | 228 | −1.14% |
| 1999 | 239 | +0.52% |
| 2007 | 259 | +1.01% |
| 2012 | 264 | +0.38% |
| 2017 | 275 | +0.82% |
| 2023 | 294 | +1.12% |
Source: INSEE

== See also ==
- Communes of the Haute-Loire department
