= Lavoûte-sur-Loire =

- Commune
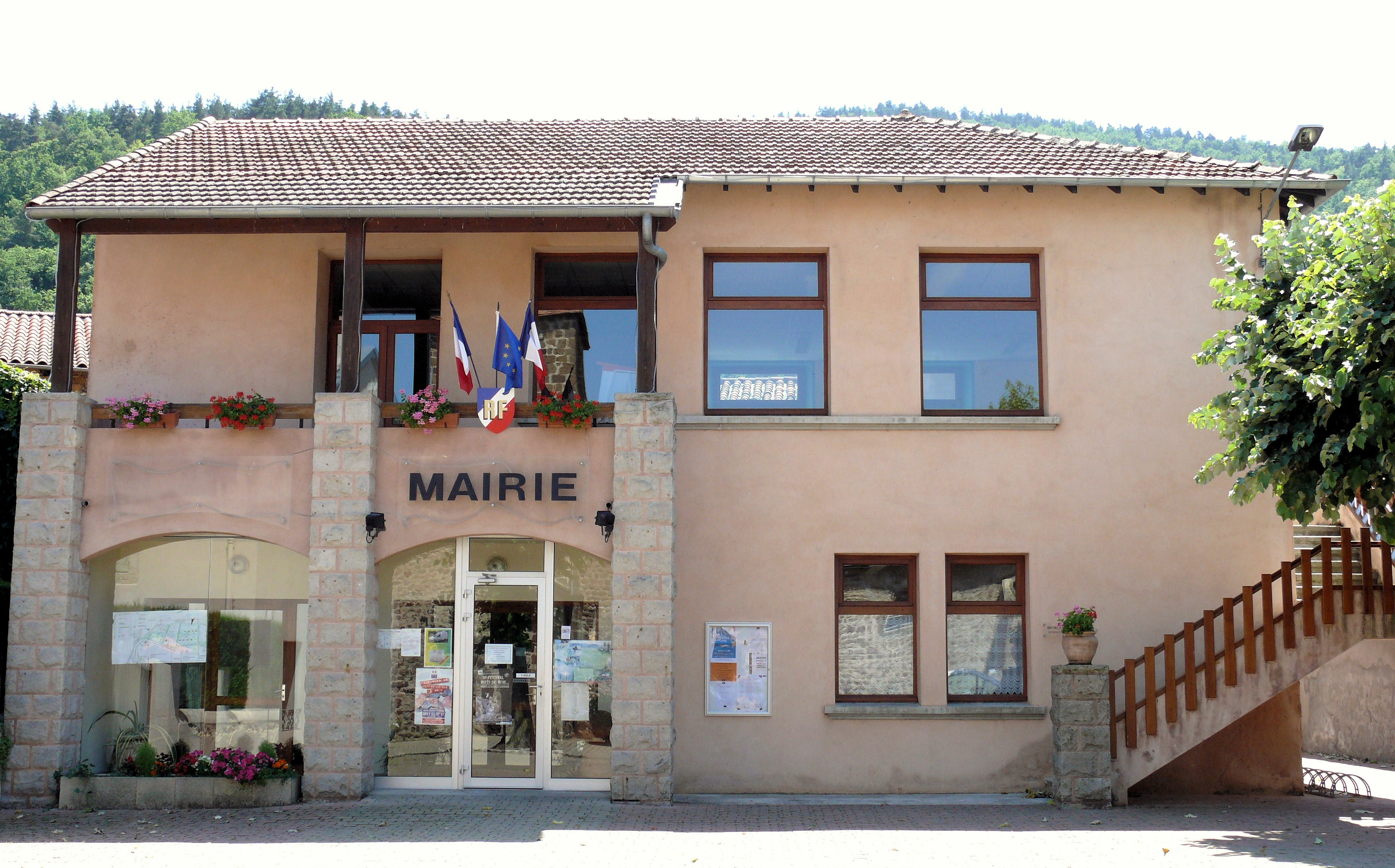
- Town hall
- Location of Lavoûte-sur-Loire
- Location within France Location within Auvergne-Rhône-Alpes
- Coordinates: 45°07′09″N 3°54′24″E
- Country: France
- Region: Auvergne-Rhône-Alpes
- Department: Haute-Loire
- Arrondissement: Le Puy-en-Velay
- Canton: Emblavez-et-Meygal
- Intercommunality: CA du Puy-en-Velay

Government
  - Mayor (2020–2026): Jean-Paul Beaumel
- Area^{1}: 10.16 km^{2} (3.92 sq mi)
- Elevation: 561 m (1,841 ft)
- Highest elevation: 900 m (3,000 ft)
- Lowest elevation: 554 m (1,818 ft)
- Population (2023): 805
  - Density: 79.2/km^{2} (205/sq mi)
- Time zone: UTC+01:00 (CET)
  - Summer (DST): UTC+02:00 (CEST)
- INSEE/Postal code: 43119 /43800
- ^{1} French Land Register data, which excludes lakes, ponds, glaciers > 1 km^{2} (0.386 sq mi or 247 acres) and river estuaries.

Lavoûte-sur-Loire (French pronunciation: [lavut syʁ lwaʁ], literally Lavoûte on Loire; Occitan: La Vòuta de Leir) is a commune in the Haute-Loire department in south-central France.

== Population ==
Historical population
Year	Pop.	±% p.a.
1968	514	—
1975	509	−0.14%
1982	614	+2.72%
1990	697	+1.60%
1999	687	−0.16%
2007	724	+0.66%
2012	830	+2.77%
2017	840	+0.24%
2023	805	−0.71%
Source: INSEE

== See also ==
- Communes of the Haute-Loire department
