= Espaly-Saint-Marcel =

- Commune
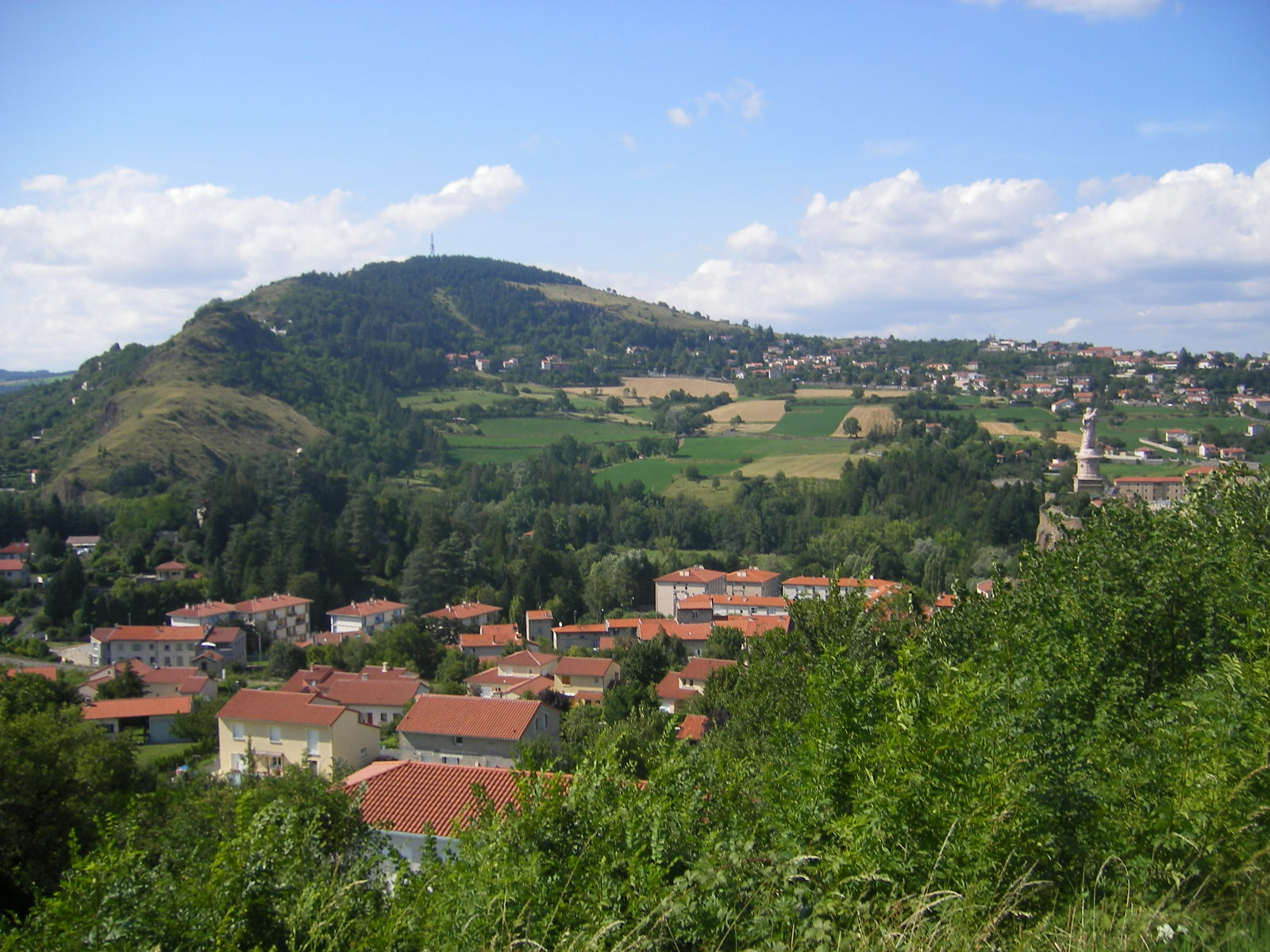

- Coat of arms
- Location of Espaly-Saint-Marcel
- Location within France Location within Auvergne-Rhône-Alpes
- Coordinates: 45°02′50″N 3°51′37″E
- Country: France
- Region: Auvergne-Rhône-Alpes
- Department: Haute-Loire
- Arrondissement: Le Puy-en-Velay
- Canton: Le Puy-en-Velay-1
- Intercommunality: CA du Puy-en-Velay

Government
  - Mayor (2020–2026): Christianne Mosnier
- Area^{1}: 6.29 km^{2} (2.43 sq mi)
- Elevation: 650 m (2,130 ft)
- Highest elevation: 892 m (2,927 ft)
- Lowest elevation: 618 m (2,028 ft)
- Population (2023): 3,585
  - Density: 570/km^{2} (1,480/sq mi)
- Demonym(s): Espaviot (masculine); Espaviote (feminine)
- Time zone: UTC+01:00 (CET)
  - Summer (DST): UTC+02:00 (CEST)
- INSEE/Postal code: 43089 /43000
- ^{1} French Land Register data, which excludes lakes, ponds, glaciers > 1 km^{2} (0.386 sq mi or 247 acres) and river estuaries.

Espaly-Saint-Marcel (French pronunciation: [ɛspali sɛ̃ maʁsɛl]) is a commune in the Haute-Loire department in south-central France.

== Population ==
Historical population

Year	Pop.	±% p.a.
1793	956	—
1821	1,036	+0.29%
1846	1,388	+1.18%
1872	1,991	+1.40%
1901	2,056	+0.11%
1926	2,235	+0.33%
1946	2,266	+0.07%
1962	2,775	+1.27%
1968	2,990	+1.25%

Year	Pop.	±% p.a.
1975	3,632	+2.82%
1982	3,516	−0.46%
1990	3,516	+0.00%
1999	3,552	+0.11%
2007	3,627	+0.26%
2012	3,511	−0.65%
2017	3,513	+0.01%
2023	3,585	+0.34%

Source: EHESS and INSEE (1968-2023)

== See also ==
- Communes of the Haute-Loire department
