= Saint-Paulien =

- Commune
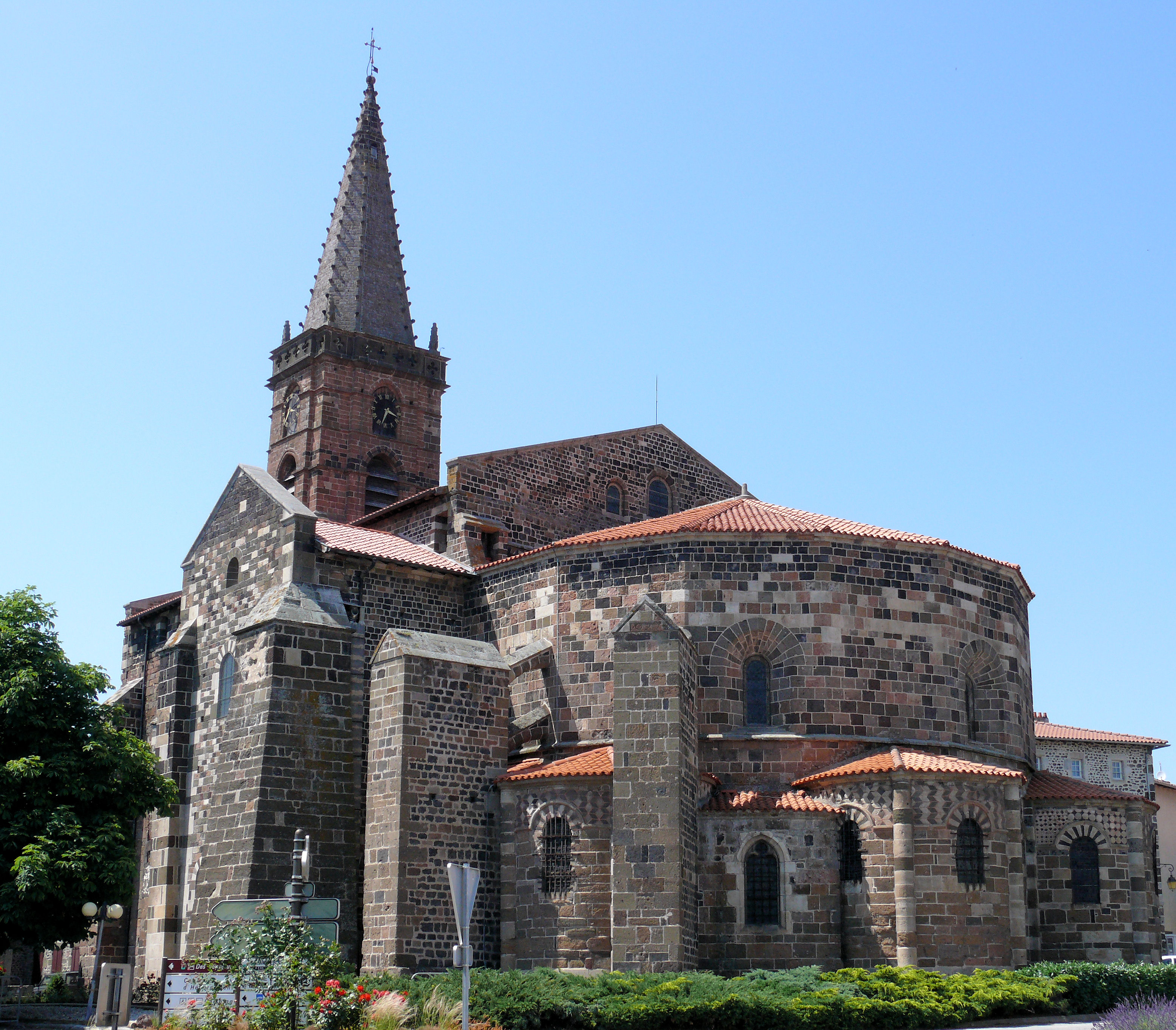

- Coat of arms
- Location of Saint-Paulien
- Location within France Location within Auvergne-Rhône-Alpes
- Coordinates: 45°08′14″N 3°48′49″E
- Country: France
- Region: Auvergne-Rhône-Alpes
- Department: Haute-Loire
- Arrondissement: Le Puy-en-Velay
- Canton: Saint-Paulien
- Intercommunality: CA du Puy-en-Velay

Government
  - Mayor (2020–2026): Marie-Pierre Vincent
- Area^{1}: 40.63 km^{2} (15.69 sq mi)
- Elevation: 793 m (2,602 ft)
- Highest elevation: 1,070 m (3,510 ft)
- Lowest elevation: 704 m (2,310 ft)
- Population (2023): 2,439
  - Density: 60.03/km^{2} (155.5/sq mi)
- Time zone: UTC+01:00 (CET)
  - Summer (DST): UTC+02:00 (CEST)
- INSEE/Postal code: 43216 /43350
- ^{1} French Land Register data, which excludes lakes, ponds, glaciers > 1 km^{2} (0.386 sq mi or 247 acres) and river estuaries.

Saint-Paulien (French pronunciation: [sɛ̃ poljɛ̃]; Auvergnat: Sant Pàulhan) is a commune in the Haute-Loire department in south-central France.

It is the ancient Ruessium or Civitas Vellavorum, city of the Vellavi. The Borne River (La Borne, ultimately a tributary of the Loire River) flows through the commune.

== Population ==
Historical population

Year	Pop.	±% p.a.
1793	1,963	—
1821	2,586	+0.99%
1846	3,148	+0.79%
1872	2,947	−0.25%
1901	2,696	−0.31%
1926	2,096	−1.00%
1946	1,793	−0.78%
1962	1,866	+0.25%
1968	1,736	−1.20%

Year	Pop.	±% p.a.
1975	1,620	−0.98%
1982	1,822	+1.69%
1990	1,872	+0.34%
1999	1,912	+0.24%
2007	2,254	+2.08%
2012	2,411	+1.36%
2017	2,416	+0.04%
2023	2,439	+0.16%

Source: EHESS and INSEE (1968-2023)

== See also ==
- Communes of the Haute-Loire department
