= Fin gras du Mézenc =

Protected meat type from the Mézenc massif in France

- Type: Meat
- Region or state: Mézenc Massif
- Associated cuisine: French cuisine
- Created by: Fin Gras du Mézenc Association
- Variations: It can vary depending on the cattle breed: Salers, Limousine, Charolaise and Aubrac.
- Other information: AOC - AOP labeled http://www.aoc-fin-gras-du-mezenc.com/

Fin Gras du Mézenc is an appellation of origin for a French cattle-breeding product. It is protected at European level by a AOP ("Appellation d'Origine Contrôlée").

Its origins lie in an old practice of the farmers along the Mézenc massif, consisting of slowly fattening rigorously selected heifers and steers in their cowsheds with natural hay, also carefully picked, hay mowed in the high meadows, in order to sell them at Easter fairs. Fin gras probably owes its unique character to the hay used, which comes from a very specific mountain flora that includes plants such as Meum ("cistre" in common usage), which perfumes the meat. In addition, the hay is carefully harvested, sorted and distributed according to age-old local know-how. The animals - steers over 30 months old and heifers over 24 months old from various suckler breeds or from crosses between suckler and dairy breeds - are marketed by local butchers and restaurateurs, mainly located in the Haute-Loire and Ardèche regions.

The determination of farmers and elected representatives to preserve this tradition led, in 1994, to the creation of a scope statement including specifications with the aim of obtaining an AOC, which became a reality in 2006. The aim was to revitalize the region and preserve the intangible heritage of Mézencole agriculture.

This agricultural product is an integral part of the Mézenc culture, and helps to consolidate the coherence of this territory. As a result, a museum has been created to describe this agricultural product to tourists, and a Rural Excellence Project ("Pôle d'excellence Rurale") has been based since 2007 on the momentum created by the AOC recognition.

== History ==
=== Origins ===
Fin gras du Mézenc is produced on the Mézenc massif, which rises to an average altitude of 1,100 meters. Located in the Haute-Loire and Ardèche départements, this massif also marks the boundary between the Loire basin, which flows into the Atlantic Ocean, and the Rhône basin, which flows into the Mediterranean Sea. The Loire also flows through this massif, at Mont Gerbier de Jonc.

From the 17th century onwards, the massif's farmland, often owned by nobles or religious communities, was farmed by local farmers or rented out to transhumant herds from Southern France. The lack of land for cultivation became more and more of a problem as the population grew, and the rent brought in by the herders was not sufficient. It was probably for these reasons that the intensification of work around hay to compensate for the lack of grazing developed in the Mézenc, giving rise to the fin gras.

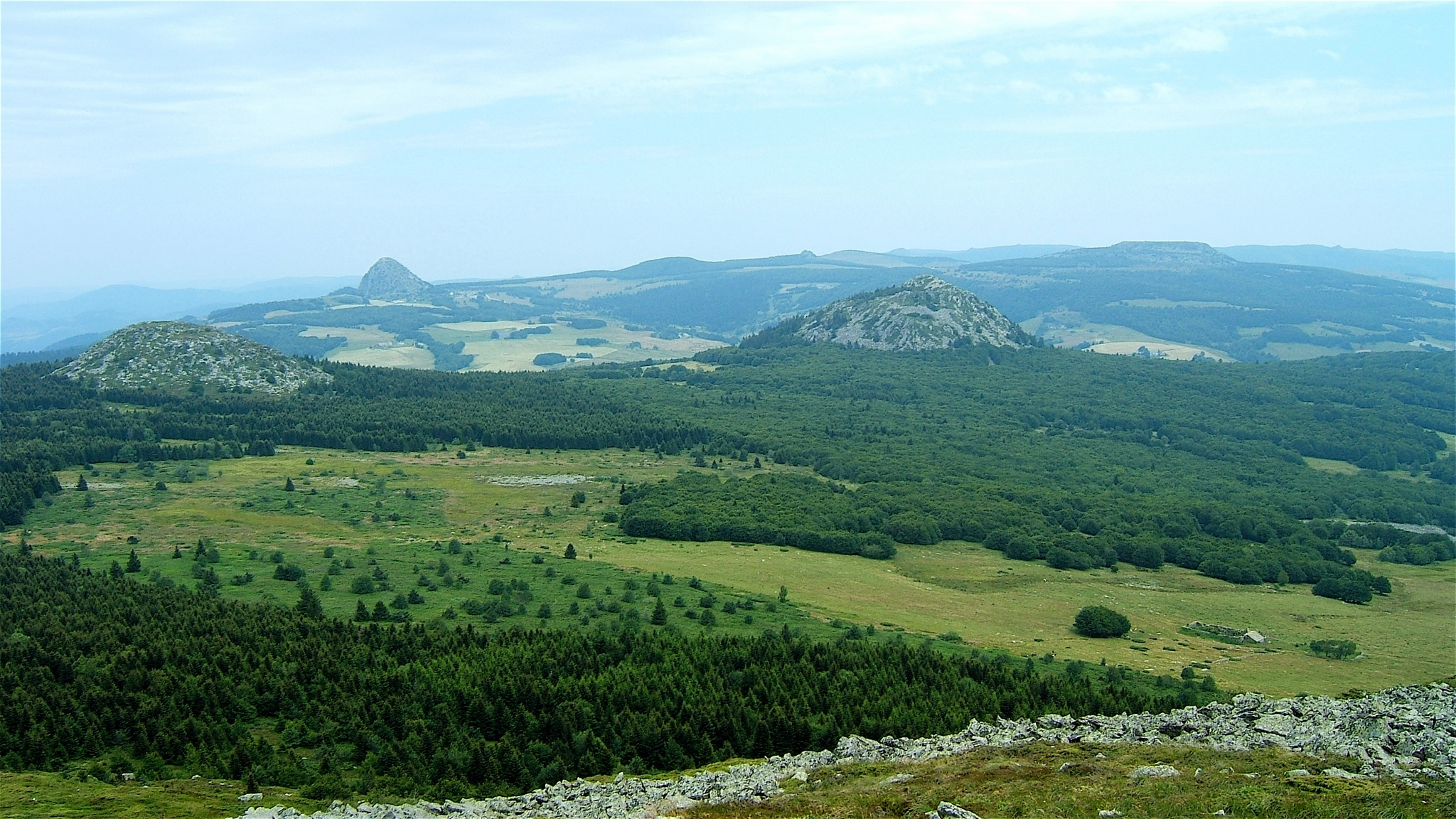
Landscape of the Mézenc massif.

The production of bœufs gras at Easter is a very old tradition in this massif. In 1680, the inventory of a wealthy farmer mentions his recipe for selling bœufs gras at Easter. Moreover, in 1760, the massif's breeders asked the authorities to build roads to enable them to sell their fattened animals at the Fay-sur-Lignon and Saint-Agrève fairs, the main outlets for their production. Manuscripts mention trade relations with the towns of Saint-Étienne, Lyon, Avignon, Marseille, and Montpellier. By 1724, Mézenc farmers were also supplying butchers in Valence, Crest, and Montélimar.

These oxen, generally aged between 12 and 15 years and too old for ploughing, were fattened all winter with unlimited hay before being sold at Easter. Their production became widespread in the 18th century. The quality of the hay was an essential factor in the success of this type of fattening, which is why the finest hay was set aside for distribution to the fattening animals. Numerous authors have praised the particular quality of this hay, such as Giraud-Soulavie as early as the end of the eighteenth century:

"The quality of the hay in these mountains is very suitable for fertilizing animals; the meadows nourish many aromatic plants, the grass is loose and fine; it never grows very high; this hay is carted into the barns with sledges that the oxen tread and carry up to the roof of the barn; and when this hay has fermented, it forms nothing more than a mass that is cut with an axe. Take some of this hay, make an infusion of it, and you'll have a very fragrant Eau vulnéraire, and much healthier than all those decoctions that starve the stomach."

Most of the animals used for this production were oxen that were too old for ploughing and belonged to the mézine breed, dominant on the massif at the time. This breed had a great aptitude for depositing the marbled intramuscular fat characteristic of fine fat. It has been extinct since 1978. In addition to locally raised beef, farmers also bought Aubrac cattle from the Laguiole region to fatten in the Mézenc.

The term "fin gras" ("fine fat") to designate the finely marbled meat produced in the Mézenc was used from the 19th century onwards by certain zootechnicians. At the time, however, the term did not find its way into everyday farming parlance, where it was more commonly referred to as "bœuf de Pâques" (Easter beef). The term became popular in the countryside much later, with the AOC recognition.

=== AOC recognition ===
Recognition of this long-standing tradition was sought in 1995, when the area was awarded the AOC (Appellation d'Origine Contrôlée) label. The AOC guarantees consumers a link between an agricultural product and its associated terroir, in this case, the Mézenc massif. This notion of terroir encompasses both natural conditions such as climate, soils, and the flora that grows there; along with human dimensions, through the know-how and traditions that have been developed in this region. So it's more the specificity of the product that is claimed than a superior quality as in the case of a red label. To become official, an AOC must be approved by the Institut national de l'origine et de la qualité (INAO), and it is then necessary to prove, sometimes scientifically, the link between the terroir and the agricultural product in question. Finally, the AOC is the subject of a decree proposed by the INAO, which sets out all the specifications to be respected by the various players in the sector (production zone, practices, feed, breeds, etc.).

The AOC initiative was born in the 1990s out of a desire to revitalize the region's agriculture, which was suffering from a decline in the number of farmers, and consequently in local demographics, since agriculture is the region's main activity. The traditional production of fin gras was quickly identified as a tradition common to the Mézenc, and one that could become a unifying element for the region. So, in 1995, the Association des élus du Mézenc, now the Association Mézenc-Gerbier, brought together local Mézenc elected officials from the two administrative regions concerned, to set up a development project for the area, one of whose first objectives was to gain recognition for fin gras as an AOC. Initial tests were carried out between November 1995 and March 1996 on 150 animals, with the participation of INRA Theix and the two Regional Chambers of Agriculture. In 1996, a group of breeders set up the Fin Gras du Mézenc association. This association is responsible for supporting the project. In 1997, the dossier requesting recognition of the "Fin Gras du Mézenc" appellation as an AOC was submitted to the INAO. Between 1997 and 2001, various steps were taken to demonstrate the product's specificity, in which INRA took part in collaboration with the Association pour le développement de l'institut de la viande (ADIV) to characterize the meat's organoleptic properties. The specifications were refined between 2002 and 2005, before the INAO finally validated the project by passing the decree on March 27, 2006. The decree was published in the Journal Officiel on September 2, 2006.

== Product ==
=== Mézenc hay, the source of the product's distinctiveness ===
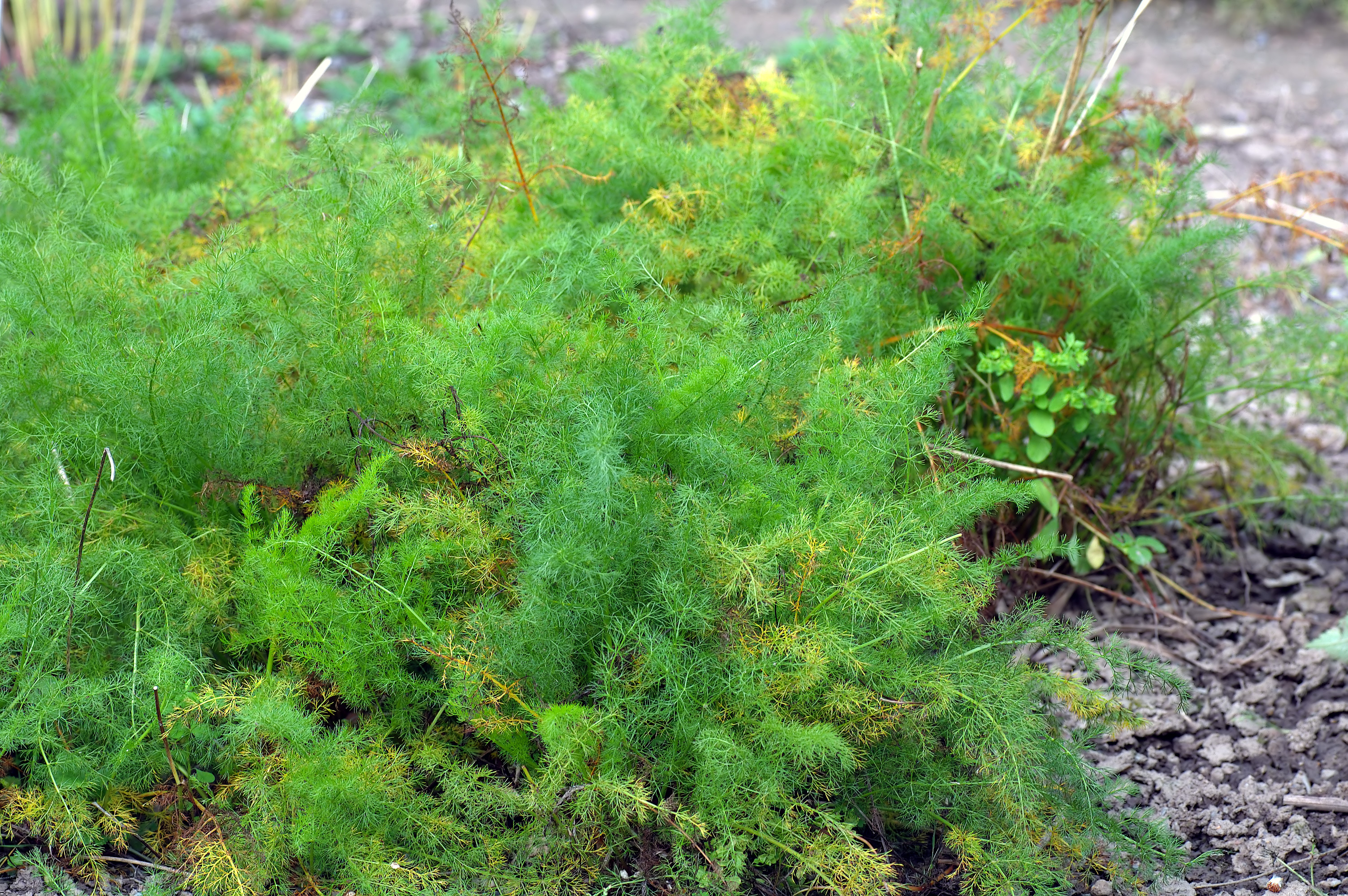
Meum or cistre, one of the plants that makes Mézenc hay so distinctive.

The Mézenc massif has a rich tradition of haymaking and hay-drying on meadows, following in the footsteps of the other Massif Central mountain ranges. The combination of altitude, soil, and climate makes it possible to mow and dry hay. A distinctive flora has developed in these regularly mown high-altitude meadows. There are 68 plant species, including numerous Poaceae such as Alopecurus, triset, Festuca, bentgrass, and sweet vernal grass; a significant proportion of Fabaceae such as clover and trefoil, and various plants characteristic of high-altitude meadows such as Meum, Viola, bistort, and broadleaf bluegrass. Mézenc hay owes its quality to the good forage quality of the species used in its composition, to the presence of particularly palatable plants such as Alpine fennel or Lady's mantle, to the high proportion of Fabaceae, and to the many medicinal plants (nearly 40) it contains, which may facilitate assimilation.

Meum, commonly known in this country as "cistre", is of particular importance. "Meat grass", as some farmers call it, is not eaten by animals when it is green in the pasture, but once dried it becomes very palatable and the animals eat a large quantity of the scented hay. As it is almost exclusively mown in the Mézenc, only animals from this region regularly consume it. It has been noted that the terpene composition of cistre, which gives it its fragrant properties, is close to that of Mézenc hay. What's more, a number of these terpenes are also found in the fat tissue of animals fed on this hay, linking the Mézenc terroir to the meat produced there.

The hay produced in Mézenc requires special attention because of its importance for the production of fattened livestock. That's why the region's livestock farmers pay particular attention to the quality of their hay meadows and to good harvesting and drying conditions, selecting the hay when it is distributed to the animals. The hay produced is easy to digest and has a good energy density of 0.7 forage units (FU) per kilogram of dry matter. The high proportion of Fabaceae results in a high nitrogen content, and a balanced forage from this point of view for the animals, with just over 100 PDI (digestible intestinal proteins) per UF. These values are higher than those obtained with most other mountain hays.

=== A particularly marbled meat ===
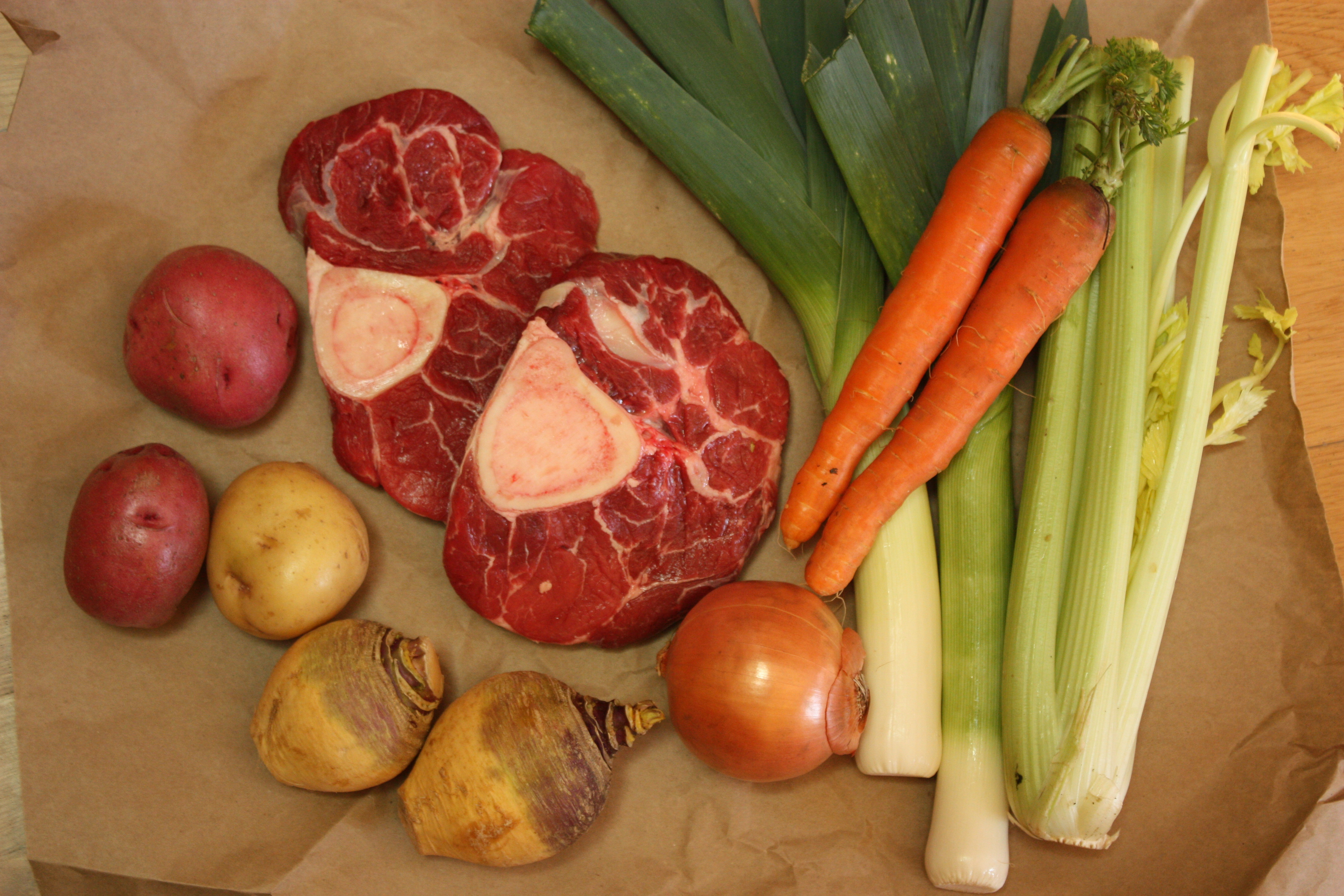
Pot-au-feu with vegetables and Mézenc fin gras

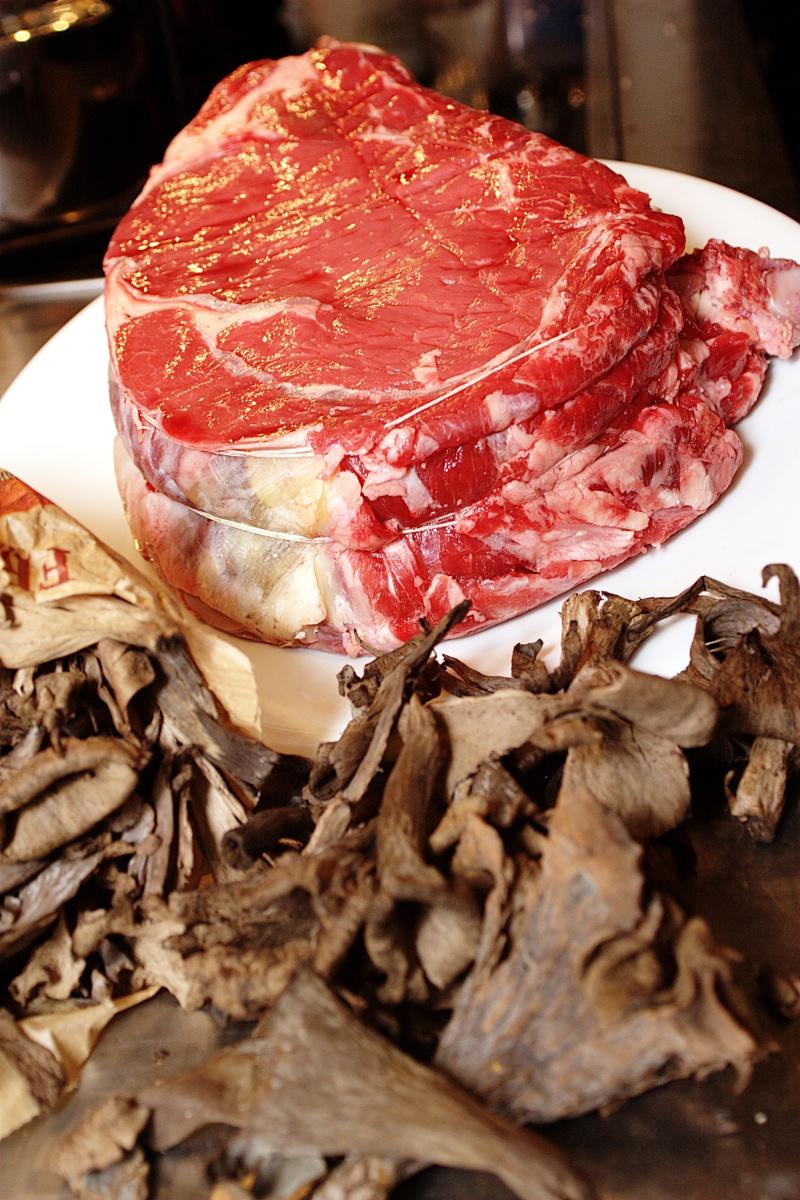
Slice of Fine Gras du Mézenc

The meat produced weighs a minimum of 280 kg for heifers and 320 kg for steers. They feature a thin layer of white to creamy-white fat. The meat is red to purple in color. Tender to very tender, with fine marbling. It is a seasonal agricultural product, marketed from March to June.

Studies have been carried out to characterize the organoleptic properties of Mézenc fin gras meat. The Association pour le Développement de l'Institut des Viandes (ADIV), for example, has determined that in terms of tenderness, but above all taste and color, fin gras stands out from other meats taken as reference. Other taste tests have shown that it is the pot au feu that best displays the characteristics of fin gras meat, thanks to its gentle cooking and the absence of side dishes. It is the "animal" (tawny) aromatic note that best characterizes this meat. Grilled and braised meats, on the other hand, are much less distinguishable from other meats.

This particular agricultural product is well valued by farmers, who sell their animals for an average of €4.55 per kilogram of carcass in 2007, i.e. 30% more than outside the AOC. In fact, this price is on the rise, with an increase of 6% in 2007.

== Breeding and specifications ==
=== Area of production ===
Communes selected for the AOC

The AOC Fin Gras du Mézenc production zone covers 28 communes in the Mézenc massif, 14 of them entirely (Les Vastres, Saint-Clément, La Rochette, Borée, Lachamp-Raphaël, Sagnes-et-Goudoulet, Sainte-Eulalie, Fay-sur-Lignon, Chaudeyrolles, Freycenet-la-Tour, Freycenet-la-Cuche, Moudeyres, Les Estables and Le Béage) and 14 partially (Mazet-Saint-Voy, Araules, Champclause, Montusclat, Saint-Front, Laussonne, Monastier-sur-Gazeille, Présailles, Issarlès, Le Lac-d'Issarlès, Cros-de-Géorand, Usclades-et-Rieutord, Saint-Andéol-de-Fourchades and Saint-Martial).

These communes have been split up for various reasons. In particular, low-lying plains in valleys (less than 1,100 m), areas beyond the basaltic flows of the Mézenc, the wooded areas of the Meygal, and areas whose geology differs from the basalt of the Mézenc were excluded. This zone lies between the AOC Le Puy green lentil zone and the AOC chestnut zone of Ardèche, but does not overlap with either of these zones. The abattoir area is slightly larger, and includes the abbatoirs of Privas, Aubenas, Lamastre, Annonay, Langogne, Romans, Valence, Yssingeaux, and Le Puy-en-Velay.

=== Animals ===
Label-eligible animals are heifers aged no less than 24 months and castrated males aged no less than 30 months, raised in the above-mentioned communes. In the past, the bœufs gras produced in the Mézenc belonged to the mézine breed, a local breed that disappeared in the 1960s. But the particularity of the production comes more from the flora of the Mézenc and its hay rather than from the animals, and today most animals of meat or mixed breeds are accepted. For example, the specifications stipulate that animals used for fattening can belong to the Aubrac, Charolais, Limousin and Salers cattle breeds. Animals resulting from crosses between these breeds and crosses between a female Abondance or Montbéliarde and a Limousin or Charolais male are also authorized. Culard-type animals are not accepted by the AOC.

In 2007, the average age of the animals was 33 months, with an estimated carcass weight of 379 kg, two-thirds of which were classified R on the EUROP grid.

=== Upbringing specifications ===
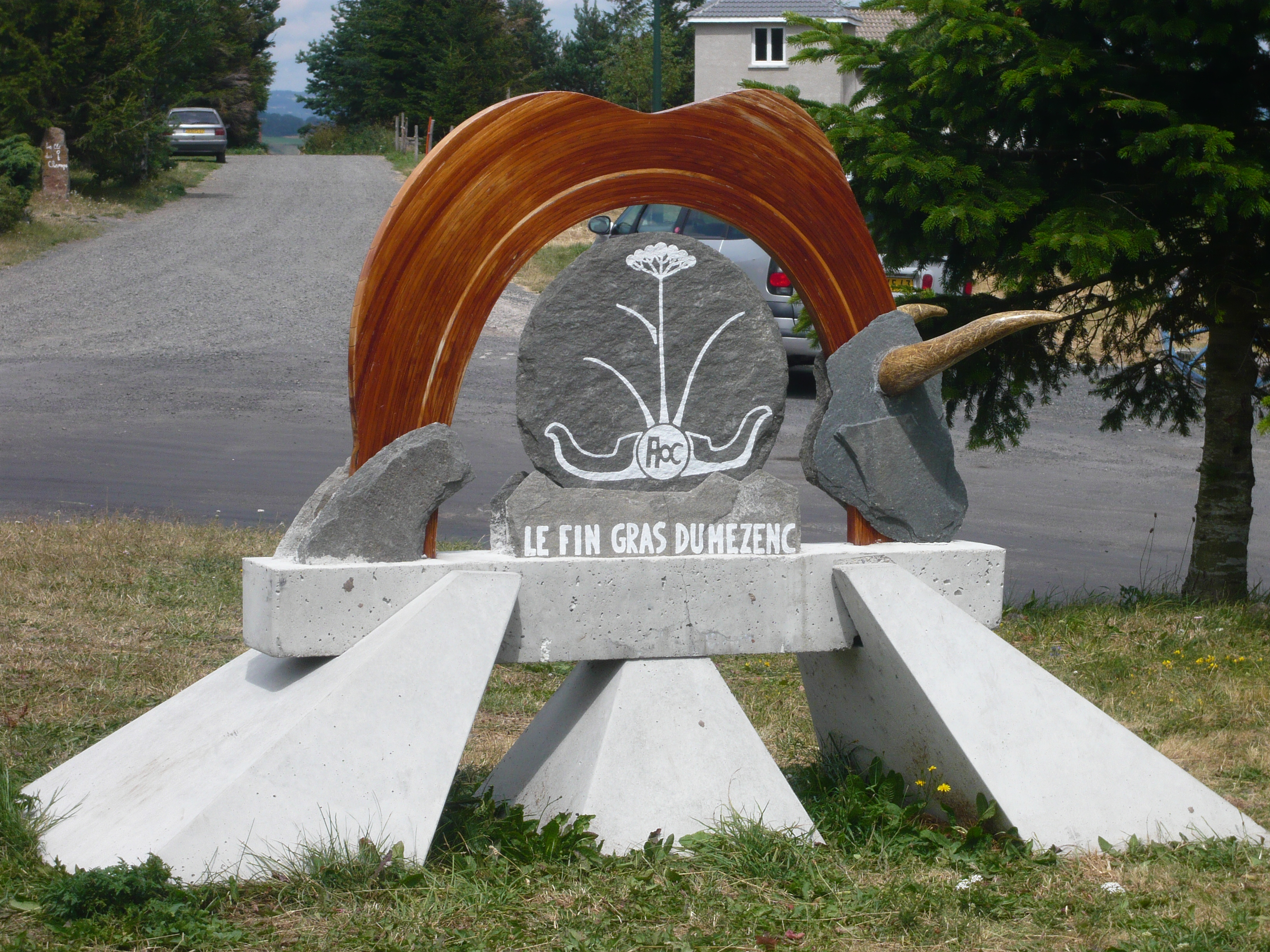
Advertising support for the appellation at Saint-Clément (Ardèche)

The animals fattened to produce fin gras come from both suckler and dairy farms, in similar proportions. Meat production on dairy farms is made possible by cross-breeding practices that are well established in the region. As a result, it's not uncommon for some very good crossbred animals to be fattened for fin gras.

One of the first stages in the production of fin gras after the birth of the animals is their selection. This is based on different criteria, depending on whether the farm is dedicated to meat or milk production. On suckler farms, males are selected according to their build at an early stage, as they are usually sold young as grazers, and males that are not kept should not remain on the farm for too long, at the risk of losing their value. Moreover, males should be castrated no later than 15 months of age. Heifers can be selected later. In general, selection takes place after the second wintering, before breeding. Here again, the animals' physical conformation is of prime importance. On dairy farms, calvings are often spread throughout the year, whereas on suckler farms, they are grouped together over the winter. The first sorting criterion is the age of the animals when they leave the barn, which must correspond to the criteria set for commercialization (just over 24 months for females and just over 30 months for males). The breeder's choice is ratified by the association's commission, which carries out checks on the selected animals to guarantee production quality.

The animals are raised consecutively in the meadow in summer, from June 21 to September 21 at least, and in the barn in winter, from November 30 to March 30 at least. The animals return for fattening before November 1. The fattening period lasts a minimum of 110 days, after which the animal can be finally slaughtered. During the winter, the animals are either tethered in the barn, or in animal stall. They are then kept on the feed fence for some time, due to the special feeding practices they undergo.

Certain feeding conditions must also be respected. These include a maximum stocking density of 1.4 UGB ("Unité de Gros Bétail") per hectare of forage area, and at least 0.7 ha of mown or grazed land for each animal qualifying for the label.

=== Feeding ===
During their breeding period, the animals are fed in summer on natural pastures and the regain from hay meadows, and in winter on hay, which is distributed as much as they want. Both the pastures and the meadows from which the hay comes must be located in the AOC production zone. Protein and energy supplements may also be provided. Silage is prohibited throughout the production process, as are transgenic plants and growth promoters.

Meadows must have been planted at least ten years prior to use, and fertilized at least once every three years with organic fertilizers (manure, slurry or liquid manure), with mineral fertilization not to exceed 30 units per hectare per year. Only freshly mown hay may be used. It must be meadow-dried.

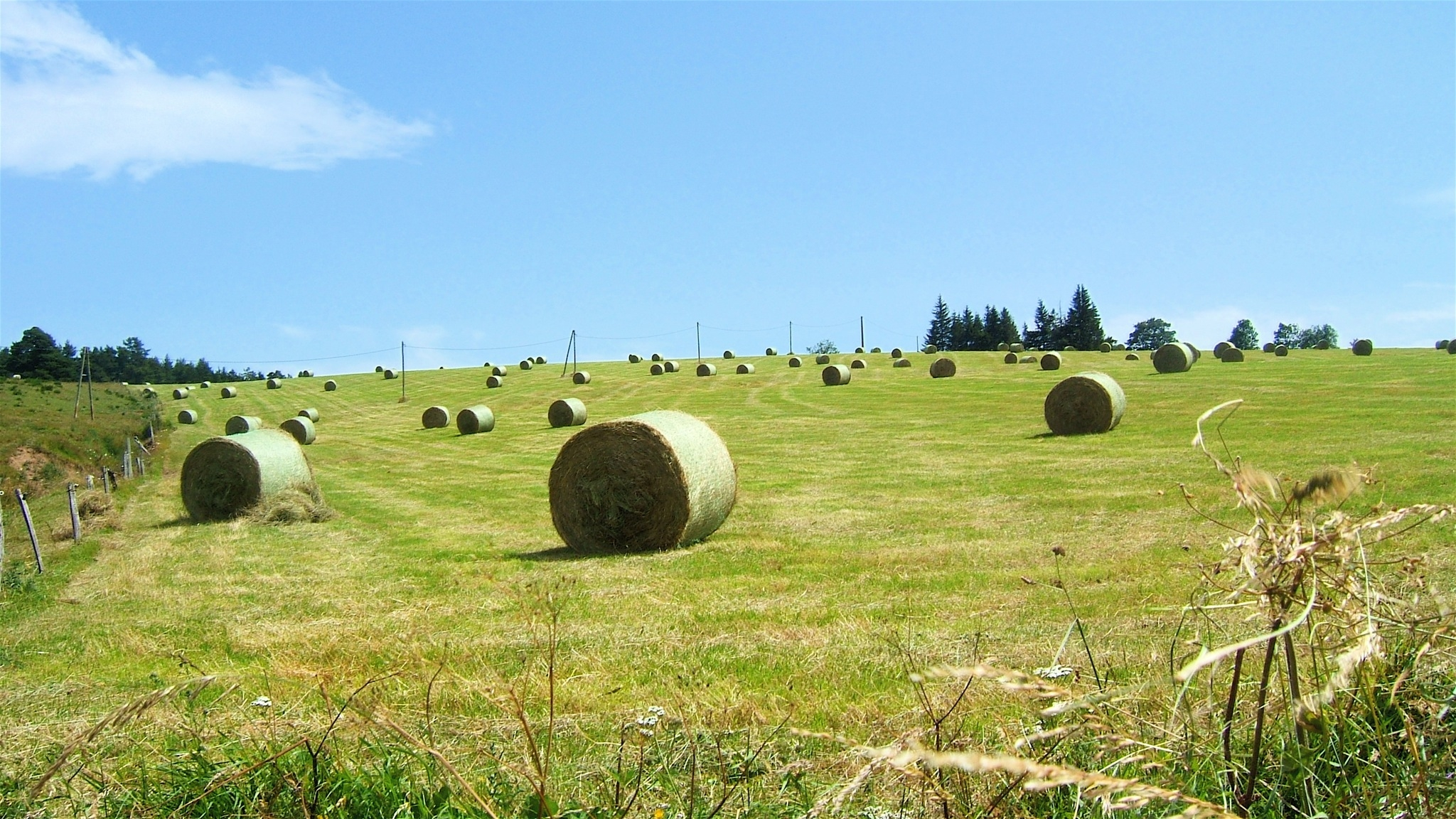
Hay bales in the Mézenc massif. Hay is the basis for fattening animals destined for the production of fin gras.

Fattening takes place in the barn for a minimum of 110 days. The animals are mainly fed unlimited amounts of hay, distributed at least four times a day (twice in the morning and twice in the evening), with the farmer having to remove the residue between each distribution. In this way, the cattle ingest a large quantity of hay, and a male can consume up to 15 kg a day. Most farmers say they reserve the best hay for fattening animals, giving them the bales in the center of the barn, but only the core of these bales. A supplement can be given to the animals if necessary, taking care not to fatten them too quickly. It must not exceed 700 g per 100 kg live weight daily, with a maximum of 4 kg for females and 5 kg for steers. At least four raw materials must be used in its composition, including two cereals. Only cereals, soybean, rapeseed, sunflower or linseed meal, peas, faba beans, lupins and molasses are accepted as raw materials, with mineral and vitamin supplements. Concentrates must contain at least 19% nitrogen, 1 FMU (meat forage unit) and have a PDI/ FMU ratio of 130.

=== Tracking ===
Introduced at the time of the mad cow crisis, the AOC Fin Gras du Mézenc is now highly traceable. Animals destined for fattening are marked with tags that remove a fragment of cartilage from the ear. The DNA of the sample can be compared with that of a piece of meat at any time during the marketing process, thus guaranteeing perfect traceability from the farm to the butcher's stall.

=== Slaughter ===
In the slaughterhouse, carcasses are not sawed, instead they are cut in half using a cleaver that does not heat up the carcass or disperse sawdust. The carcasses must be well preserved so that the maturing process lasts longer. The ban on fat removal contributes to this objective by leaving a good covering layer of fat. Maturation lasts a minimum of ten days for quarters and half-carcasses, and three days for pieces of meat to be braised or boiled.

After slaughter, approved carcasses are stamped with the words "FGM" (for Fin gras du Mézenc). The meat is only to be cut up for final consumption.

=== Distribution ===
Nowadays, nearly a hundred breeders in the Ardèche and Haute-Loire regions of France produce fin gras du Mézenc. They distribute their production to over 40 butchers and nearly 30 restaurants in the massif, as well as in the Loire, Drôme and Rhône regions. Among them is Régis Marcon, a restaurateur in Saint-Bonnet-le-Froid with three Michelin stars. Fin gras du Mézenc is not sold in supermarkets, where meat is sold under the name "bœuf de Pâques" (Easter beef), which does not comply with AOC specifications.

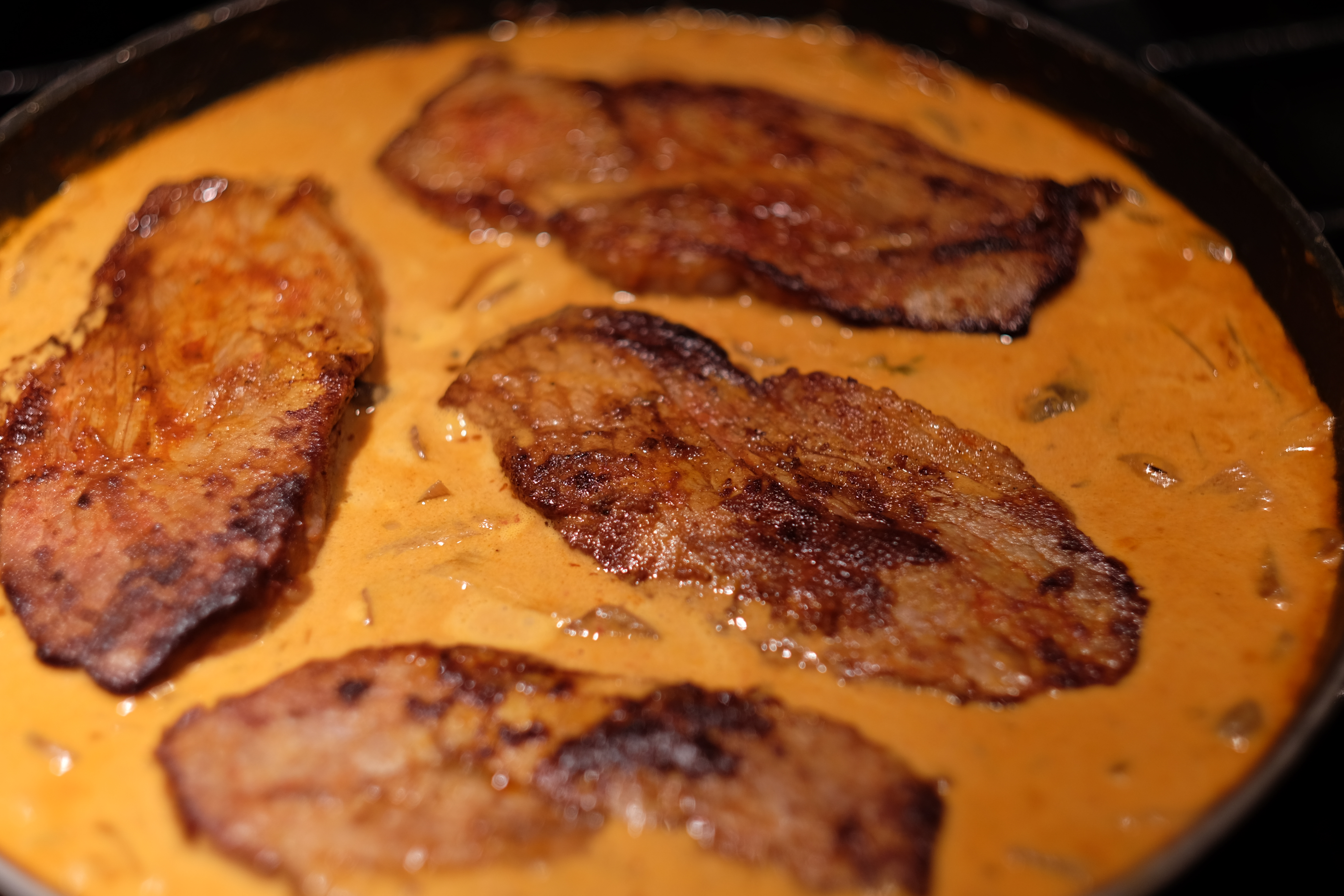
Beef Stroganoff

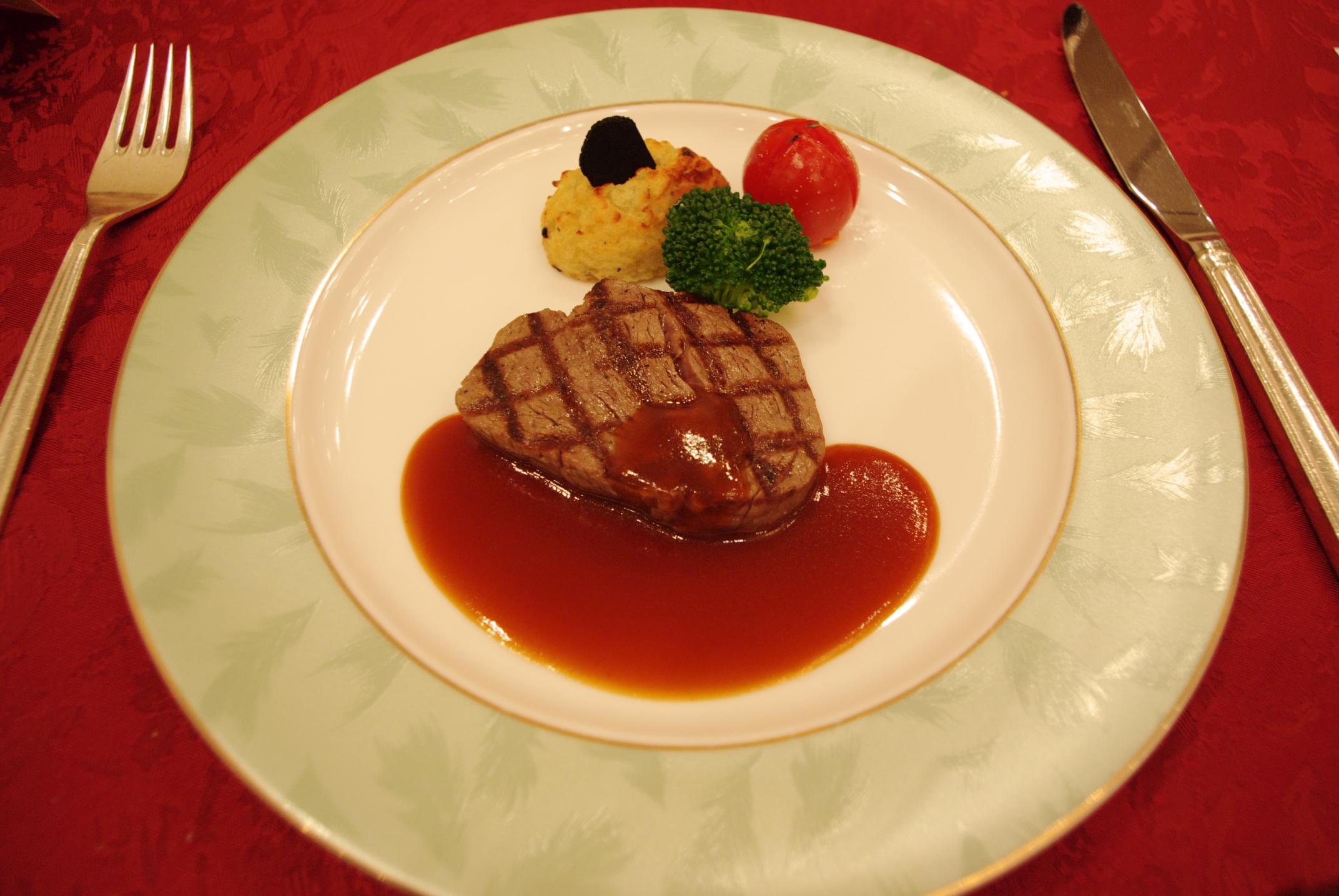
Grilled beef fillet, Madeira sauce

== AOC monitoring and management: the Fin Gras du Mézenc Association ==
The AOC Fin Gras du Mézenc is managed by an association in charge of monitoring and controlling production, as well as communication initiatives around this agricultural product. A full-time technician is employed by the association to help breeders with their practices. He follows the animals on the farm, visiting them at least four times before they are slaughtered: during the first two wintering periods and twice during fattening. At each visit, the technician rates the animals according to an internal grid that focuses on their muscular development, state of fattening, and general appearance. This score is used to approve animals for fin gras production. The association is accredited as an "organisme de défense et de gestion" and can therefore carry out all these checks itself, and is sometimes inspected by a certifying body responsible for validating these procedures. The time spent on these visits is financed by the farmer-producers through their membership fees, which averaged €0.43 per kilogram in 2007.

== Fin gras du Mézenc in culture ==
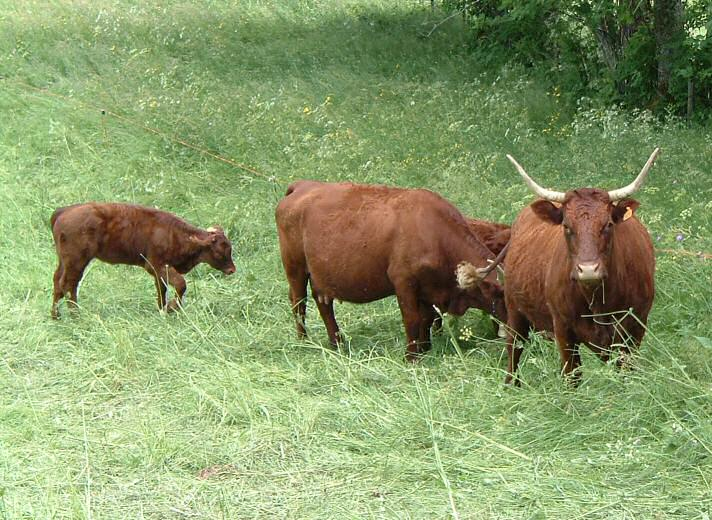
Salers cattle and calves

Fin gras production is associated with many traditional events in its region of origin. Breeders, for example, are accustomed to presenting the live animal in front of the butcher before it is slaughtered. The production season is also marked by fairs, which have been held on specific dates for over a century. The first is at Le Béage, on the third Saturday before Easter Sunday, followed by the fair at Les Estables on the second Thursday before Easter Sunday. At these fairs, the breeders wear the traditional black habit and red scarf, to which they sometimes add the AOC logo. These fairs, some of which already existed in the 18th century, such as the one in Saint-Agrève, are an opportunity for breeders to present their products, and for butchers and restaurateurs to taste and promote them to consumers. Finally, the Fin Gras season comes to an end on the first Sunday in June with the Fête du Fin Gras, when the animals get ready to leave the cowshed. It's an opportunity to see farmers and animals parade around, as well as to enjoy street performances, a local produce market, and themed walks. The festival is also the occasion for a gathering of the Cercle International des Sources de grands fleuves, which includes the Rhône in Switzerland, the Danube in Germany, and the Po in Italy.

In February 2009, the Maison du Fin Gras was opened in Chaudeyrolles in the Haute-Loire department. This museum introduces visitors to the tradition of fin gras production and its links with the local terroir, showing the various stages in the farmer's work. In addition, markers made mainly of flagstones mark the entrance to the appellation zone along the main roads. Each of the villages in the area has been presented with one of these markers by the Fin Gras du Mézenc association, which intends to further emphasize the link between the region and its signature product.

Fin gras is one of the emblems of the Mézenc region, and has helped to unite the area, which is split between the Auvergne and Rhône-Alpes administrative regions. Indeed, it is at the heart of the Pôle d'Excellence Rural (rural excellence project), which was started here in December 2005.

== See also ==
=== Related articles ===
- fr:Liste des AOC agroalimentaires françaises
- Boeuf gras
- Appellation d'origine contrôlée (AOC)
- Curing (food preservation)
- Foin de crau
- Le Puy green lentil

=== External links ===
- Cahier des charges de l'appellation "fin gras" registered with the European Commission [archive]
- Official website of the "AOC Fin Gras du Mézenc" association archive
- Mézenc documentation center archive

=== Bibliography ===
- Amélie Chapus, Le fin gras du Mézenc, Lyon, Thèse de médecine vétérinaire, 2008
- N. Ribet, J-C Mermet, A-M. Martin, L'éleveur et ses rois ou la mémoire du Fin Gras, Association des élus du massif du Mézenc, 1996, 53 p
- J. Agabriel, J-N Borget, N. Ribet, Fin Gras du Mézenc - Aire délimitée, Projet mis à l'enquête, Valence, Rapport INAO - Comité national des produits agro-alimentaires, 2004, 45 p.
