= Alleyrac =

- Commune
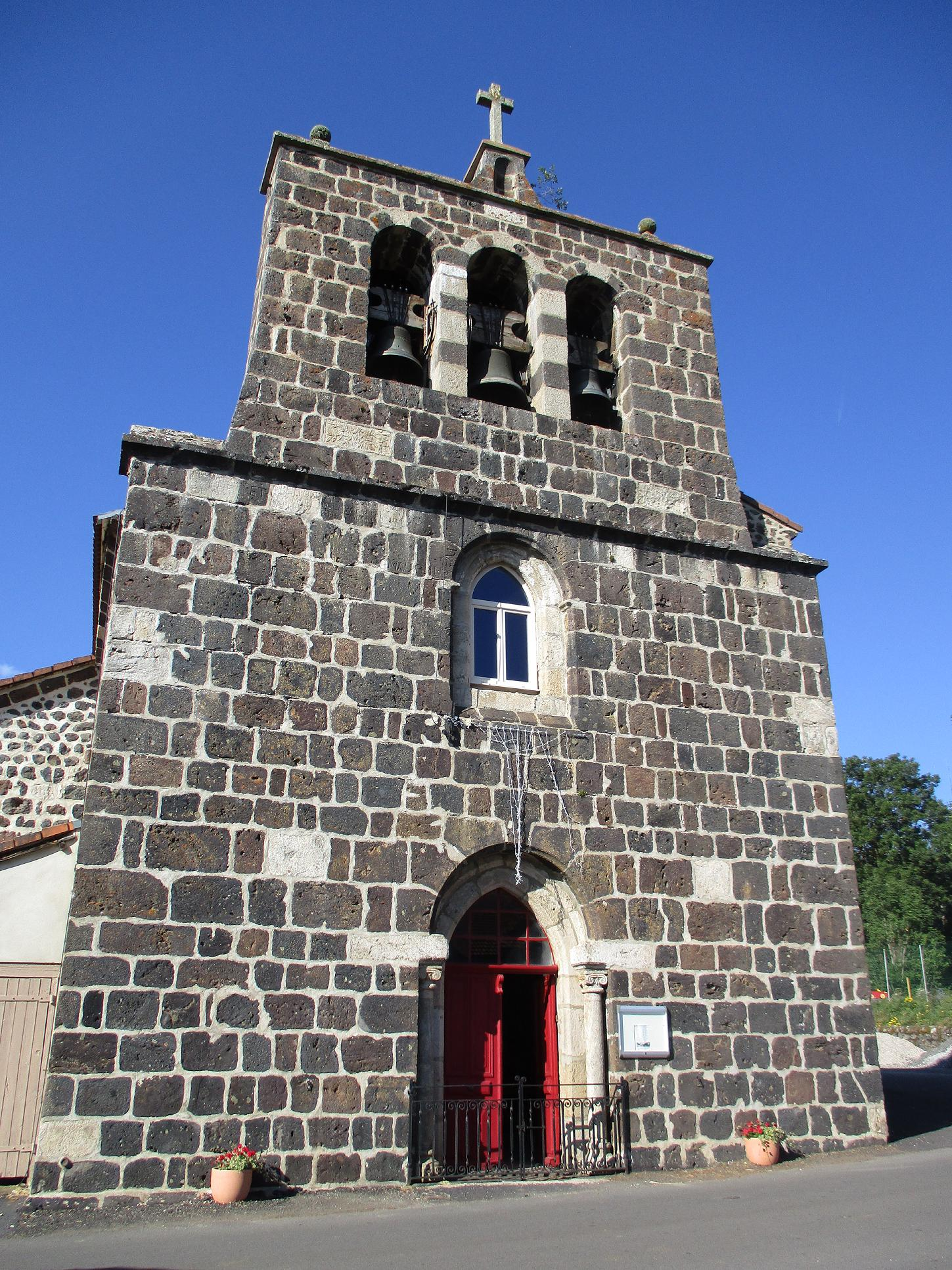
- Location of Alleyrac
- Location within France Location within Auvergne-Rhône-Alpes
- Coordinates: 44°53′28″N 3°59′14″E
- Country: France
- Region: Auvergne-Rhône-Alpes
- Department: Haute-Loire
- Arrondissement: Le Puy-en-Velay
- Canton: Mézenc
- Intercommunality: Mézenc-Loire-Meygal

Government
  - Mayor (2020–2026): Serge Villard
- Area^{1}: 11.34 km^{2} (4.38 sq mi)
- Elevation: 1,095 m (3,593 ft)
- Highest elevation: 1,283 m (4,209 ft)
- Lowest elevation: 1,025 m (3,363 ft)
- Population (2023): 117
  - Density: 10.3/km^{2} (26.7/sq mi)
- Time zone: UTC+01:00 (CET)
  - Summer (DST): UTC+02:00 (CEST)
- INSEE/Postal code: 43004 /43150
- ^{1} French Land Register data, which excludes lakes, ponds, glaciers > 1 km^{2} (0.386 sq mi or 247 acres) and river estuaries.

Alleyrac (French pronunciation: [alɛʁak]; Occitan: Alairac) is a commune in the Haute-Loire department in south-central France.

== Population ==
Historical population
Year	Pop.	±% p.a.
1968	264	—
1975	206	−3.48%
1982	165	−3.12%
1990	129	−3.03%
1999	118	−0.99%
2007	121	+0.31%
2012	117	−0.67%
2017	117	+0.00%
2023	117	+0.00%
Source: INSEE

== See also ==
- Communes of the Haute-Loire department
