= Salettes, Haute-Loire =

Salettes
- Commune
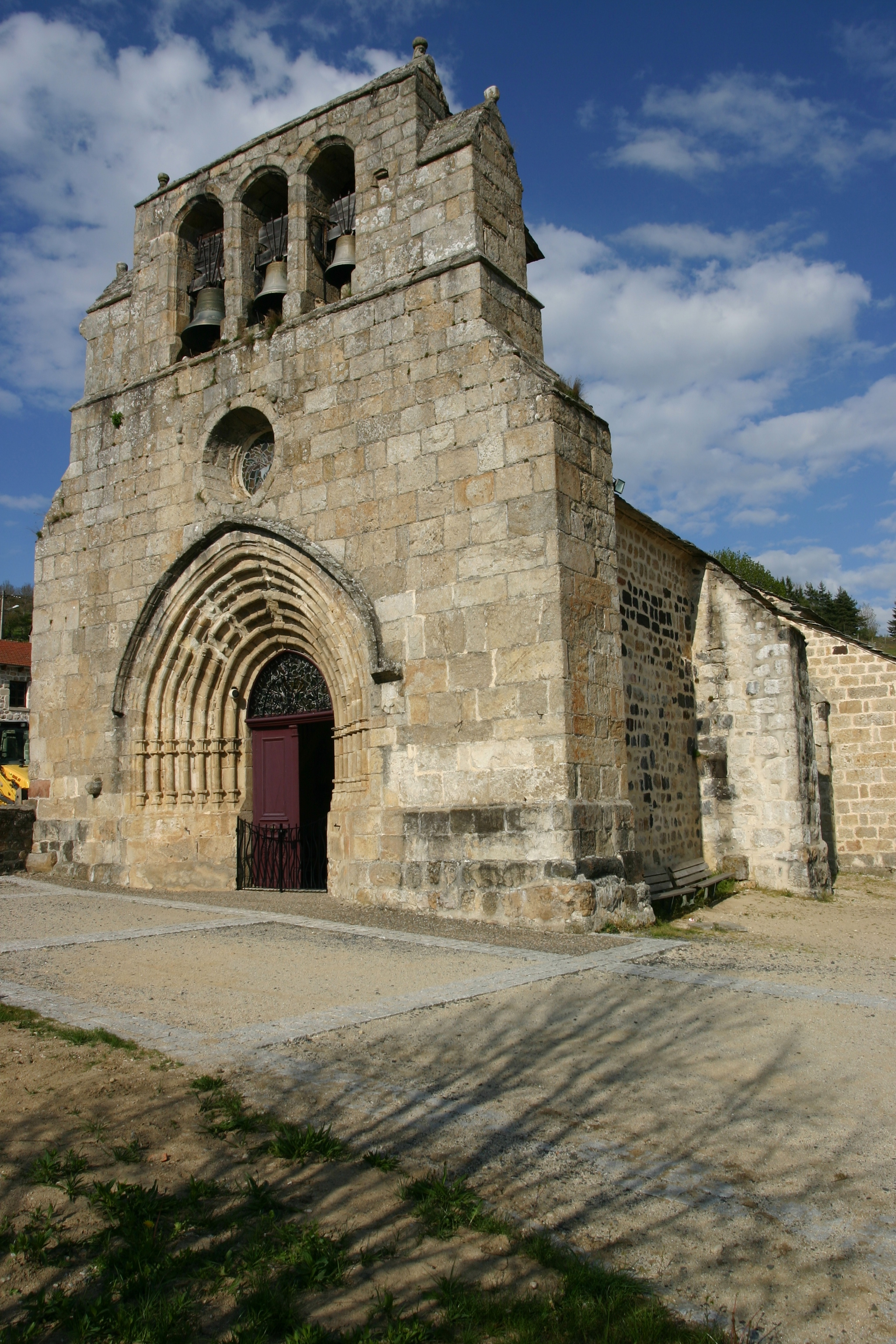
- Location of Salettes
- Location within France Location within Auvergne-Rhône-Alpes
- Coordinates: 44°51′50″N 3°57′58″E
- Country: France
- Region: Auvergne-Rhône-Alpes
- Department: Haute-Loire
- Arrondissement: Le Puy-en-Velay
- Canton: Mézenc

Government
  - Mayor (2020–2026): Francis Delmas
- Area^{1}: 20.28 km^{2} (7.83 sq mi)
- Elevation: 930 m (3,050 ft)
- Highest elevation: 1,181 m (3,875 ft)
- Lowest elevation: 786 m (2,579 ft)
- Population (2023): 156
  - Density: 7.69/km^{2} (19.9/sq mi)
- Time zone: UTC+01:00 (CET)
  - Summer (DST): UTC+02:00 (CEST)
- INSEE/Postal code: 43231 /43150
- ^{1} French Land Register data, which excludes lakes, ponds, glaciers > 1 km^{2} (0.386 sq mi or 247 acres) and river estuaries.

Salettes (French pronunciation: [salɛt]; Occitan: Saletas) is a commune in the Haute-Loire department in south-central France.

== Population ==
Historical population
Year	Pop.	±% p.a.
1968	419	—
1975	355	−2.34%
1982	274	−3.63%
1990	190	−4.47%
1999	129	−4.21%
2007	153	+2.16%
2012	143	−1.34%
2017	136	−1.00%
2023	156	+2.31%
Source: INSEE

== See also ==
- Communes of the Haute-Loire department
