= Chadron, Haute-Loire =

Chadron
- Commune
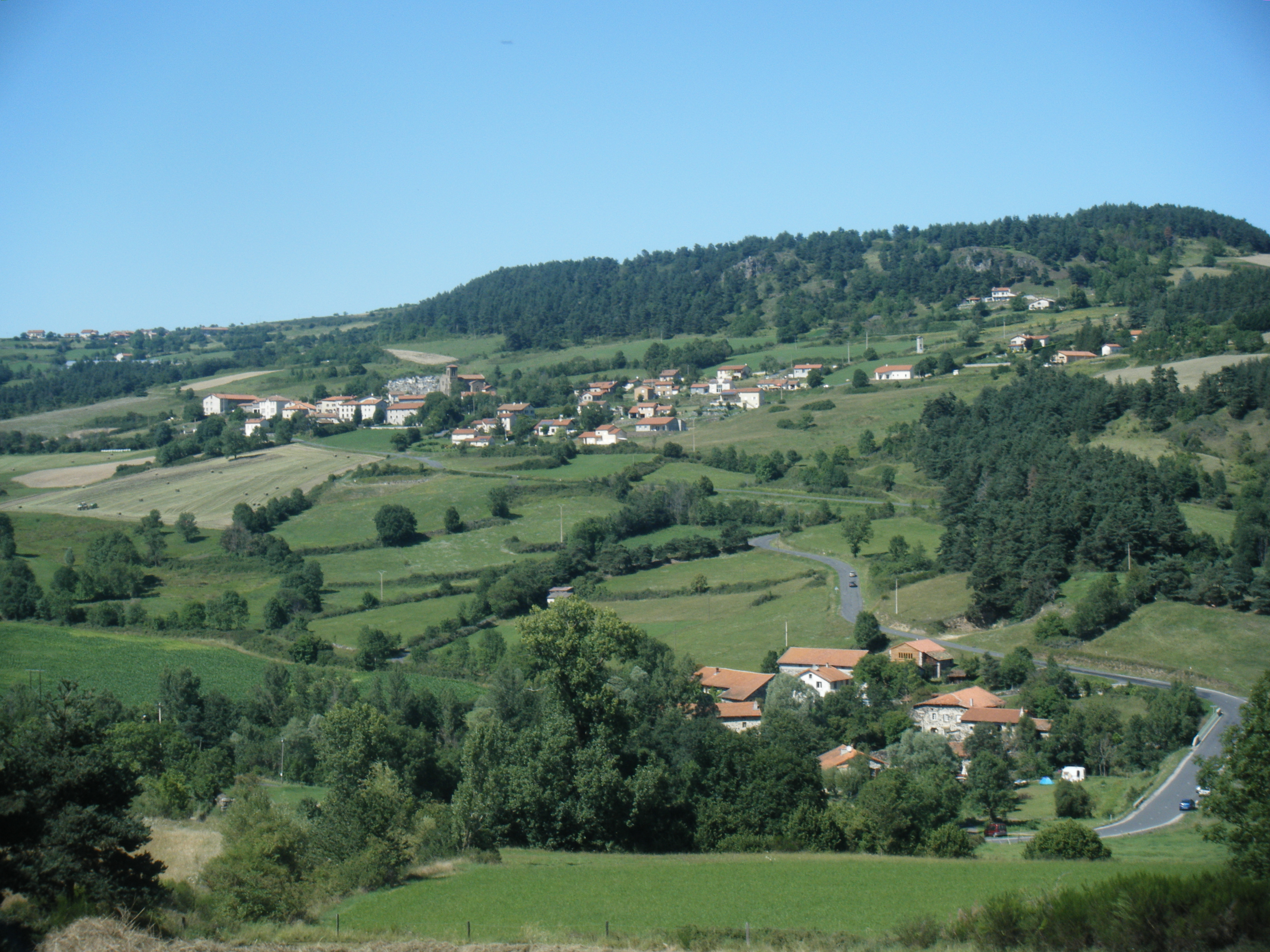
- Location of Chadron
- Location within France Location within Auvergne-Rhône-Alpes
- Coordinates: 44°57′42″N 3°56′09″E
- Country: France
- Region: Auvergne-Rhône-Alpes
- Department: Haute-Loire
- Arrondissement: Le Puy-en-Velay
- Canton: Mézenc

Government
  - Mayor (2020–2026): Aymeric Roudil
- Area^{1}: 13.62 km^{2} (5.26 sq mi)
- Elevation: 785 m (2,575 ft)
- Highest elevation: 983 m (3,225 ft)
- Lowest elevation: 667 m (2,188 ft)
- Population (2023): 346
  - Density: 25.4/km^{2} (65.8/sq mi)
- Time zone: UTC+01:00 (CET)
  - Summer (DST): UTC+02:00 (CEST)
- INSEE/Postal code: 43047 /43150
- ^{1} French Land Register data, which excludes lakes, ponds, glaciers > 1 km^{2} (0.386 sq mi or 247 acres) and river estuaries.

Chadron (French pronunciation: [ʃadʁɔ̃]) is a commune in the Haute-Loire department in south-central France.

== Population ==
Historical population
Year	Pop.	±% p.a.
1968	291	—
1975	216	−4.17%
1982	205	−0.74%
1990	204	−0.06%
1999	207	+0.16%
2007	227	+1.16%
2012	271	+3.61%
2017	292	+1.50%
2023	346	+2.87%
Source: INSEE

== See also ==
- Communes of the Haute-Loire department
