= Lantriac =

- Commune
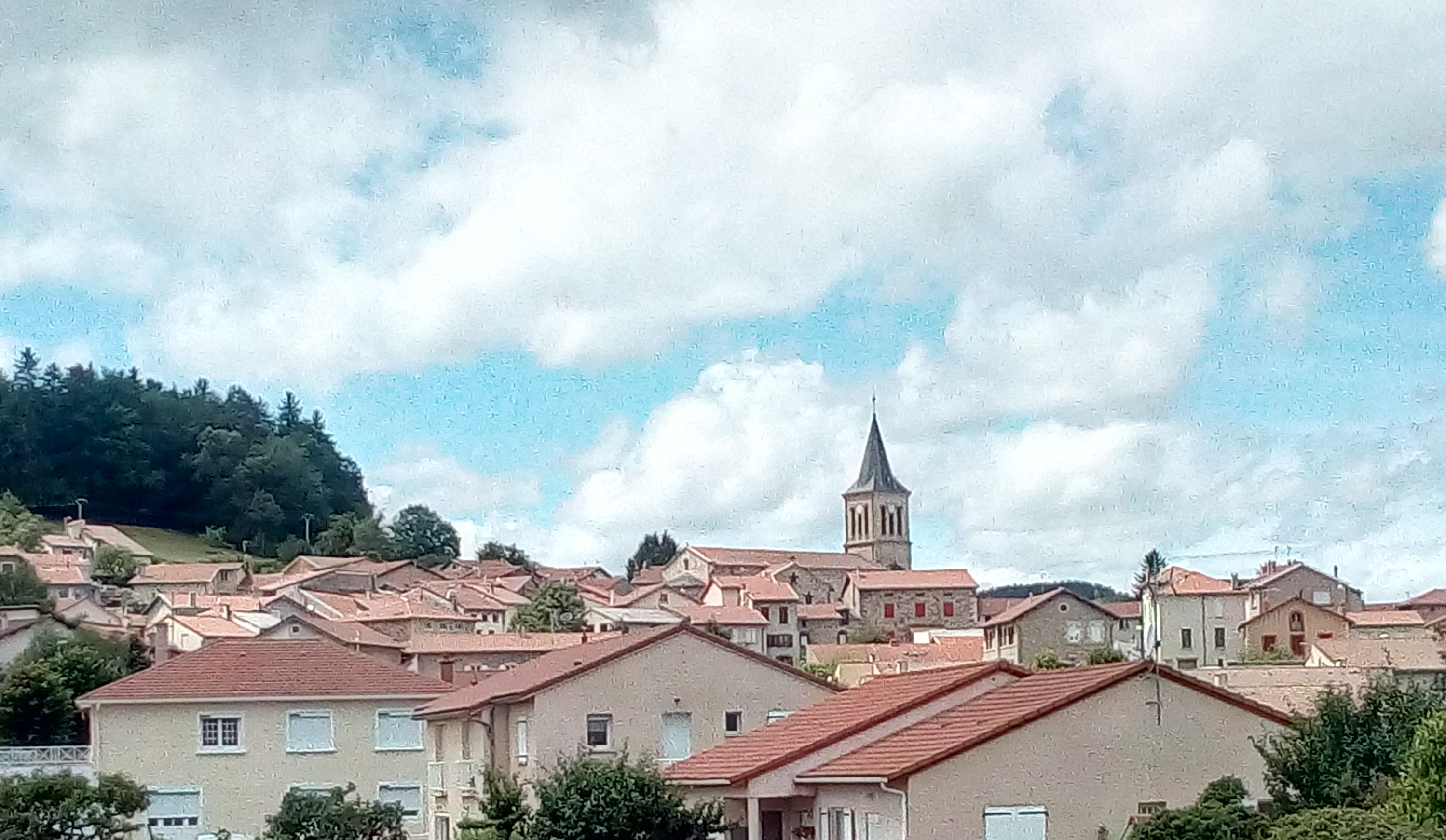
- Location of Lantriac
- Location within France Location within Auvergne-Rhône-Alpes
- Coordinates: 45°00′06″N 4°00′16″E
- Country: France
- Region: Auvergne-Rhône-Alpes
- Department: Haute-Loire
- Arrondissement: Le Puy-en-Velay
- Canton: Mézenc

Government
  - Mayor (2020–2026): Pierre Bressellle
- Area^{1}: 22.83 km^{2} (8.81 sq mi)
- Elevation: 738 m (2,421 ft)
- Highest elevation: 1,083 m (3,553 ft)
- Lowest elevation: 678 m (2,224 ft)
- Population (2023): 1,921
  - Density: 84.14/km^{2} (217.9/sq mi)
- Time zone: UTC+01:00 (CET)
  - Summer (DST): UTC+02:00 (CEST)
- INSEE/Postal code: 43113 /43260
- ^{1} French Land Register data, which excludes lakes, ponds, glaciers > 1 km^{2} (0.386 sq mi or 247 acres) and river estuaries.

Lantriac (French pronunciation: [lɑ̃tʁijak]) is a commune in the Haute-Loire department in south-central France.

== Population ==
Historical population
Year	Pop.	±% p.a.
1968	892	—
1975	981	+1.37%
1982	1,244	+3.45%
1990	1,468	+2.09%
1999	1,597	+0.94%
2007	1,801	+1.51%
2012	1,888	+0.95%
2017	1,928	+0.42%
2023	1,921	−0.06%
Source: INSEE

== See also ==
- Communes of the Haute-Loire department
