= Canton of Mézenc =

Coordinates: 45.06°N 4.30°E

The canton of Mézenc is an administrative division of the Haute-Loire department, south-central France. It was created at the French canton reorganisation which came into effect in March 2015. Its seat is in Le Chambon-sur-Lignon.

It consists of the following communes:

1. Alleyrac
2. Chadron
3. Le Chambon-sur-Lignon
4. Champclause
5. Chaudeyrolles
6. Les Estables
7. Fay-sur-Lignon
8. Freycenet-la-Cuche
9. Freycenet-la-Tour
10. Goudet
11. Lantriac
12. Laussonne
13. Mazet-Saint-Voy
14. Le Monastier-sur-Gazeille
15. Montusclat
16. Moudeyres
17. Présailles
18. Saint-Front
19. Saint-Martin-de-Fugères
20. Salettes
21. Les Vastres
