= Champclause =

- Commune
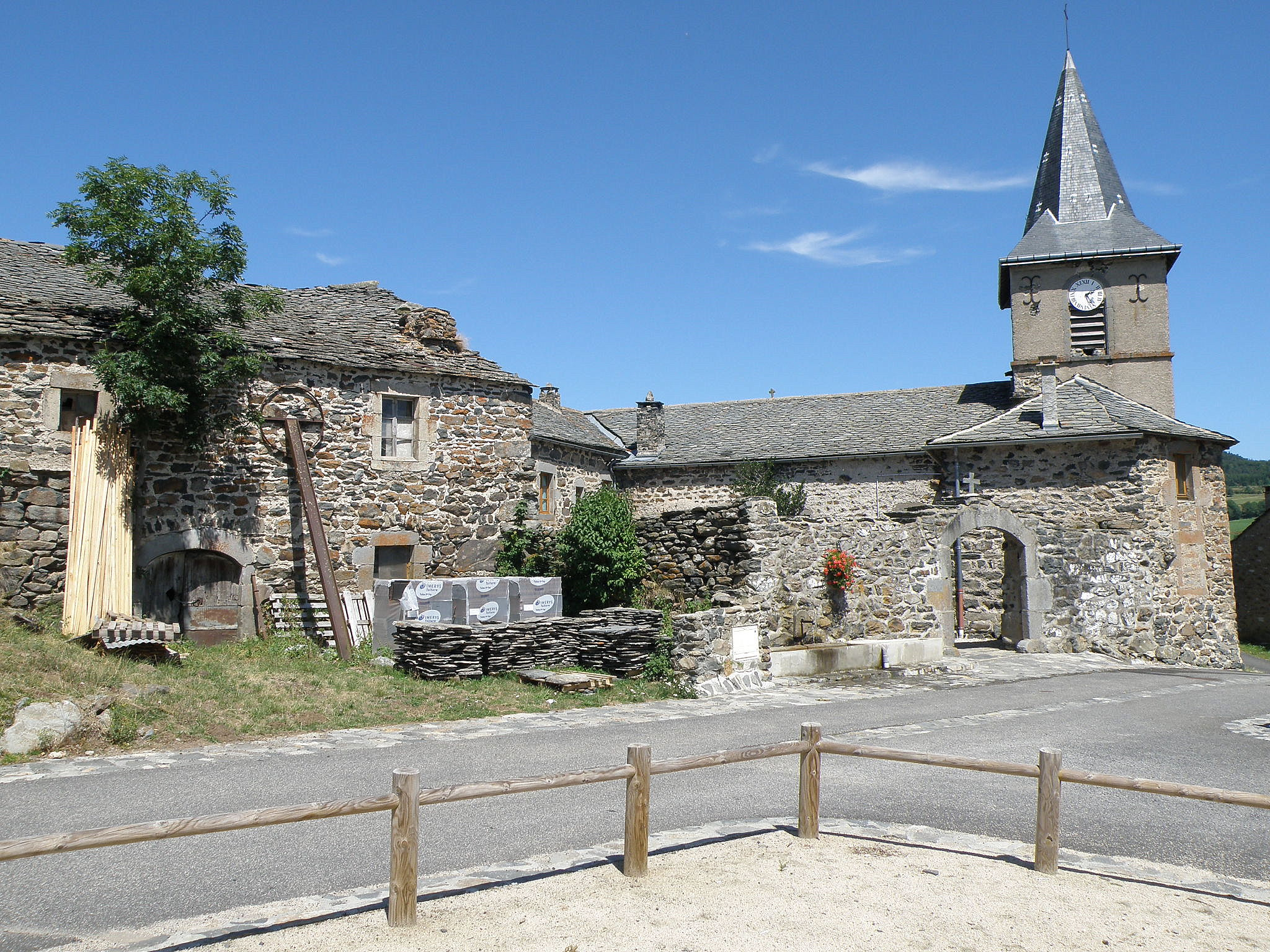
- Village of Boussoulet
- Location of Champclause
- Location within France Location within Auvergne-Rhône-Alpes
- Coordinates: 45°01′25″N 4°10′36″E
- Country: France
- Region: Auvergne-Rhône-Alpes
- Department: Haute-Loire
- Arrondissement: Le Puy-en-Velay
- Canton: Mézenc

Government
  - Mayor (2020–2026): Emmanuel Palhier
- Area^{1}: 22.27 km^{2} (8.60 sq mi)
- Elevation: 1,119 m (3,671 ft)
- Highest elevation: 1,436 m (4,711 ft)
- Lowest elevation: 1,108 m (3,635 ft)
- Population (2023): 201
  - Density: 9.03/km^{2} (23.4/sq mi)
- Time zone: UTC+01:00 (CET)
  - Summer (DST): UTC+02:00 (CEST)
- INSEE/Postal code: 43053 /43260
- ^{1} French Land Register data, which excludes lakes, ponds, glaciers > 1 km^{2} (0.386 sq mi or 247 acres) and river estuaries.

Champclause (French pronunciation: [ʃɑ̃kloz]; Occitan: Chalmclausa) is a commune in the Haute-Loire department in south-central France.

== Population ==
Historical population
Year	Pop.	±% p.a.
1968	446	—
1975	373	−2.52%
1982	274	−4.31%
1990	243	−1.49%
1999	229	−0.66%
2007	229	+0.00%
2012	203	−2.38%
2017	201	−0.20%
2023	201	+0.00%
Source: INSEE

== See also ==
- Communes of the Haute-Loire department
