= Freycenet-la-Cuche =

- Commune
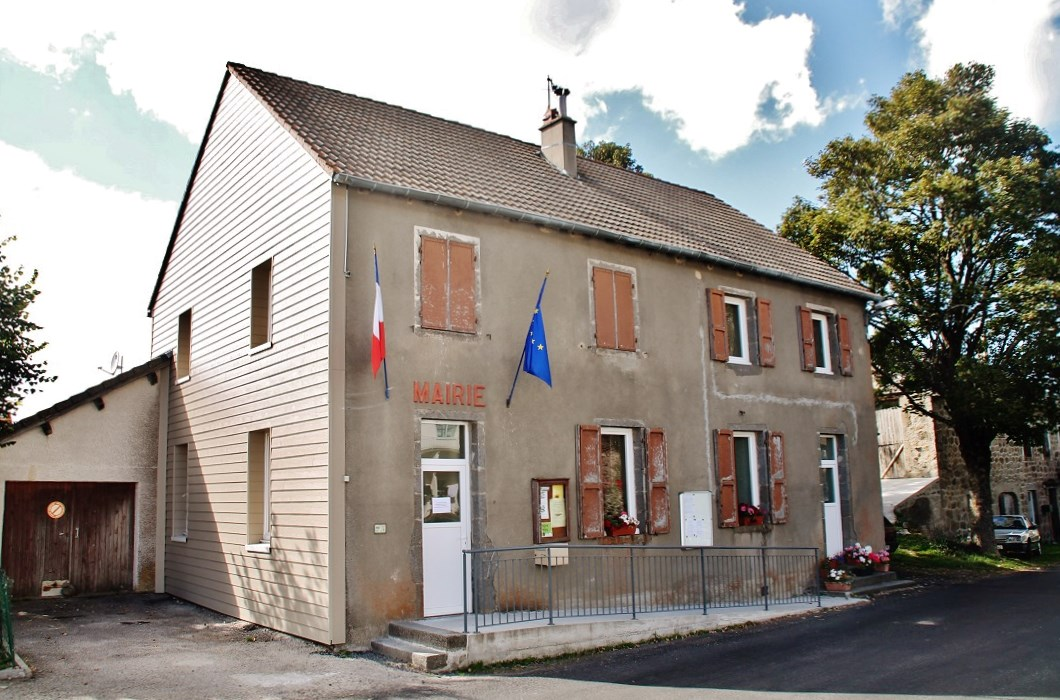
- Town hall

- Coat of arms
- Location of Freycenet-la-Cuche
- Location within France Location within Auvergne-Rhône-Alpes
- Coordinates: 44°53′43″N 4°05′19″E
- Country: France
- Region: Auvergne-Rhône-Alpes
- Department: Haute-Loire
- Arrondissement: Le Puy-en-Velay
- Canton: Mézenc

Government
  - Mayor (2020–2026): Hervé Romieu
- Area^{1}: 16.25 km^{2} (6.27 sq mi)
- Elevation: 1,170 m (3,840 ft)
- Highest elevation: 1,524 m (5,000 ft)
- Lowest elevation: 1,034 m (3,392 ft)
- Population (2023): 105
  - Density: 6.46/km^{2} (16.7/sq mi)
- Time zone: UTC+01:00 (CET)
  - Summer (DST): UTC+02:00 (CEST)
- INSEE/Postal code: 43097 /43150
- ^{1} French Land Register data, which excludes lakes, ponds, glaciers > 1 km^{2} (0.386 sq mi or 247 acres) and river estuaries.

Freycenet-la-Cuche (French pronunciation: [fʁɛsnɛ la kyʃ]; Occitan: Fraissenet de la Cucha) is a commune in the Haute-Loire department in south-central France.

== Population ==
Historical population
Year	Pop.	±% p.a.
1968	367	—
1975	285	−3.55%
1982	216	−3.88%
1990	176	−2.53%
1999	145	−2.13%
2007	149	+0.34%
2012	114	−5.21%
2017	106	−1.44%
2023	105	−0.16%
Source: INSEE

== See also ==
- Communes of the Haute-Loire department
