= Les Vastres =

- Commune
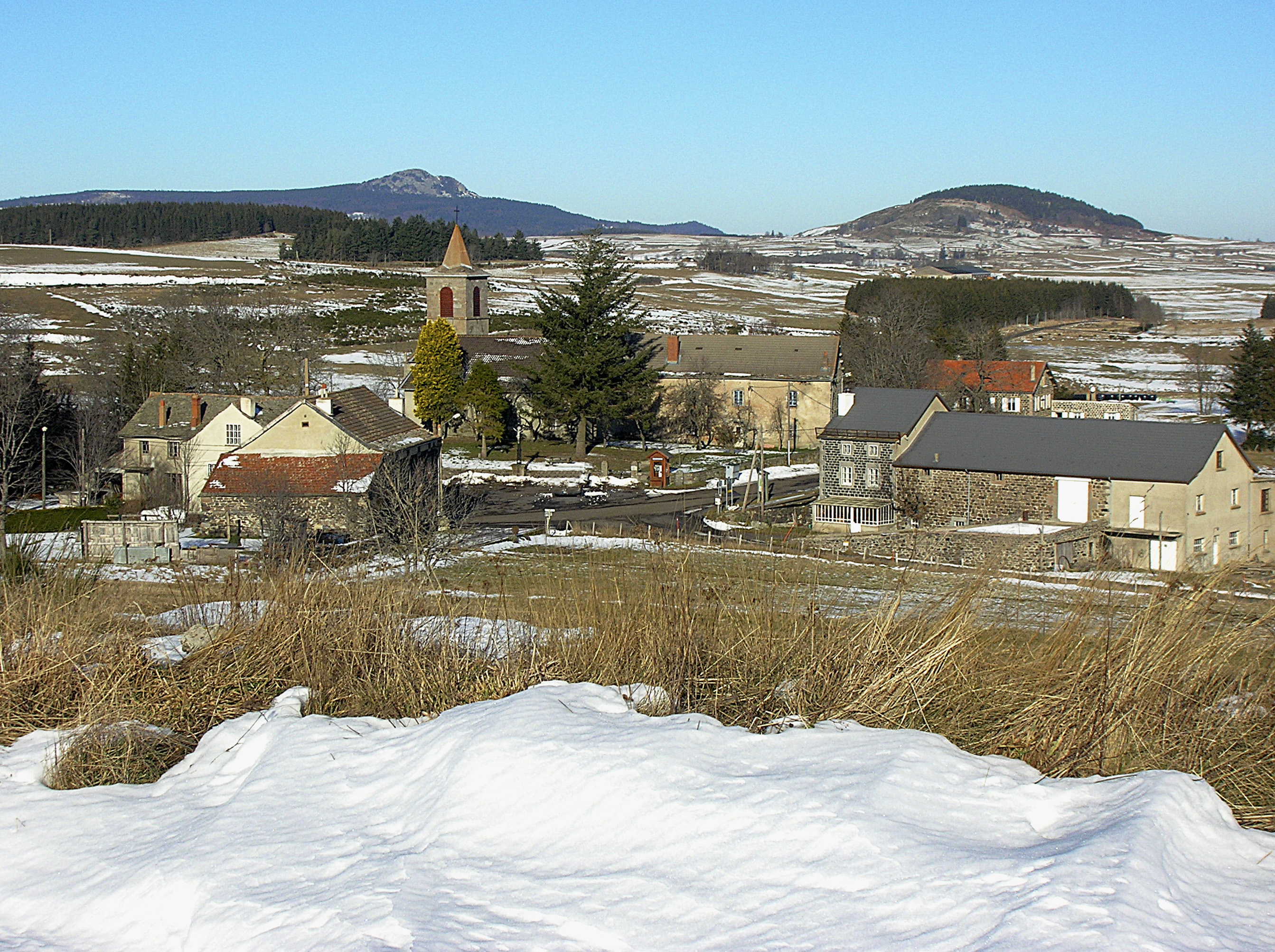
- Location of Les Vastres
- Location within France Location within Auvergne-Rhône-Alpes
- Coordinates: 44°59′24″N 4°15′42″E
- Country: France
- Region: Auvergne-Rhône-Alpes
- Department: Haute-Loire
- Arrondissement: Le Puy-en-Velay
- Canton: Mézenc

Government
  - Mayor (2020–2026): Jean Luc Chambon
- Area^{1}: 30.34 km^{2} (11.71 sq mi)
- Elevation: 1,100 m (3,600 ft)
- Highest elevation: 1,215 m (3,986 ft)
- Lowest elevation: 777 m (2,549 ft)
- Population (2023): 192
  - Density: 6.33/km^{2} (16.4/sq mi)
- Time zone: UTC+01:00 (CET)
  - Summer (DST): UTC+02:00 (CEST)
- INSEE/Postal code: 43253 /43430
- ^{1} French Land Register data, which excludes lakes, ponds, glaciers > 1 km^{2} (0.386 sq mi or 247 acres) and river estuaries.

Les Vastres (French pronunciation: [le vastʁ]) is a commune in the Haute-Loire department in south-central France.

== Geography ==
The river Lignon du Velay flows through the commune.

== Population ==
Historical population
Year	Pop.	±% p.a.
1968	588	—
1975	470	−3.15%
1982	358	−3.81%
1990	310	−1.78%
1999	221	−3.69%
2007	243	+1.19%
2012	209	−2.97%
2017	203	−0.58%
2023	192	−0.92%
Source: INSEE

== See also ==
- Communes of the Haute-Loire department
