= Moudeyres =

- Commune
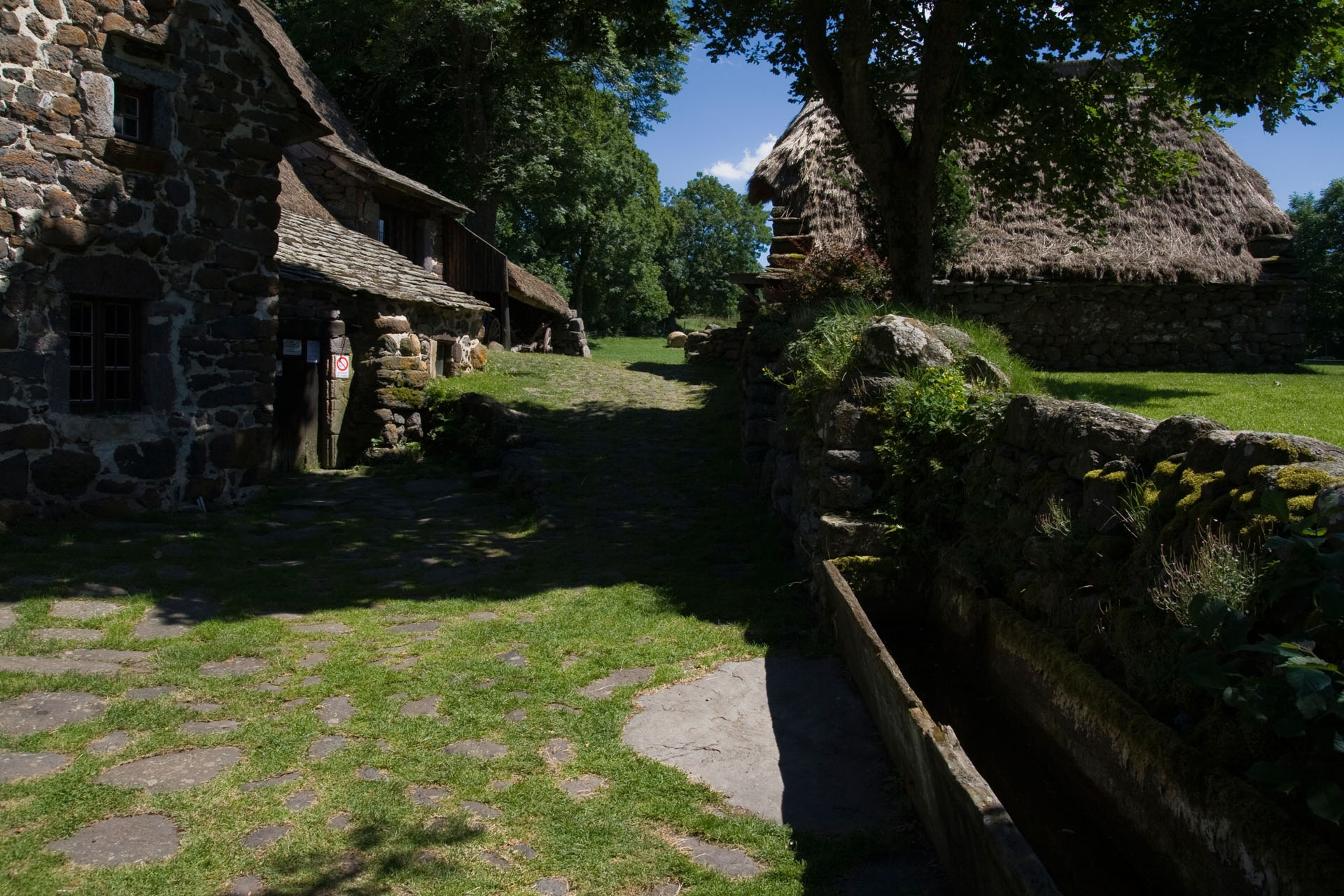
- Perrel brothers' farm
- Location of Moudeyres
- Location within France Location within Auvergne-Rhône-Alpes
- Coordinates: 44°57′21″N 4°06′02″E
- Country: France
- Region: Auvergne-Rhône-Alpes
- Department: Haute-Loire
- Arrondissement: Le Puy-en-Velay
- Canton: Mézenc

Government
  - Mayor (2020–2026): Laurent Gentes
- Area^{1}: 9.25 km^{2} (3.57 sq mi)
- Elevation: 1,177 m (3,862 ft)
- Highest elevation: 1,286 m (4,219 ft)
- Lowest elevation: 957 m (3,140 ft)
- Population (2023): 115
  - Density: 12.4/km^{2} (32.2/sq mi)
- Time zone: UTC+01:00 (CET)
  - Summer (DST): UTC+02:00 (CEST)
- INSEE/Postal code: 43144 /43150
- ^{1} French Land Register data, which excludes lakes, ponds, glaciers > 1 km^{2} (0.386 sq mi or 247 acres) and river estuaries.

Moudeyres (French pronunciation: [mudɛʁ]; Occitan: Modeiras) is a commune in the Haute-Loire department in south-central France.

== Population ==
Historical population
Year	Pop.	±% p.a.
1968	183	—
1975	131	−4.66%
1982	132	+0.11%
1990	111	−2.14%
1999	104	−0.72%
2007	105	+0.12%
2012	104	−0.19%
2017	100	−0.78%
2023	115	+2.36%
Source: INSEE

== See also ==
- Communes of the Haute-Loire department
