= Montusclat =

- Commune
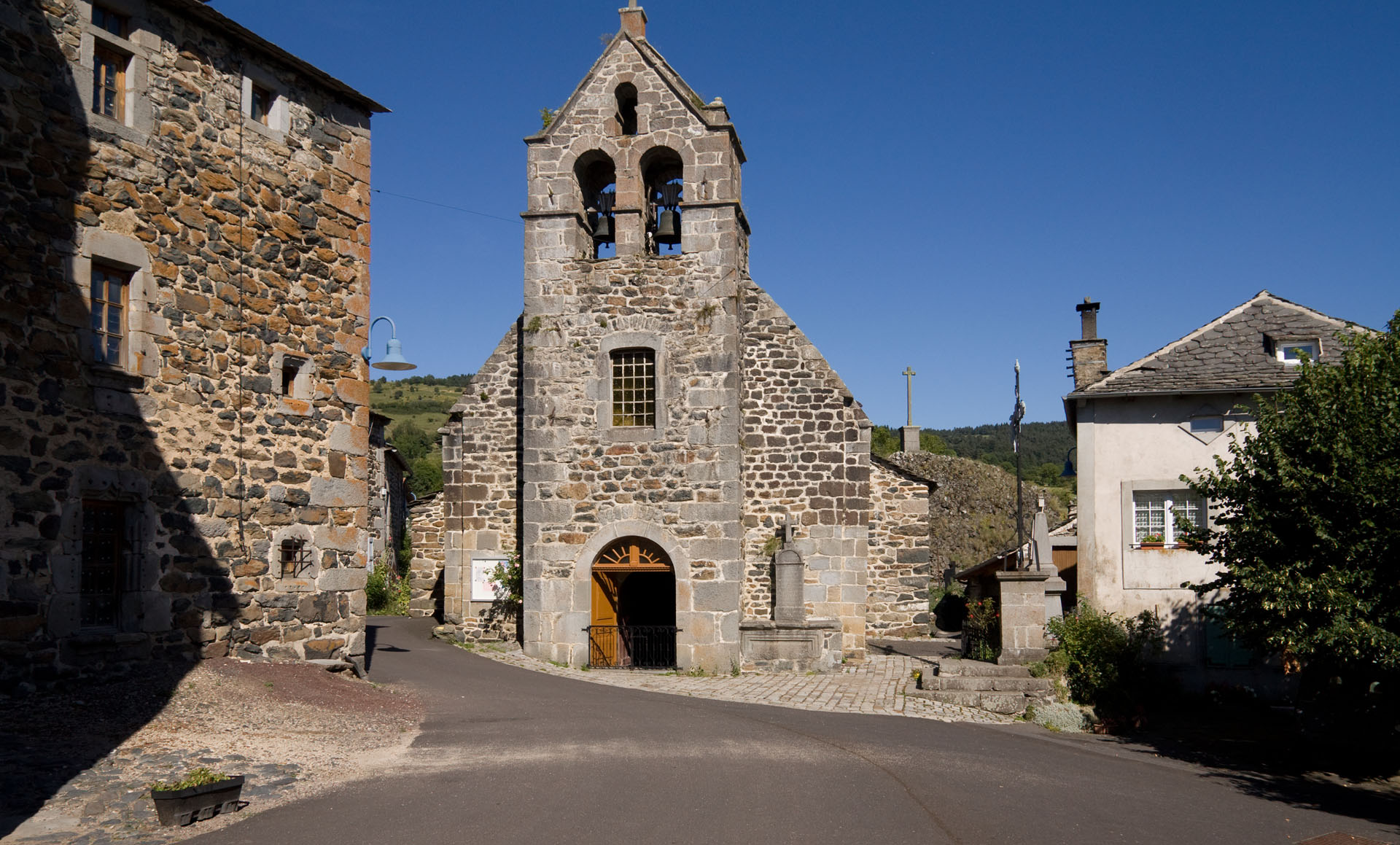
- Location of Montusclat
- Location within France Location within Auvergne-Rhône-Alpes
- Coordinates: 45°00′51″N 4°07′31″E
- Country: France
- Region: Auvergne-Rhône-Alpes
- Department: Haute-Loire
- Arrondissement: Le Puy-en-Velay
- Canton: Mézenc

Government
  - Mayor (2022–2026): Bernard Chalendard
- Area^{1}: 10.47 km^{2} (4.04 sq mi)
- Elevation: 1,055 m (3,461 ft)
- Highest elevation: 1,328 m (4,357 ft)
- Lowest elevation: 832 m (2,730 ft)
- Population (2023): 125
  - Density: 11.9/km^{2} (30.9/sq mi)
- Time zone: UTC+01:00 (CET)
  - Summer (DST): UTC+02:00 (CEST)
- INSEE/Postal code: 43143 /43260
- ^{1} French Land Register data, which excludes lakes, ponds, glaciers > 1 km^{2} (0.386 sq mi or 247 acres) and river estuaries.

Montusclat (French pronunciation: [mɔ̃tyskla]) is a commune in the Haute-Loire department in south-central France.

== Population ==
Historical population
Year	Pop.	±% p.a.
1968	170	—
1975	141	−2.64%
1982	127	−1.48%
1990	120	−0.71%
1999	124	+0.36%
2007	126	+0.20%
2012	134	+1.24%
2017	138	+0.59%
2023	125	−1.64%
Source: INSEE

== See also ==
- Communes of the Haute-Loire department
