= Freycenet-la-Tour =

- Commune
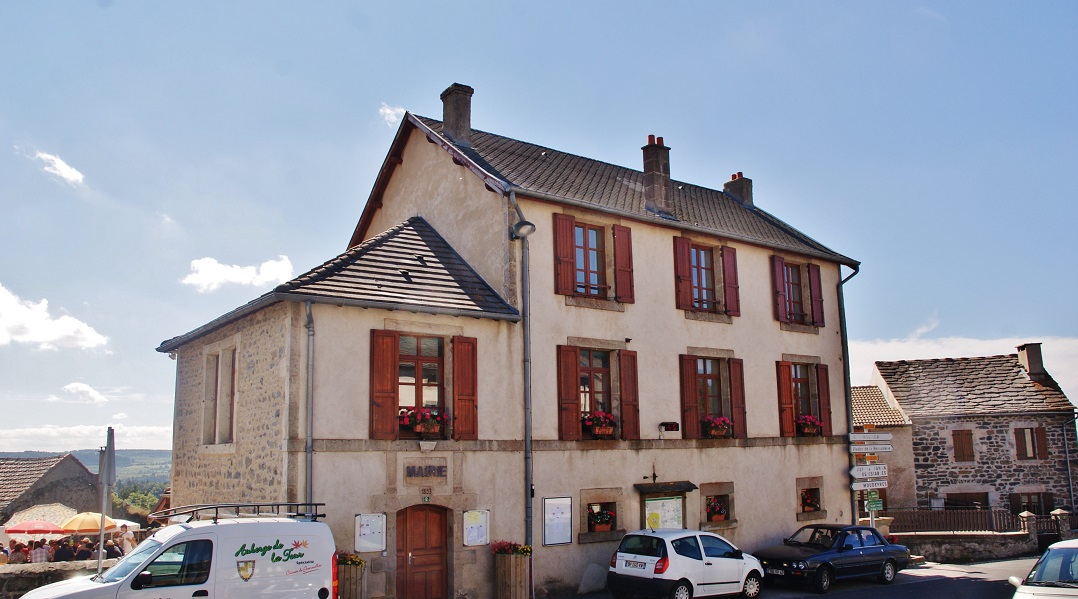
- Town hall
- Location of Freycenet-la-Tour
- Location within France Location within Auvergne-Rhône-Alpes
- Coordinates: 44°56′23″N 4°03′36″E
- Country: France
- Region: Auvergne-Rhône-Alpes
- Department: Haute-Loire
- Arrondissement: Le Puy-en-Velay
- Canton: Mézenc

Government
  - Mayor (2020–2026): Jean-Marc Fargier
- Area^{1}: 7.93 km^{2} (3.06 sq mi)
- Elevation: 1,130 m (3,710 ft)
- Highest elevation: 1,244 m (4,081 ft)
- Lowest elevation: 964 m (3,163 ft)
- Population (2023): 117
  - Density: 14.8/km^{2} (38.2/sq mi)
- Time zone: UTC+01:00 (CET)
  - Summer (DST): UTC+02:00 (CEST)
- INSEE/Postal code: 43098 /43150
- ^{1} French Land Register data, which excludes lakes, ponds, glaciers > 1 km^{2} (0.386 sq mi or 247 acres) and river estuaries.

Freycenet-la-Tour (French pronunciation: [fʁɛsnɛ la tuʁ]; Occitan: Fraissenet de la Tor) is a commune in the Haute-Loire department in south-central France.

== Population ==
Historical population
Year	Pop.	±% p.a.
1968	270	—
1975	224	−2.63%
1982	184	−2.77%
1990	152	−2.36%
1999	146	−0.45%
2007	129	−1.54%
2012	110	−3.14%
2017	104	−1.12%
2023	117	+1.98%
Source: INSEE

== See also ==
- Communes of the Haute-Loire department
