= Saint-Front, Haute-Loire =

Saint-Front
- Commune
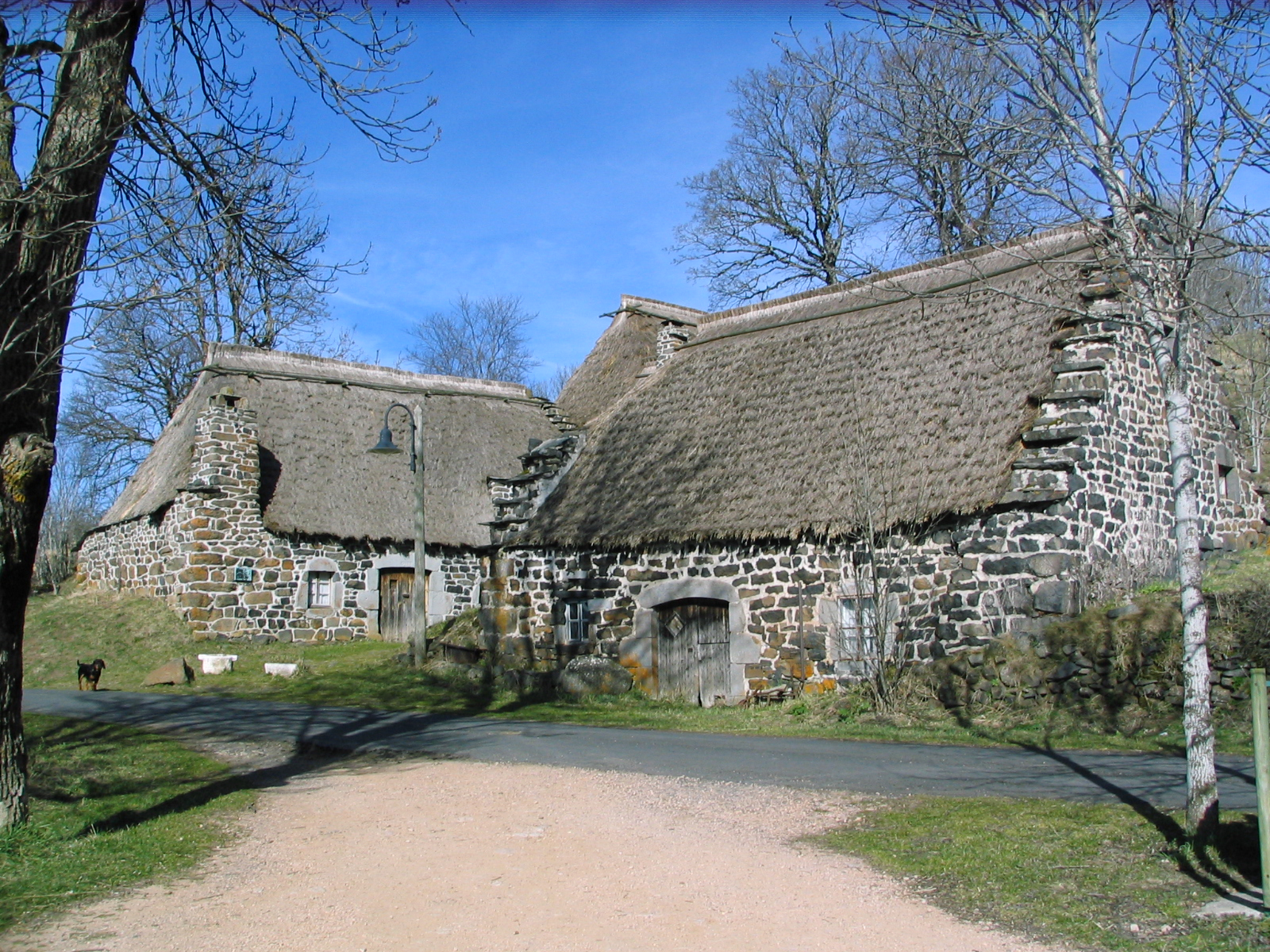
- Mezenc cottages
- Location of Saint-Front
- Location within France Location within Auvergne-Rhône-Alpes
- Coordinates: 44°58′41″N 4°08′35″E
- Country: France
- Region: Auvergne-Rhône-Alpes
- Department: Haute-Loire
- Arrondissement: Le Puy-en-Velay
- Canton: Mézenc

Government
  - Mayor (2020–2026): Philippe Delabre
- Area^{1}: 52.33 km^{2} (20.20 sq mi)
- Elevation: 1,223 m (4,012 ft)
- Highest elevation: 1,594 m (5,230 ft)
- Lowest elevation: 796 m (2,612 ft)
- Population (2023): 410
  - Density: 7.8/km^{2} (20/sq mi)
- Time zone: UTC+01:00 (CET)
  - Summer (DST): UTC+02:00 (CEST)
- INSEE/Postal code: 43186 /43550
- ^{1} French Land Register data, which excludes lakes, ponds, glaciers > 1 km^{2} (0.386 sq mi or 247 acres) and river estuaries.

Saint-Front (French pronunciation: [sɛ̃ fʁɔ̃]; Occitan: Sant Front) is a commune in the Haute-Loire department in south-central France.

== Geography ==
The river Lignon du Velay forms most of the commune's southeastern border.

== Population ==
Historical population
Year	Pop.	±% p.a.
1968	1,106	—
1975	849	−3.71%
1982	644	−3.87%
1990	544	−2.09%
1999	509	−0.74%
2007	482	−0.68%
2012	440	−1.81%
2017	403	−1.74%
2023	410	+0.29%
Source: INSEE

== Gallery ==
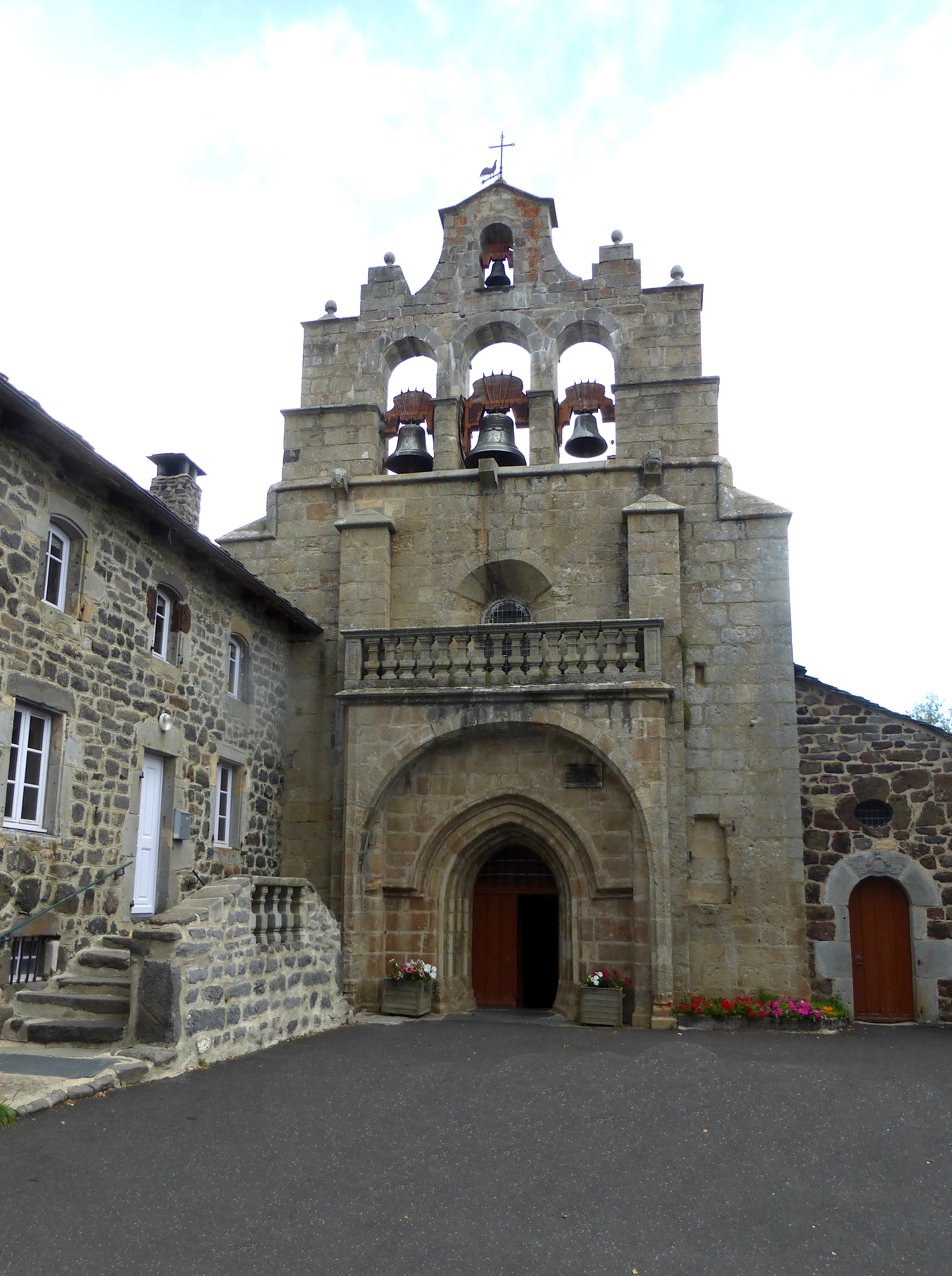
The Church of Saint-Front

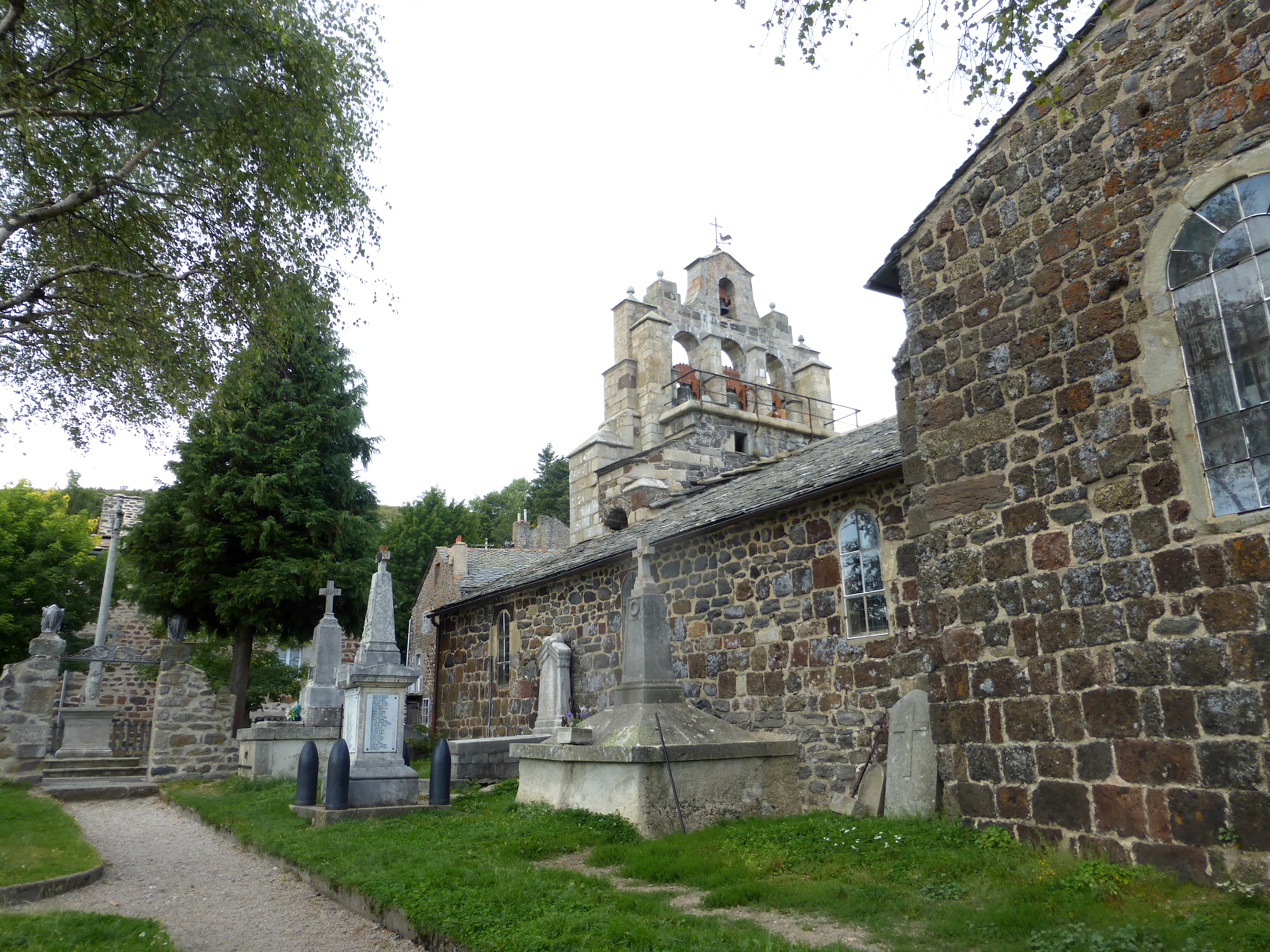
The Church and the old Cemetery

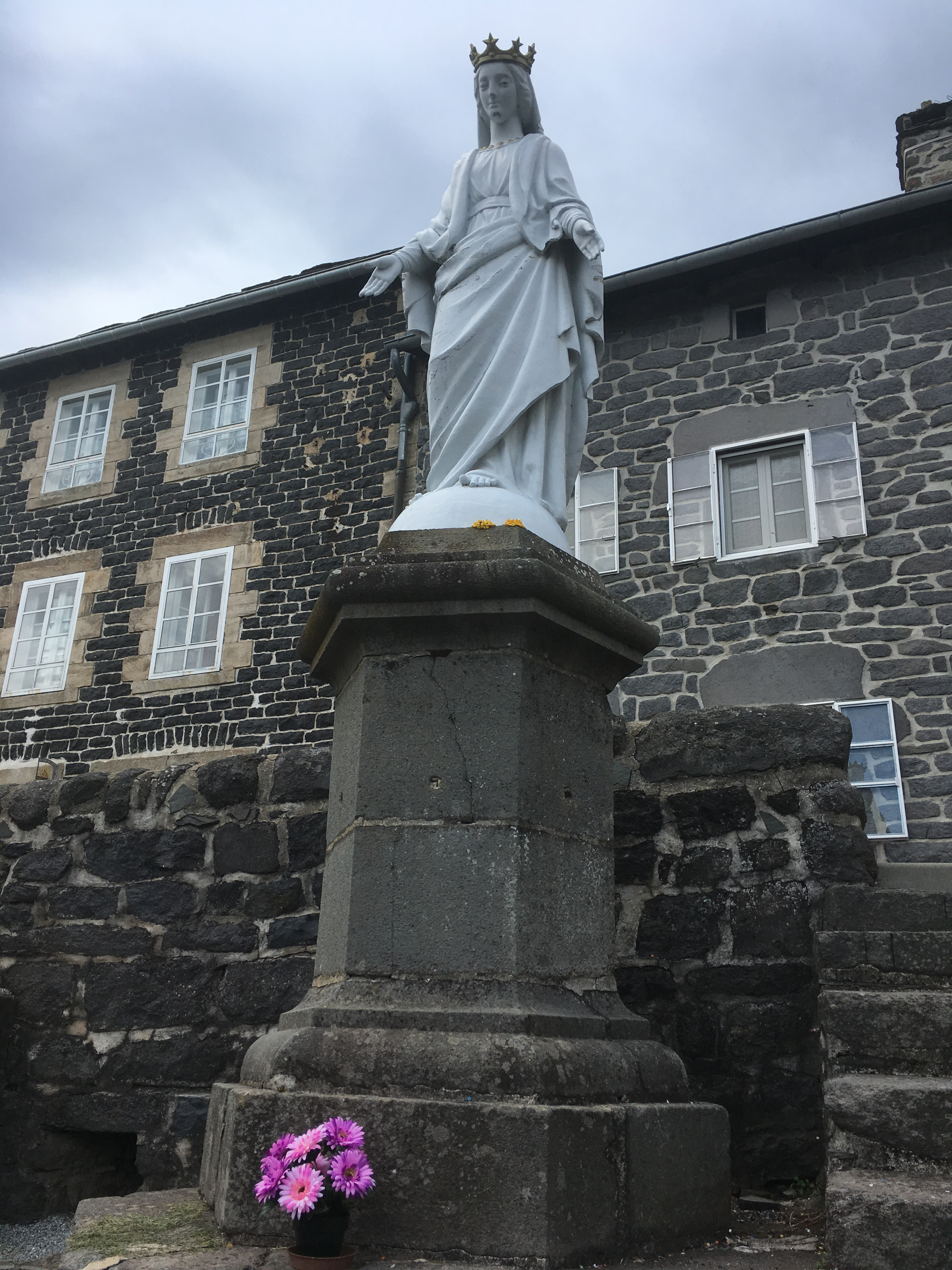
Statue of the Virgin Mary

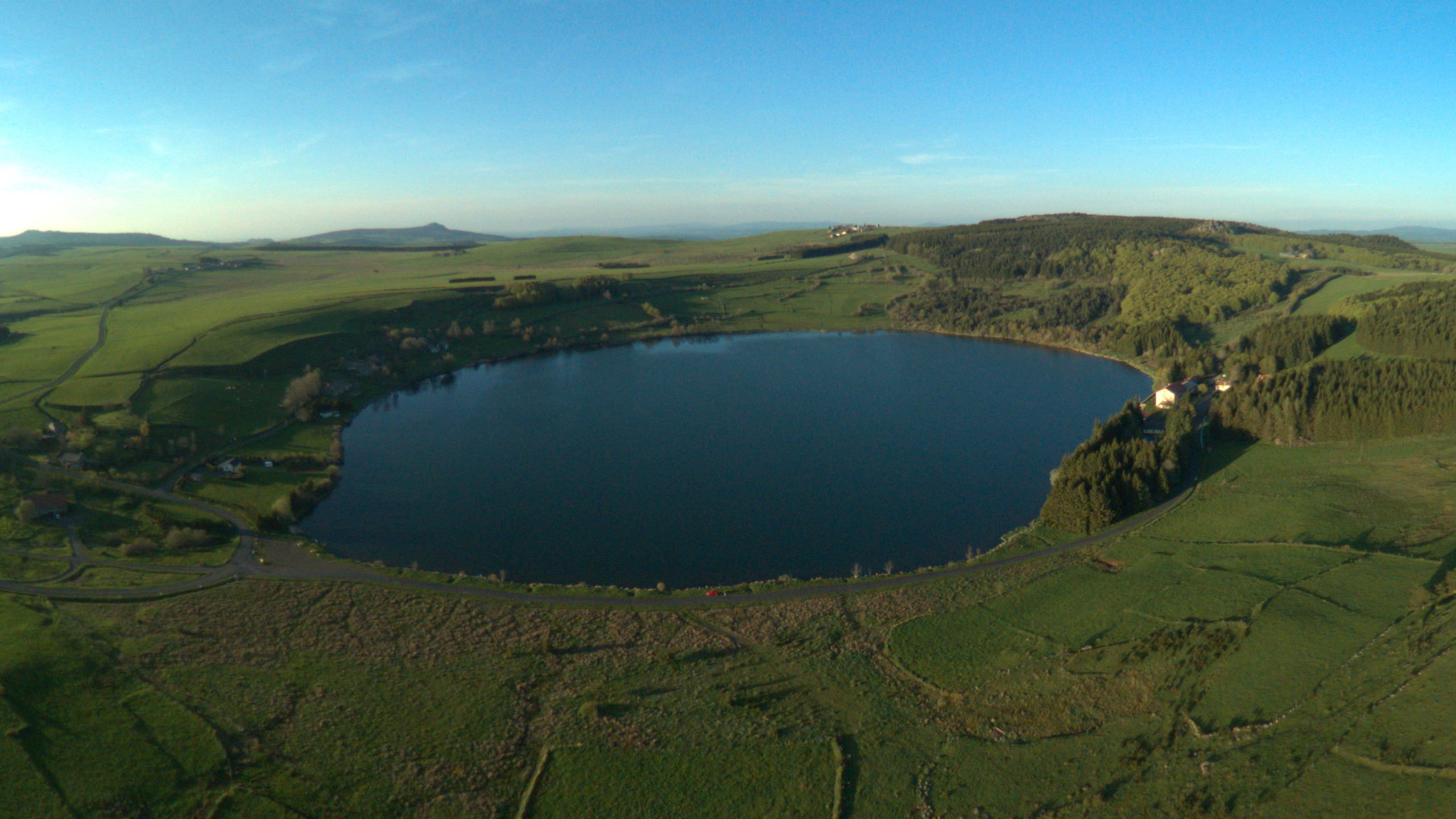
The lake of Saint-Front

== See also ==
- Communes of the Haute-Loire department
