= Fay-sur-Lignon =

- Commune
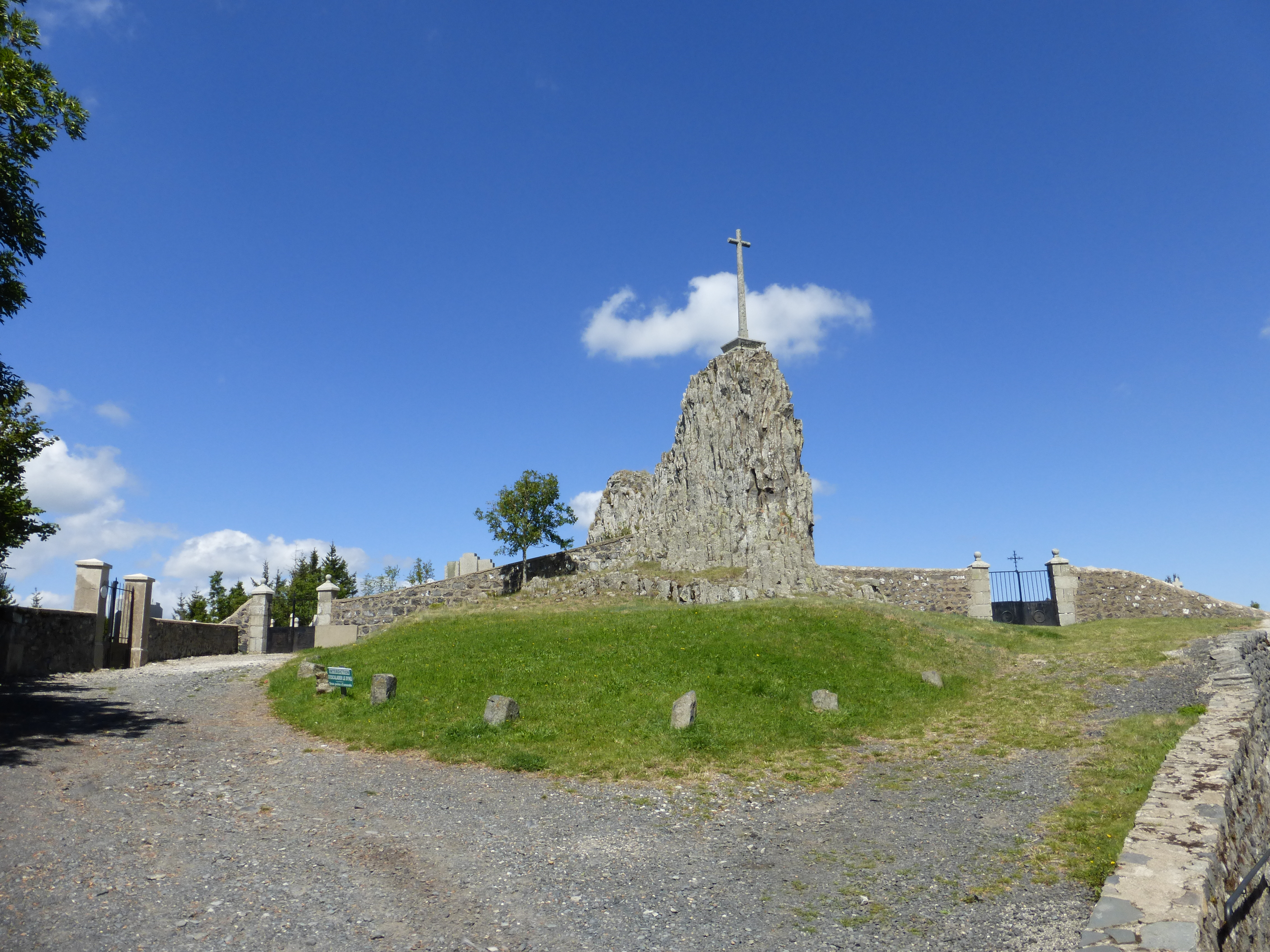
- Volcanic dike

- Coat of arms
- Location of Fay-sur-Lignon
- Location within France Location within Auvergne-Rhône-Alpes
- Coordinates: 44°59′14″N 4°13′38″E
- Country: France
- Region: Auvergne-Rhône-Alpes
- Department: Haute-Loire
- Arrondissement: Le Puy-en-Velay
- Canton: Mézenc

Government
  - Mayor (2020–2026): Christian Chorliet
- Area^{1}: 13.24 km^{2} (5.11 sq mi)
- Highest elevation: 1,380 m (4,530 ft)
- Lowest elevation: 1,079 m (3,540 ft)
- Population (2023): 335
  - Density: 25.3/km^{2} (65.5/sq mi)
- Time zone: UTC+01:00 (CET)
  - Summer (DST): UTC+02:00 (CEST)
- INSEE/Postal code: 43092 /43430
- ^{1} French Land Register data, which excludes lakes, ponds, glaciers > 1 km^{2} (0.386 sq mi or 247 acres) and river estuaries.

Fay-sur-Lignon (French pronunciation: [faj syʁ liɲɔ̃], literally Fay on Lignon; Occitan: Fai) is a commune in the Haute-Loire department in south-central France.

== Geography ==
The river Lignon du Velay flows through the commune.

== Population ==
Historical population
Year	Pop.	±% p.a.
1968	621	—
1975	527	−2.32%
1982	480	−1.33%
1990	441	−1.05%
1999	399	−1.11%
2007	426	+0.82%
2012	395	−1.50%
2017	363	−1.68%
2023	335	−1.33%
Source: INSEE

== See also ==
- Communes of the Haute-Loire department
