= Présailles =

- Commune
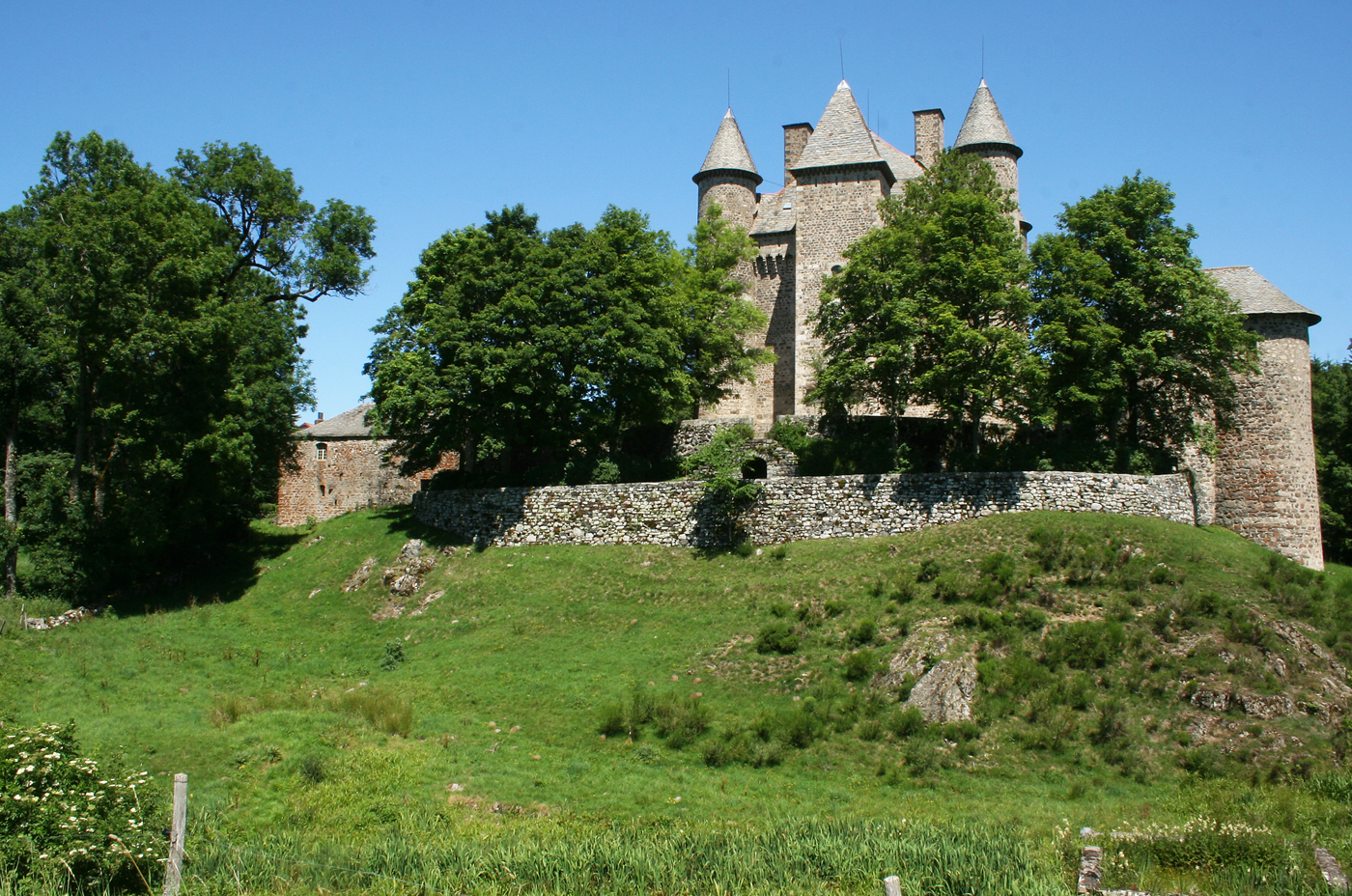
- Château de Vachères
- Location of Présailles
- Location within France Location within Auvergne-Rhône-Alpes
- Coordinates: 44°54′09″N 4°01′43″E
- Country: France
- Region: Auvergne-Rhône-Alpes
- Department: Haute-Loire
- Arrondissement: Le Puy-en-Velay
- Canton: Mézenc

Government
  - Mayor (2020–2026): Olivier Allemand
- Area^{1}: 22.23 km^{2} (8.58 sq mi)
- Elevation: 1,102 m (3,615 ft)
- Highest elevation: 1,283 m (4,209 ft)
- Lowest elevation: 960 m (3,150 ft)
- Population (2023): 108
  - Density: 4.86/km^{2} (12.6/sq mi)
- Time zone: UTC+01:00 (CET)
  - Summer (DST): UTC+02:00 (CEST)
- INSEE/Postal code: 43156 /43150
- ^{1} French Land Register data, which excludes lakes, ponds, glaciers > 1 km^{2} (0.386 sq mi or 247 acres) and river estuaries.

Présailles (French pronunciation: [pʁezaj]) is a commune in the Haute-Loire department in south-central France.

== Population ==
Historical population
Year	Pop.	±% p.a.
1968	457	—
1975	385	−2.42%
1982	312	−2.96%
1990	230	−3.74%
1999	161	−3.89%
2007	157	−0.31%
2012	142	−1.99%
2017	116	−3.96%
2023	108	−1.18%
Source: INSEE

== See also ==
- Communes of the Haute-Loire department
