= Le Puy green lentil =

Variety of lentil

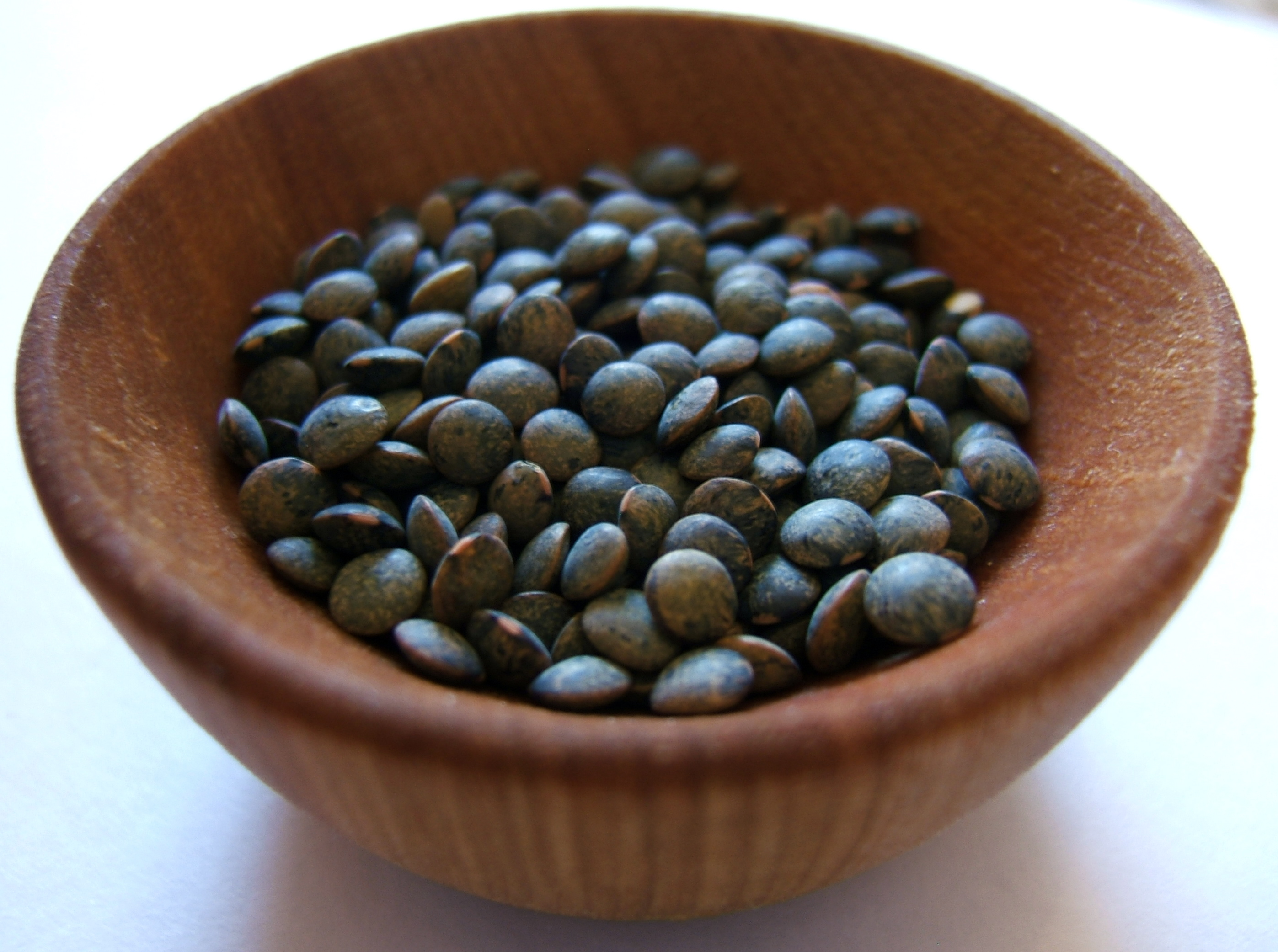
Puy lentils in a wooden bowl

Le Puy green lentil is a small, mottled, slate-grey to greenish lentil of the variety Lens esculenta var. puyensis (or L. culinaris var. puyensis). In the US, this type of lentil may be grown and sold as French green lentils or Puy lentils.

The term "Lentille verte du Puy" is protected throughout the European Union (EU) and UK as a Protected Designation of Origin (PDO), and in France as an appellation d'origine contrôlée (AOC). In the EU, the term may be used to designate only lentils grown in the prefecture of Le Puy (most notably in the commune of Le Puy-en-Velay) in the Auvergne region of France. These lentils have been grown in the region for more than 2,000 years and it is said that they have gastronomic qualities that come from the terroir (in this case attributed to the area's volcanic soil). They are praised for their unique peppery flavour and the ability to retain their shape after cooking.
