= Saint-Clément, Ardèche =

Saint-Clément
- Commune
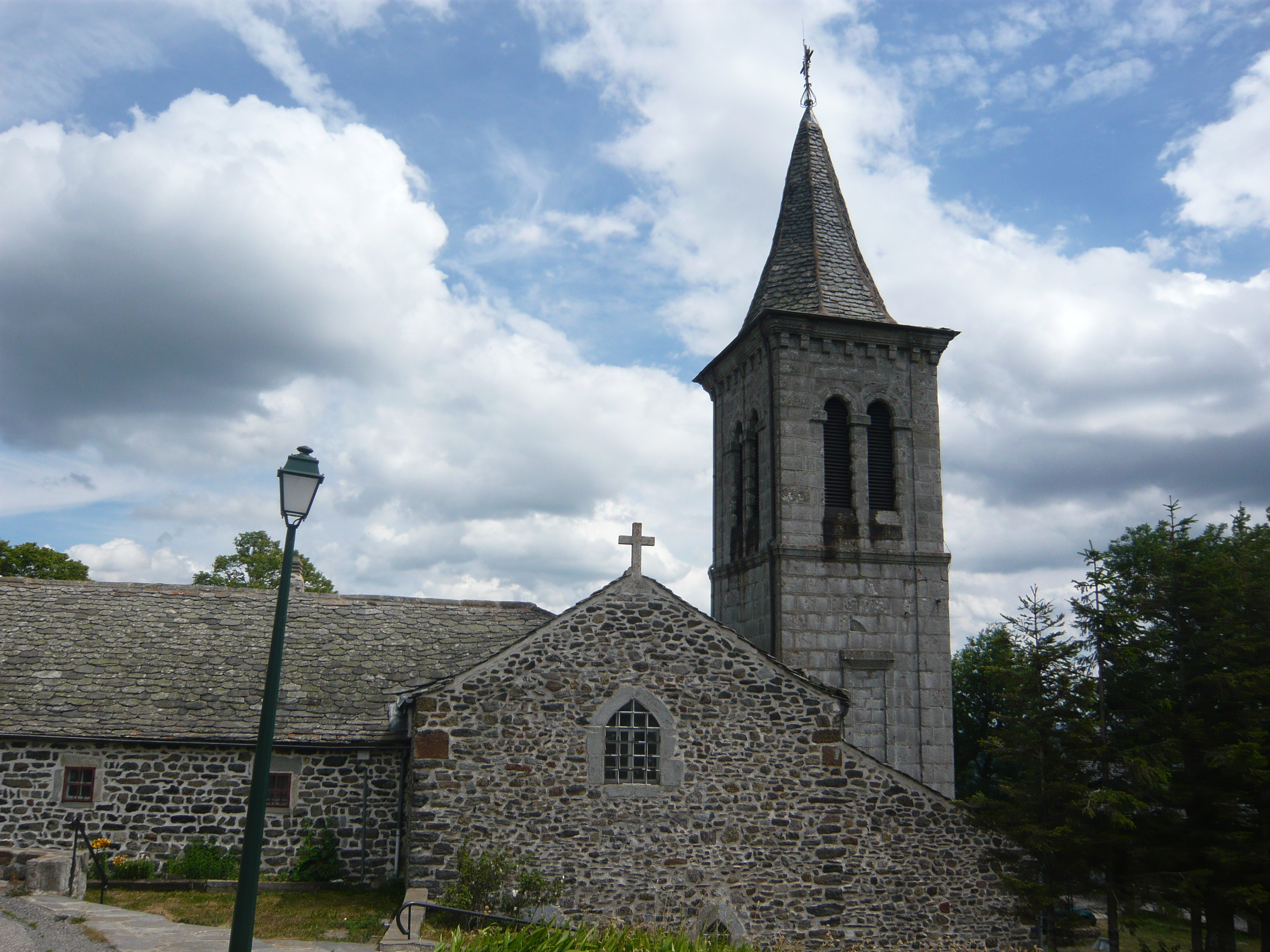
- The church in Saint-Clément
- Location of Saint-Clément
- Location within France Location within Auvergne-Rhône-Alpes
- Coordinates: 44°57′13″N 4°15′56″E
- Country: France
- Region: Auvergne-Rhône-Alpes
- Department: Ardèche
- Arrondissement: Tournon-sur-Rhône
- Canton: Haut-Eyrieux

Government
  - Mayor (2021–2026): Didier Bouet
- Area^{1}: 19.55 km^{2} (7.55 sq mi)
- Elevation: 1,153 m (3,783 ft)
- Highest elevation: 1,313 m (4,308 ft)
- Lowest elevation: 697 m (2,287 ft)
- Population (2023): 90
  - Density: 4.6/km^{2} (12/sq mi)
- Time zone: UTC+01:00 (CET)
  - Summer (DST): UTC+02:00 (CEST)
- INSEE/Postal code: 07226 /07310
- ^{1} French Land Register data, which excludes lakes, ponds, glaciers > 1 km^{2} (0.386 sq mi or 247 acres) and river estuaries.

Saint-Clément (French pronunciation: [sɛ̃ klemɑ̃]; Occitan: Sant Clamenç) is a commune in the Ardèche department in southern France.

== Population ==
Historical population
Year	Pop.	±% p.a.
1968	280	—
1975	209	−4.09%
1982	172	−2.75%
1990	118	−4.60%
1999	105	−1.29%
2007	101	−0.48%
2012	105	+0.78%
2017	86	−3.91%
2023	90	+0.76%
Source: INSEE

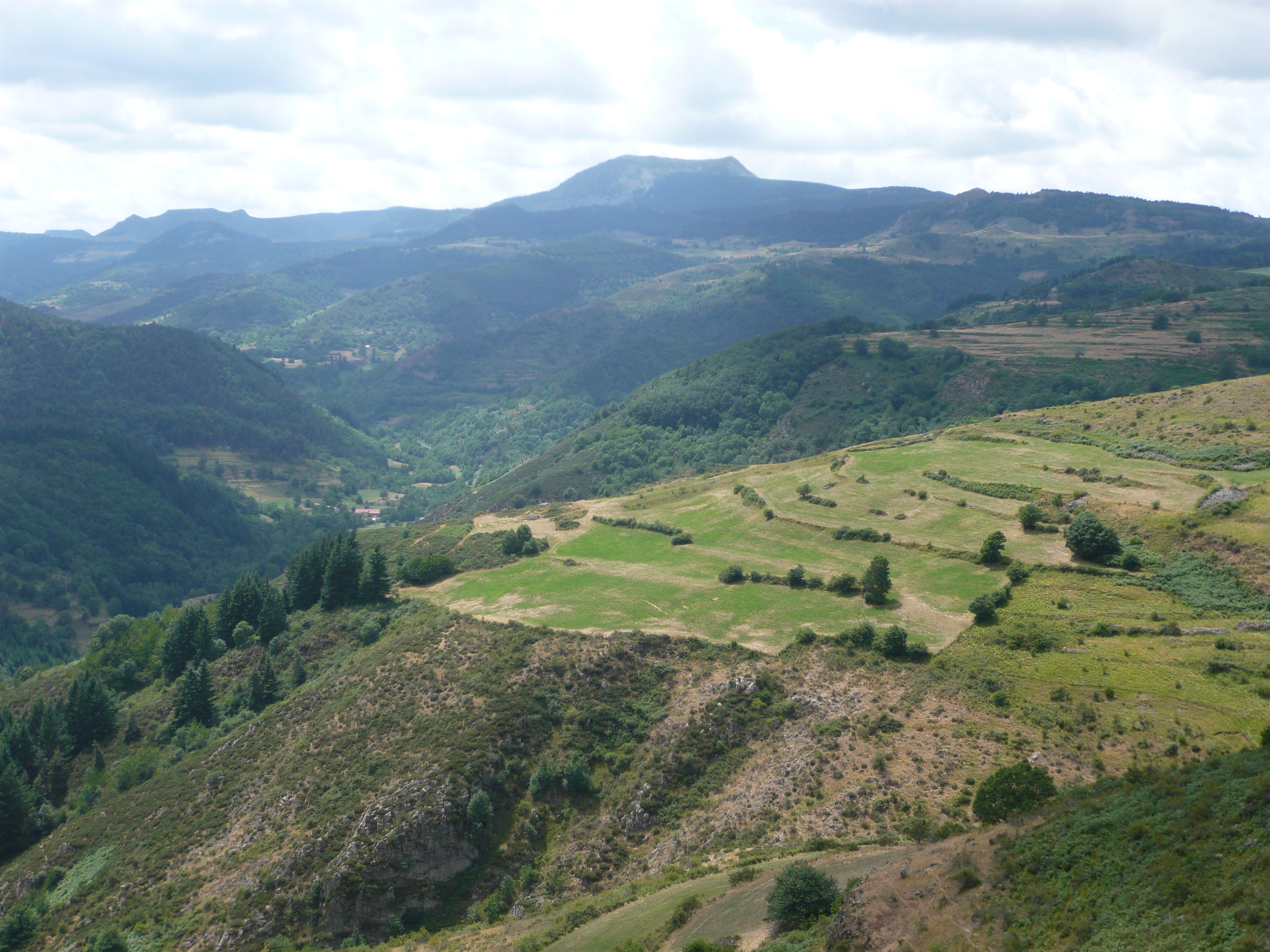
Landscapes of Saint-Clément

== See also ==
- Communes of the Ardèche department
