= Chaudeyrolles =

- Commune
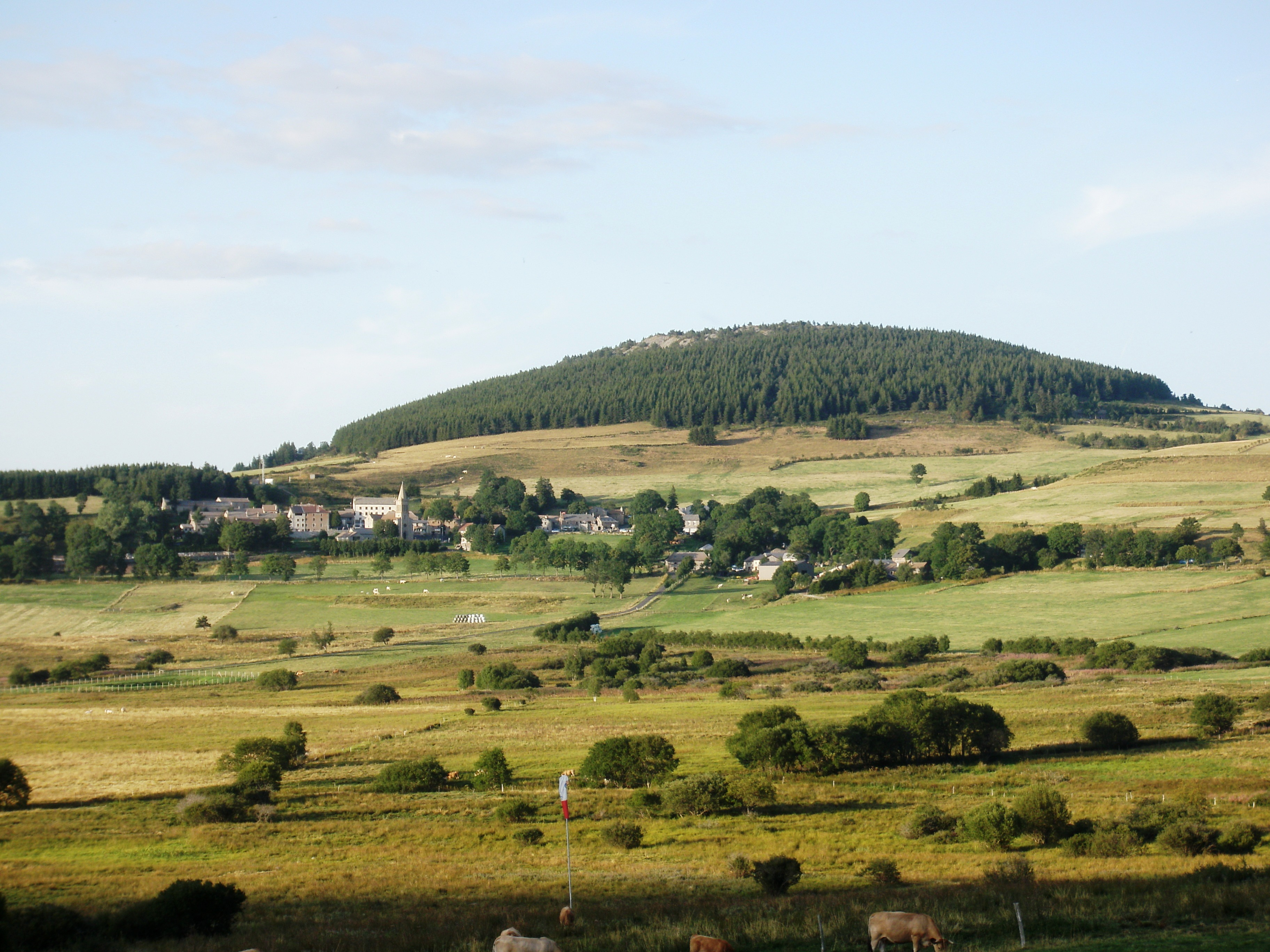
- Location of Chaudeyrolles
- Location within France Location within Auvergne-Rhône-Alpes
- Coordinates: 44°57′04″N 4°12′13″E
- Country: France
- Region: Auvergne-Rhône-Alpes
- Department: Haute-Loire
- Arrondissement: Le Puy-en-Velay
- Canton: Mézenc

Government
  - Mayor (2020–2026): Joël Devidal
- Area^{1}: 18.9 km^{2} (7.3 sq mi)
- Elevation: 1,280 m (4,200 ft)
- Highest elevation: 1,720 m (5,640 ft)
- Lowest elevation: 1,124 m (3,688 ft)
- Population (2023): 129
  - Density: 6.83/km^{2} (17.7/sq mi)
- Time zone: UTC+01:00 (CET)
  - Summer (DST): UTC+02:00 (CEST)
- INSEE/Postal code: 43066 /43430
- ^{1} French Land Register data, which excludes lakes, ponds, glaciers > 1 km^{2} (0.386 sq mi or 247 acres) and river estuaries.

Chaudeyrolles (French pronunciation: [ʃodeʁɔl]) is a commune in the Haute-Loire department in south-central France.

== Geography ==
The river Lignon du Velay has its source in the commune.

== Population ==
Historical population
Year	Pop.	±% p.a.
1968	306	—
1975	217	−4.79%
1982	162	−4.09%
1990	110	−4.72%
1999	108	−0.20%
2007	128	+2.15%
2012	101	−4.63%
2017	107	+1.16%
2023	129	+3.17%
Source: INSEE

== See also ==
- Communes of the Haute-Loire department
