= Pic du Lizieux =

Mountain in central France

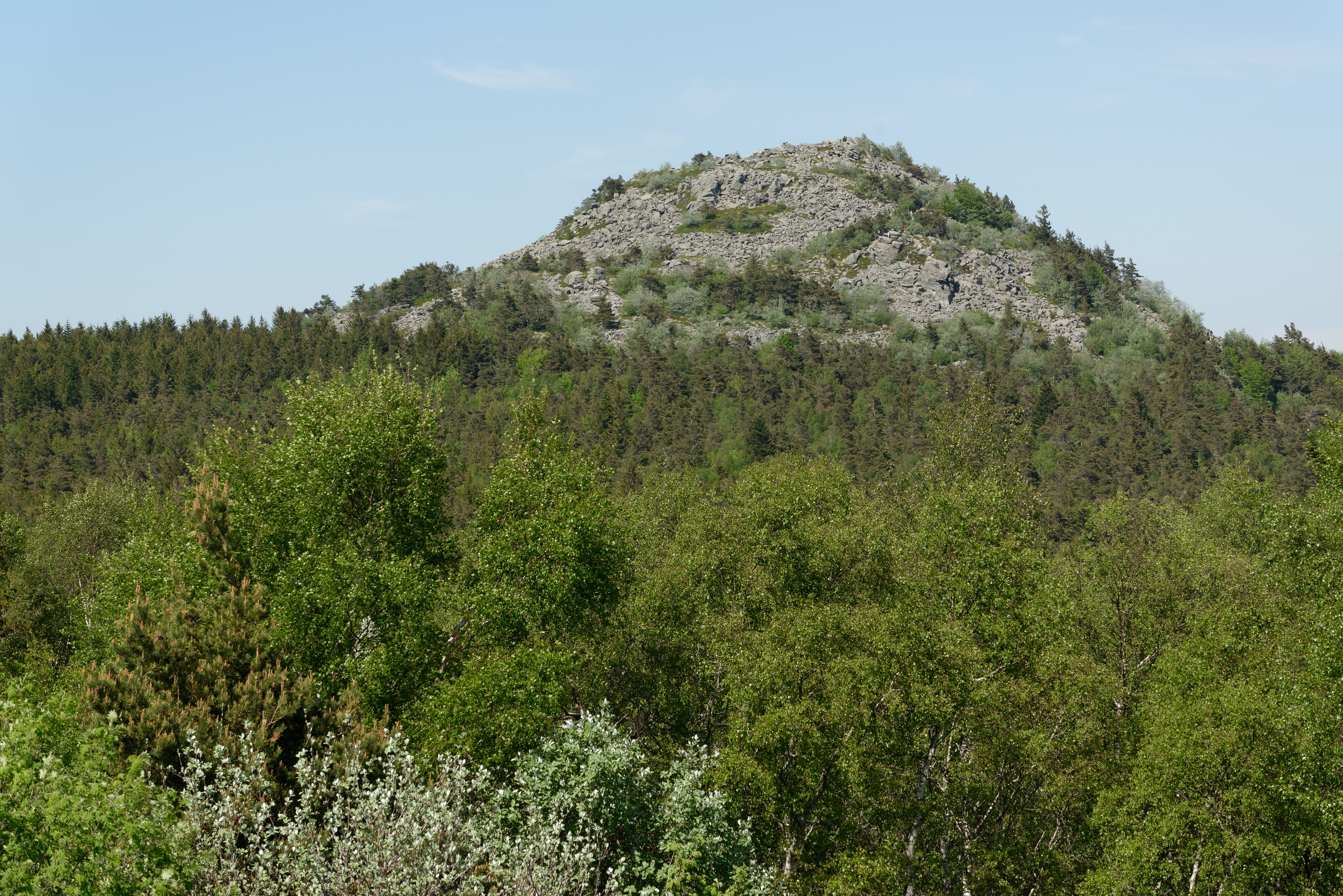
- View from the southwest.

Highest point
- Elevation: 1,386 m (4,547 ft)
- Coordinates: 45°03′42″N 4°11′45″E

Geography
- Location within France
- Location: Haute-Loire departement, France
- Parent range: Meygal (Massif Central)

The Pic du Lizieux is a summit to the east of the Meygal massif, reaching an altitude of 1,386 meters, located in the French commune of Araules, in Velay.

== Geography ==
=== Geology ===
The mountain is a volcanic dome with a geological formation composed of phonolite.

=== Flora ===
The mosaic of groves, scree slopes, and moorlands, in association with the vegetation formation of the Calamagrostis, defines an environment on the northeastern slope of Pic du Lizieux characterized by a high floristic richness, while also displaying a subalpine influence.

== Hiking ==
The Pic du Lizieux is accessible via the Bonas discovery trail.

An orientation table installed on July 12, 1970, provides a panoramic view of the high plateau of Mézenc, the Lignon, a large part of the "Pays des Sucs" and Meygal, and, depending on the clarity of the sky and absence of mist in the Vallée du Rhône, the Alps including Mont Blanc.

== Gallery ==
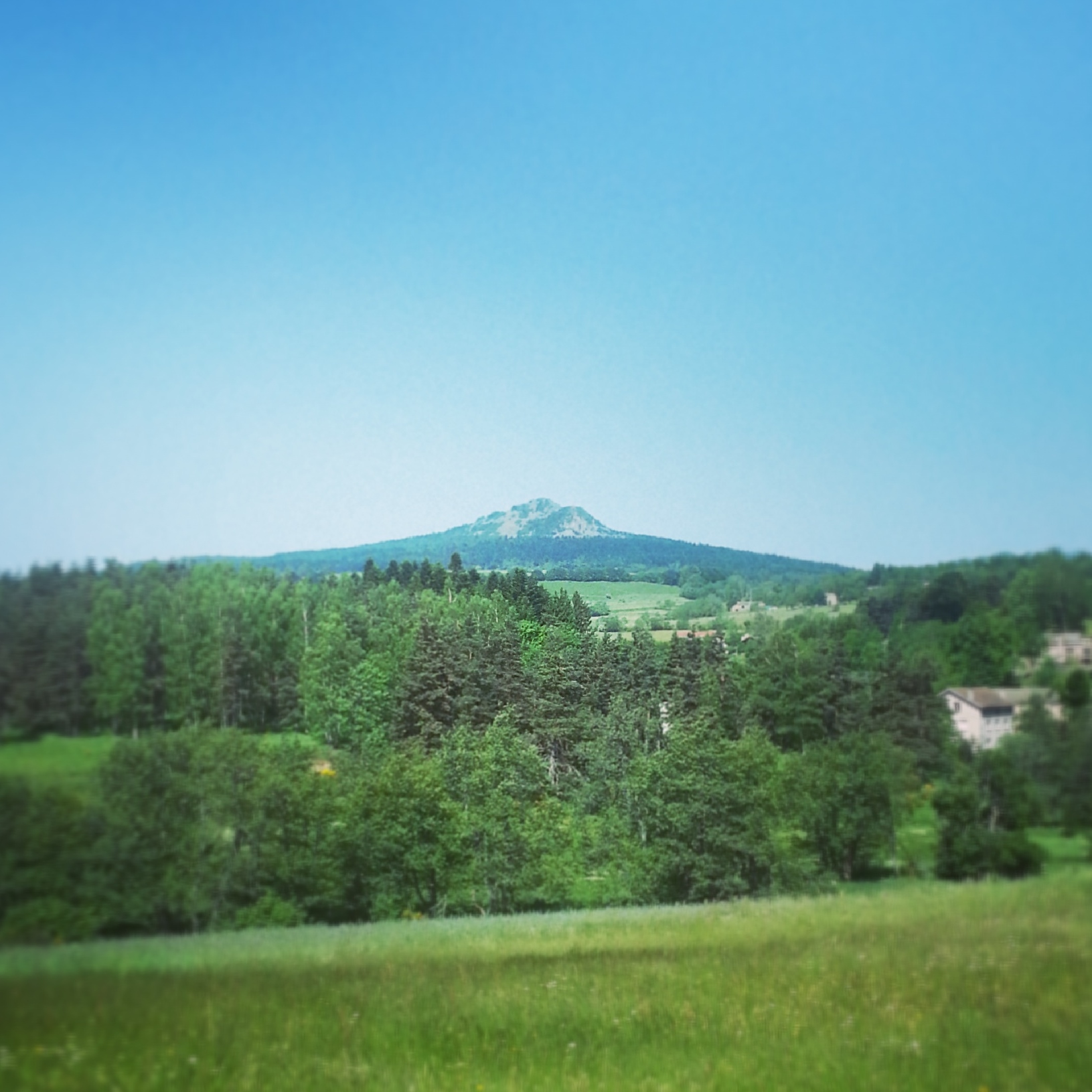
The Pic du Lizieux.

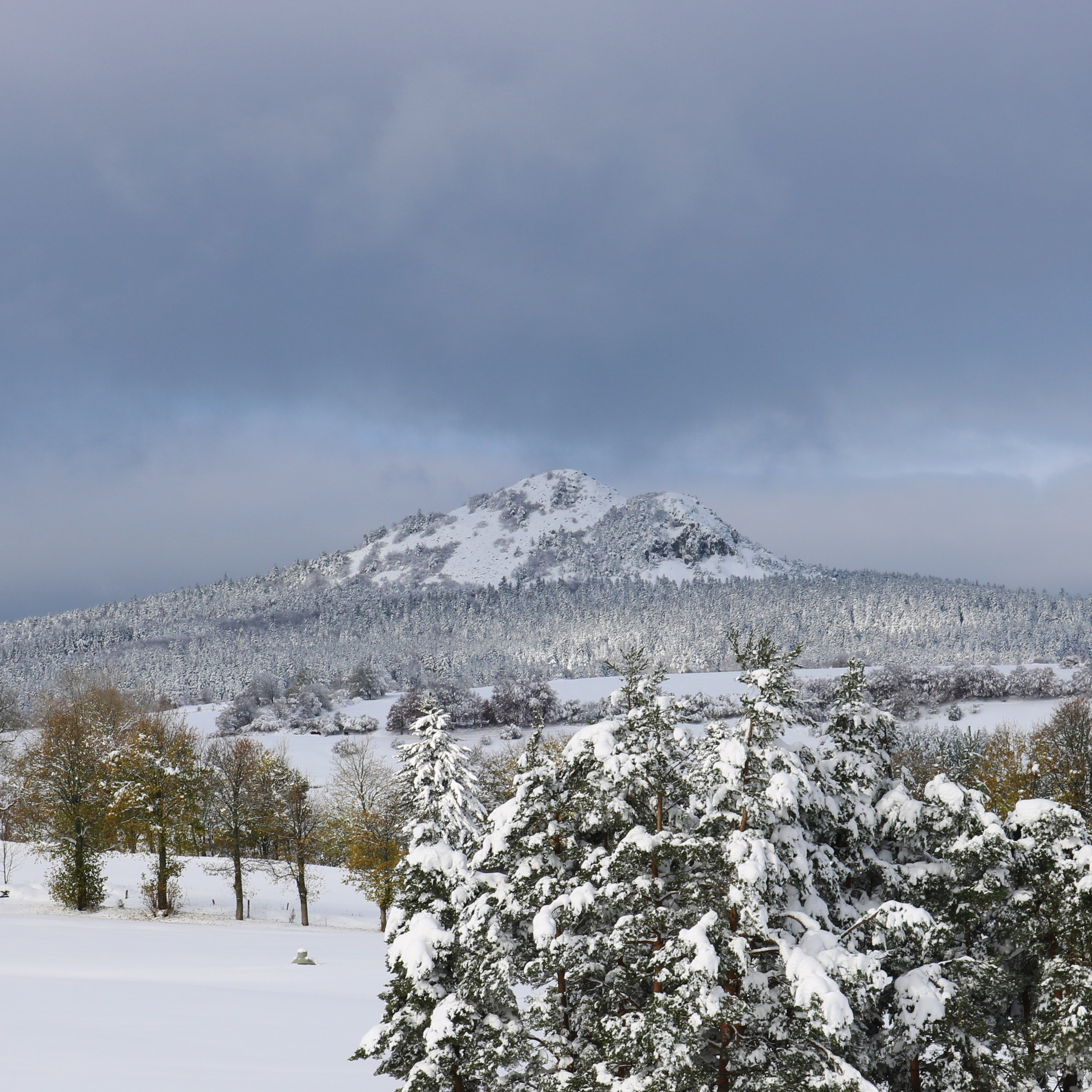
The Lizieux under the snow.

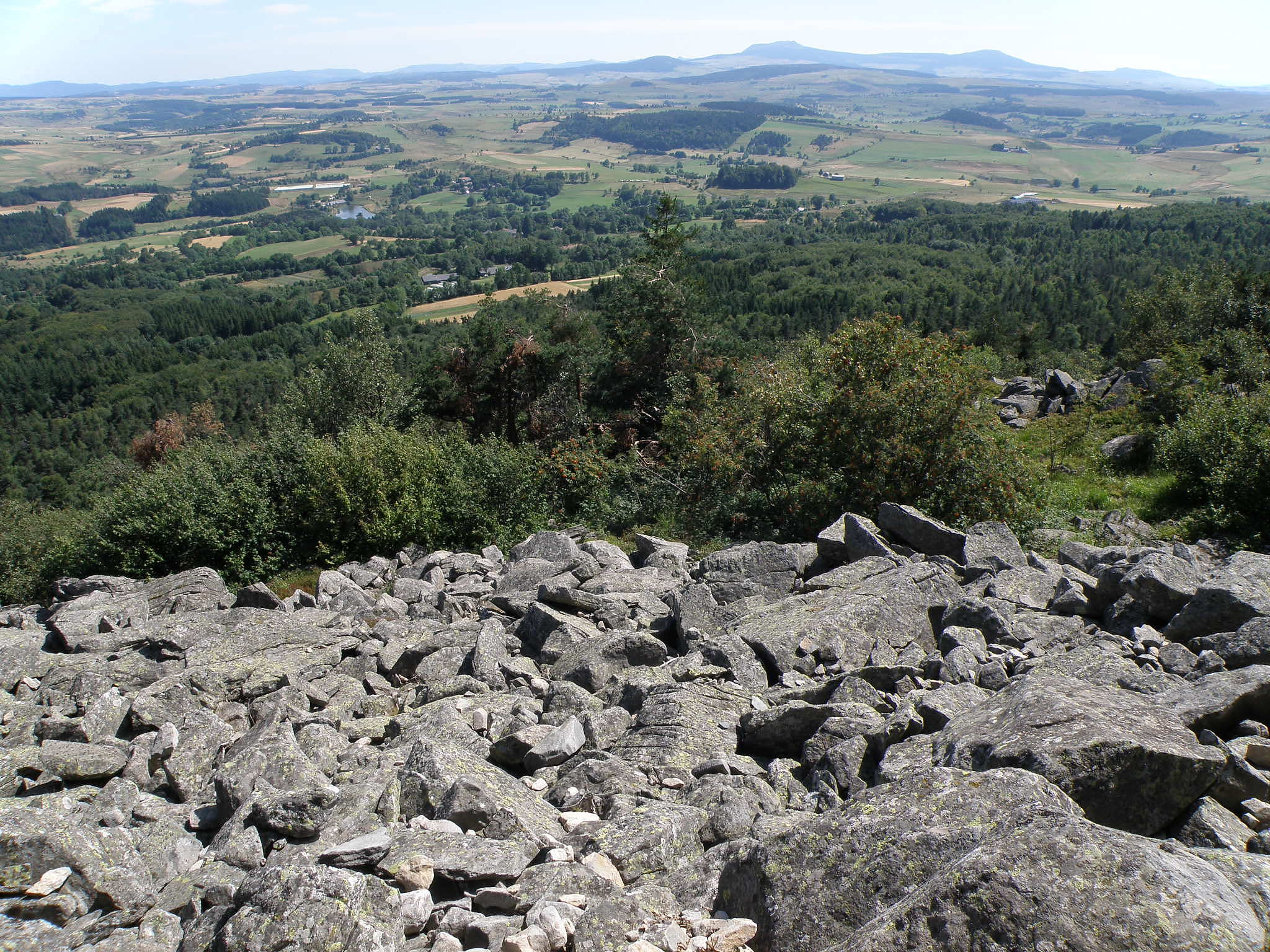
Panoramic view from Pic du Lizieux with Mont Mézenc in the background.
