= Devès Massif =

Volcanic plateau in France

Devès
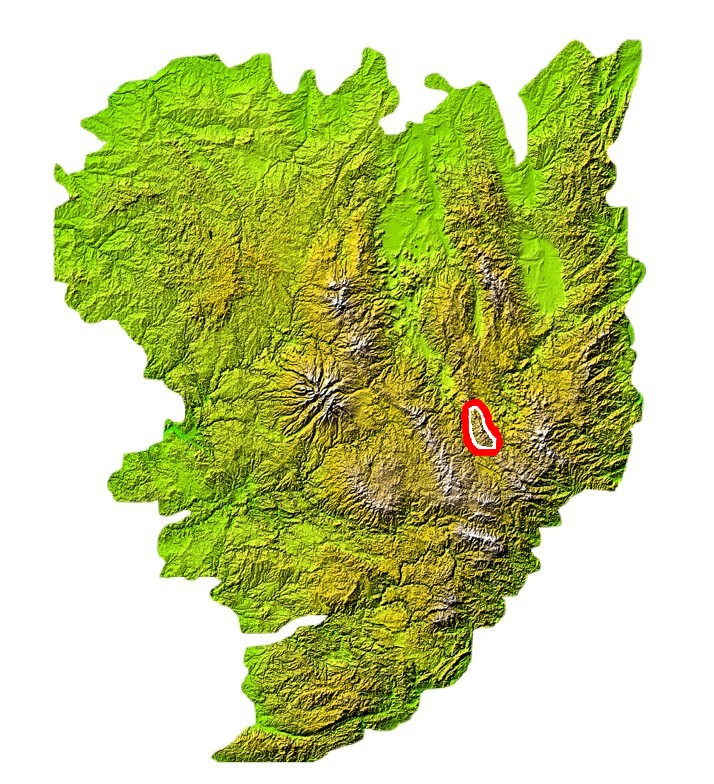
- Location map of Devès in the Massif Central

Highest point
- Elevation: 1,421 m (4,662 ft) at Mont Devès
- Coordinates: 44°56′25″N 3°45′55″E

Geography
- Location: Auvergne-Rhône-Alpes, France
- Parent range: Massif Central

The Devès Massif is a vast basalt plateau in the Velay mountains of the Massif Central, located in Haute-Loire, forming a natural region of France. It reaches its highest point at Mont Devès at an altitude of 1,421 meters.

== Toponomy ==
Devès is an Occitan term that refers to a "forbidden forest, protected," meaning it is not exploited.

== Geography ==
=== Location ===
The Devès is bordered to the west by the upper Allier valley and the Margeride mountains, to the north by the Livradois mountains, to the northeast by the Meygal massif, and to the east by the upper Loire valley and the Vivarais mountains.

=== Geology ===
The Devès Massif, which is more of a high plateau, is one of the three volcanic massifs of Velay, the other two being the Mézenc massif and the Meygal.

It is the largest basalt plateau in the Massif Central. The first eruptions are dated to 6 million years ago, but most of the volcanic activity occurred between 3.5 and 0.6 million years ago, with two peaks at 1 and 2 million years ago.

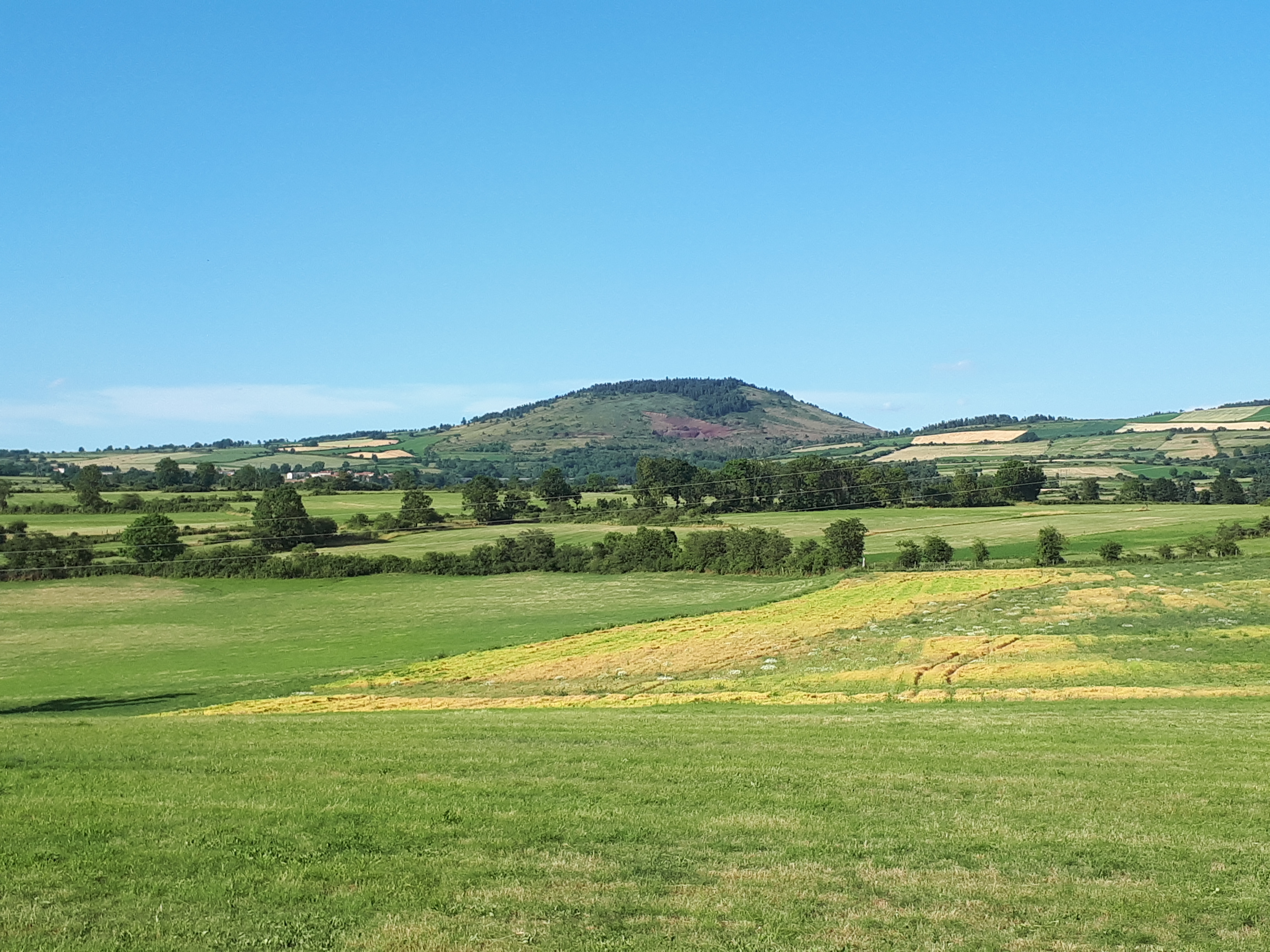
The Garde of Rauret

The surface of the plateau is covered with scoria cones of Strombolian origin. Some of these cones still retain their craters, similar to some maar craters, which are depressions occupied by spontaneous vegetation adapted to wet environments. The most emblematic of the plateau are Lac du Bouchet, the narces of La Sauvetat, and the Limagne marsh. The others are called "gardes." There are about 150 of them, forming either a chain of small forest-covered hills along a north–south axis or appearing as features in the middle of fields. Most have been cultivated at their base, leaving a forest cover (pines) at their summit or rocky outcrops.

=== Main summits ===
- Mont Devès, highest point of the massif at 1,421 m (4,662 ft)
- Mont Recours, 1,382 m (4,534 ft)
- Mont Tartas, 1,349 m (4,426 ft)
- Mont Farnier, 1,328 m (4,357 ft)
- Rang de la Garde, 1,326 m (4,350 ft)
- Champ Vestri, 1,321 m (4,334 ft)
- Mont Long, 1,317 m (4,321 ft)
- La Durande, 1,299 m (4,262 ft)
- Mont Maillon, 1,291 m (4,236 ft)
- La Vesseyre, 1,279 m (4,196 ft)
- Rocher de la Fagette, 1,265 m (4,150 ft)
- Montchaud, 1,243 m (4,078 ft)
- Montpignon, 1,230 m (4,040 ft)
- Mont Burel, 1,227 m (4,026 ft)
- Suc de Combret, 1,232 m (4,042 ft)
- Côte Rousse, 1,218 m (3,996 ft)
- Le Pouzat, 1,208 m (3,963 ft)
- Montjus, 1,122 m (3,681 ft)
- Suc de Miceselle, 1,115 m (3,658 ft)
- La Garde de Tallobre, 1,069 m (3,507 ft)
- La Garde des Ceyssoux, 1,064 m (3,491 ft)
- Mont Briançon, 1,045 m (3,428 ft)

=== Climate ===
The climate is cold but relatively dry; the Mounts of Cantal and Margeride provide a sheltered position leading to reduced precipitation (about 850 mm/year on average). In winter, snow remains on the ground for several months, and the forests and pastures are swept by the "burle," the local name for the blizzard.

=== Fauna and flora ===
The Devès Massif is characterized by a balanced landscape of grassland and cultivated systems. Its forest cover rate of 22% is lower than the average for the Massif Central due to the clearing of ancient forests over the past 150 years. The area has the highest number of plant species in the department, with particularly rich flora and the presence of rare plants such as Neslia paniculata subsp. thracica, Camelina microcarpa, and Ranunculus lingua, which are critically endangered in Auvergne.
