= Mountains of Mezenc =

Mountain range in France

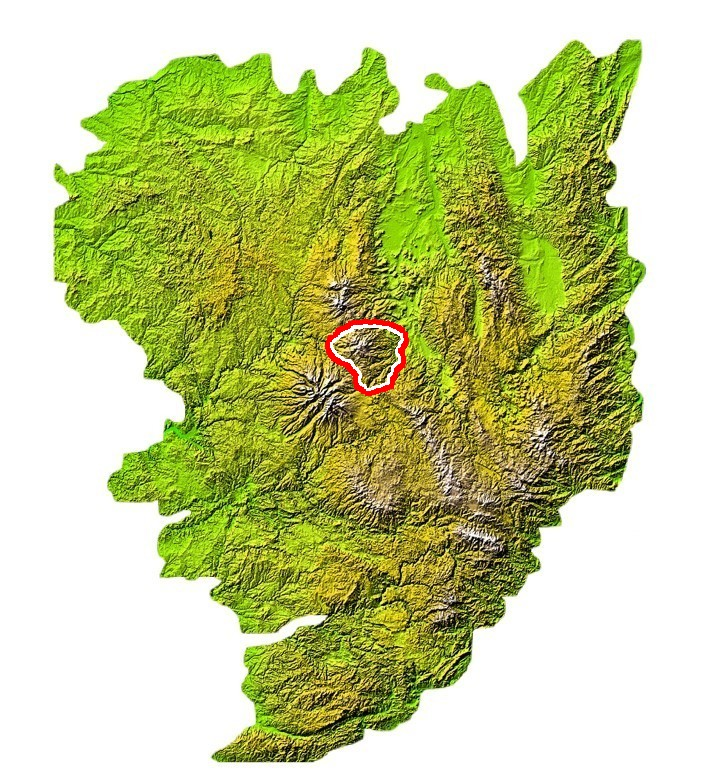
- Location map of Mountains of Mezenc in the Massif Central.

Highest point
- Elevation: 1,753 m (5,751 ft) at Mont Mézenc
- Coordinates: 44.91098°N 4.190863°E

Geography
- Location: Auvergne-Rhône-Alpes, France
- Parent range: Massif Central

The Mont Mézenc is a mountain range in the Massif Central, bordering the departments of Ardèche and Haute-Loire, making up a natural region of France. Its highest point is Mount Mézenc, whose two summits, South and North, are respectively the highest in Ardèche at 1,753 meters and Haute-Loire at 1,744 meters.

== Toponymy ==
The Mont Mézenc massif separated two Celtic peoples: the Vellavii and the Helvii. This situation is undoubtedly at the origin of its name, which is derived from the pre-Latin word mège, like other primitive frontiers such as Mèje, Mèjane, Montmège, Montméa, Medze, Mezenc, etc.

The highest point of this mountain range is called Puei-Vuei. It wasn't until the mid-18th century that Puei-Vuei began to be referred to as Mont Mézenc, under the influence of the Montilian volcanologist Barthélemy Faujas de Saint-Fond.

== Geography ==
=== Location ===
The Mont Mézenc lies on the border of the two départements of Ardèche and Haute-Loire, and the former provinces of Vivarais and Velay. It is surrounded by the following natural regions:

- the Haut-Vivarais mountains to the north
- to the west by the Meygal massif
- the Ardèche plateau to the south
- to the east, by the Boutières massif, which forms the greater part of the Vivarais mountains
- The massif is largely integrated into the Monts d'Ardèche regional nature park.

Being split between two départements, formerly two administrative regions, two former provinces, two different traditions (Catholic and Protestant), being far from major communication routes and not having a major urban center has contributed to this region's low profile and lack of a strong identity. It is, however, a clearly differentiated geographical entity.

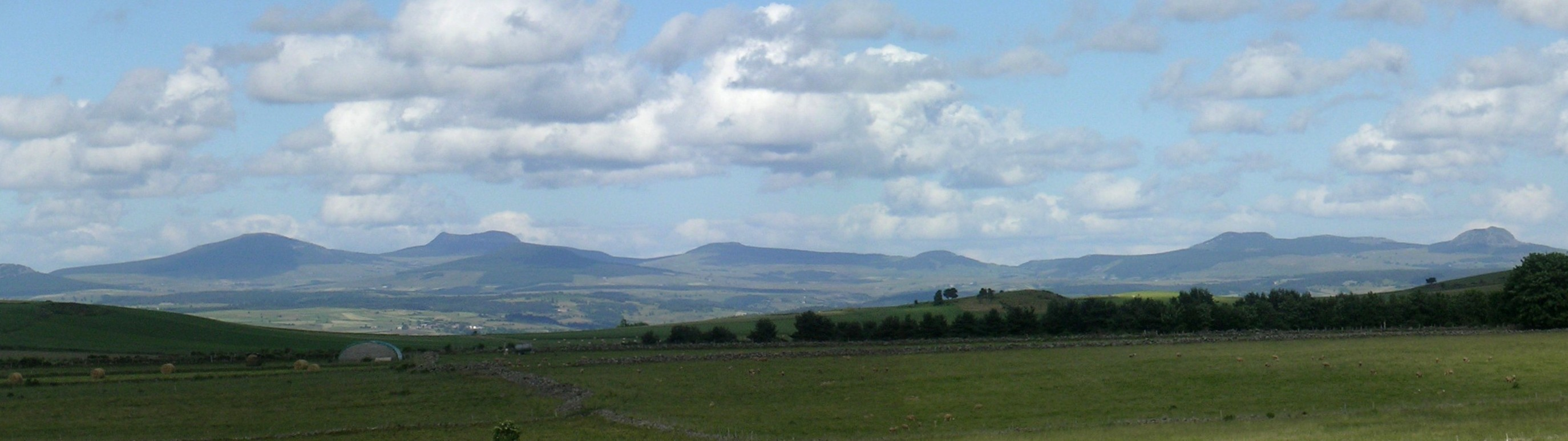
View of the Mezenc Massif from the Devès Massif. In the center, Mont Mézenc and on the far right, Montfol.

== Topography ==
=== Main peaks ===
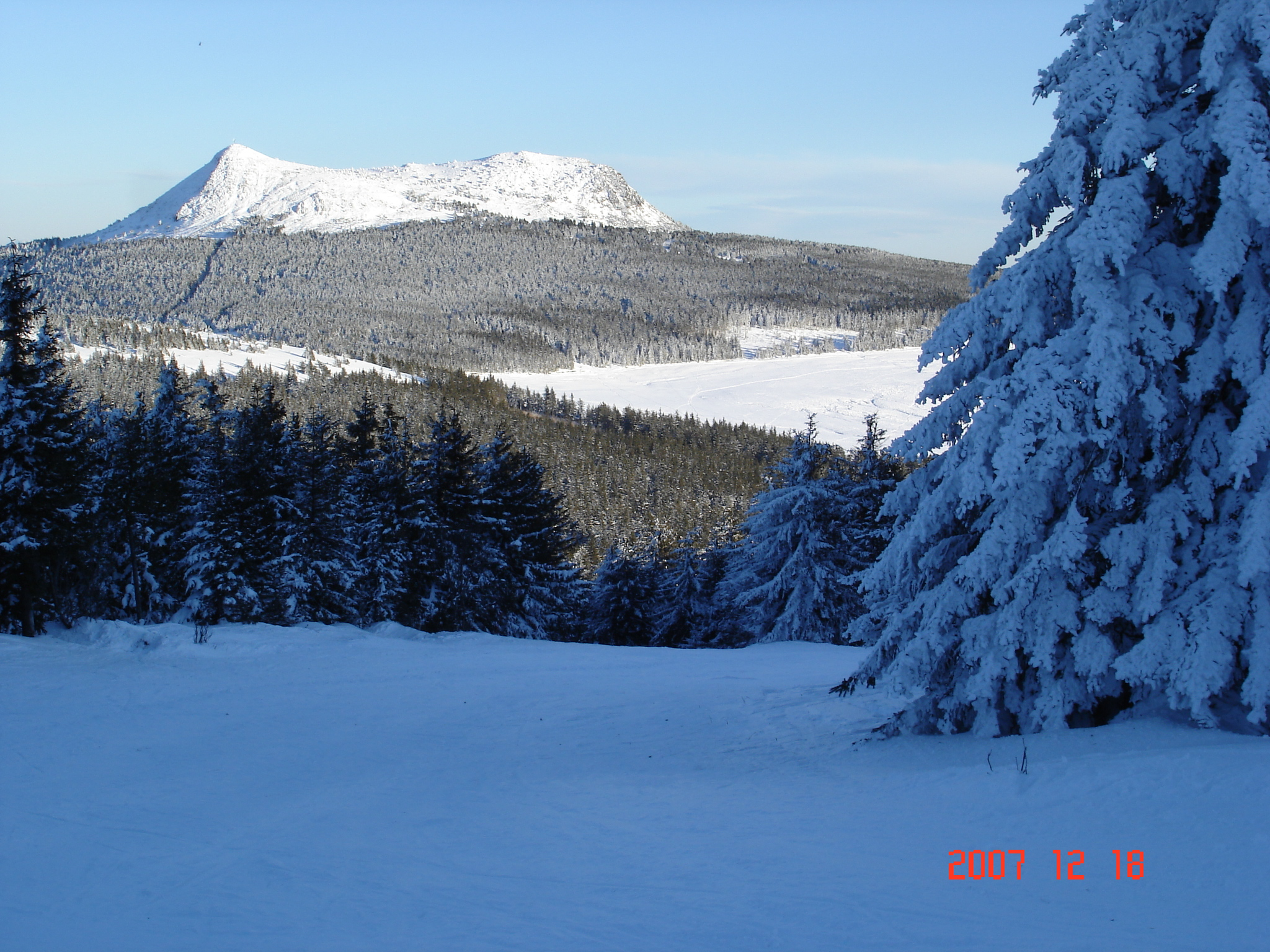
Mount Mezenc.

The massif's highest peak is Mont Mézenc, which has two peaks: the highest, located in the south in Ardèche, rises to 1,753 m, while the second rises to 1,744 m and is in Haute-Loire. But the best-known peak is certainly Mont Gerbier-de-Jonc, where the source of the Loire is located.

Other peaks include Mont Mézenc or Puei-Vuei (1,753 meters) and Mont Gerbier de Jonc (1,551 meters).

=== Geology ===
In the Tertiary era (Miocene), Alpine folding fractured the Hercynian basement of the Massif Central. Along the fracture lines, volcanoes appeared in several stages up to the Quaternary era. Such is the case of the volcanoes of the Mézenc massif. The sucs de Sara, the suc de Touron, Mont Gerbier-de-Jonc and Mont d'Alambre are Péléen volcanoes. They have a characteristic dome shape, and their rock is essentially phonolite. Mont Mézenc has two peaks. It is the result of several outbursts of magma. To the south, the cirque des Boutières is a crater left over from a volcanic explosion.

=== Hydrography ===
The Loire rises in the massif. This forms the watershed with the Rhône basin.

=== Climate ===
The region has a marked mountain climate. In winter, the forests and pastures are swept by burle, the local name for blizzard.

=== Fauna and flora ===
The Mezenc's main natural habitats are beech forests, grasslands, heaths and peat bogs. The flora is rich and rare. Some thirty protected species can be found here.

=== Population ===
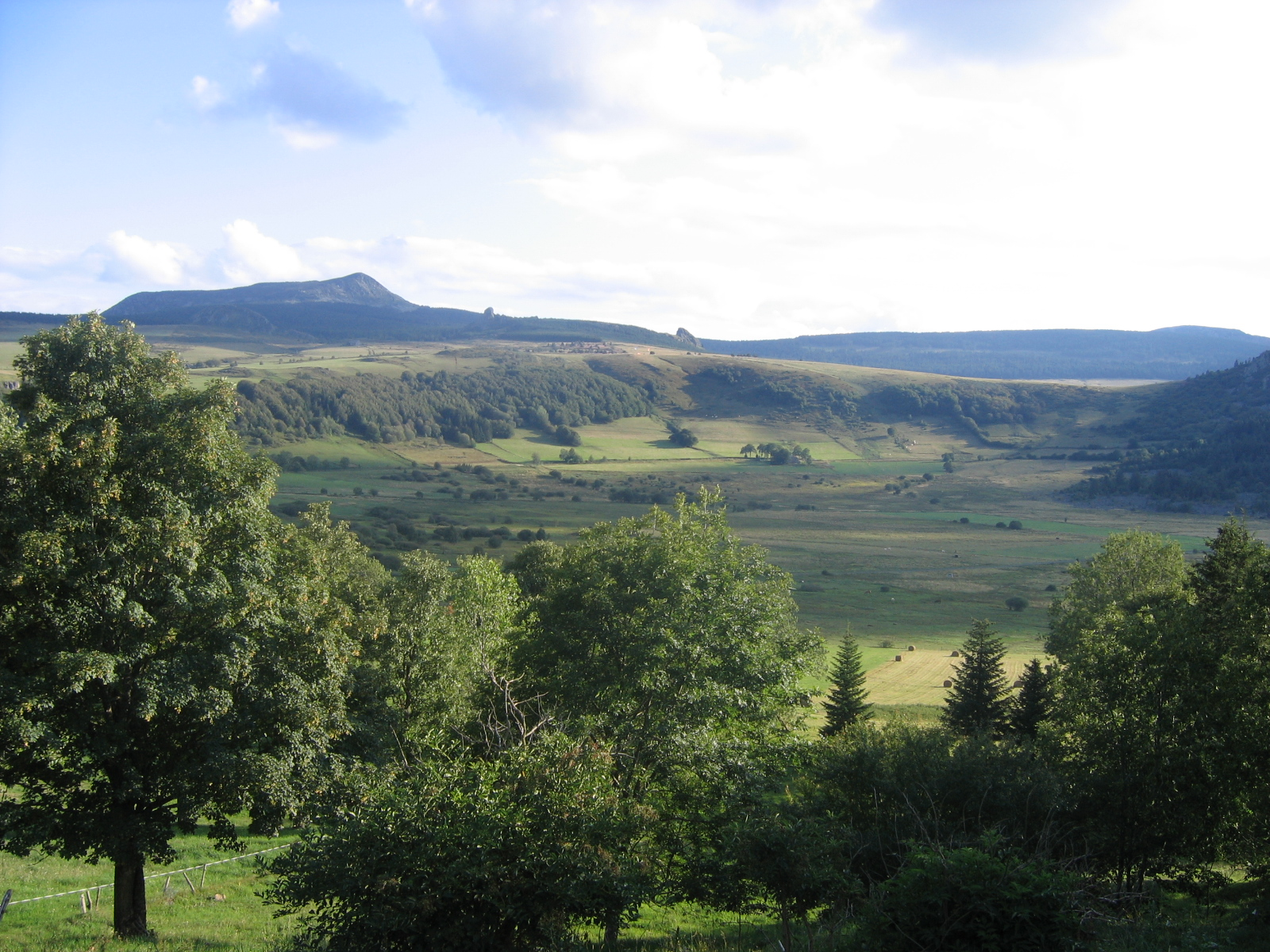
Mount Mézenc from the commune of Chaudeyrolles.

The massif is sparsely populated, with only 4,200-year-round residents, or 9 inhabitants per km². The population declined sharply throughout the 20th century, dropping by a third between 1975 and 1990. Today, it is tending to stabilize.

== History ==
Palynology shows that cereal cultivation dates back to the Final Neolithic, around 2500 BC. In Antiquity, the massif formed the border between the Gallo-Roman cities of Alba and Saint-Paulien, while in the Middle Ages, it separated the dioceses of Viviers (Ardèche) and Le Puy (Haute-Loire).

The Mezenc forest, established in the late 19th century, is a typical example of an RTM forest, designed to stabilize and restore sloping soils.

During the Second World War, the massif was a refuge for children hunted down by Nazi forces and their collaborators, becoming a bastion of civil resistance.

== Activities ==
=== Agriculture ===
Agriculture accounts for one in two jobs. There were 650 farms in 1988, and certainly around 400 today, operating 22,000 ha of farmland, 95% of which is covered by permanent grassland. This agriculture is exclusively focused on livestock farming, mainly suckler cattle (18,000 head), but also dairy cows (around 6,000) and sheep.

Cattle breeders benefit from a quality appellation in the region: the AOC Fin gras du Mézenc, one of four beef AOCs in France. In 2013, this appellation was produced by 80 breeders in the Ardèche mountains and Haute-Loire.

=== Tourism ===
After agriculture, the second major activity on the massif is tourism.

The Mezenc plateau is a vast Nordic ski area. A small ski resort, both downhill and cross-country, is located in Les Estables. It offers skiing on Mont d'Alambre and on the edge of the Mézenc. It's also the starting point for the Ardèche mountain traverse, a hike that can be completed on skis.

Mont Gerbier-de-Jonc is particularly popular, and is visited by around 300,000 people every year.

The region is criss-crossed by the GR 7, GR 73 and GR 40 long-distance hiking trails, and the PR58 and PR205 short-distance hiking trails.

The Carthusian monastery of Bonnefoy comprised very large buildings. It was destroyed by fire in 1653. What remains today is the prior's house and the bell tower.

No fewer than 14,000 beds are made available on the massif during the tourist season.

=== Environmental protection ===
The Massif du Mézenc site has been classified under the law of May 12 1930 for its great landscape interest. The appearance of the site can only be modified with the authorization of the Ministry of the Environment and the Prefect. It covers the communes of Le Béage, Borée, La Rochette, Chaudeyrolles, Les Estables and Saint-Front, with a total surface area of 4,300 hectares. The Ardèche part of the site is included in the Monts d'Ardèche Regional Nature Park.

It is also a national biological reserve.

== Bibliography ==
- Bret, François. "Le Mézenc-Meygal en tant que paysage forestier : Éléments d'analyse d'un espace géographique". Cahiers de la Haute-Loire.
- Petiot, Jean-Claude (1979). "Une zone agricole de montagne : le plateau du Mézenc". Cahiers de la Haute-Loire.
- Nicolas, Roger (1980). "L'architecture rurale sur le plateau du Mézenc". Cahiers de la Haute-Loire.
- Chervalier, Jean (1981). "Les chaumières du Velay de 1650 à nos jours". Cahiers de la Haute-Loire.
- Haond, Laurent (2022). "Les maîtres lauzeurs du massif Mézenc-Gerbier, artisans-artistes des hauts plateaux de l'Ardèche : dans un cahier consacré aux métiers d'art en Ardèche". Cahier de Mémoire d'Ardèche et Temps Présent.

== See also ==
- Massif Central
- Velay mountains
- Mont Mézenc
- Volcanic rock
