= Velay mountains =

Mountain range in France

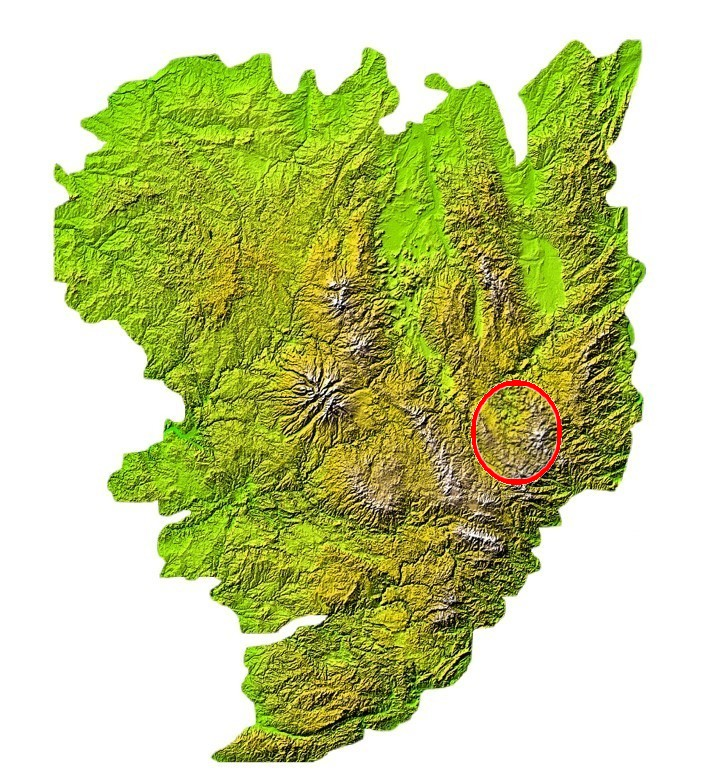
- Location map of Velay mountains in the Massif Central.

Highest point
- Elevation: 1,753 m (5,751 ft) at Mont Mézenc

Geography
- Location: Auvergne-Rhône-Alpes, France
- Parent range: Massif Central

The Velay mountains are the mountain ranges located in the former French province of Velay. They are situated in the eastern two-thirds of the Haute-Loire department, in the southern part of the Auvergne-Rhône-Alpes region, and in the east-central part of the Massif Central.

== Geography ==
Velay has three main mountain ranges:

- The Devès Massif, located in the west and south of Velay and in the center of the Haute-Loire department;
- The Meygal, a volcanic massif located in the east;
- The Mézenc massif, which borders the Ardèche department and is only partially located in Velay.

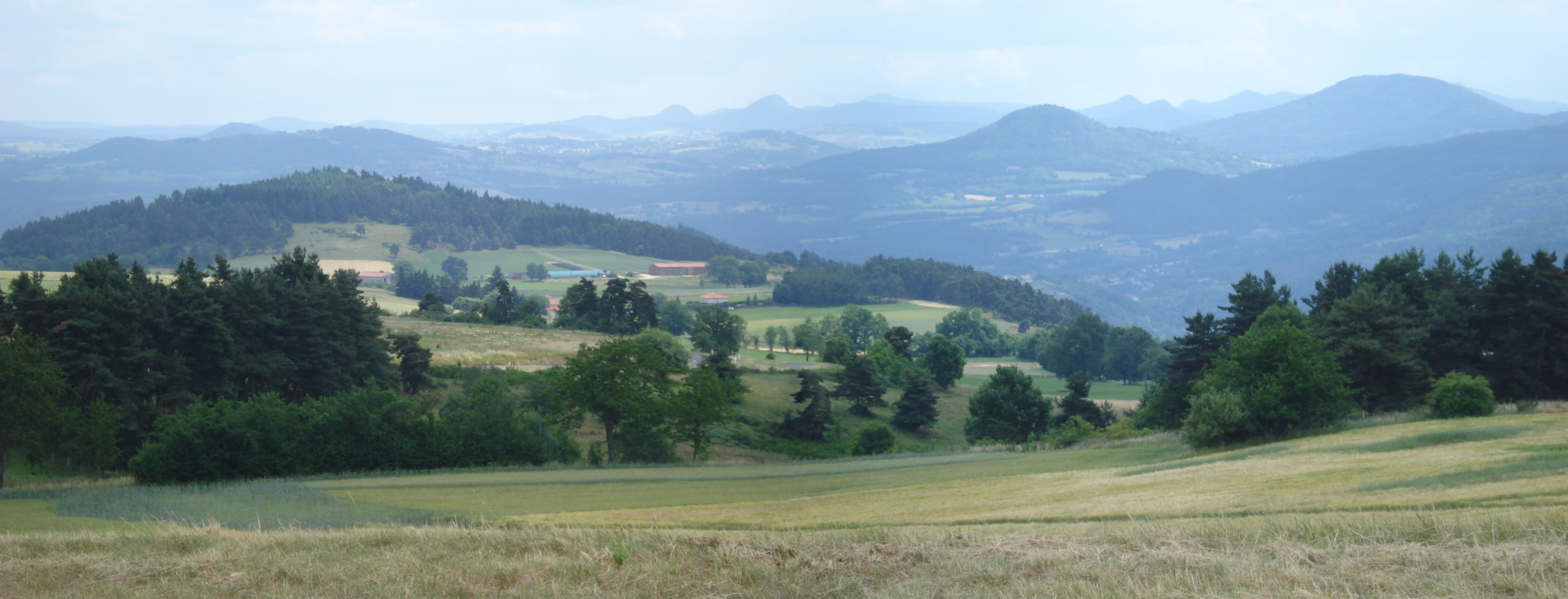
Panoramic view from Saint-Maurice-de-Roche towards the Velay mountains.
