= La Durande =

Mountain in central France

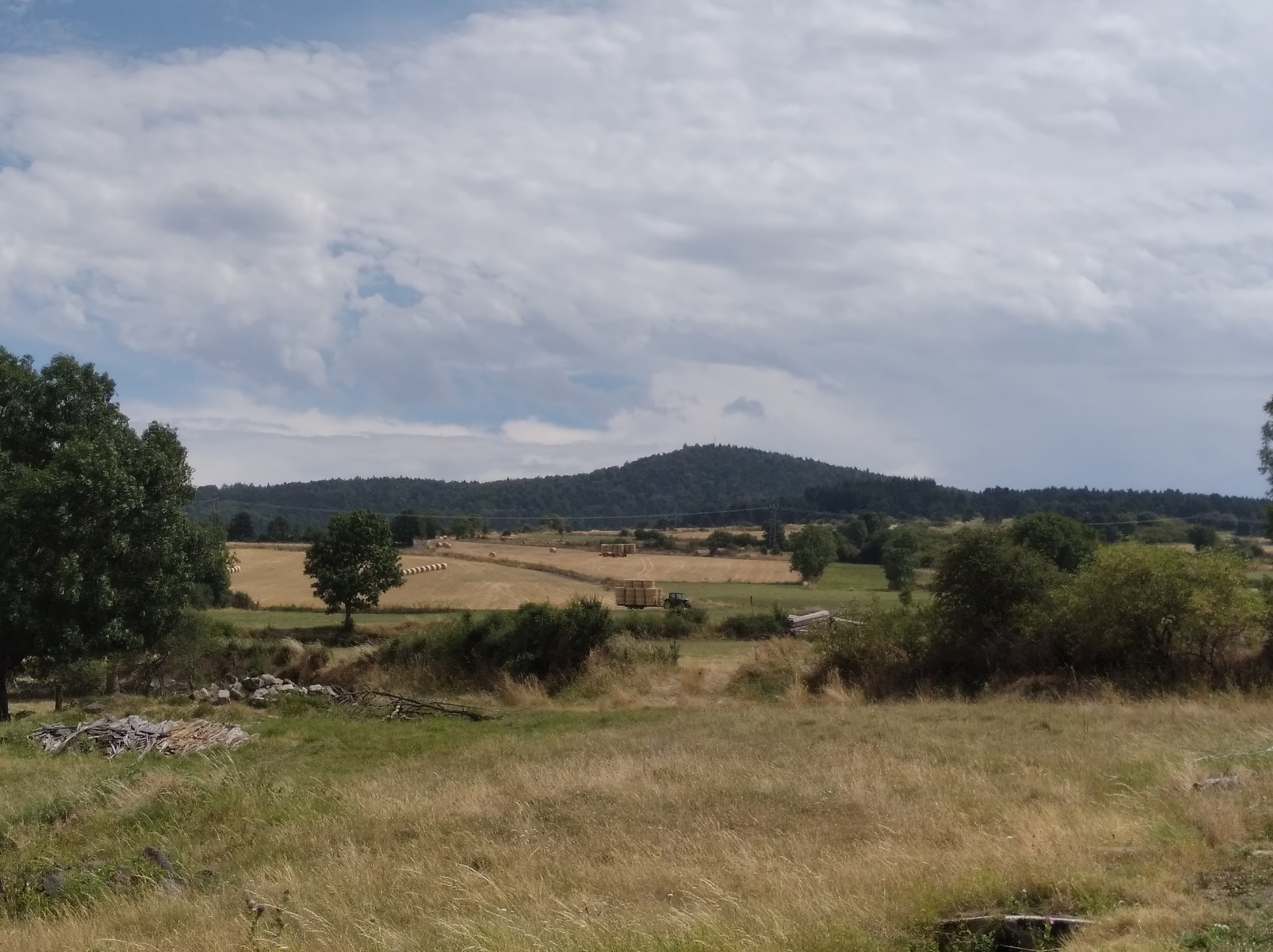
- La Durande seen from the hamlet of Combret.

Highest point
- Elevation: 1,299 m (4,262 ft)
- Coordinates: 45°02′56″N 3°38′59″E

Geography
- Location within France
- Location: Haute-Loire departement, France
- Parent range: Devès Massif (Massif Central)

La Durande, a lava dome, is one of the highest volcanic peaks in France and peaks at 1,299 metres.

It rises from the Limagne valley and dominates the local area. An oak cross marked at the peak for centuries, however after the wooden cross was destroyed by storm, the commune replaced it with a larger stone cross, with a map and viewpoint erected in the 1990s.
