= Perdrix =

Perdrix may refer to:

- Perdrix (film), a 2019 French film
- French corvette Perdrix (1784)
- Pied De Perdrix, a synonym for the malbec grape
- Oeil de perdrix, a rosé wine produced in Switzerland
- Perdrix Formation, a geologic formation of Late Devonian (Frasnian) age in the Western Canada Sedimentary Basin
- Crêt de la Perdrix, summit of Mont Pilat in France

== People with the surname ==
- Jean Perdrix, French film director
- Roger Perdrix (born 1943), Canadian football player

== See also ==
- Perdrix River (disambiguation)
