= Mont Devès =

Mountain in central France

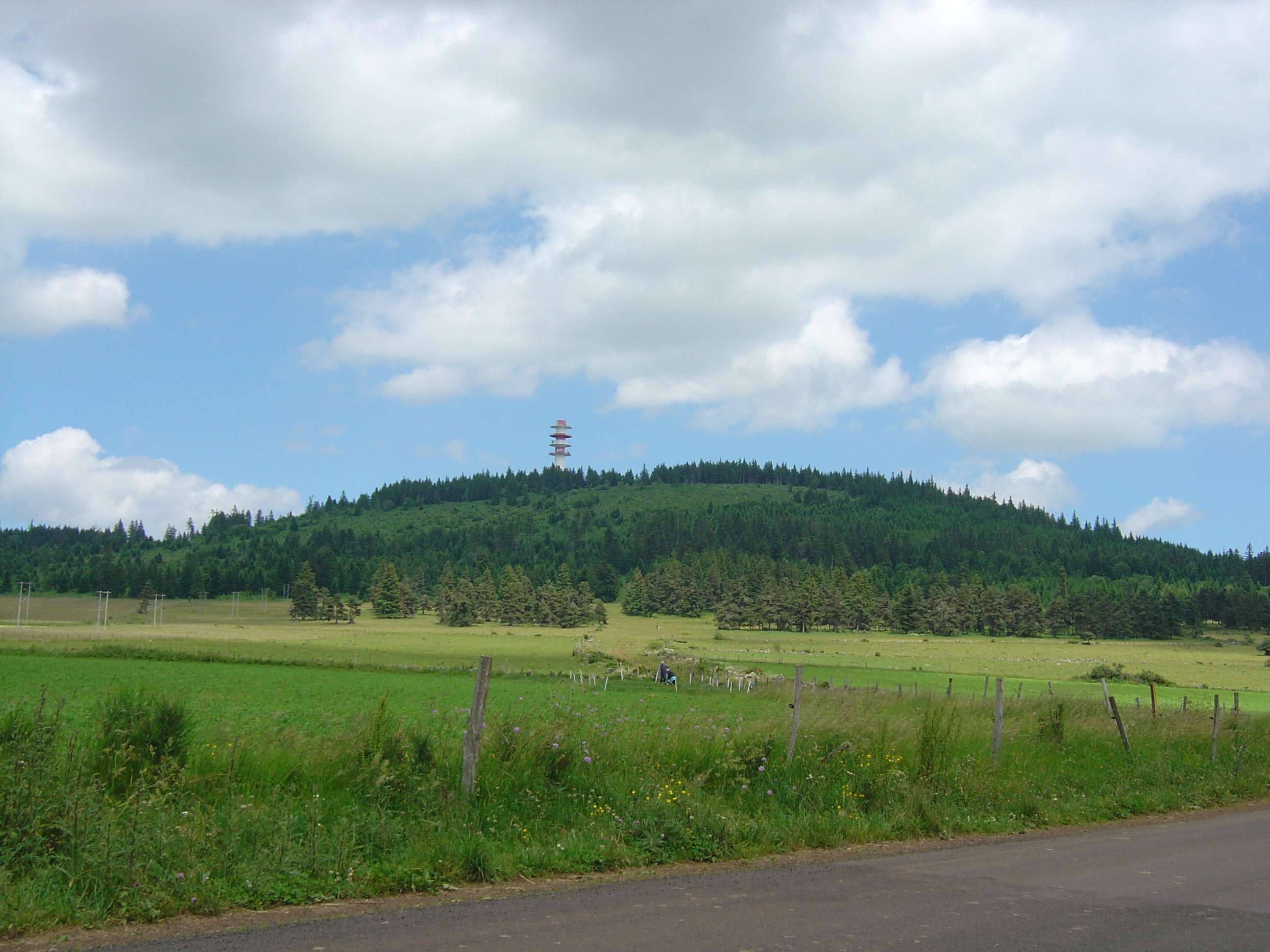

Highest point
- Elevation: 1,421 m (4,662 ft)
- Coordinates: 44°56′25″N 3°45′54″E

Geography
- Location within France
- Location: Haute-Loire departement, France
- Parent range: Devès Massif (Massif Central)

Mont Devès is a volcanic peak reaching an altitude of 1,421 meters in the French department of Haute-Loire. It is the highest point of the Devès Massif in the Massif Central.

== Geography ==
Mont Devès is located in the Devès Massif, where it is the highest point, within the Massif Central. A relay antenna is situated at its summit.

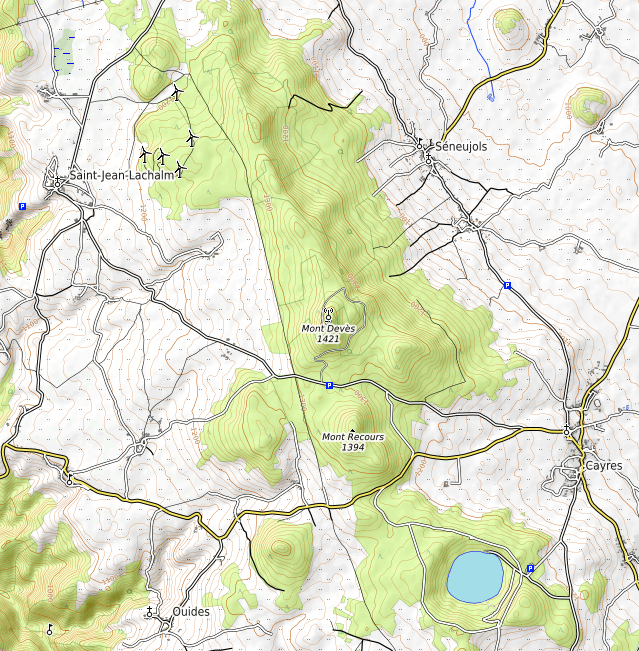
Topographic map
