= Testavoyre =

Mountain in central France

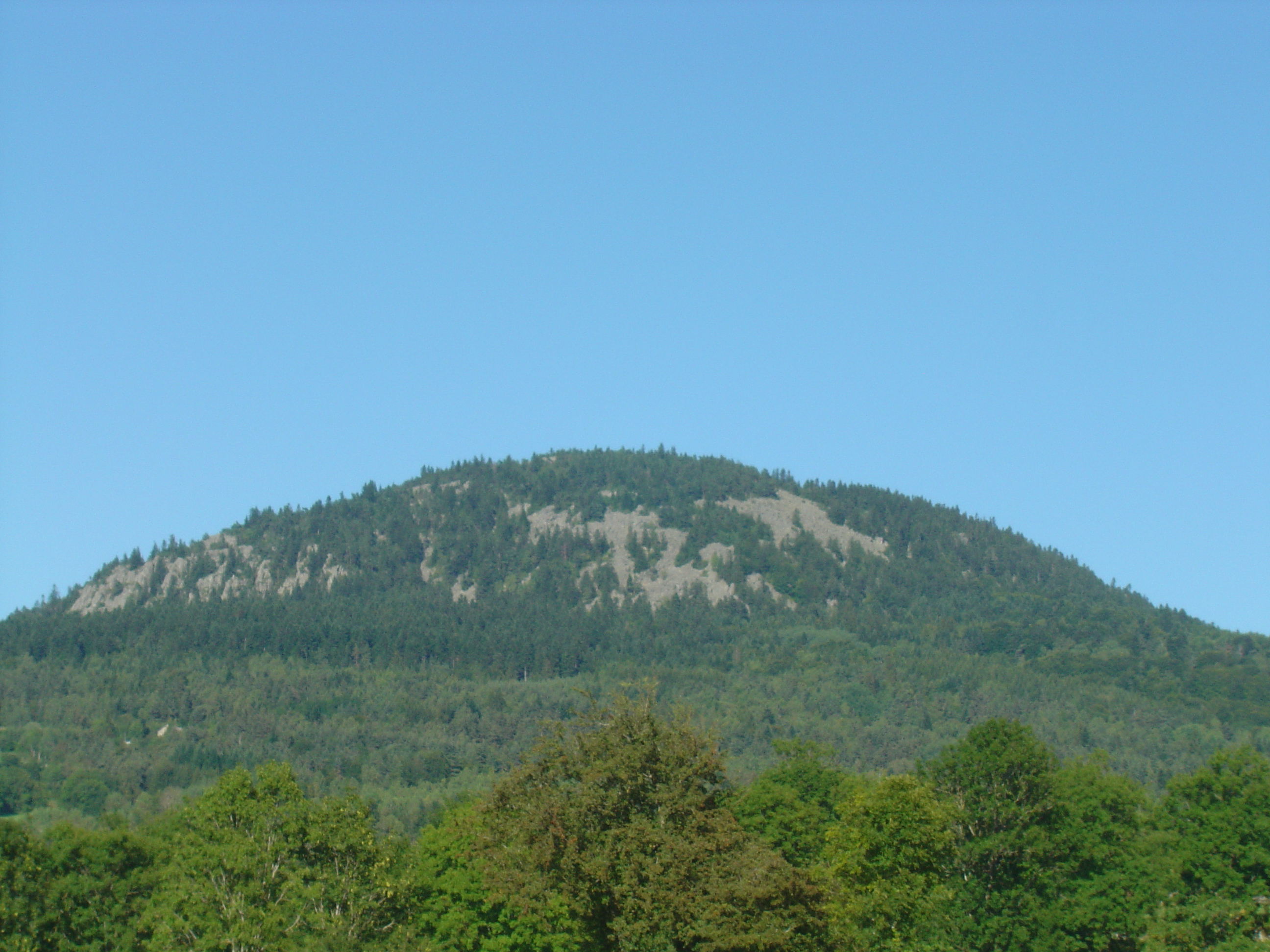
- The Grand Testavoyre.

Highest point
- Elevation: 1,436 m (4,711 ft)
- Coordinates: 45°03′17″N 4°07′49″E

Geography
- Location within France
- Location: Haute-Loire departement, France
- Parent range: Meygal (Massif Central)

Testavoira, also known as Testavoyre, is the highest point in the Meygal massif, reaching 1,436 meters above sea level in the Velay region of France.

== Geography ==
=== Location ===
The mountain is situated between the municipalities of Queyrières and Champclause in the department of Haute-Loire.

=== Geology ===
The bedrock of Testavoyre is composed of phonolite.

== Sports ==
The mountain can be reached by following a marked hiking trail, and it is also crossed by a trail itinerary.
