= Araules =

- Commune
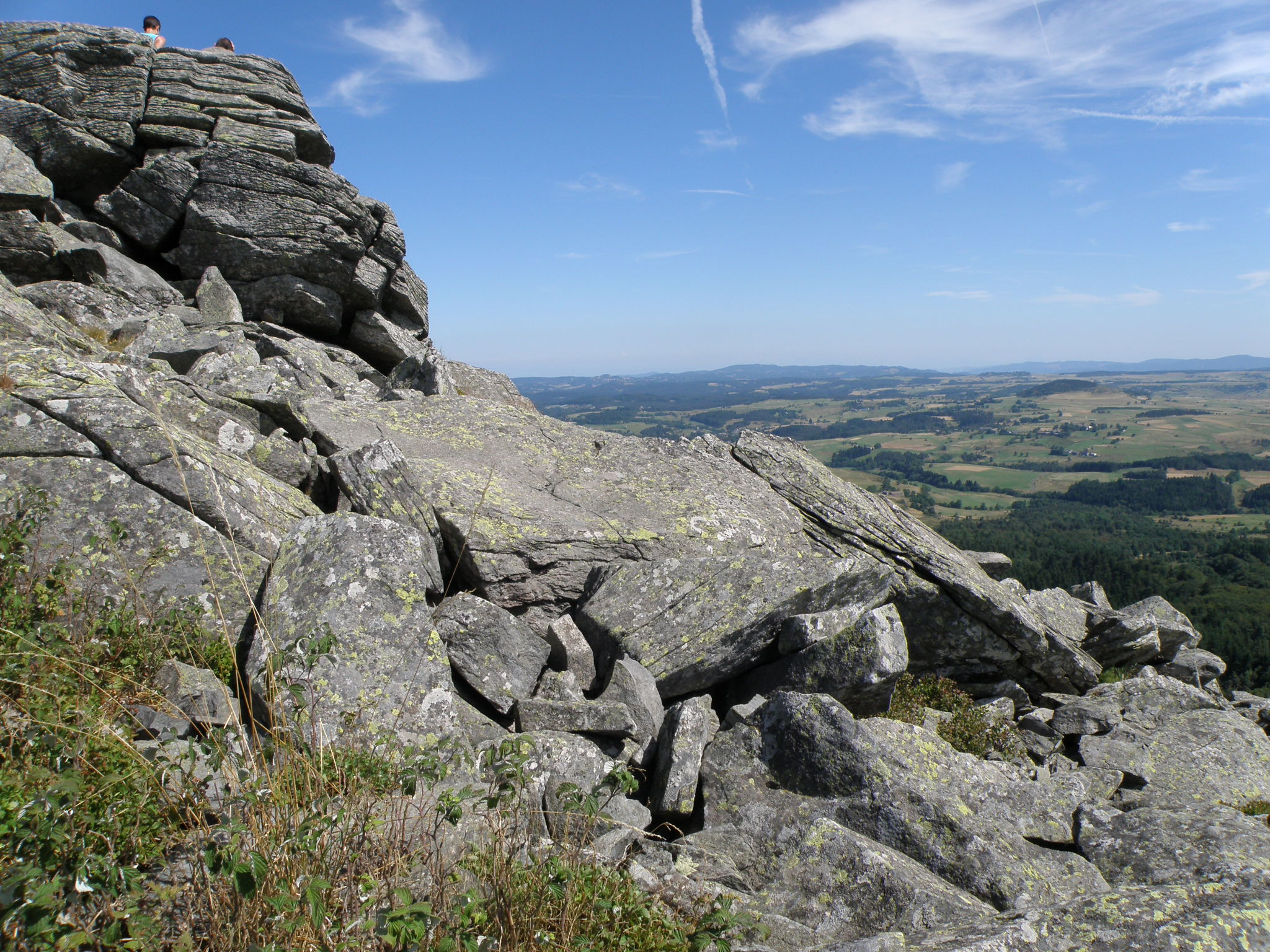
- Pic du Lizieux
- Location of Araules
- Location within France Location within Auvergne-Rhône-Alpes
- Coordinates: 45°05′28″N 4°10′26″E
- Country: France
- Region: Auvergne-Rhône-Alpes
- Department: Haute-Loire
- Arrondissement: Yssingeaux
- Canton: Yssingeaux

Government
  - Mayor (2021–2026): Nadine Dufour
- Area^{1}: 31.1 km^{2} (12.0 sq mi)
- Elevation: 1,044 m (3,425 ft)
- Highest elevation: 1,386 m (4,547 ft)
- Lowest elevation: 920 m (3,020 ft)
- Population (2023): 620
  - Density: 20/km^{2} (52/sq mi)
- Time zone: UTC+01:00 (CET)
  - Summer (DST): UTC+02:00 (CEST)
- INSEE/Postal code: 43007 /43200
- ^{1} French Land Register data, which excludes lakes, ponds, glaciers > 1 km^{2} (0.386 sq mi or 247 acres) and river estuaries.

Araules (French pronunciation: [aʁol]; Occitan: Araulas) is a commune in the Haute-Loire department in south-central France.

== Population ==
Historical population
Year	Pop.	±% p.a.
1968	865	—
1975	777	−1.52%
1982	686	−1.76%
1990	595	−1.76%
1999	607	+0.22%
2007	617	+0.20%
2012	610	−0.23%
2017	597	−0.43%
2023	620	+0.63%
Source: INSEE

== See also ==
- Communes of the Haute-Loire department
