= Perdrix River =

Perdrix River may refer to:

- Perdrix River (Bécancour River tributary), Quebec, Canada
- Perdrix River (Eeyou Istchee Baie-James), a tributary of the Wawagosic River in Quebec, Canada
- Rivière des Perdrix (Bras Saint-Nicolas), Montmagny Regional County Municipality, Chaudière-Appalaches, Quebec, Canada

== See also ==
- Perdrix (disambiguation)
