= Puy Pariou =

Volcano in France

Coordinates: 45.7955°N 2.9703°E

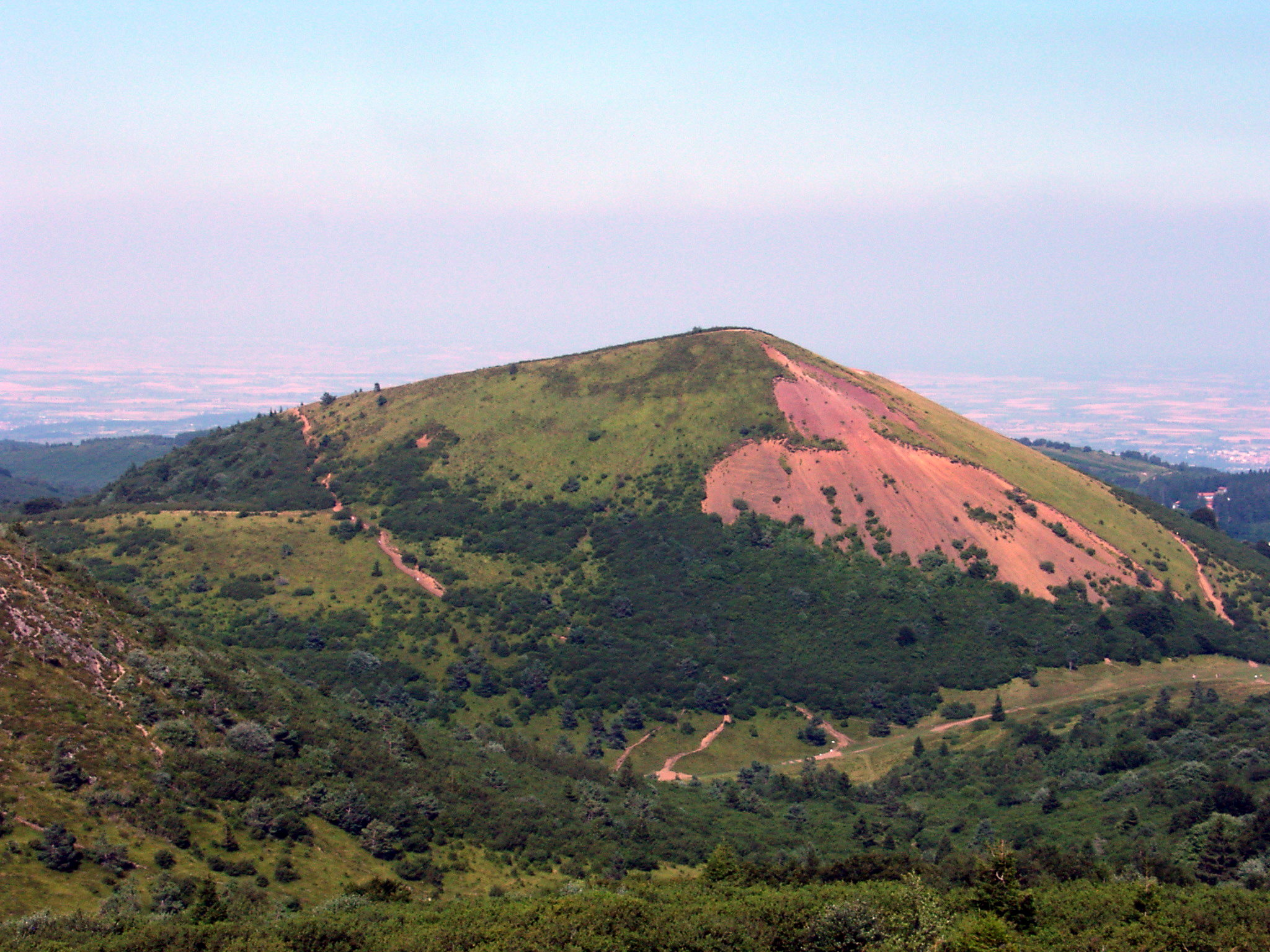
General view of the puy de Pariou from the south-west

The Puy de Pariou, also known as Puy Pariou or Le Pariou, is a volcano located in the Chaîne des Puys, in the Massif Central region. It is formed by the overlay of two strombolian cones and a tuff ring; it produced three lava flows during its eruptive history.

== Geography ==
The Puy de Pariou is located about 10 km at the west of Clermont-Ferrand and a little more than 2 km from Orcines, at the south of the road that crosses the Col des Goules. The Puy des Goules is less than 400 meters north; the Cliersou, the Grand Suchet and the Petit Suchet are situated a few hundred meters west and south-west, and the Puy de Dôme lies about 1.5 km south.

=== Topography ===
Its highest point reaches 1,209 meters, 250 meters above the crystalline basement that forms the surrounding plain. It has a typical volcano shape of strombolian type, and its crater is formed by two craters, one nested in the other. The central crater, which is the highest and most recent, has an almost perfect circle shape. It descends 90 meters and a 200 meter diameter. The two craters are not on the same axis, contrary to those Puy de Côme. The Puy de Pariou is often compared to Mount Vesuvius, because of its recent cone topping a somma.

The ancient crater, “old Pariou” and its prolongation by the tuff ring are still visible from the west and the north. It is hidden under the new crater, “new Pariou” at the south and under old lava flows at the east. The Puy de Pariou grounds are not fertile: they are punctuated by deciduous trees, junipers and a very short and thin grass.

== Geology ==
Old Pariou is trachytic and trachybasaltic. These are black rocks and contain small augite, anorthite (bytownite and labradorite types) and olivine phenocrysts.

This first cone is lengthened to the north by the trachyandesite tuff ring which caused its obstruction. These projections are dark and are composed of small andesine and hornblende crystals disseminated in a light brown volcanic glass. New Pariou is trachyandesitic. This rock is grey-bluish and contains anorthite (labradorite kind) and hornblendes trapped in volcanic glass comprising feldspar, pyroxene and olivine microlithes. The lava was very rich in gas, as showed by numerous bubbles elongated in the same direction as the flow.

=== History ===
The history of the Pariou started with the rising of the old Pariou, a strombolian cone where big explosions ejected trachytic products mixed to crystalline basement rubble. The magmatism became trachybasaltic and formed a lava flow in the south-west of the volcano. This flow spread over almost 2 km and reached the current location of Orcines.

After that, a more explosive episode began, during which the old Pariou was almost completely hidden by a trachyandesitic tuff ring. Only a small part of the ancient strombolian cone remains visible, in the south, with the rest covered by the tuff ring. The ashes of this eruptive episode spread over a large region, at least until Clermont-Ferrand.

A second strombolian cone appeared then, the new Pariou one, slightly acentric to the south. It covered all southern and east-southern parts of the old Pariou which remain visible and then forms a large trachyandesite flow to the east which covers the first trachybasalt flow. In Orcines, this second flow divides into two branches: one reaches the current location of Nohanent and the other one joins the Chamalières area, located at 8 km. This flow is estimated at 8580 years (± 350 years) thanks to radiocarbon dated wooden pieces.

A lava lake formed temporarily between the bottom of the new Pariou and the borders of the tuff ring. It created a 200-meter hole in the east-northern border of the tuff ring, and then emptied, creating a small trachyandesitic lava flow. This flow is blocked in the North by the Puy des Goules, turns east and finally stopped at the current place called “Fontaine du Berger”.
