= Meygal =

French mountain region

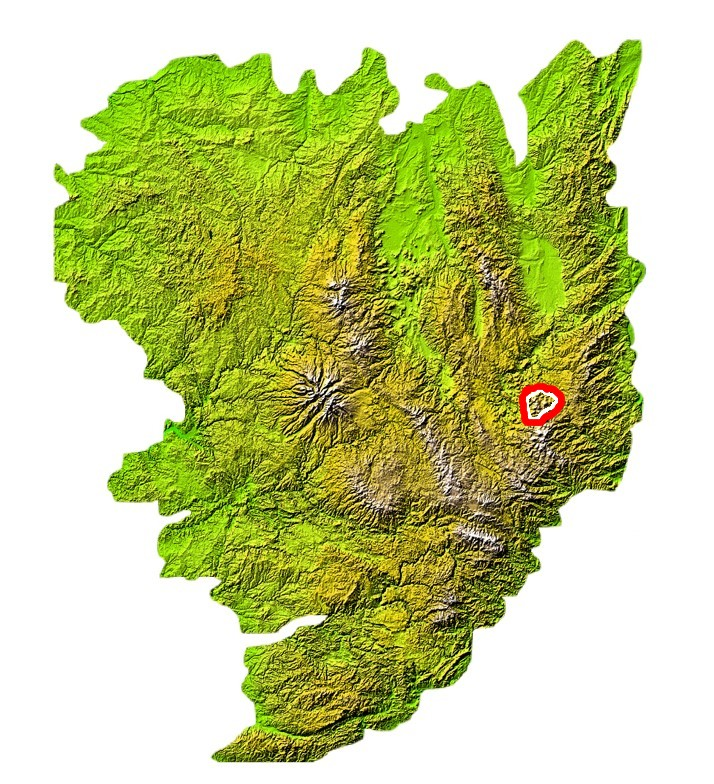
- Location map of Meygal in the Massif Central.

Highest point
- Elevation: 1,436 m (4,711 ft) at Testavoyre
- Coordinates: 45.0547°N 4.1303°E

Geography
- Location: Auvergne-Rhône-Alpes, France
- Parent range: Massif Central

The Meygal (in occitan Maigal) is a French mountain region, in the Massif Central, Haute-Loire (Auvergne-Rhône-Alpes).

== Description ==
It forms the core of the Velay. The highest points are Testavoyre (1436 m, 4590 feet) and Pic du Lizieux (1386 m, 4547 feet). The Meygal is a series of jagged peaks covered by lava flow almost 500 feet thick and 37 miles long. The river Loire traverses the region, and its flow has created gorges more than 1600 feet deep.

== See also ==
- Velay mountains
