= Mont Mézenc =

Summit of the Massif Central, France

Coordinates: 44.9111°N 4.1950°E

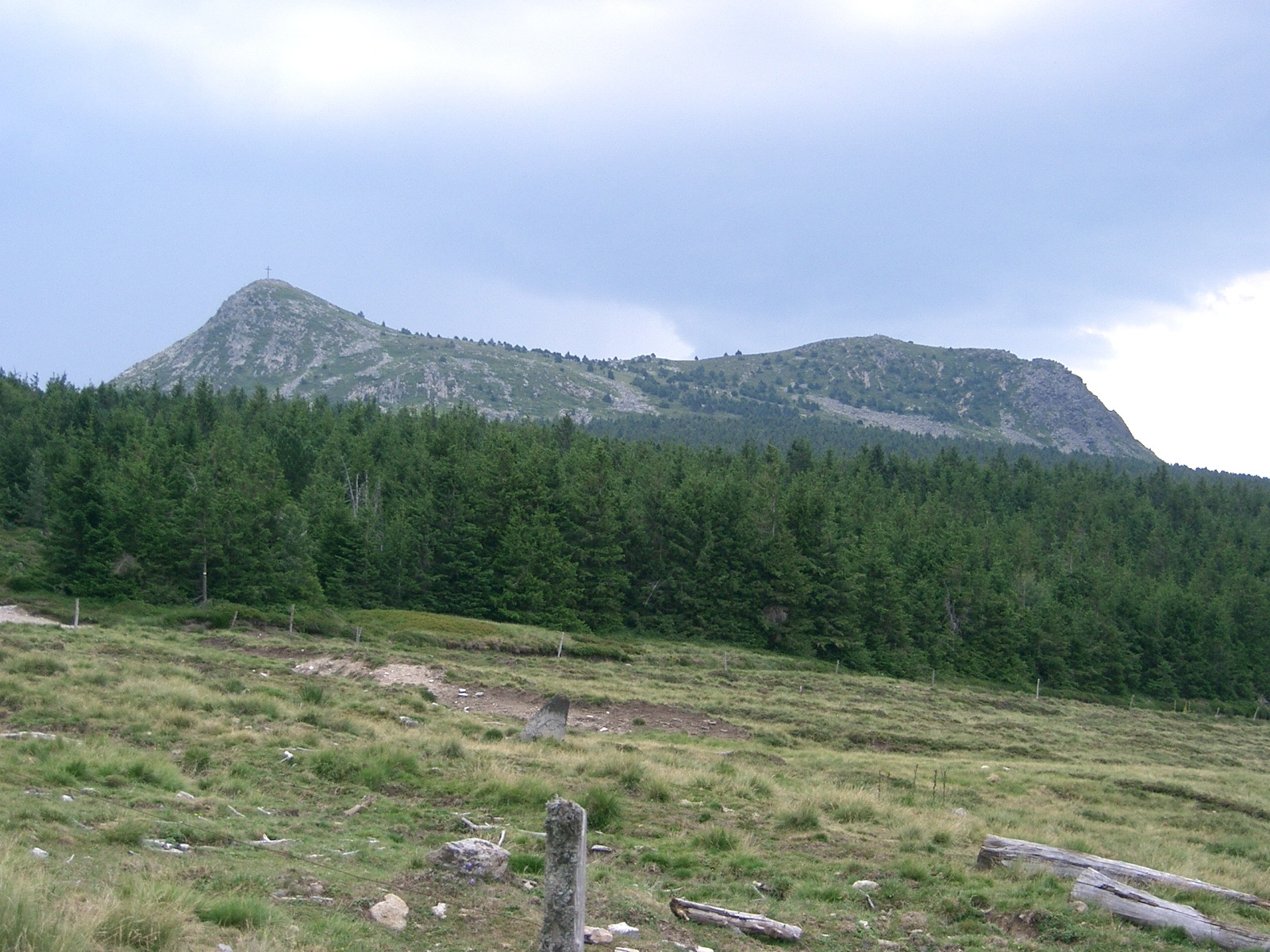

The Mont Mézenc (French pronunciation: [mezɛ̃]) is a summit of the Massif Central, France.

== Description ==
Located at the altitude of 1753 m (5751 feet) - for the South Summit, and 1744 m (5722 feet) for the North Summit - in the department of Haute-Loire, Auvergne-Rhône-Alpes, France, it's the highest point of the department (and of the department of Ardèche). The Mont Mézenc has a volcanic origin. It's a dome of phonolite dating seven million years.

== Climate ==
Mont Mézenc has a humid continental climate (Köppen Dfb), bordering on a subarctic climate (Köppen Dfc). Estables.sa is a weather station situated on the southern face of Mont d'Alambre, 1,691 metres (5,548 ft), approximately 1.5 kilometres (0.93 mi) from the North Summit of Mont Mézenc.

Climate data for Mont Mézenc (Estables.sa), 1486m (1981−2010 normals, 1982−2010 extremes)
Month	Jan	Feb	Mar	Apr	May	Jun	Jul	Aug	Sep	Oct	Nov	Dec	Year
Record high °C (°F)	18.0 (64.4)	16.6 (61.9)	19.6 (67.3)	20.3 (68.5)	24.1 (75.4)	31.0 (87.8)	31.6 (88.9)	31.4 (88.5)	29.5 (85.1)	22.9 (73.2)	18.3 (64.9)	17.4 (63.3)	31.6 (88.9)
Mean daily maximum °C (°F)	1.6 (34.9)	1.7 (35.1)	4.6 (40.3)	7.4 (45.3)	12.3 (54.1)	16.4 (61.5)	19.8 (67.6)	19.5 (67.1)	15.1 (59.2)	10.8 (51.4)	4.9 (40.8)	2.5 (36.5)	9.7 (49.5)
Daily mean °C (°F)	−1.2 (29.8)	−1.1 (30.0)	1.3 (34.3)	3.7 (38.7)	8.3 (46.9)	11.9 (53.4)	14.9 (58.8)	14.8 (58.6)	11.0 (51.8)	7.4 (45.3)	2.1 (35.8)	−0.2 (31.6)	6.1 (42.9)
Mean daily minimum °C (°F)	−3.9 (25.0)	−4.0 (24.8)	−2.1 (28.2)	−0.1 (31.8)	4.2 (39.6)	7.5 (45.5)	10.0 (50.0)	10.2 (50.4)	6.9 (44.4)	4.0 (39.2)	−0.7 (30.7)	−2.9 (26.8)	2.4 (36.4)
Record low °C (°F)	−25.5 (−13.9)	−22.8 (−9.0)	−17.3 (0.9)	−10.5 (13.1)	−5.5 (22.1)	−1.6 (29.1)	0.8 (33.4)	0.0 (32.0)	−2.0 (28.4)	−9.8 (14.4)	−16.0 (3.2)	−18.2 (−0.8)	−25.5 (−13.9)
Average precipitation mm (inches)	81.9 (3.22)	72.9 (2.87)	62.2 (2.45)	117.1 (4.61)	135.7 (5.34)	92.8 (3.65)	67.2 (2.65)	88.8 (3.50)	124.0 (4.88)	138.5 (5.45)	133.8 (5.27)	83.1 (3.27)	1,198 (47.16)
Source: Meteociel

== See also ==
- Mountains of Mezenc
