= Crêt de la Perdrix =

Mountain in central France

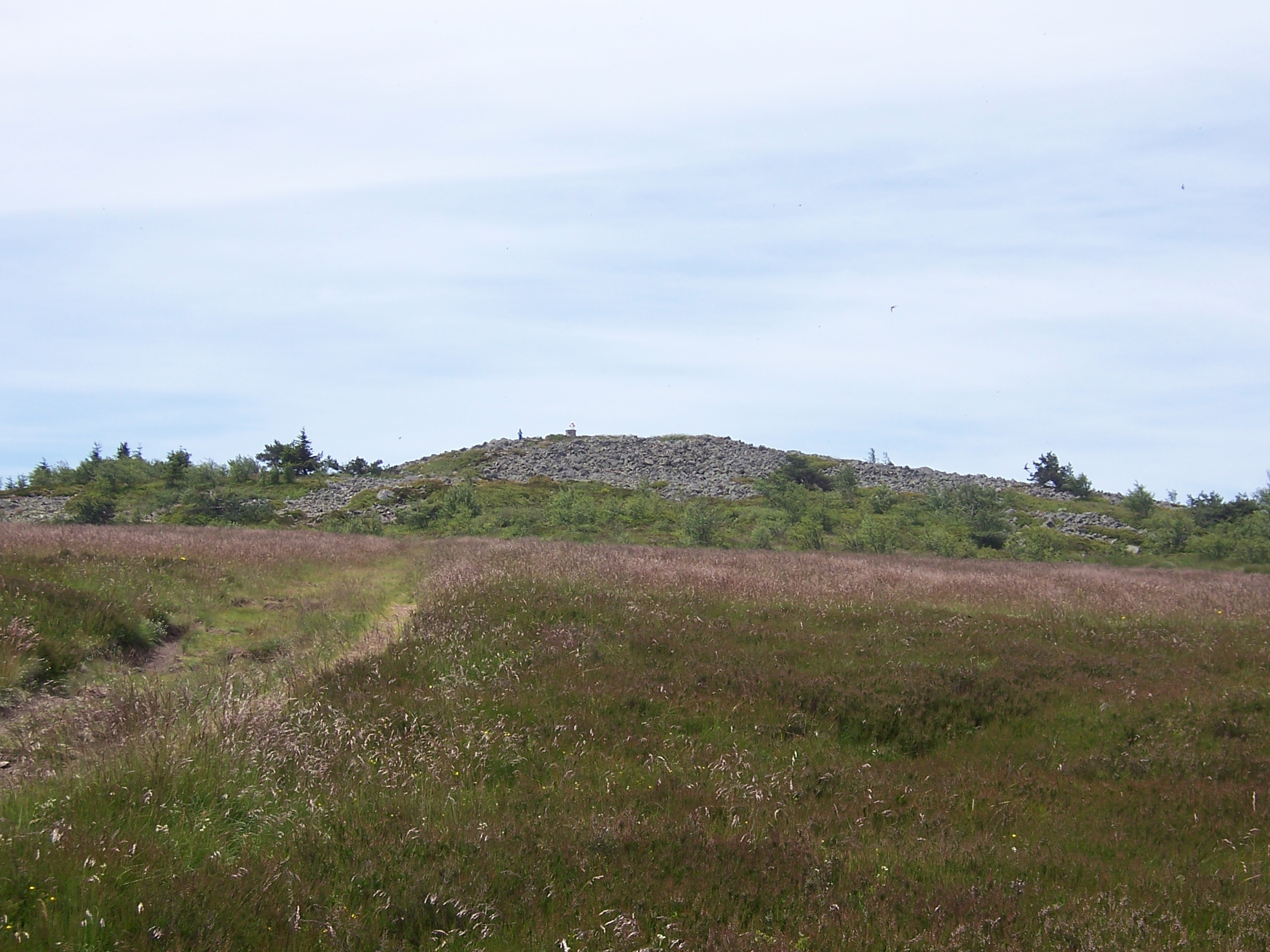

Highest point
- Elevation: 1,432 m (4,698 ft)
- Coordinates: 44°22′57″N 4°34′22″E

Geography
- Location within France
- Location: Loire departement, France
- Parent range: Mont Pilat (Massif Central)

Geology
- Rock type: Gneiss

The Crêt de la Perdrix, also known as the Crest de la Perdrix, is a peak with an elevation of 1,432 m located in the Loire department, about 10 km as the crow flies from Saint-Étienne. It is the highest point of the Pilat massif, a mountain range situated on the eastern foothills of the Massif Central.

== Geography ==
An orientation table has been installed there, offering a 360° view over seven departments. To the east, a panorama opens onto the Alps and the Rhône Valley; to the north, onto Saint-Étienne, the Forez plain and mountains; and to the west, onto the mountain ranges of Haute-Loire. Below the Crêt de la Perdrix lies La Jasserie, a meadow shaped like an amphitheatre, where the source of the Gier is located, along with a hamlet and a stone building topped with a small bell tower, next to which remain the remnants of a ski jump and one of the first ski lifts in France.

== History ==
During a medical evacuation flight between Luxeuil and Istres on 1 November 1944, the five crew members of an American Douglas C-47 Skytrain and 15 wounded Allied and German soldiers died in a crash between the Crêt de la Perdrix and the Crêt de Botte. Two memorial stones commemorate this accident: one near La Jasserie and the other on a trail between La Jasserie and the Col de la Botte.
