= Mont Gerbier de Jonc =

Mountain in central France

Gerbier de Jonc
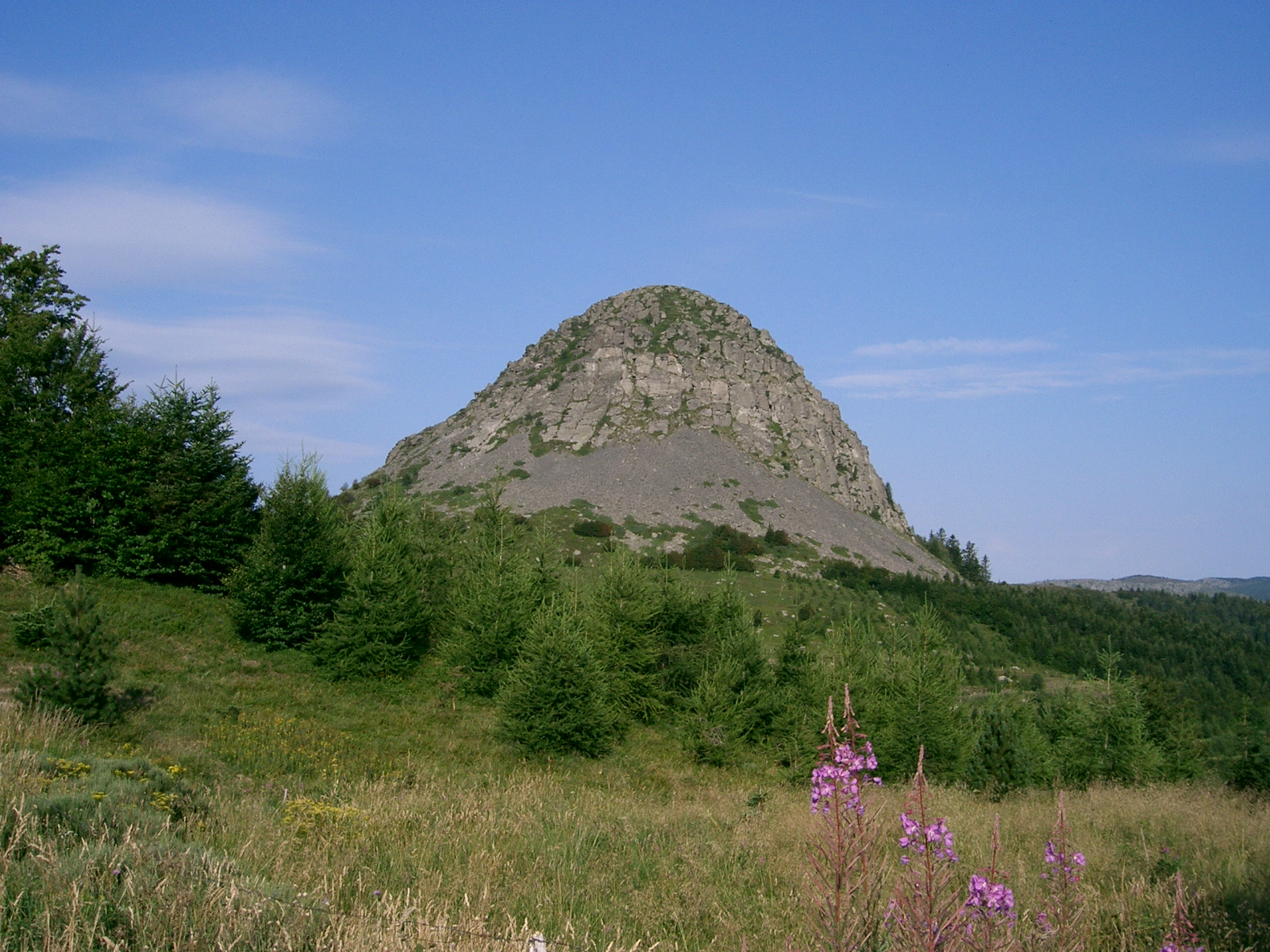

Highest point
- Elevation: 1,551 m (5,089 ft)
- Coordinates: 44°50′40″N 4°13′12″E

Geography
- Location within France
- Location: Ardèche, France
- Parent range: Massif Central

Geology
- Mountain type(s): Lava dome Phonolite

Mont Gerbier de Jonc is a mountain of volcanic origin located in the Massif Central in France. It is made of a type of rock called phonolite. It rises to an altitude of 1,551 m (5,089 ft), and its base contains three springs that are the source of the Loire, France's longest river. It is the second most-visited site in the département of Ardèche, after the Ardèche Gorges.

Mont Gerbier de Jonc was formed 8 million years ago when a volcano erupted molten phonolite lava. The lava was too viscous to flow far and it cooled to form a lava dome of phonolite rock in the crater of the volcano. The lava dome has columnar jointing, which formed during cooling of the lava. The volcanic cone containing the lava dome was later eroded away, exposing the lava dome.
