= Les Estables =

- Commune
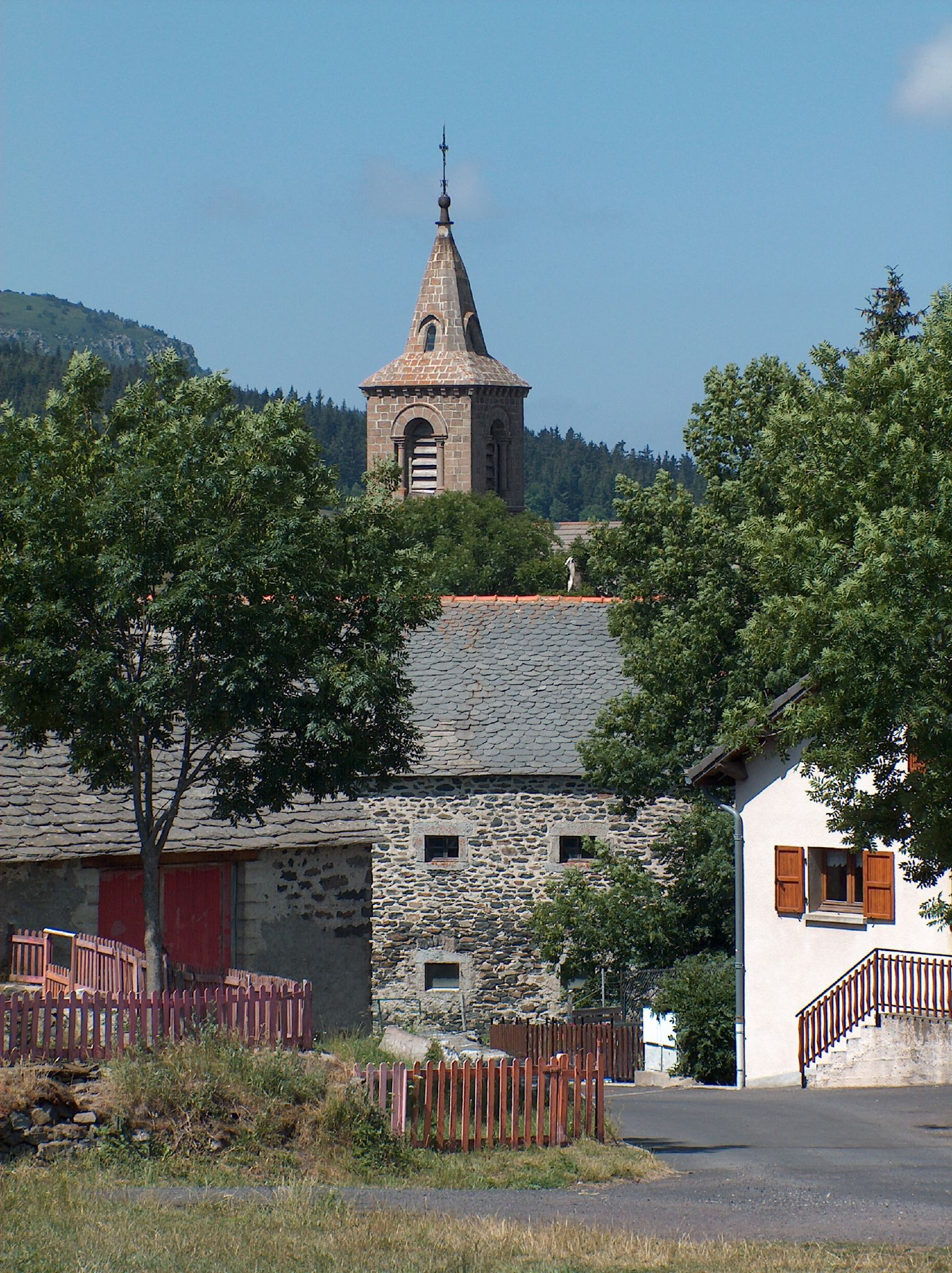
- Location of Les Estables
- Location within France Location within Auvergne-Rhône-Alpes
- Coordinates: 44°54′19″N 4°09′18″E
- Country: France
- Region: Auvergne-Rhône-Alpes
- Department: Haute-Loire
- Arrondissement: Le Puy-en-Velay
- Canton: Mézenc

Government
  - Mayor (2020–2026): Philippe Brun
- Area^{1}: 33.94 km^{2} (13.10 sq mi)
- Elevation: 1,346 m (4,416 ft)
- Highest elevation: 1,725 m (5,659 ft)
- Lowest elevation: 1,033 m (3,389 ft)
- Population (2023): 321
  - Density: 9.46/km^{2} (24.5/sq mi)
- Time zone: UTC+01:00 (CET)
  - Summer (DST): UTC+02:00 (CEST)
- INSEE/Postal code: 43091 /43150
- ^{1} French Land Register data, which excludes lakes, ponds, glaciers > 1 km^{2} (0.386 sq mi or 247 acres) and river estuaries.

Les Estables (French pronunciation: [le.z‿ɛstabl]; Occitan: Los Estables) is a commune in the Haute-Loire department in south-central France. The area is known for its ski resorts and outdoor activities.

== History ==
A young geometer, who was doing survey work in the area for the Cassini maps, the first modern maps of France, was hacked to death by suspicious villagers in the 1740s.

== Population ==
Historical population
Year	Pop.	±% p.a.
1968	526	—
1975	480	−1.30%
1982	350	−4.41%
1990	312	−1.43%
1999	325	+0.45%
2007	372	+1.70%
2012	341	−1.73%
2017	333	−0.47%
2023	321	−0.61%
Source: INSEE

== Climate ==
Climate data for Les Estables, 1350m (1991−2020 normals, 2009−2024 extremes)
Month	Jan	Feb	Mar	Apr	May	Jun	Jul	Aug	Sep	Oct	Nov	Dec	Year
Record high °C (°F)	17.4 (63.3)	16.1 (61.0)	18.9 (66.0)	21.4 (70.5)	26.3 (79.3)	31.9 (89.4)	29.7 (85.5)	33.0 (91.4)	26.3 (79.3)	25.8 (78.4)	18.8 (65.8)	16.7 (62.1)	33.0 (91.4)
Mean daily maximum °C (°F)	1.9 (35.4)	1.8 (35.2)	6.0 (42.8)	10.0 (50.0)	12.7 (54.9)	17.8 (64.0)	20.9 (69.6)	20.8 (69.4)	16.6 (61.9)	11.7 (53.1)	6.4 (43.5)	3.7 (38.7)	10.9 (51.5)
Daily mean °C (°F)	−0.9 (30.4)	−1.3 (29.7)	2.4 (36.3)	5.8 (42.4)	8.4 (47.1)	13.0 (55.4)	15.6 (60.1)	15.4 (59.7)	11.8 (53.2)	8.0 (46.4)	3.5 (38.3)	0.7 (33.3)	6.9 (44.4)
Mean daily minimum °C (°F)	−3.7 (25.3)	−4.3 (24.3)	−1.2 (29.8)	1.6 (34.9)	4.1 (39.4)	8.1 (46.6)	10.3 (50.5)	10.1 (50.2)	7.0 (44.6)	4.2 (39.6)	0.6 (33.1)	−2.2 (28.0)	2.9 (37.2)
Record low °C (°F)	−16.9 (1.6)	−19.2 (−2.6)	−14.4 (6.1)	−8.6 (16.5)	−4.7 (23.5)	−0.2 (31.6)	3.5 (38.3)	3.2 (37.8)	−0.7 (30.7)	−7.9 (17.8)	−12.2 (10.0)	−15.0 (5.0)	−19.2 (−2.6)
Average precipitation mm (inches)	83.9 (3.30)	65.5 (2.58)	91.0 (3.58)	99.9 (3.93)	122.6 (4.83)	109.5 (4.31)	93.7 (3.69)	60.5 (2.38)	86.8 (3.42)	154.4 (6.08)	181.0 (7.13)	77.9 (3.07)	1,226.7 (48.3)
Source: Météo-France

== See also ==
- Communes of the Haute-Loire department
