= Massif Central =

Highland region in southern France

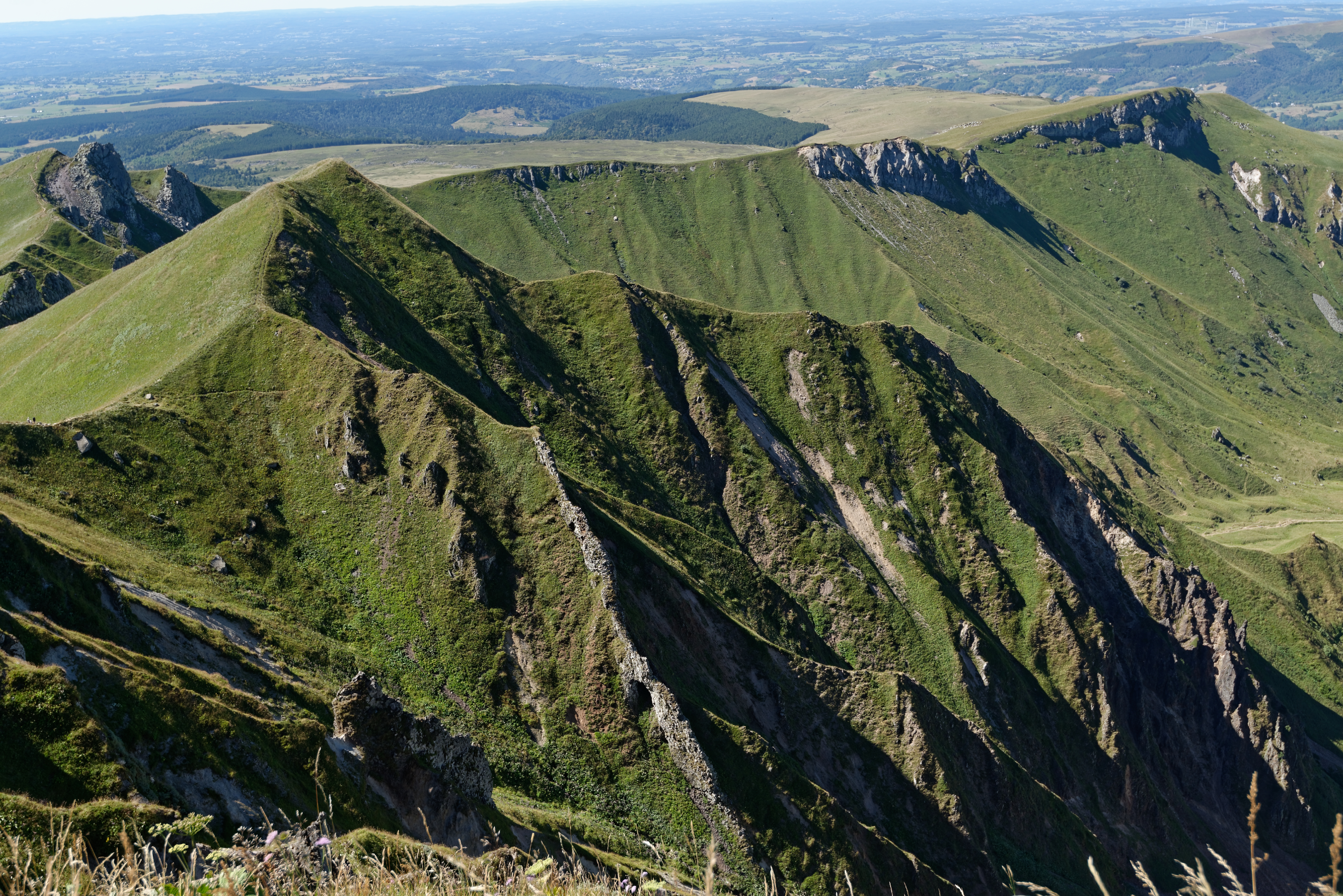
- View of Puy de Sancy, the highest peak in the Massif Central

Highest point
- Peak: Puy de Sancy
- Elevation: 1,886 m (6,188 ft)
- Coordinates: 45°31′42″N 2°48′51″E

Naming
- Native name: Massís Central (Occitan)
- Pronunciation: UK: /ˌmæsiːf sɒ̃ˈtrɑːl/, US: /mæˌsiːf -, - sɛnˈ-, məˌsiːf sɑːnˈ-/ French: [masif sɑ̃tʁal] Occitan: [maˈsis senˈtɾal]

Geography
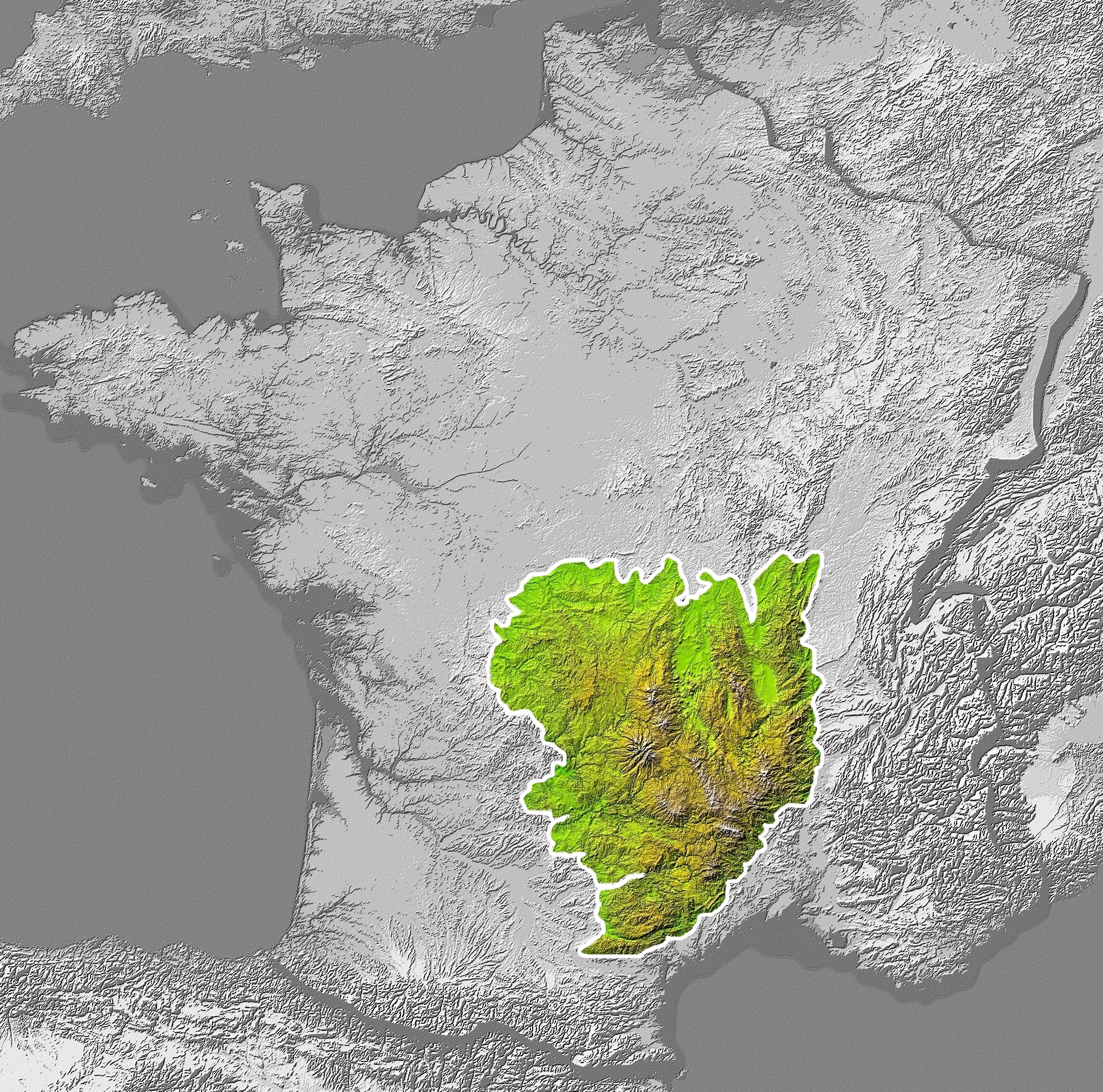
- Country: France
- Regions: Auvergne-Rhône-Alpes; Bourgogne-Franche-Comté; Nouvelle-Aquitaine; Occitania
- Range coordinates: 46°N 3°E

The Massif Central (French pronunciation: [masif sɑ̃tʁal]) is a highland region in south-central France consisting of mountains and plateaus. It covers about 15% of mainland France.

Subject to volcanism that has subsided in the last 10,000 years, these central mountains are separated from the Alps by a deep north–south cleft created by the Rhône river and known in French as the sillon rhodanien (literally "Rhône furrow"). The region was a barrier to transport within France until the opening of the A75 motorway, which not only made north–south travel easier but also opened access to the massif itself.

== Geography and geology ==
The Massif Central is an old massif, formed during the Variscan orogeny, consisting mostly of granitic and metamorphic rocks. It was powerfully raised and made to look geologically younger in the eastern section by the uplift of the Alps during the Paleogene period and in the southern section by the uplift of the Pyrenees. The massif thus presents a strongly asymmetrical elevation profile with highlands in the south and in the east (Cévennes) dominating the valley of the Rhône and the plains of Languedoc and, by contrast, the less elevated region of Limousin in the northwest.

These tectonic movements created faults and may be at the origin of the volcanism in the massif (but the hypothesis is not yet proven). In fact, above the crystalline foundation, one can observe many volcanoes of many different types and ages: volcanic plateaus (Aubrac, Cézallier), stratovolcanoes (Mounts of Cantal, Monts Dore), and small, very recent monogenic volcanoes (Chaîne des Puys, Vivarais). The entire region contains a large concentration of around 450 extinct volcanoes. The Chaîne des Puys (near Clermont-Ferrand), a range running north to south and less than 160 km^{2} (60 sq mi) long, contains 115 of them (monogenic volcanoes only). The Auvergne Volcanoes regional natural park is in the massif. The amusement park of Vulcania near Clermont-Ferrand allows visitors to discover this natural heritage and introduces them to volcanology.

In the south, one remarkable region is made up of features called Causses in French and consists of raised limestone plateaus cut by very deep canyons. The most famous of them is the Gorges du Tarn (Tarn Canyon).

== Mountains ==
Mountain ranges, with notable individual mountains, are (roughly north to south):

- Chaîne des Puys
  - Puy de Dôme (1,464 m; 4,803 ft)
  - Puy de Pariou (1,210 m; 3,970 ft)
  - Puy de Lassolas (1,187 m; 3,894 ft)
  - Puy de la Vache (1,167 m; 3,829 ft)
- Monts Dore
  - Puy de Sancy (1,886 m; 6,188 ft)
- Monts du Lyonnais
- Pilat massif
  - Crêt de la Perdrix (1,431 m; 4,695 ft)
- Mounts of Cantal
  - Plomb du Cantal (1,855 m; 6,086 ft)
  - Puy Mary (1,787 m; 5,863 ft)
- Forez mountains
  - Pierre-sur-Haute (1,631 m; 5,351 ft)
- Aubrac
  - Signal de Mailhebiau (1,469 m; 4,820 ft)
- Margeride
  - Signal de Randon (1,551 m; 5,089 ft)
  - Mont Mouchet (1,497 m; 4,911 ft)
- Vivarais (Ardèche)
  - Mont Mézenc (1,753 m; 5,751 ft)
  - Mont Gerbier de Jonc (1,551 m; 5,089 ft)
- Cévennes
  - Mont Lozère (1,699 m; 5,574 ft), the highest non-volcanic summit
  - Mont Aigoual (1,567 m; 5,141 ft), near Le Vigan, Florac
- Monts de Lacaune
  - Montgrand (1,267 m; 4,157 ft)
- Monts de l'Espinouse
  - Sommet de l'Espinouse (1,124 m; 3,688 ft)
- Montagne Noire
  - Pic de Nore (1,211 m; 3,973 ft)
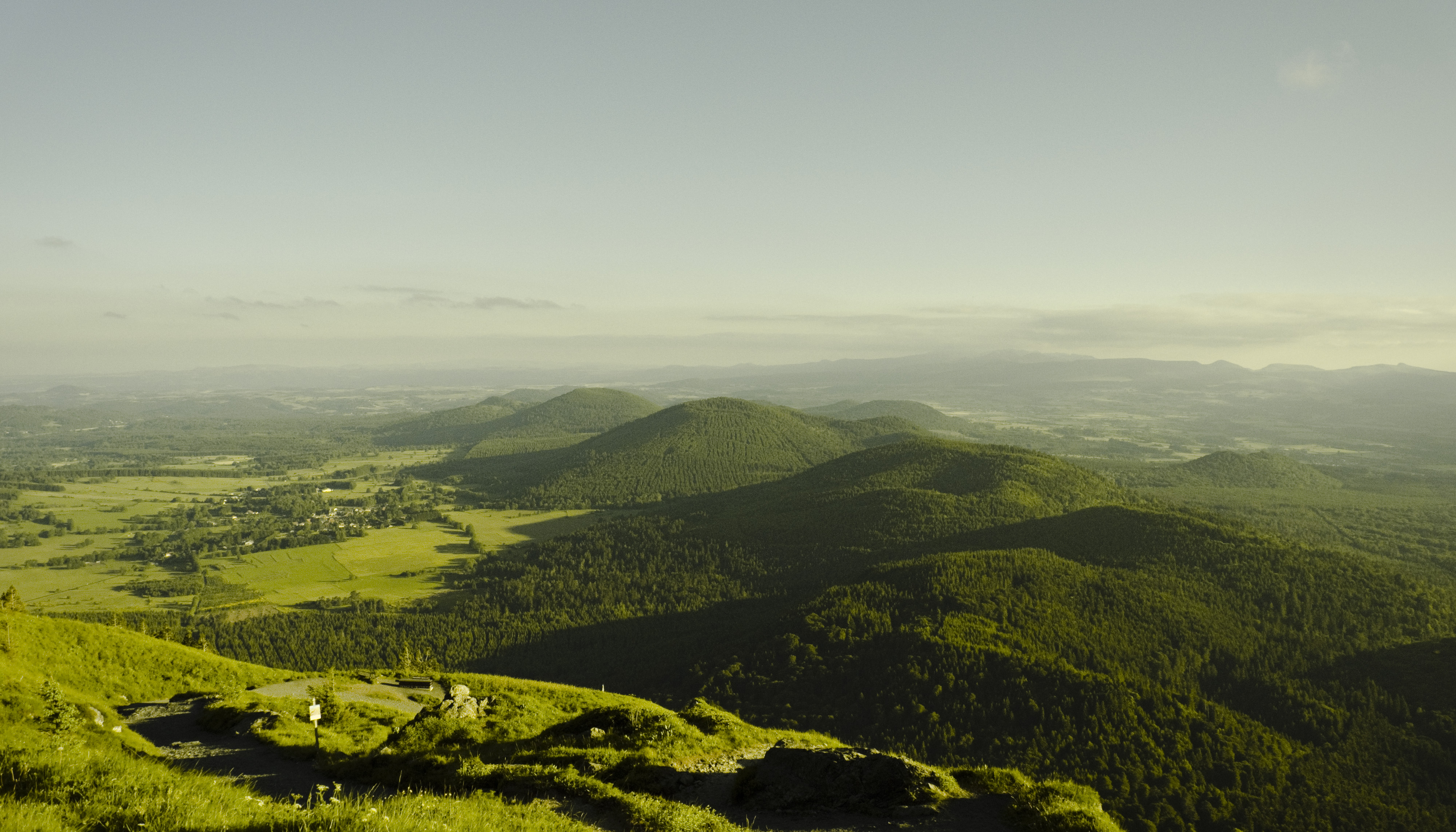
Chaine des Puys in Auvergne

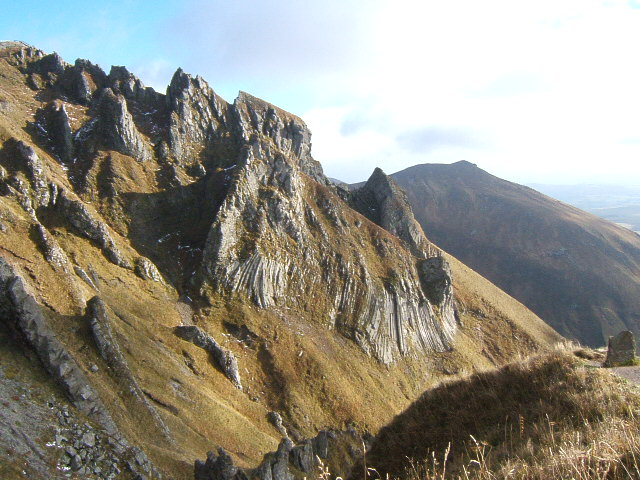
Puy de Sancy (1,886 m; 6,188 ft)

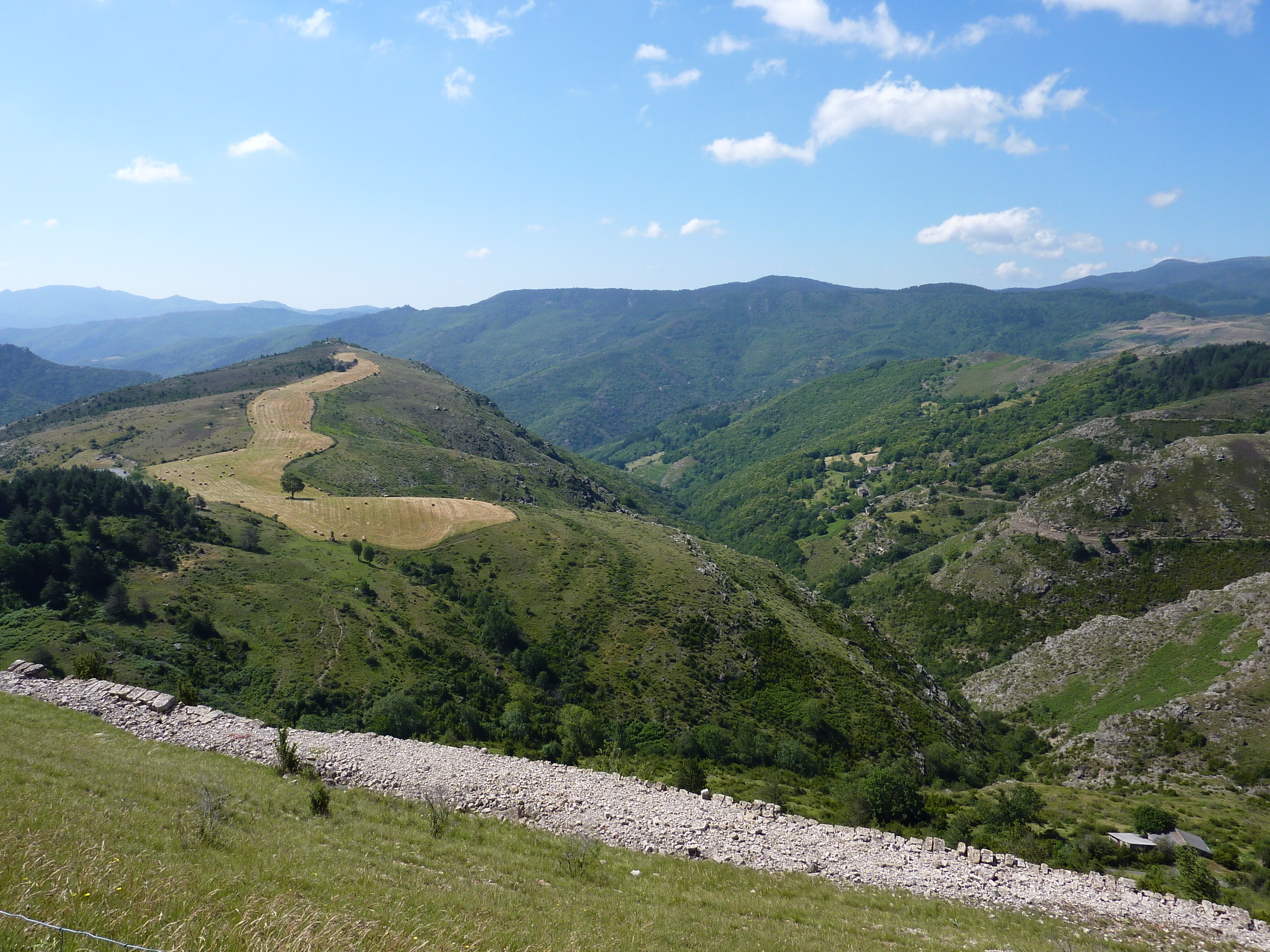
The Cévennes range

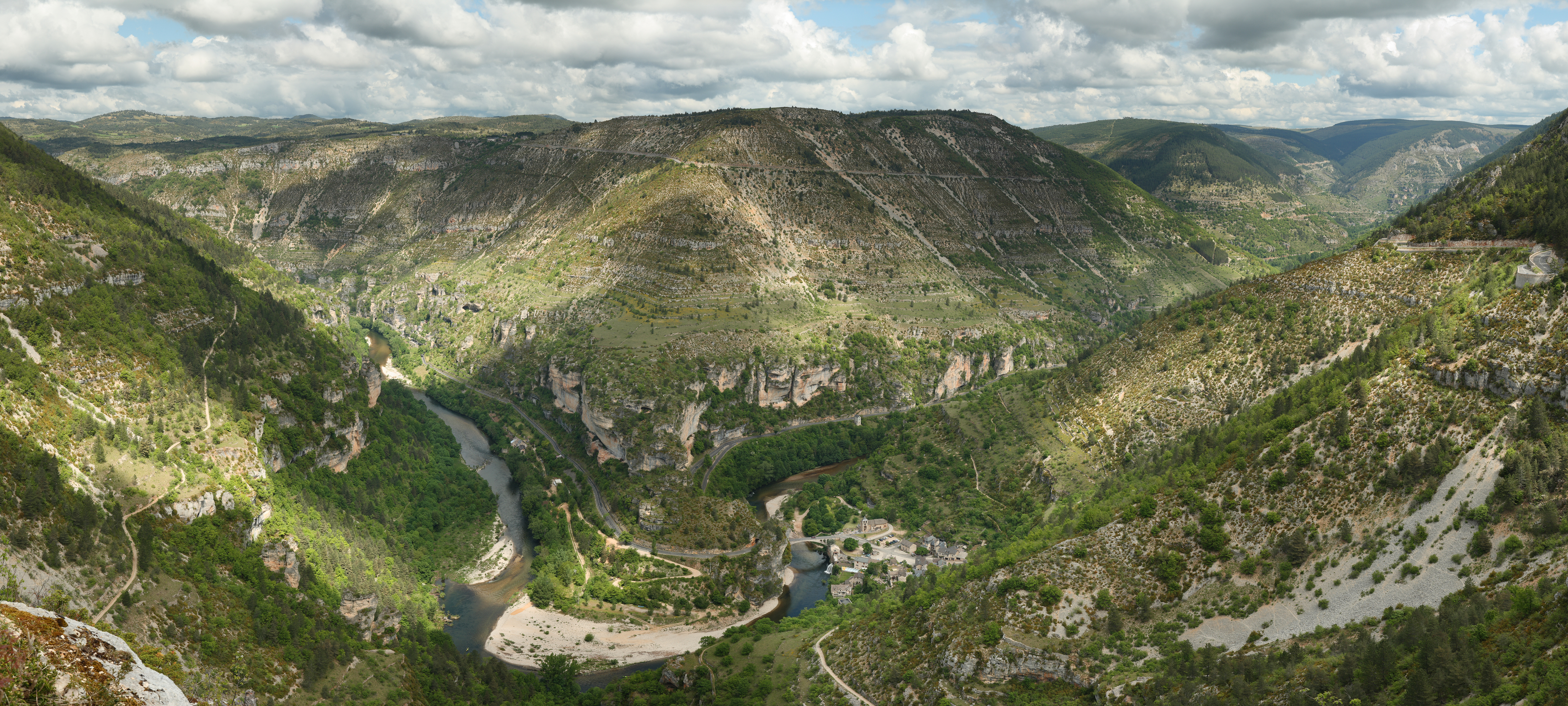
Gorges du Tarn canyon

== Plateaus ==
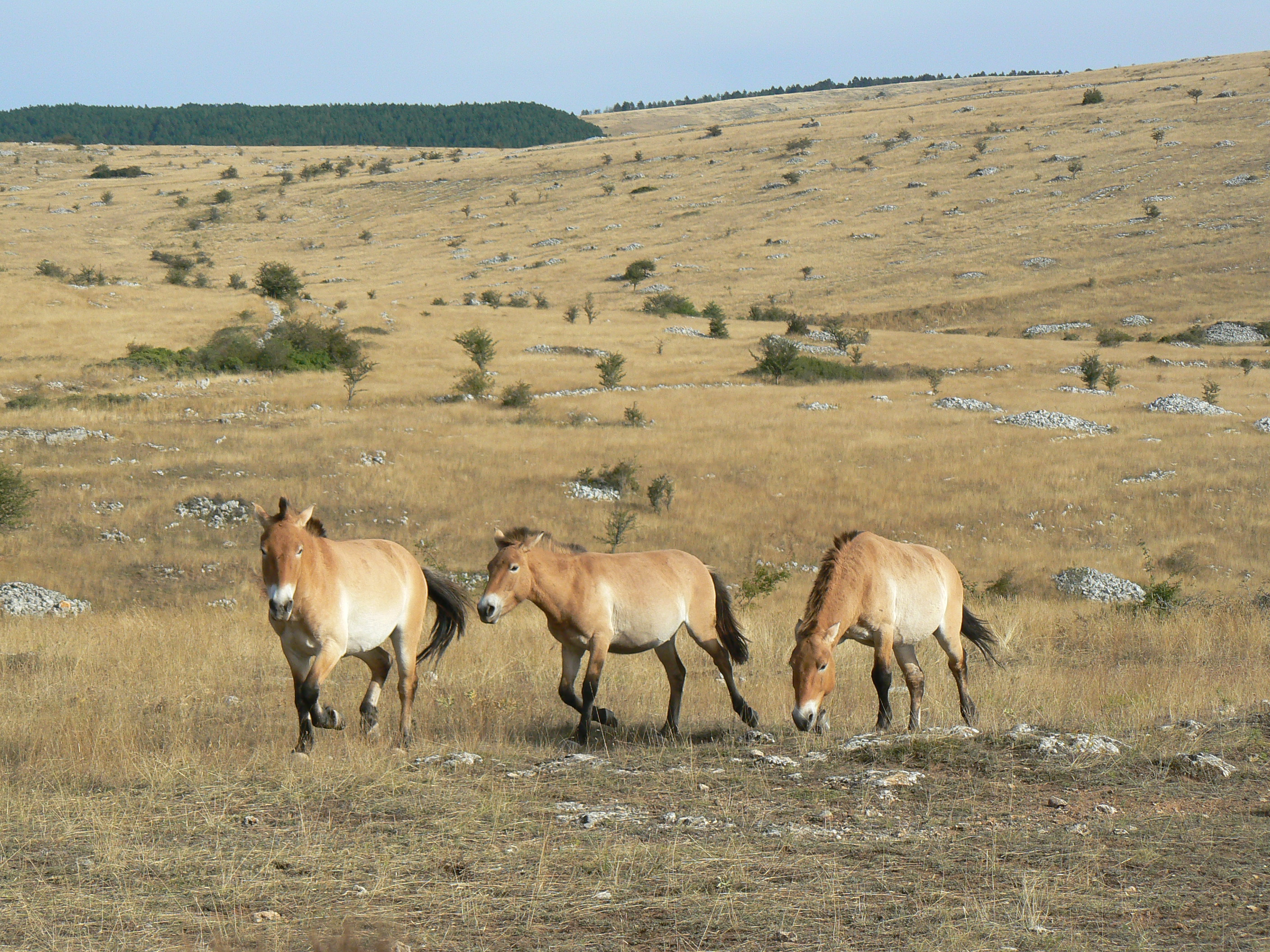
Causse Méjean

- Causse de Blandas
- Causse du Larzac
- Causse Méjean
- Causse de Sauveterre
- Causse de Sévérac
- Causse du Comtal
- Causse Noir
- Plateau de Lévézou
- Plateau de Millevaches

== Administration ==
The following departments are generally considered as part of the Massif Central: Allier, Ardèche, Aude, Aveyron, Cantal, Corrèze, Creuse, Gard, Haute-Garonne, Haute-Loire, Haute-Vienne, Hérault, Loire, Lot, Lozère, Puy-de-Dôme, Rhône, Saône-et-Loire, Tarn, and Tarn-et-Garonne; these form parts of the regions of Auvergne-Rhône-Alpes, Bourgogne-Franche-Comté, Nouvelle-Aquitaine and Occitania.

The largest cities in the region are Clermont-Ferrand, Limoges, and Saint-Étienne.

== Economy ==
The Millau Viaduct

In the Massif Central, the industry remains little developed except locally (metallurgy in Saint-Étienne; tyres in Clermont-Ferrand, headquarters of Michelin, world leader in the sector; aeronautics industry in Figeac, etc.). The other industries present are linked to agriculture (Groupe Limagrain, the world's third-largest seed producer and cheese-producing industries that export to the world such as Cantal and Roquefort).

On the agricultural level, the Limagne plain is dominated by major cereal crops, but in the mountains, it is mainly livestock farming that predominates: cattle farming in the west for meat and milk (Cantal cheese), sheep farming in the south on the limestone plateaus (Roquefort cheese).

Finally, tourism is booming, taking advantage of the UNESCO heritage classification of the volcanoes of the Chaîne des Puys and the Causses and Cévennes region.

The entire economy of the Massif Central has benefited from the opening of roads, particularly the construction of the A75 motorway on which is located the famous Millau Viaduct.

== See also ==
- Flora of the Massif Central
- Geography of France
- Mountains of Mezenc
