= Château de Virieu =

Château de Virieu may refer to:

- Château de Virieu (Isère)
- Château de Virieu (Loire)
