= Crossbow (TV series) =

Action adventure television series

- Genre: Action; Adventure
- Created by: Anthony Horowitz
- Starring: Will Lyman; Hans Meyer; Guy Rolfe; John Otway; Bernard Spiegel; Nick Brimble; Bertie Cortez; David Barry Gray; Dana Barron; Jeremy Clyde
- Composer: Stanislas Syrewicz
- Countries of origin: United States; France; United Kingdom
- No. of seasons: 3
- No. of episodes: 72

Production
- Executive producers: Mark Grenside; Simon Oakes
- Running time: 25–27 minutes

Original release
- Network: CBN Cable Network
- Release: August 30, 1987 – February 11, 1989

Crossbow is a 1987 historical drama action-adventure television series that aired on CBN Cable Network. The series was produced by Steven North and Richard Schlesinger for Robert Halmi Inc., in co-production with French television network FR3. It was filmed entirely on location in France, mostly in the Auvergne-Rhône-Alpes region (Virieu Castle, Arlempdes, Épierre, Lavaudieu, Tournoel Castle, Pontgibaud Castle, Saint-Christophe, Entremont-le-Vieux, Francheville, Ambérieu-en-Bugey, Pérouges, Chazay Castle), in the Provence-Alpes-Côte d'Azur region (Sénanque Abbey, Oppède, Palais des Papes, Boulbon), and in the Occitania region (Villeneuve-lès-Avignon).

== Premise ==
Set in 14th-century Switzerland, Crossbow follows the adventures of William Tell (played by Will Lyman), a legendary folk hero and expert marksman. The story begins with Tell and his son, Matthew, imprisoned by the tyrannical Governor Hermann Gessler (played by Jeremy Clyde), who seeks to suppress a Swiss uprising against Austrian rule. When Tell is forced to shoot an apple off his son’s head with a crossbow—a feat he successfully accomplishes—he becomes a symbol of resistance. Using his exceptional skills, Tell escapes captivity and leads a rebellion against Gessler’s oppressive regime, encountering both allies and formidable adversaries along the way.

== Cast and characters ==
=== Main characters ===
- William Tell, played by Will Lyman
- Governor Hermann Gessler, played by Jeremy Clyde
- Blade, played by Melinda Mullins
- Roland, played by Valentine Pelka
- Matthew Tell, played by David Barry Gray
- Katrina Tell, played by Anne Lonnberg
- Tyroll, played by Hans Meyer
- Horst, played by Nick Brimble
- Conrad, played by John Otway
- Arris, played by Robert Addie
- Weevil, played by Bernard Spiegel
- Ambrose, played by Bertie Cortez

=== Guest stars ===
- Eleanor, played by Dana Barron
- The Emperor, played by Guy Rolfe
- Prince Ignatius, played by Johnny Crawford
- Gaston, played by Brian Blessed
- Princess, played by Valerie Steffen
- Captain of the Guard, played by Steve Buscemi
- François Arconciel, played by Roger Daltrey
- Sara Guidotti, played by Sarah Michelle Gellar
- Vogel "The Alchemist", played by David Warner
- Stefan, William Tell's mentor, played by Conrad Phillips (Philips had previously played the title role in The Adventures of William Tell)
- Pamenta, played by Imogen Annesley

== Media ==
A television film, Crossbow: The Movie, edited from combined episodes of the series, was released on DVD in 2005, under the title The Adventures of William Tell. The complete series was later released in 2018 on six DVD discs.

An action-adventure game titled Crossbow: the Legend of William Tell, based on the series, was released in 1989 for the Amiga and the Atari ST.

Marvel Comics released several issues of a tie-in comic book, with the characters of Tell and Gessler drawn to the likenesses of Will Lyman and Jeremy Clyde. An illustrated storybook and a novelization were released as well.

The musical score for the series was composed by Stanisław Syrewicz, and used an arrangement of the William Tell Overture by Gioachino Rossini in one of the tracks. A limited printing of the score was released in 1989 on CD and on LP record.

== Episodes ==
=== Season 1 (1987–88) ===
No. overall	No. in season	Title	Directed by	Written by	Original release date
1	1	"The Banquet"	George Mihalka	Edithe Swensen and Steven Bawol	August 30, 1987
2	2	"The Prisoner"	George Mihalka	Edithe Swensen and Steven Bawol	September 6, 1987
3	3	"The Little Soldier"	John David Coles	Anthony Horowitz	September 13, 1987
4	4	"The Scavengers"	John David Coles	Anthony Horowitz	September 20, 1987
5	5	"Reunion"	Chris King	Anthony Horowitz and Steven Bawol	September 27, 1987
6	6	"Albion"	George Mihalka	Edithe Swensen and Steven Bawol	October 4, 1987
7	7	"Sanctuary"	Paul Stanley	Edithe Swensen	October 11, 1987
8	8	"The Dukes of Zharinghen"	Paul Stanley	Edithe Swensen	October 18, 1987
9	9	"The Bet"	Paul Stanley	Edithe Swensen	October 25, 1987
10	10	"The Stallion"	Chris King	Anthony Horowitz and Steven Bawol	November 1, 1987
11	11	"The Imposter"	Allan A. Goldstein	Edithe Swensen	November 8, 1987
12	12	"The Pass"	Allan A. Goldstein	Edithe Swensen	November 15, 1987
13	13	"Misalliance"	Allan A. Goldstein	Edithe Swensen	November 22, 1987
14	14	"The Alchemist"	David Kappes	Harry Kappes	November 29, 1987
15	15	"Possessed!"	Dennis Berry	Mark Princi and Steven Bawol	December 6, 1987
16	16	"The Moor: Part 1"	John David Coles	Mark Princi and Anthony Horowitz	December 13, 1987
17	17	"The Moor: Part 2"	John David Coles	Mark Princi and Anthony Horowitz	December 20, 1987
18	18	"The Four Horsemen"	George Mihalka	Story by : Bernard Frangin; Teleplay by : Steven Bawol and Anthony Horowitz	December 27, 1987
19	19	"The Citadel"	George Mihalka	Story by : Bernard Frangin; Teleplay by : Steven Bawol and Anthony Horowitz	January 3, 1988
20	20	"The Princess"	George Mihalka	Story by : Bernard Frangin; Teleplay by : Steven Bawol and Anthony Horowitz	January 10, 1988
21	21	"Lotus"	Dennis Berry	Anthony Horowitz	January 17, 1988
22	22	"The Physician"	Dennis Berry	Anthony Horowitz	January 24, 1988
23	23	"The Handmaiden"	Jacques Methe	Ranald Graham	January 31, 1988
24	24	"The Rebirth"	Jacques Methe	Ranald Graham	February 7, 1988

=== Season 2 (1988–89) ===
No. overall	No. in season	Title	Directed by	Written by	Original release date
25	1	"Nightmare"	George Mihalka	John Flanagan & Andrew McCulloch	September 3, 1988
26	2	"Birthright"	George Mihalka	Anthony Horowitz	September 10, 1988
27	3	"Trolls"	George Mihalka	Pascal Bancou & Christian Bouveron	September 17, 1988
28	4	"Nemesis"	George Mihalka	David Wilks	September 24, 1988
29	5	"The Pit"	Christian Duguay	Claude Harz	October 1, 1988
30	6	"The Rock"	Christian Duguay	Claude Harz	October 8, 1988
31	7	"The Taking of Castle Tanner"	Christian Duguay	Pascal Bancou & Christian Bouveron	October 15, 1988
32	8	"Fear"	Christian Duguay	David Wilks	October 22, 1988
33	9	"The Emperor: Part 1"	George Mihalka	Steven Bawol	October 29, 1988
34	10	"The Emperor: Part 2"	George Mihalka	Steven Bawol	October 29, 1988
35	11	"The Lost Crusader"	George Mihalka	David Wilks	November 5, 1988
36	12	"Exit the Dragon"	Dennis Berry	John Flanagan & Andrew McCulloch	November 12, 1988
37	13	"Actors"	Dennis Berry	Michelle Princi	November 19, 1988
38	14	"Seekers of the Soul"	Dennis Berry	Claude Harz	November 26, 1988
39	15	"Masterplan"	Richard Schlesinger	Claude Harz	December 3, 1988
40	16	"Ladyship"	Richard Schlesinger	Michelle Princi	December 10, 1988
41	17	"The Promised Land"	Richard Schlesinger	John Flanagan & Andrew McCulloch	December 17, 1988
42	18	"Rejection"	Richard Schlesinger	Claude Harz	December 24, 1988
43	19	"Message to Geneva"	Christian Duguay	Harold Kappes	January 7, 1989
44	20	"The Electors"	Christian Duguay	Steven Bawol	January 14, 1989
45	21	"The Inquisitor"	Dennis Berry	Ranald Graham	January 21, 1989
46	22	"Amnesty"	Christian Duguay	Ranald Graham	January 28, 1989
47	23	"Blood Brothers"	Dennis Berry	Ranald Graham & Claude Harz	February 4, 1989
48	24	"Betrayal"	Dennis Berry	Michelle Princi	February 11, 1989

=== Season 3 (1989) ===
No. overall	No. in season	Title	Directed by	Written by	Original release date
49	1	"The Touch"	Dennis Berry	Ranald Graham	1989
50	2	"Spirit of Rebellion"	Paolo Barzman	Ranald Graham and Mark Lyons	1989
51	3	"Insurrection"	Dennis Berry	Claude Harz and Mark Lyons	1989
52	4	"Doppelganger"	Paolo Barzman	David Wilks	1989
53	5	"Trailbreak"	Paolo Barzman	Ranald Graham	1989
54	6	"The Mission"	Dennis Berry	John Flanagan and Andrew McCulloch	1989
55	7	"The Bounty Twins"	Dennis Berry	Leonard Tuck	1989
56	8	"The Gods"	Christian Duguay	David Wilks	1989
57	9	"Gansari's Zombies"	Dennis Berry	Claude Harz	1989
58	10	"The Shadow"	Christian Duguay	John Flanagan and Andrew McCulloch	1989
59	11	"Gorian the Spider"	Christian Duguay	Claude Harz	1989
60	12	"Forbidden Fruit"	Dennis Berry	Ranald Graham	1989
61	13	"The Lost City"	Dennis Berry	David Wilks	1989
62	14	"The Bridge"	Christian Duguay	David Wilks	1989
63	15	"Silver Rider"	Christian Duguay	Mark Princi	1989
64	16	"The Children"	Mai Zetterling	Mai Zetterling and David Hughes	1989
65	17	"The Magician"	Dennis Berry	Claude Harz	1989
66	18	"The Wind Wagon"	Mai Zetterling	Mai Zetterling and David Hughes	1989
67	19	"Goldilocks"	Dennis Berry	Ranald Graham	1989
68	20	"The Amazon"	Christian Duguay	David Wilks	1989
69	21	"Headhunters"	Christian Duguay	Story by : Robert Halmi Jr. Teleplay by : David Wilks	1989
70	22	"Forbidden Land"	Mai Zetterling	Mai Zetterling and David Hughes	1989
71	23	"Moment of Truth: Part I"	Christian Duguay	Claude Harz	1989
72	24	"Moment of Truth: Part II"	Christian Duguay	Claude Harz	1989
