= Cussac =

Cussac may refer to:

- Cussac, Cantal, a French commune in the department of Cantal
- Cussac, Haute-Vienne, a French commune in the department of Haute-Vienne
- Cussac-Fort-Médoc, a French commune in the department of Gironde
- Cussac-sur-Loire, a French commune in the department of Haute-Loire
- Grotte de Cussac, a cave containing paleolithic art in Le Buisson-de-Cadouin, Dordogne, Aquitaine, France

== People ==
- Jean Cussac (1922–2026), French baritone and music director

== See also ==
- Cusack, a variant of the surname 'de Cussac'
- Cusack (surname)
