= Saint-Arcons-de-Barges =

- Commune
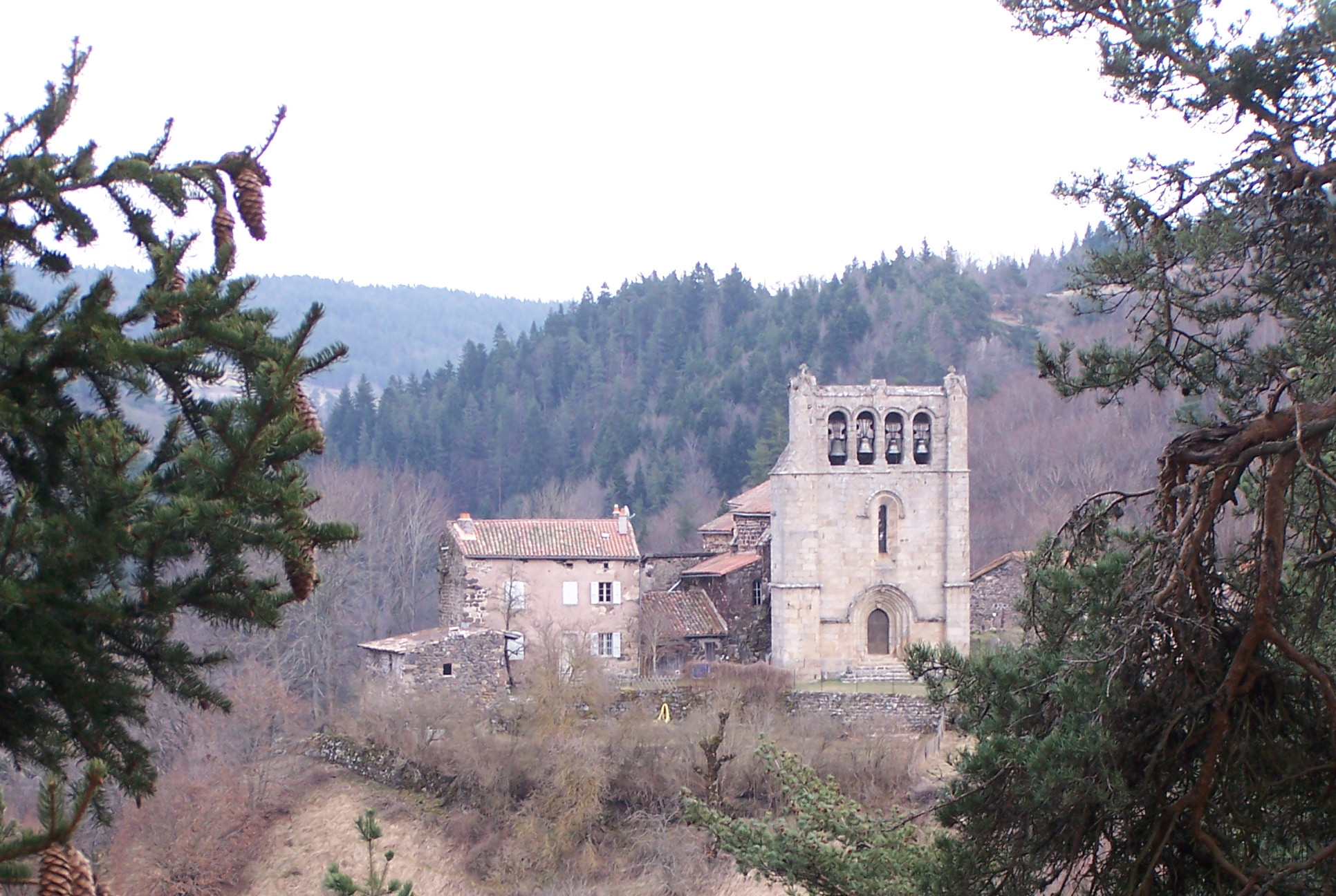
- Location of Saint-Arcons-de-Barges
- Location within France Location within Auvergne-Rhône-Alpes
- Coordinates: 44°50′25″N 3°55′25″E
- Country: France
- Region: Auvergne-Rhône-Alpes
- Department: Haute-Loire
- Arrondissement: Le Puy-en-Velay
- Canton: Velay volcanique
- Intercommunality: Pays de Cayres et de Pradelles

Government
  - Mayor (2020–2026): Lionel Bruchet
- Area^{1}: 15.38 km^{2} (5.94 sq mi)
- Elevation: 960 m (3,150 ft)
- Highest elevation: 1,342 m (4,403 ft)
- Lowest elevation: 825 m (2,707 ft)
- Population (2023): 119
  - Density: 7.74/km^{2} (20.0/sq mi)
- Time zone: UTC+01:00 (CET)
  - Summer (DST): UTC+02:00 (CEST)
- INSEE/Postal code: 43168 /43420
- ^{1} French Land Register data, which excludes lakes, ponds, glaciers > 1 km^{2} (0.386 sq mi or 247 acres) and river estuaries.

Saint-Arcons-de-Barges (French pronunciation: [sɛ̃t‿aʁkɔ̃ də baʁʒ], literally Saint-Arcons of Barges; Occitan: Sent Arcònç de Barjas) is a commune in the Haute-Loire department in south-central France.

== Population ==
Historical population
Year	Pop.	±% p.a.
1968	328	—
1975	265	−3.00%
1982	192	−4.50%
1990	167	−1.73%
1999	118	−3.79%
2007	120	+0.21%
2012	119	−0.17%
2017	121	+0.33%
2023	119	−0.28%
Source: INSEE

== See also ==
- Communes of the Haute-Loire department
