= Haon =

Haon may refer to:

== People ==
- Haon (rapper), South Korean rapper

== Places ==
- HaOn, Israel
- Saint-Haon, France
- Saint-Haon-le-Châtel, France
- Saint-Haon-le-Vieux, France
