= Solignac-sur-Loire =

- Commune
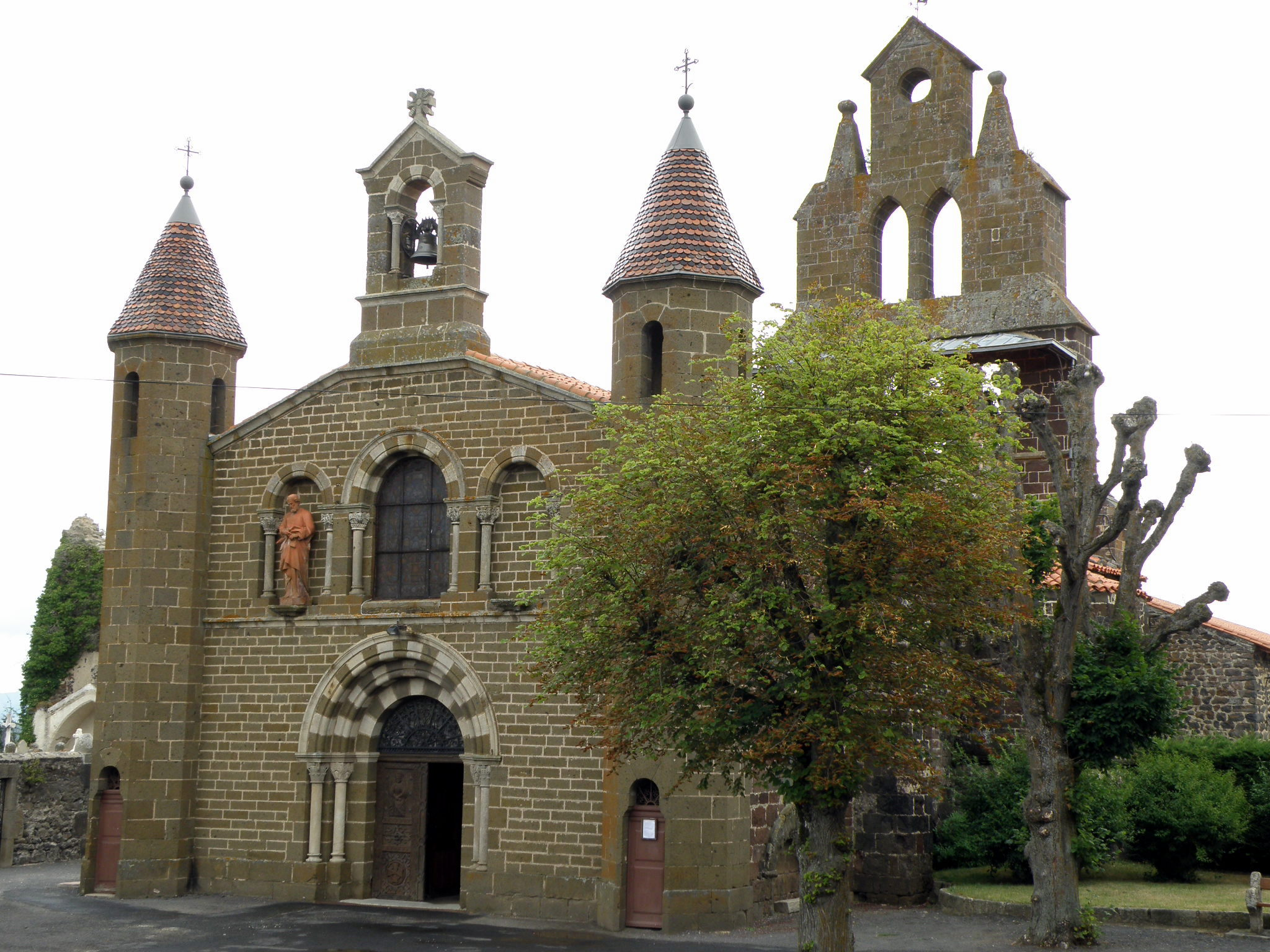

- Coat of arms
- Location of Solignac-sur-Loire
- Location within France Location within Auvergne-Rhône-Alpes
- Coordinates: 44°58′09″N 3°53′14″E
- Country: France
- Region: Auvergne-Rhône-Alpes
- Department: Haute-Loire
- Arrondissement: Le Puy-en-Velay
- Canton: Velay volcanique
- Intercommunality: CA du Puy-en-Velay

Government
  - Mayor (2020–2026): Olivier Teyssier
- Area^{1}: 24 km^{2} (9.3 sq mi)
- Elevation: 858 m (2,815 ft)
- Highest elevation: 1,117 m (3,665 ft)
- Lowest elevation: 655 m (2,149 ft)
- Population (2023): 1,289
  - Density: 54/km^{2} (140/sq mi)
- Time zone: UTC+01:00 (CET)
  - Summer (DST): UTC+02:00 (CEST)
- INSEE/Postal code: 43241 /43370
- ^{1} French Land Register data, which excludes lakes, ponds, glaciers > 1 km^{2} (0.386 sq mi or 247 acres) and river estuaries.

Solignac-sur-Loire (French pronunciation: [sɔliɲak syʁ lwaʁ], literally Solignac on Loire; Occitan: Solanhac) is a commune in the Haute-Loire department in south-central France.

== Population ==
Historical population
Year	Pop.	±% p.a.
1968	793	—
1975	801	+0.14%
1982	937	+2.27%
1990	1,029	+1.18%
1999	1,058	+0.31%
2007	1,174	+1.31%
2012	1,230	+0.94%
2017	1,270	+0.64%
2023	1,289	+0.25%
Source: INSEE

== See also ==
- Communes of the Haute-Loire department
