= Val-de-Virieu =

- Commune
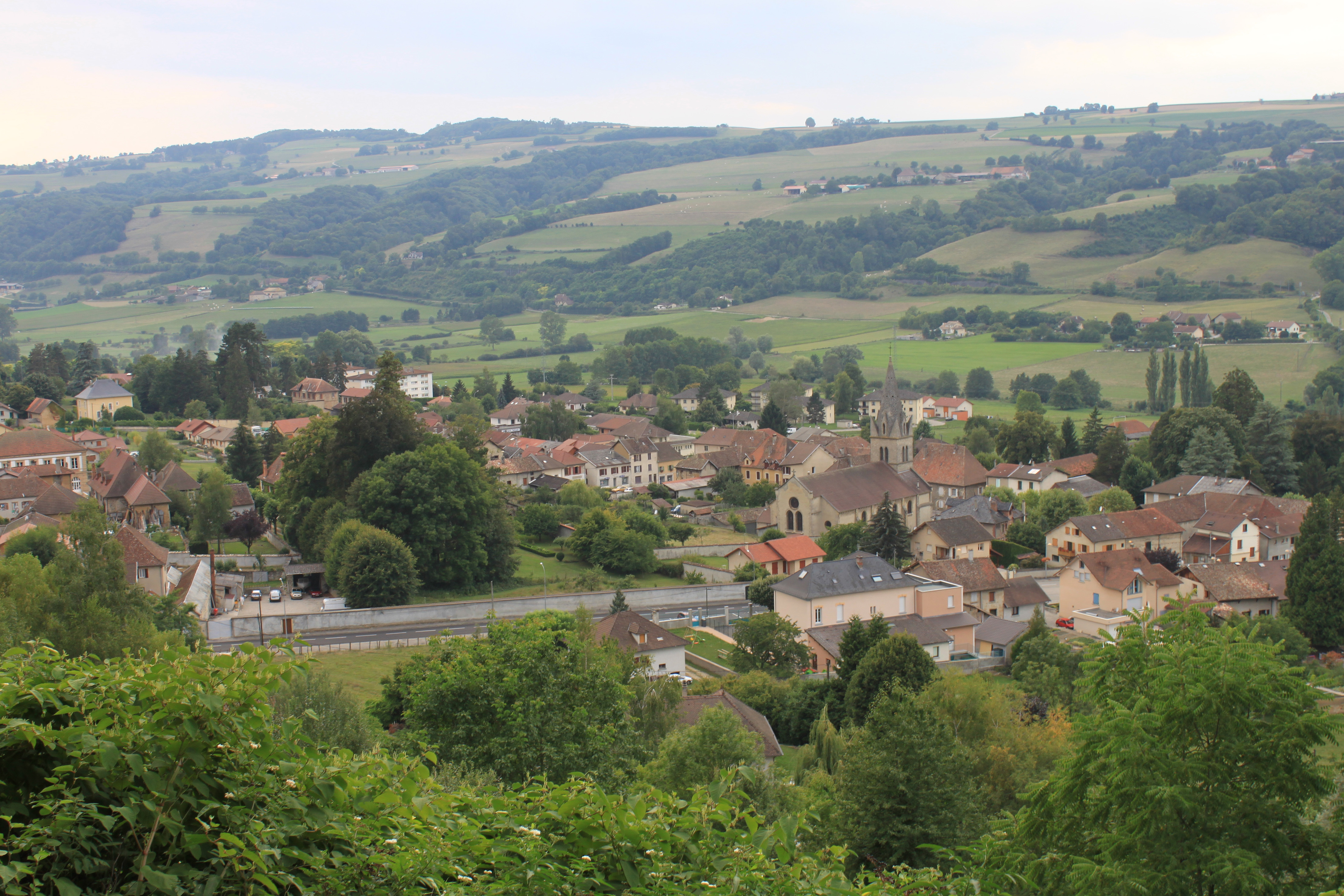
- A general view of Virieu
- Location of Val-de-Virieu
- Location within France Location within Auvergne-Rhône-Alpes
- Coordinates: 45°29′11″N 5°28′34″E
- Country: France
- Region: Auvergne-Rhône-Alpes
- Department: Isère
- Arrondissement: La Tour-du-Pin
- Canton: Le Grand-Lemps
- Intercommunality: Les Vals du Dauphiné

Government
  - Mayor (2020–2026): Michel Morel
- Area^{1}: 16.26 km^{2} (6.28 sq mi)
- Highest elevation: 775 m (2,543 ft)
- Lowest elevation: 381 m (1,250 ft)
- Population (2023): 1,528
  - Density: 93.97/km^{2} (243.4/sq mi)
- Time zone: UTC+01:00 (CET)
  - Summer (DST): UTC+02:00 (CEST)
- INSEE/Postal code: 38560 /38730
- ^{1} French Land Register data, which excludes lakes, ponds, glaciers > 1 km^{2} (0.386 sq mi or 247 acres) and river estuaries.

Val-de-Virieu (French pronunciation: [val də viʁjø]) is a commune in the Isère department in southeastern France. It was established on 1 January 2019 by merger of the former communes of Virieu (the seat) and Panissage.

== See also ==
- Communes of the Isère department
