= Canton of Velay volcanique =

Coordinates: 44.99°N 3.88°E

The canton of Velay volcanique is an administrative division of the Haute-Loire department, south-central France. It was created at the French canton reorganisation which came into effect in March 2015. Its seat is in Cussac-sur-Loire.

It consists of the following communes:

1. Alleyras
2. Arlempdes
3. Bains
4. Barges
5. Le Bouchet-Saint-Nicolas
6. Le Brignon
7. Cayres
8. Costaros
9. Cussac-sur-Loire
10. Lafarre
11. Landos
12. Ouides
13. Pradelles
14. Rauret
15. Saint-Arcons-de-Barges
16. Saint-Christophe-sur-Dolaizon
17. Saint-Étienne-du-Vigan
18. Saint-Haon
19. Saint-Jean-Lachalm
20. Saint-Paul-de-Tartas
21. Séneujols
22. Solignac-sur-Loire
23. Vielprat
