= Saint-Christophe-sur-Dolaizon =

- Commune
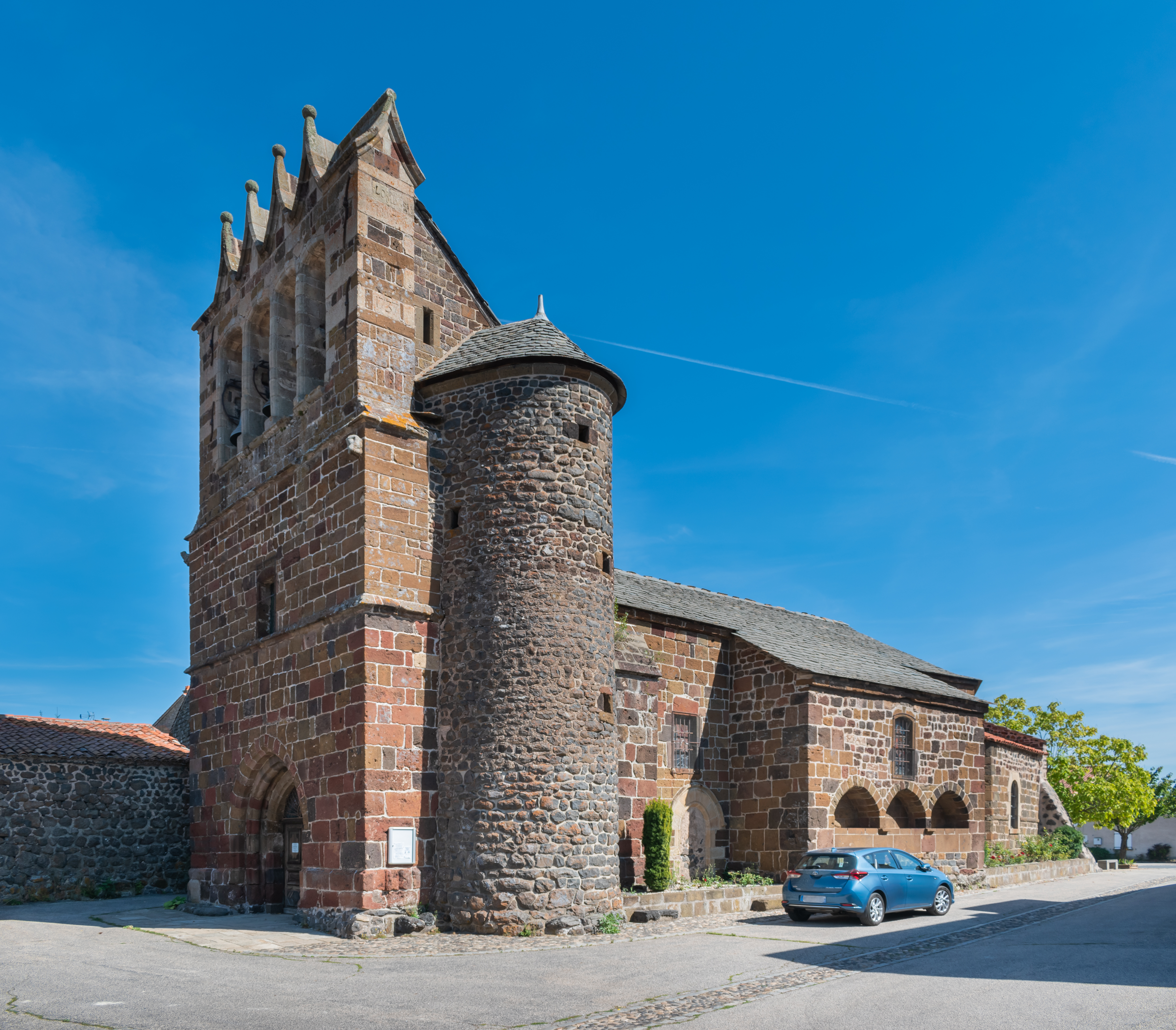
- Location of Saint-Christophe-sur-Dolaizon
- Location within France Location within Auvergne-Rhône-Alpes
- Coordinates: 44°59′52″N 3°49′16″E
- Country: France
- Region: Auvergne-Rhône-Alpes
- Department: Haute-Loire
- Arrondissement: Le Puy-en-Velay
- Canton: Velay volcanique
- Intercommunality: CA du Puy-en-Velay

Government
  - Mayor (2020–2026): Daniel Boyer
- Area^{1}: 27.34 km^{2} (10.56 sq mi)
- Elevation: 900 m (3,000 ft)
- Highest elevation: 1,069 m (3,507 ft)
- Lowest elevation: 763 m (2,503 ft)
- Population (2023): 931
  - Density: 34.1/km^{2} (88.2/sq mi)
- Time zone: UTC+01:00 (CET)
  - Summer (DST): UTC+02:00 (CEST)
- INSEE/Postal code: 43174 /43370
- ^{1} French Land Register data, which excludes lakes, ponds, glaciers > 1 km^{2} (0.386 sq mi or 247 acres) and river estuaries.

Saint-Christophe-sur-Dolaizon (French pronunciation: [sɛ̃ kʁistɔf syʁ dɔlɛzɔ̃]; Auvergnat: Sant Cristofòri de Dolason, before 2025: Saint-Christophe-sur-Dolaison) is a commune in the Haute-Loire department in south-central France.

== Population ==
Historical population
Year	Pop.	±% p.a.
1968	562	—
1975	665	+2.43%
1982	834	+3.29%
1990	919	+1.22%
1999	911	−0.10%
2007	938	+0.37%
2012	960	+0.46%
2017	953	−0.15%
2023	931	−0.39%
Source: INSEE

== See also ==
- Communes of the Haute-Loire department
