= Château d'Arlempdes =

Coordinates: 44.8661°N 3.9238°E

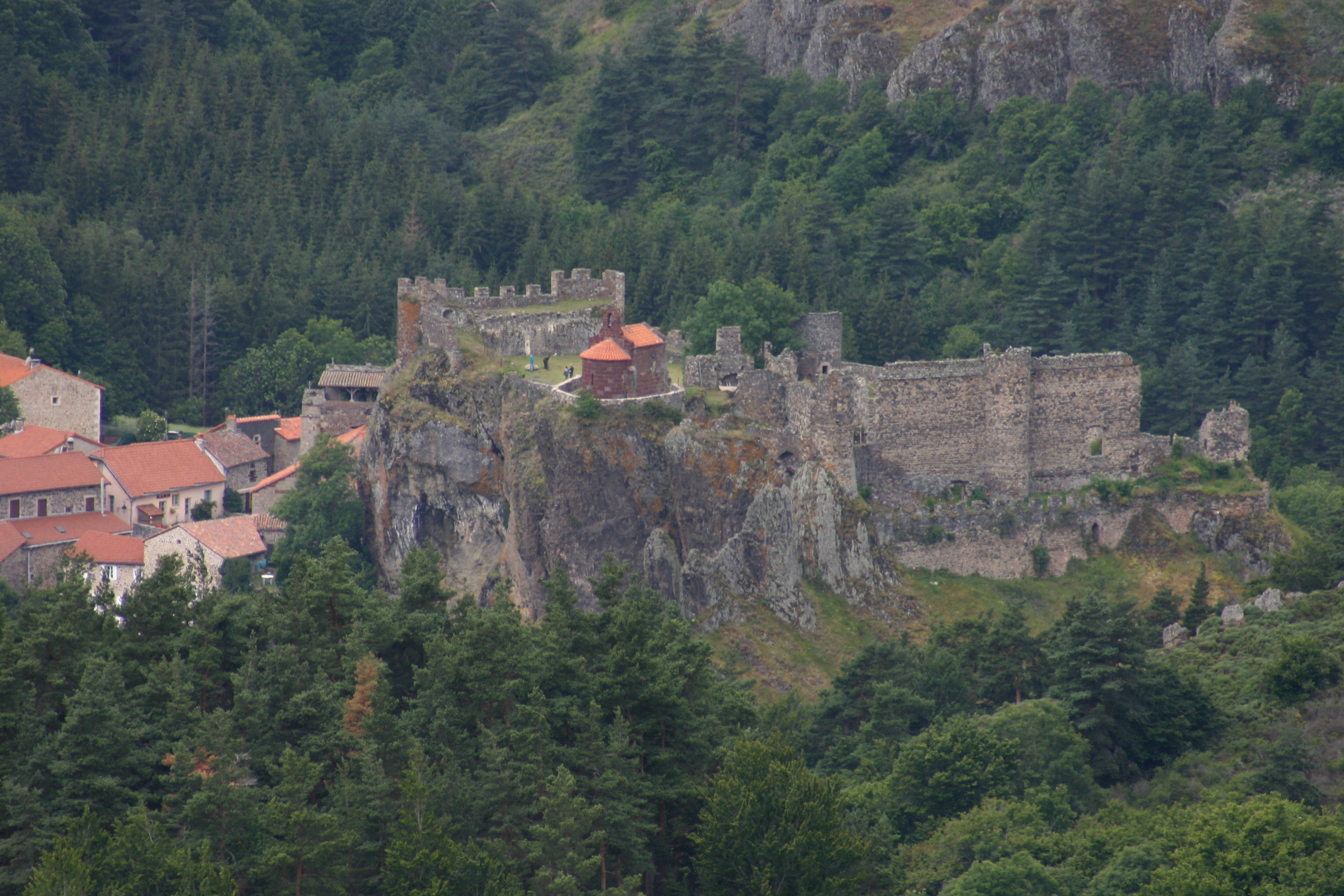
Château d'Arlempdes

The Château d'Arlempdes is a ruined castle in Arlempdes, Haute-Loire, France. It originally dates to the 12th century.
