= Cayres =

- Commune
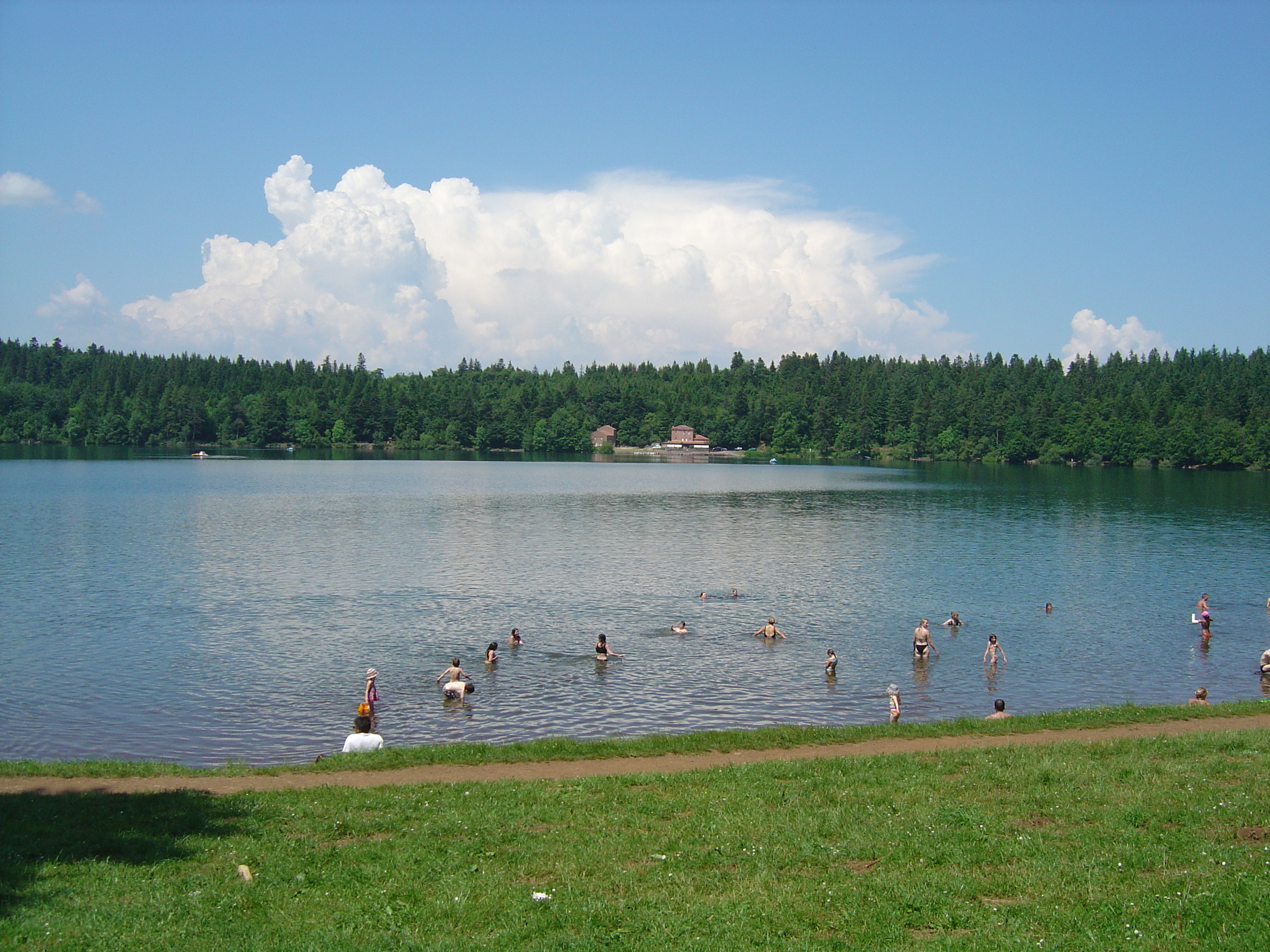
- Beach at Lake Bouchet, with restaurant on the far side

- Coat of arms
- Location of Cayres
- Location within France Location within Auvergne-Rhône-Alpes
- Coordinates: 44°55′35″N 3°48′28″E
- Country: France
- Region: Auvergne-Rhône-Alpes
- Department: Haute-Loire
- Arrondissement: Le Puy-en-Velay
- Canton: Velay volcanique
- Intercommunality: Pays de Cayres et de Pradelles

Government
  - Mayor (2020–2026): Ludovic Gire
- Area^{1}: 29.22 km^{2} (11.28 sq mi)
- Elevation: 1,180 m (3,870 ft)
- Highest elevation: 1,382 m (4,534 ft)
- Lowest elevation: 971 m (3,186 ft)
- Population (2023): 674
  - Density: 23.1/km^{2} (59.7/sq mi)
- Time zone: UTC+01:00 (CET)
  - Summer (DST): UTC+02:00 (CEST)
- INSEE/Postal code: 43042 /43510
- ^{1} French Land Register data, which excludes lakes, ponds, glaciers > 1 km^{2} (0.386 sq mi or 247 acres) and river estuaries.

Cayres (French pronunciation: [kɛʁ]; Occitan: Caires) is a commune in the Haute-Loire department and Auvergne-Rhône-Alpes region of southeast central France.

== Population ==
Historical population
Year	Pop.	±% p.a.
1968	699	—
1975	614	−1.84%
1982	589	−0.59%
1990	511	−1.76%
1999	613	+2.04%
2007	715	+1.94%
2012	706	−0.25%
2017	729	+0.64%
2023	674	−1.30%
Source: INSEE

== See also ==
- Communes of the Haute-Loire department
- Lac du Bouchet
