= Alleyras =

- Commune
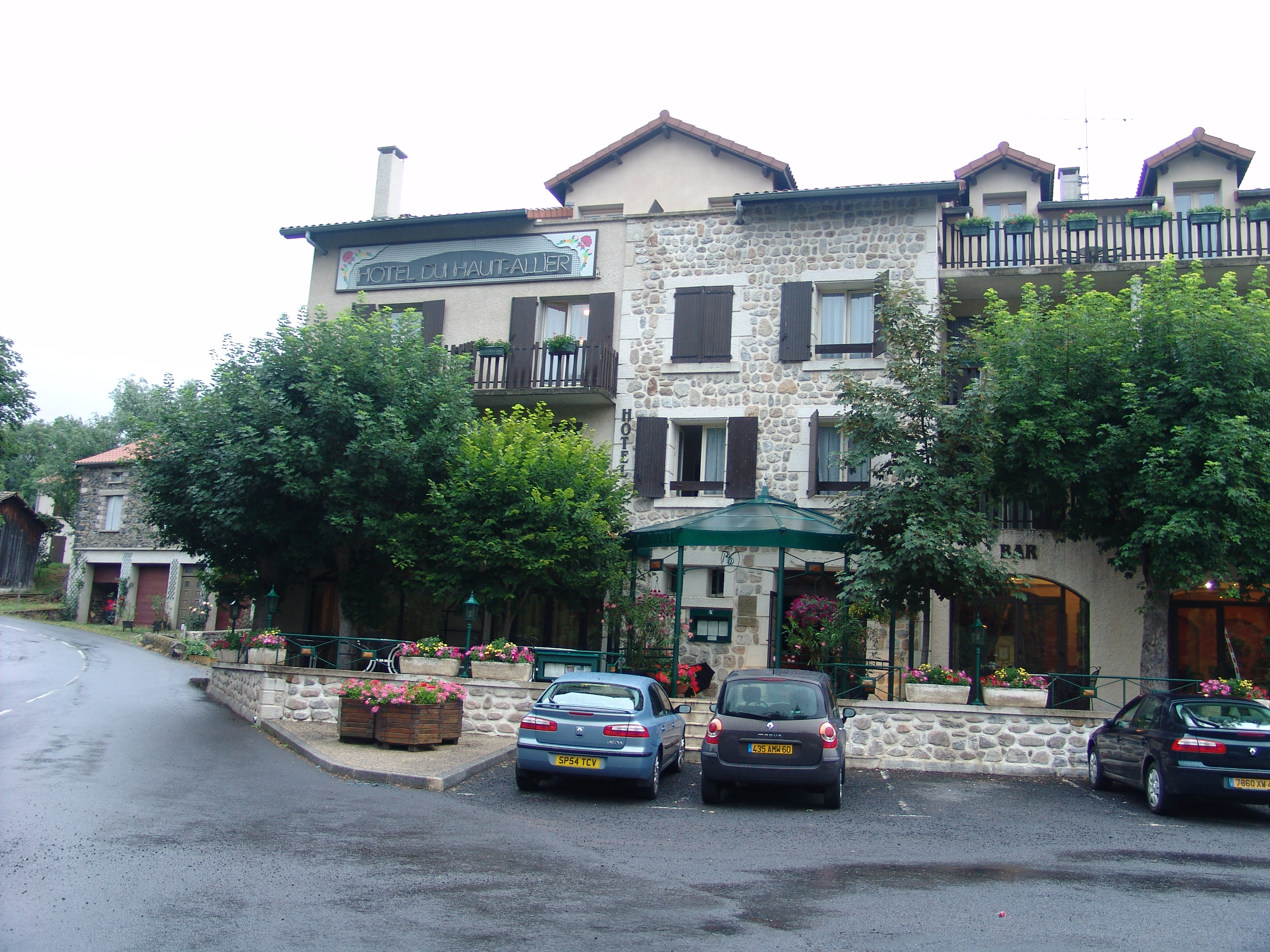
- Haut-Allier Hotel at Pont d'Alleyras

- Coat of arms
- Location of Alleyras
- Location within France Location within Auvergne-Rhône-Alpes
- Coordinates: 44°54′27″N 3°41′00″E
- Country: France
- Region: Auvergne-Rhône-Alpes
- Department: Haute-Loire
- Arrondissement: Le Puy-en-Velay
- Canton: Velay volcanique
- Intercommunality: Pays de Cayres et de Pradelles

Government
  - Mayor (2020–2026): Franck Petit
- Area^{1}: 24.86 km^{2} (9.60 sq mi)
- Elevation: 1,095 m (3,593 ft)
- Highest elevation: 1,074 m (3,524 ft)
- Lowest elevation: 634 m (2,080 ft)
- Population (2023): 152
  - Density: 6.11/km^{2} (15.8/sq mi)
- Time zone: UTC+01:00 (CET)
  - Summer (DST): UTC+02:00 (CEST)
- INSEE/Postal code: 43005 /43580
- ^{1} French Land Register data, which excludes lakes, ponds, glaciers > 1 km^{2} (0.386 sq mi or 247 acres) and river estuaries.

Alleyras (French pronunciation: [alɛʁas]; Occitan: Alairàs) is a commune in the Haute-Loire department in south-central France.

== Population ==
Historical population
Year	Pop.	±% p.a.
1968	379	—
1975	342	−1.46%
1982	290	−2.33%
1990	232	−2.75%
1999	231	−0.05%
2007	175	−3.41%
2012	166	−1.05%
2017	161	−0.61%
2023	152	−0.95%
Source: INSEE

== See also ==
- Communes of the Haute-Loire department
