= Le Bouchet-Saint-Nicolas =

- Commune
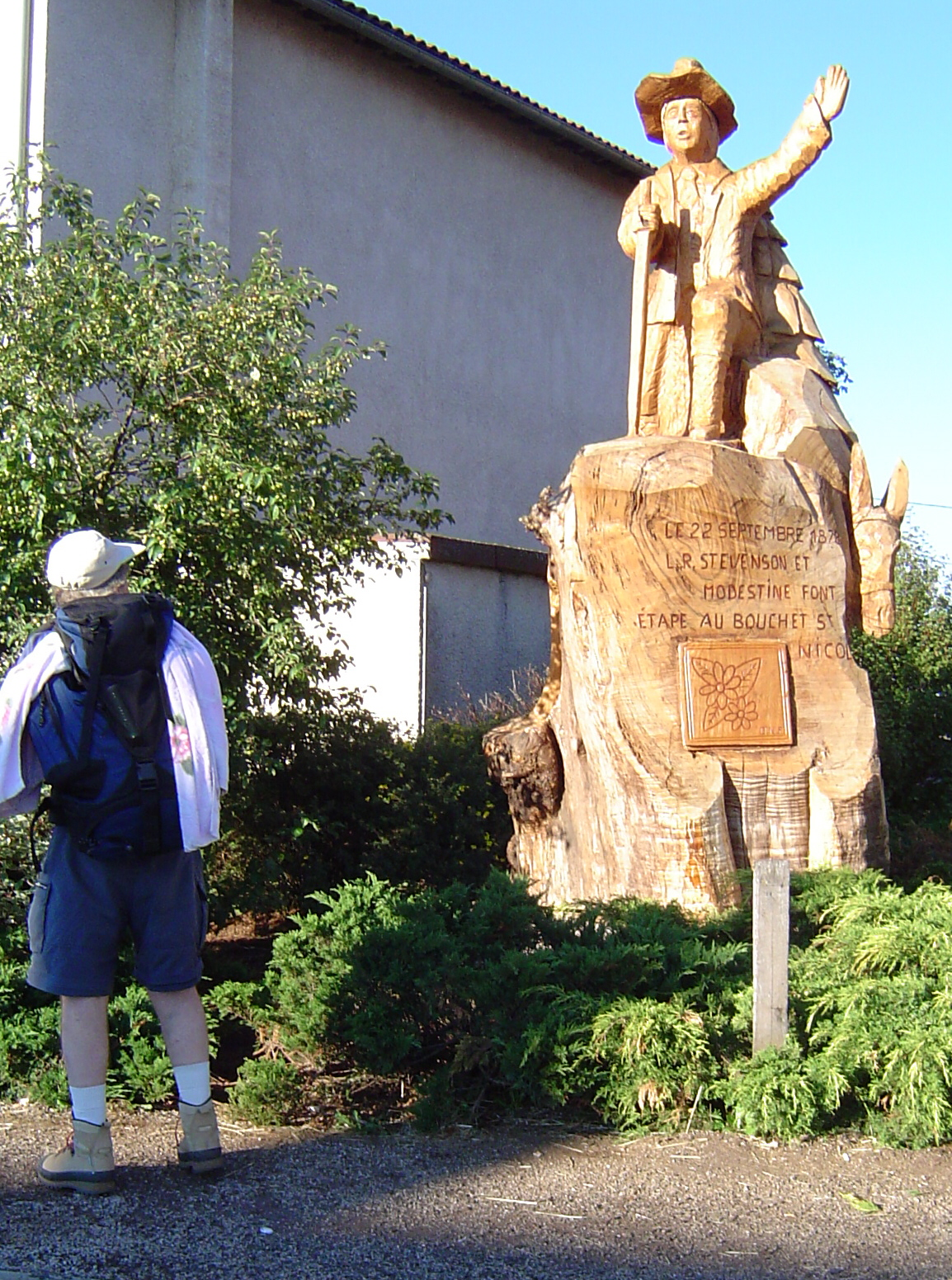
- Monument on the Stevenson Trail
- Location of Le Bouchet-Saint-Nicolas
- Location within France Location within Auvergne-Rhône-Alpes
- Coordinates: 44°53′28″N 3°47′24″E
- Country: France
- Region: Auvergne-Rhône-Alpes
- Department: Haute-Loire
- Arrondissement: Le Puy-en-Velay
- Canton: Velay volcanique

Government
  - Mayor (2023–2026): Alain Vidal
- Area^{1}: 19.31 km^{2} (7.46 sq mi)
- Elevation: 1,228 m (4,029 ft)
- Highest elevation: 1,301 m (4,268 ft)
- Lowest elevation: 1,118 m (3,668 ft)
- Population (2023): 267
  - Density: 13.8/km^{2} (35.8/sq mi)
- Time zone: UTC+01:00 (CET)
  - Summer (DST): UTC+02:00 (CEST)
- INSEE/Postal code: 43037 /43510
- ^{1} French Land Register data, which excludes lakes, ponds, glaciers > 1 km^{2} (0.386 sq mi or 247 acres) and river estuaries.

Le Bouchet-Saint-Nicolas (French pronunciation: [lə buʃɛ sɛ̃ nikɔla]; Occitan: Lo Bochet de Sant Nicolàs) is a commune in the Haute-Loire department in south-central France.

== Personalities ==
The author Robert Louis Stevenson stayed at an inn in the village on 22 September 1878, having failed to find the nearby Lac de Bouchet, and his visit (recorded in his book Travels with a Donkey in the Cévennes) is commemorated by a statue of the author and his donkey, Modestine. The Robert Louis Stevenson Trail (GR 70), a popular long-distance path following Stevenson's approximate route, runs through the village.

== Population ==
Historical population
Year	Pop.	±% p.a.
1968	427	—
1975	369	−2.06%
1982	301	−2.87%
1990	246	−2.49%
1999	236	−0.46%
2007	239	+0.16%
2012	258	+1.54%
2017	280	+1.65%
2023	267	−0.79%
Source: INSEE

== See also ==
- Lac du Bouchet
- Communes of the Haute-Loire department
