= Séneujols =

- Commune
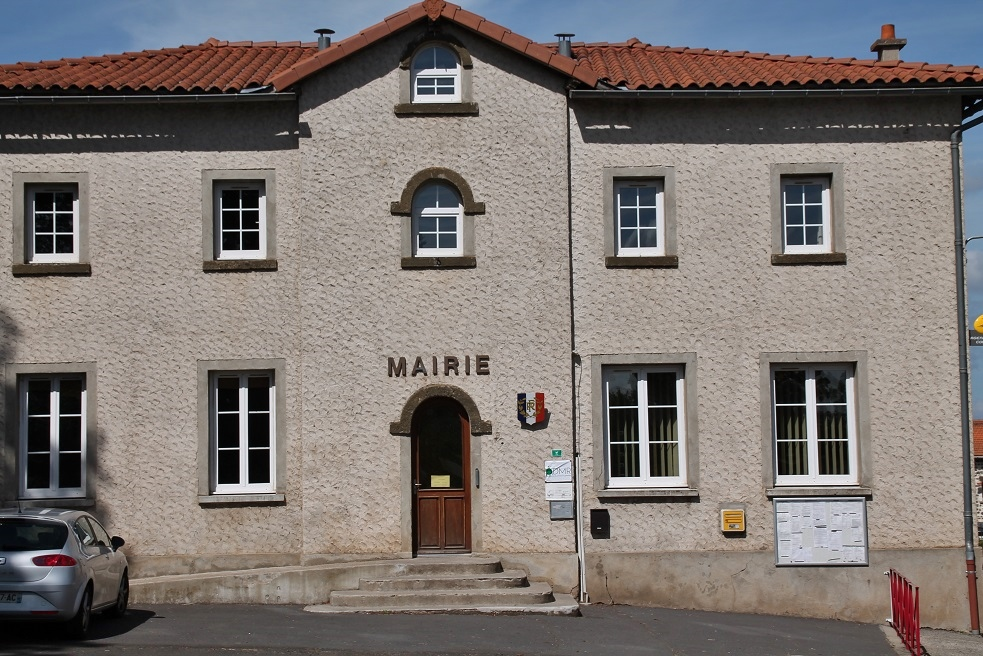
- Town hall
- Location of Séneujols
- Location within France Location within Auvergne-Rhône-Alpes
- Coordinates: 44°57′39″N 3°46′58″E
- Country: France
- Region: Auvergne-Rhône-Alpes
- Department: Haute-Loire
- Arrondissement: Le Puy-en-Velay
- Canton: Velay volcanique

Government
  - Mayor (2020–2026): Serge Boyer
- Area^{1}: 12.24 km^{2} (4.73 sq mi)
- Elevation: 1,030 m (3,380 ft)
- Highest elevation: 1,417 m (4,649 ft)
- Lowest elevation: 985 m (3,232 ft)
- Population (2023): 323
  - Density: 26.4/km^{2} (68.3/sq mi)
- Time zone: UTC+01:00 (CET)
  - Summer (DST): UTC+02:00 (CEST)
- INSEE/Postal code: 43238 /43510
- ^{1} French Land Register data, which excludes lakes, ponds, glaciers > 1 km^{2} (0.386 sq mi or 247 acres) and river estuaries.

Séneujols (French pronunciation: [senøʒɔl]; Occitan: Senuèjol) is a commune in the Haute-Loire department in south-central France.

== Population ==
Historical population
Year	Pop.	±% p.a.
1968	366	—
1975	312	−2.25%
1982	255	−2.84%
1990	238	−0.86%
1999	270	+1.41%
2007	292	+0.98%
2012	309	+1.14%
2017	310	+0.06%
2023	323	+0.69%
Source: INSEE

== See also ==
- Communes of the Haute-Loire department
