= Costaros =

- Commune
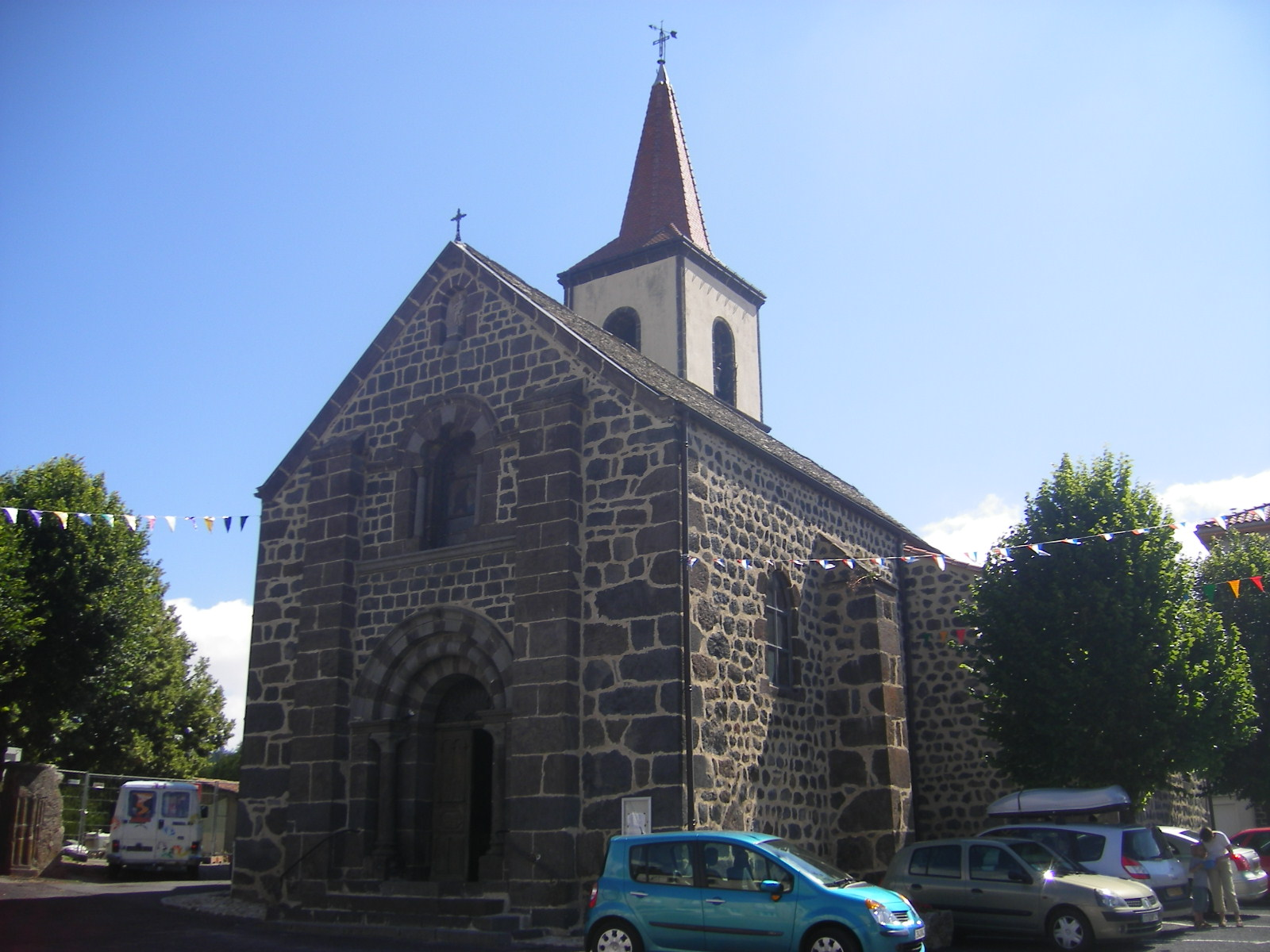
- Location of Costaros
- Location within France Location within Auvergne-Rhône-Alpes
- Coordinates: 44°53′46″N 3°51′04″E
- Country: France
- Region: Auvergne-Rhône-Alpes
- Department: Haute-Loire
- Arrondissement: Le Puy-en-Velay
- Canton: Velay volcanique

Government
  - Mayor (2020–2026): Pierre Gibert
- Area^{1}: 3.85 km^{2} (1.49 sq mi)
- Elevation: 1,074 m (3,524 ft)
- Highest elevation: 1,215 m (3,986 ft)
- Lowest elevation: 1,031 m (3,383 ft)
- Population (2023): 553
  - Density: 144/km^{2} (372/sq mi)
- Time zone: UTC+01:00 (CET)
  - Summer (DST): UTC+02:00 (CEST)
- INSEE/Postal code: 43077 /43490
- ^{1} French Land Register data, which excludes lakes, ponds, glaciers > 1 km^{2} (0.386 sq mi or 247 acres) and river estuaries.

Costaros (French pronunciation: [kɔstaʁo]) is a commune in the Haute-Loire department in south-central France.

== Population ==
Historical population
Year	Pop.	±% p.a.
1968	520	—
1975	507	−0.36%
1982	498	−0.26%
1990	485	−0.33%
1999	549	+1.39%
2007	594	+0.99%
2012	632	+1.25%
2017	544	−2.95%
2023	553	+0.27%
Source: INSEE

== See also ==
- Communes of the Haute-Loire department
