= Panissage =

- Part of Val-de-Virieu
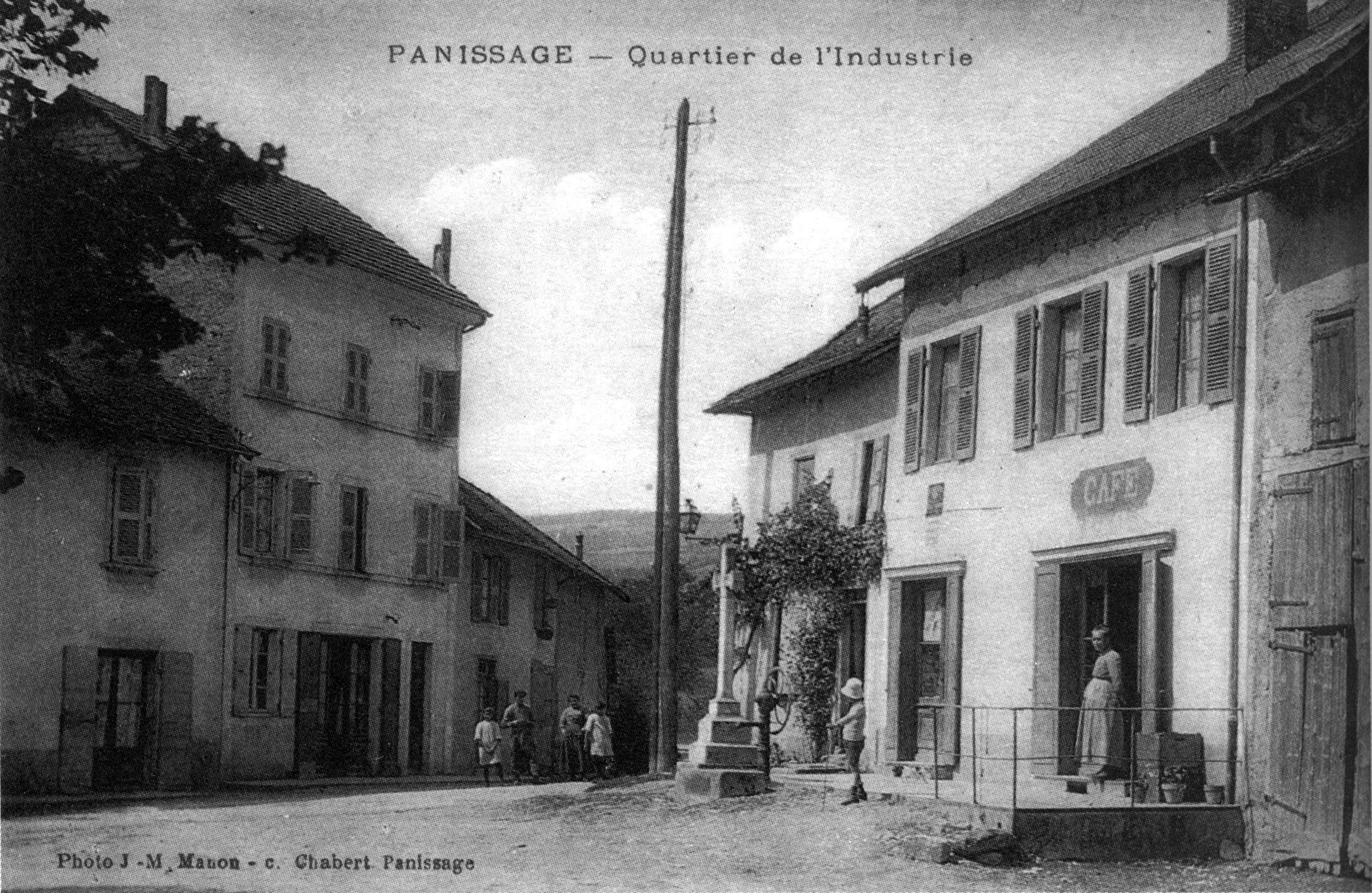
- The industrial quarter of Panissage around 1920
- Location of Panissage
- Location within France Location within Auvergne-Rhône-Alpes
- Coordinates: 45°29′41″N 5°27′49″E
- Country: France
- Region: Auvergne-Rhône-Alpes
- Department: Isère
- Arrondissement: La Tour-du-Pin
- Canton: Le Grand-Lemps
- Commune: Val-de-Virieu
- Area^{1}: 4.88 km^{2} (1.88 sq mi)
- Elevation: 406 m (1,332 ft)
- Highest elevation: 636 m (2,087 ft)
- Lowest elevation: 381 m (1,250 ft)
- Population (2018): 445
  - Density: 91.2/km^{2} (236/sq mi)
- Time zone: UTC+01:00 (CET)
  - Summer (DST): UTC+02:00 (CEST)
- Postal code: 38730
- ^{1} French Land Register data, which excludes lakes, ponds, glaciers > 1 km^{2} (0.386 sq mi or 247 acres) and river estuaries.

Panissage (French pronunciation: [panisaʒ]) is a former commune in the Isère department in southeastern France. On 1 January 2019, it was merged into the new commune Val-de-Virieu.

== Geography ==
The Bourbre forms the commune's southeastern border.

== See also ==
- Communes of the Isère department
