= Saint-Jean-Lachalm =

- Commune
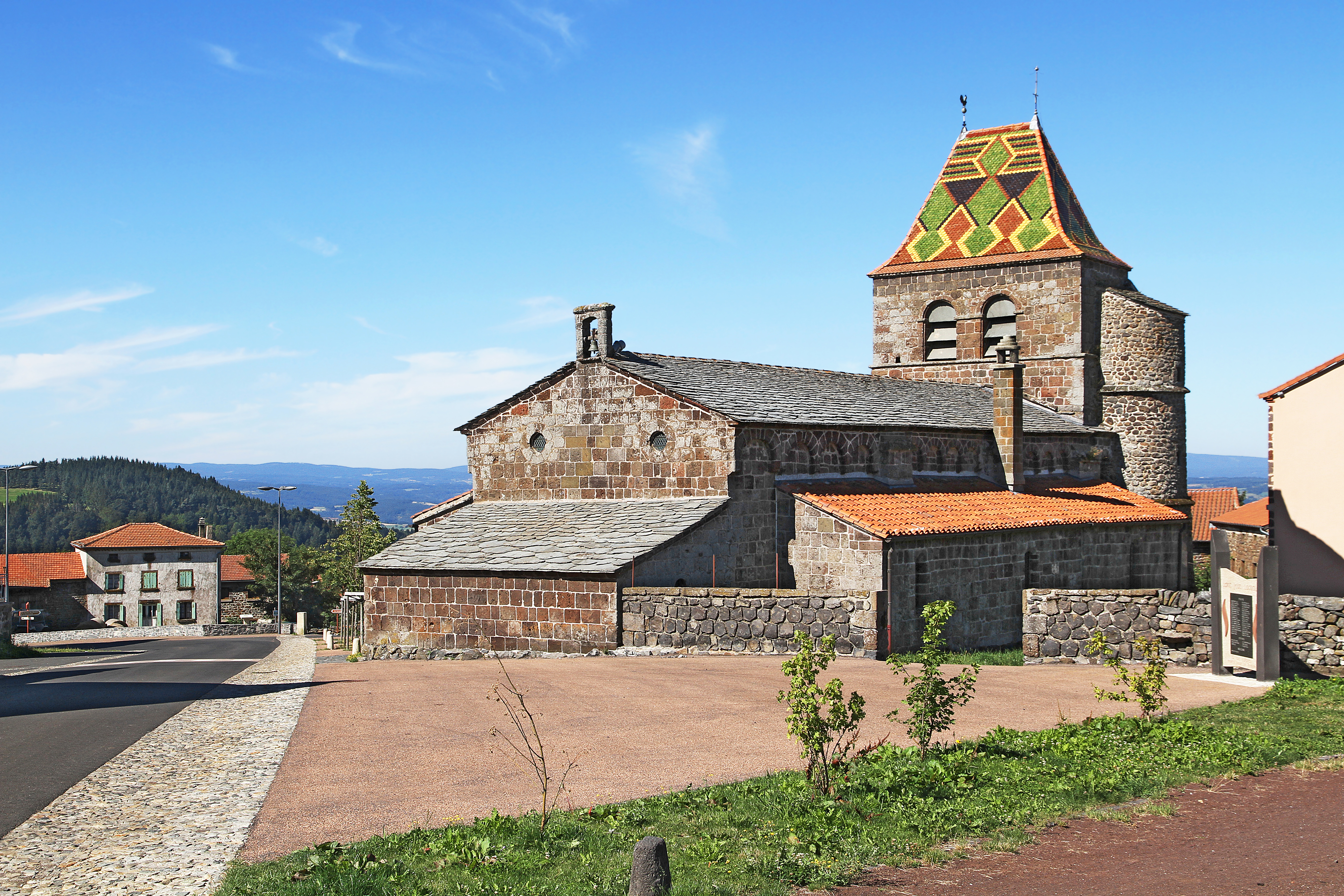
- Location of Saint-Jean-Lachalm
- Location within France Location within Auvergne-Rhône-Alpes
- Coordinates: 44°57′28″N 3°43′10″E
- Country: France
- Region: Auvergne-Rhône-Alpes
- Department: Haute-Loire
- Arrondissement: Le Puy-en-Velay
- Canton: Velay volcanique
- Intercommunality: Pays de Cayres et de Pradelles

Government
  - Mayor (2020–2026): Paul Braud
- Area^{1}: 34.64 km^{2} (13.37 sq mi)
- Elevation: 1,100 m (3,600 ft)
- Highest elevation: 1,417 m (4,649 ft)
- Lowest elevation: 634 m (2,080 ft)
- Population (2023): 306
  - Density: 8.83/km^{2} (22.9/sq mi)
- Time zone: UTC+01:00 (CET)
  - Summer (DST): UTC+02:00 (CEST)
- INSEE/Postal code: 43198 /43510
- ^{1} French Land Register data, which excludes lakes, ponds, glaciers > 1 km^{2} (0.386 sq mi or 247 acres) and river estuaries.

Saint-Jean-Lachalm (French pronunciation: [sɛ̃ ʒɑ̃ laʃalm]; Auvergnat: Sant Joan de la Chalm) is a commune in the Haute-Loire department in south-central France.

== Population ==
Historical population
Year	Pop.	±% p.a.
1968	517	—
1975	461	−1.62%
1982	409	−1.70%
1990	336	−2.43%
1999	281	−1.97%
2007	282	+0.04%
2012	280	−0.14%
2017	289	+0.63%
2023	306	+0.96%
Source: INSEE

== See also ==
- Communes of the Haute-Loire department
