= Rauret =

- Commune
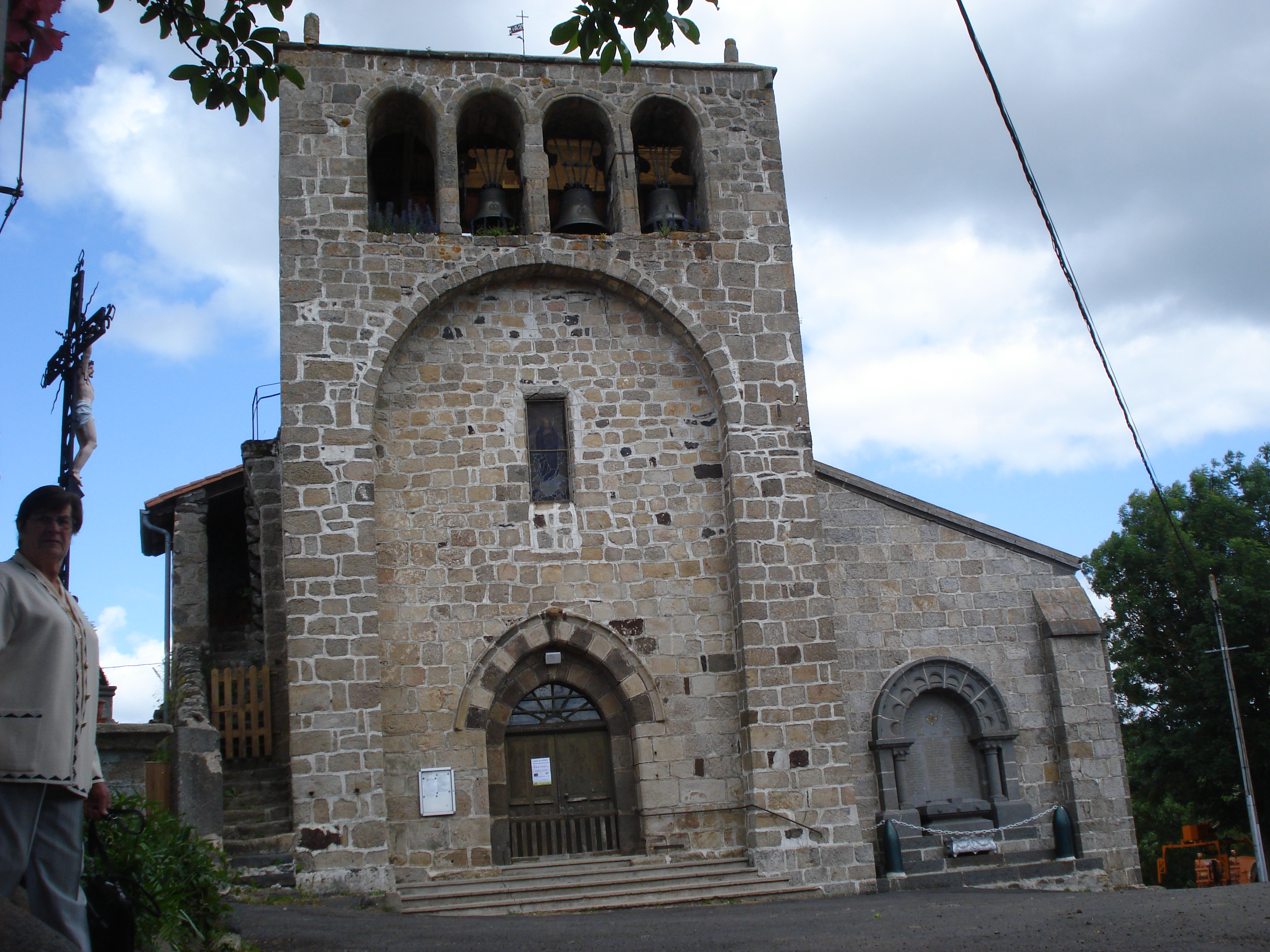
- Location of Rauret
- Location within France Location within Auvergne-Rhône-Alpes
- Coordinates: 44°49′06″N 3°47′30″E
- Country: France
- Region: Auvergne-Rhône-Alpes
- Department: Haute-Loire
- Arrondissement: Le Puy-en-Velay
- Canton: Velay volcanique

Government
  - Mayor (2020–2026): Gerard Gayaud
- Area^{1}: 20.75 km^{2} (8.01 sq mi)
- Elevation: 965 m (3,166 ft)
- Highest elevation: 1,204 m (3,950 ft)
- Lowest elevation: 775 m (2,543 ft)
- Population (2023): 202
  - Density: 9.73/km^{2} (25.2/sq mi)
- Time zone: UTC+01:00 (CET)
  - Summer (DST): UTC+02:00 (CEST)
- INSEE/Postal code: 43160 /43340
- ^{1} French Land Register data, which excludes lakes, ponds, glaciers > 1 km^{2} (0.386 sq mi or 247 acres) and river estuaries.

Rauret (French pronunciation: [ʁoʁɛ]) is a commune in the Haute-Loire department in south-central France.

== Population ==
Historical population
| Year | Pop. | ±% p.a. |
|---|---|---|
| 1968 | 344 | — |
| 1975 | 276 | −3.10% |
| 1982 | 259 | −0.90% |
| 1990 | 178 | −4.58% |
| 1999 | 139 | −2.71% |
| 2007 | 174 | +2.85% |
| 2012 | 175 | +0.11% |
| 2017 | 195 | +2.19% |
| 2023 | 202 | +0.59% |
Source: INSEE

== See also ==
- Communes of the Haute-Loire department
