= Le Brignon =

- Commune
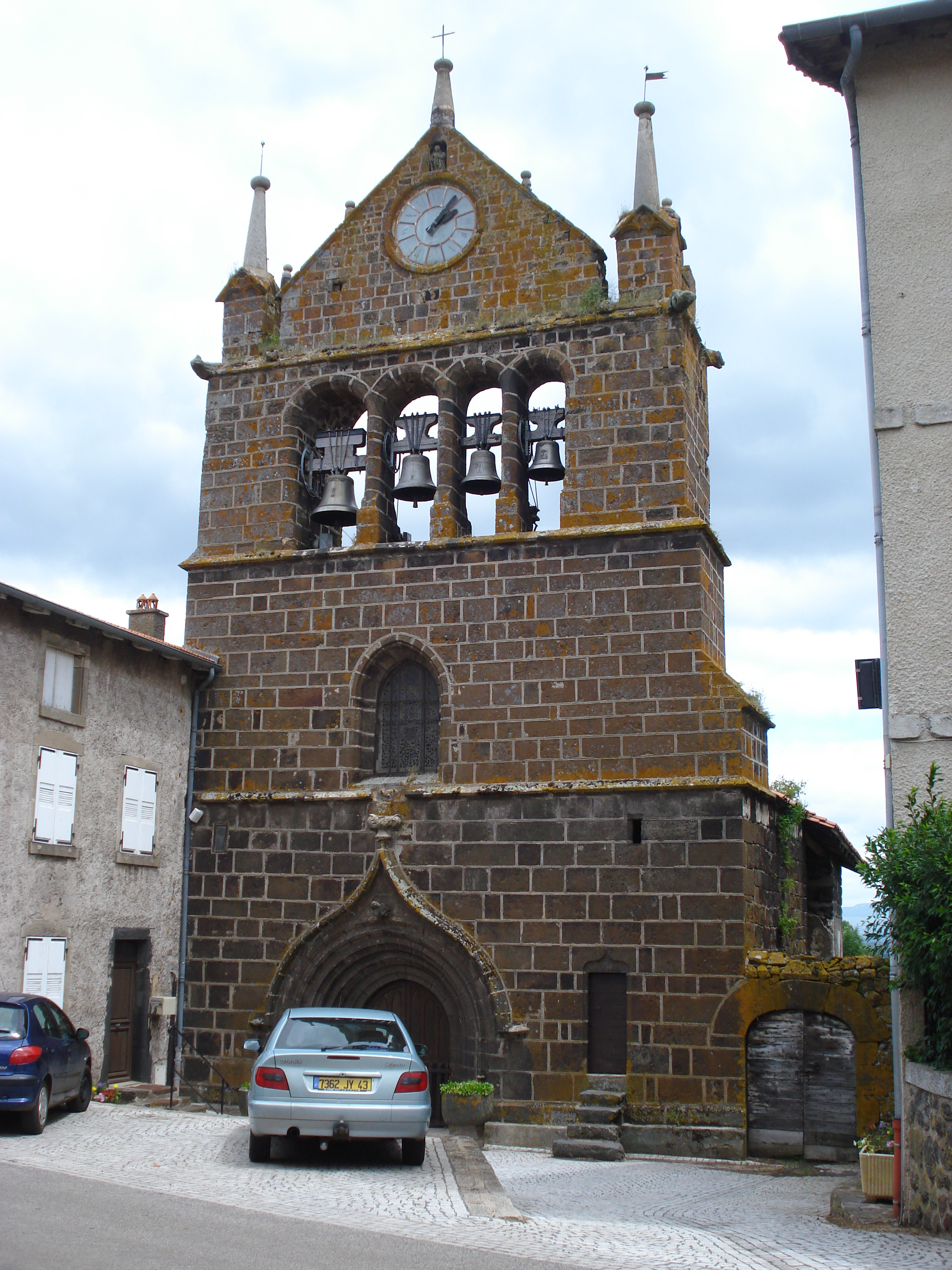

- Coat of arms
- Location of Le Brignon
- Location within France Location within Auvergne-Rhône-Alpes
- Coordinates: 44°56′10″N 3°52′51″E
- Country: France
- Region: Auvergne-Rhône-Alpes
- Department: Haute-Loire
- Arrondissement: Le Puy-en-Velay
- Canton: Velay volcanique
- Intercommunality: CA du Puy-en-Velay

Government
  - Mayor (2020–2026): Jérôme Bay
- Area^{1}: 34.9 km^{2} (13.5 sq mi)
- Elevation: 954 m (3,130 ft)
- Highest elevation: 1,127 m (3,698 ft)
- Lowest elevation: 698 m (2,290 ft)
- Population (2023): 617
  - Density: 17.7/km^{2} (45.8/sq mi)
- Time zone: UTC+01:00 (CET)
  - Summer (DST): UTC+02:00 (CEST)
- INSEE/Postal code: 43039 /43370
- ^{1} French Land Register data, which excludes lakes, ponds, glaciers > 1 km^{2} (0.386 sq mi or 247 acres) and river estuaries.

Le Brignon (French pronunciation: [lə bʁiɲɔ̃]; Occitan: Lo Brinhon) is a commune in the Haute-Loire department in south-central France.

== Population ==
Historical population
| Year | Pop. | ±% p.a. |
|---|---|---|
| 1968 | 745 | — |
| 1975 | 664 | −1.63% |
| 1982 | 577 | −1.99% |
| 1990 | 542 | −0.78% |
| 1999 | 544 | +0.04% |
| 2007 | 576 | +0.72% |
| 2012 | 599 | +0.79% |
| 2017 | 601 | +0.07% |
| 2023 | 617 | +0.44% |
Source: INSEE

== See also ==
- Communes of the Haute-Loire department
