= Ouides =

- Commune
- Location of Ouides
- Location within France Location within Auvergne-Rhône-Alpes
- Coordinates: 44°54′16″N 3°44′18″E
- Country: France
- Region: Auvergne-Rhône-Alpes
- Department: Haute-Loire
- Arrondissement: Le Puy-en-Velay
- Canton: Velay volcanique

Government
  - Mayor (2022–2026): Patrick Martel
- Area^{1}: 10.69 km^{2} (4.13 sq mi)
- Elevation: 1,050 m (3,440 ft)
- Highest elevation: 1,286 m (4,219 ft)
- Lowest elevation: 798 m (2,618 ft)
- Population (2023): 51
  - Density: 4.8/km^{2} (12/sq mi)
- Time zone: UTC+01:00 (CET)
  - Summer (DST): UTC+02:00 (CEST)
- INSEE/Postal code: 43145 /43510
- ^{1} French Land Register data, which excludes lakes, ponds, glaciers > 1 km^{2} (0.386 sq mi or 247 acres) and river estuaries.

Ouides (French pronunciation: [wid]; Occitan: Oides) is a commune in the Haute-Loire department in south-central France.

== Population ==
Historical population
Year	Pop.	±% p.a.
1968	136	—
1975	115	−2.37%
1982	94	−2.84%
1990	76	−2.62%
1999	60	−2.59%
2007	56	−0.86%
2012	55	−0.36%
2017	57	+0.72%
2023	51	−1.84%
Source: INSEE

== See also ==
- Communes of the Haute-Loire department
