= Vielprat =

- Commune
- Location of Vielprat
- Location within France Location within Auvergne-Rhône-Alpes
- Coordinates: 44°51′19″N 3°57′17″E
- Country: France
- Region: Auvergne-Rhône-Alpes
- Department: Haute-Loire
- Arrondissement: Le Puy-en-Velay
- Canton: Velay volcanique

Government
  - Mayor (2020–2026): Dany Jouffroy
- Area^{1}: 7.24 km^{2} (2.80 sq mi)
- Elevation: 930 m (3,050 ft)
- Highest elevation: 1,112 m (3,648 ft)
- Lowest elevation: 791 m (2,595 ft)
- Population (2023): 70
  - Density: 9.7/km^{2} (25/sq mi)
- Time zone: UTC+01:00 (CET)
  - Summer (DST): UTC+02:00 (CEST)
- INSEE/Postal code: 43263 /43490
- ^{1} French Land Register data, which excludes lakes, ponds, glaciers > 1 km^{2} (0.386 sq mi or 247 acres) and river estuaries.

Vielprat (French pronunciation: [vjɛlpʁa]; Occitan: Vièlhprat) is a commune in the Haute-Loire department in south-central France.

== Population ==
Historical population
Year	Pop.	±% p.a.
1968	135	—
1975	119	−1.79%
1982	109	−1.25%
1990	84	−3.20%
1999	66	−2.64%
2007	64	−0.38%
2012	58	−1.95%
2017	55	−1.06%
2023	70	+4.10%
Source: INSEE

== See also ==
- Communes of the Haute-Loire department
