= Saint-Paul-de-Tartas =

- Commune
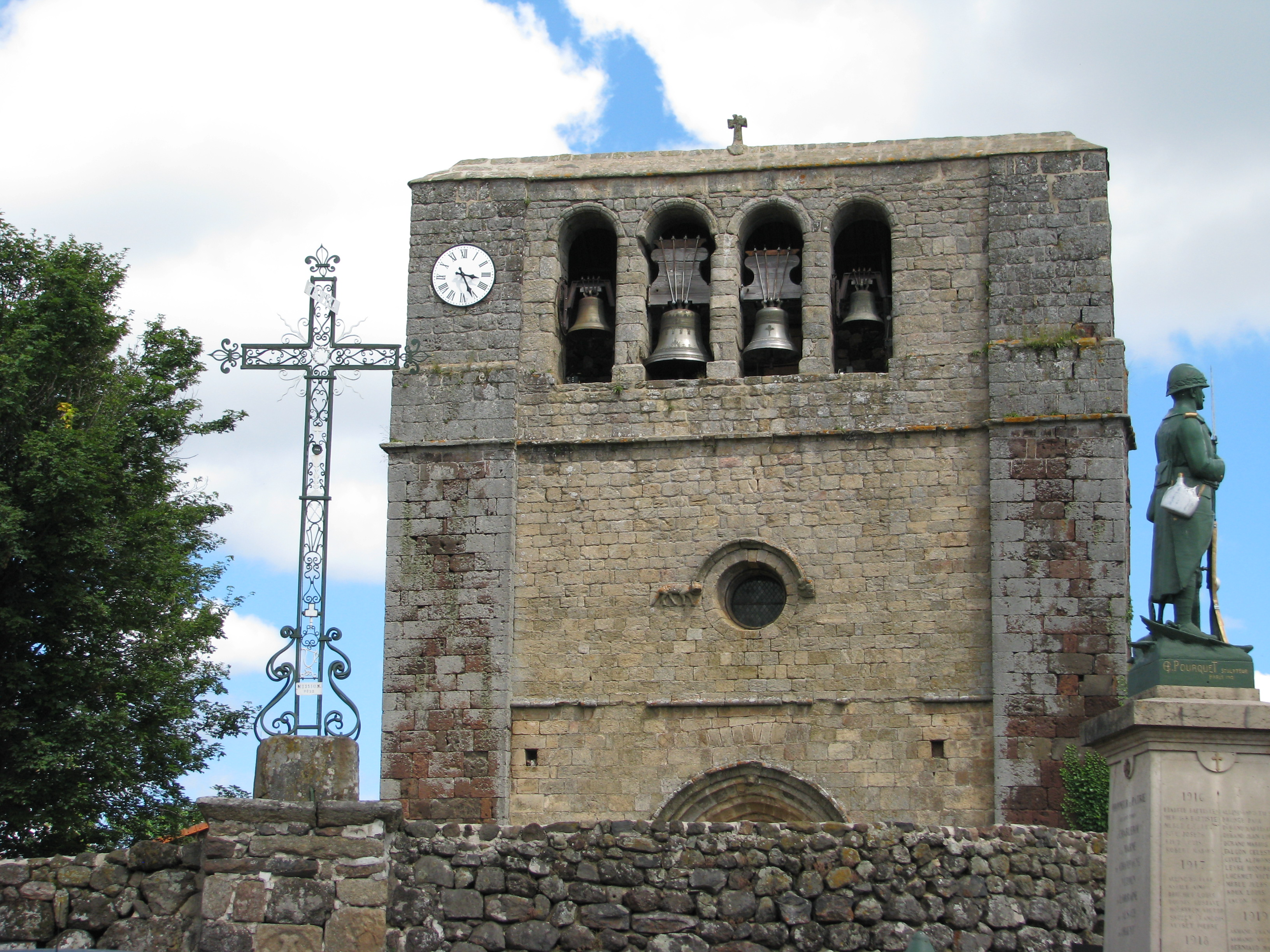
- Bell tower

- Coat of arms
- Location of Saint-Paul-de-Tartas
- Location within France Location within Auvergne-Rhône-Alpes
- Coordinates: 44°48′16″N 3°54′27″E
- Country: France
- Region: Auvergne-Rhône-Alpes
- Department: Haute-Loire
- Arrondissement: Le Puy-en-Velay
- Canton: Velay volcanique
- Intercommunality: Pays de Cayres et de Pradelles

Government
  - Mayor (2020–2026): Marie-Laure Mugnier
- Area^{1}: 27.47 km^{2} (10.61 sq mi)
- Elevation: 1,200 m (3,900 ft)
- Highest elevation: 1,342 m (4,403 ft)
- Lowest elevation: 933 m (3,061 ft)
- Population (2023): 204
  - Density: 7.43/km^{2} (19.2/sq mi)
- Time zone: UTC+01:00 (CET)
  - Summer (DST): UTC+02:00 (CEST)
- INSEE/Postal code: 43215 /43420
- ^{1} French Land Register data, which excludes lakes, ponds, glaciers > 1 km^{2} (0.386 sq mi or 247 acres) and river estuaries.

Saint-Paul-de-Tartas (French pronunciation: [sɛ̃ pɔl də taʁtas]) is a commune in the Haute-Loire department in south-central France.

== Population ==
Historical population
Year	Pop.	±% p.a.
1968	514	—
1975	415	−3.01%
1982	341	−2.77%
1990	270	−2.88%
1999	244	−1.12%
2007	194	−2.83%
2012	202	+0.81%
2017	194	−0.80%
2023	204	+0.84%
Source: INSEE

== See also ==
- Communes of the Haute-Loire department
