= Saint-Étienne-du-Vigan =

- Commune
- Location of Saint-Étienne-du-Vigan
- Location within France Location within Auvergne-Rhône-Alpes
- Coordinates: 44°46′51″N 3°50′10″E
- Country: France
- Region: Auvergne-Rhône-Alpes
- Department: Haute-Loire
- Arrondissement: Le Puy-en-Velay
- Canton: Velay volcanique
- Intercommunality: Pays de Cayres et de Pradelles

Government
  - Mayor (2020–2026): Alain Enjolras
- Area^{1}: 9.43 km^{2} (3.64 sq mi)
- Elevation: 935 m (3,068 ft)
- Highest elevation: 1,164 m (3,819 ft)
- Lowest elevation: 872 m (2,861 ft)
- Population (2023): 95
  - Density: 10/km^{2} (26/sq mi)
- Time zone: UTC+01:00 (CET)
  - Summer (DST): UTC+02:00 (CEST)
- INSEE/Postal code: 43180 /43420
- ^{1} French Land Register data, which excludes lakes, ponds, glaciers > 1 km^{2} (0.386 sq mi or 247 acres) and river estuaries.

Saint-Étienne-du-Vigan (French pronunciation: [sɛ̃.t‿etjɛn dy viɡɑ̃]; Auvergnat: Sent Estève dau Vigan) is a commune in the Haute-Loire department in south-central France.

== Population ==
Historical population
Year	Pop.	±% p.a.
1968	228	—
1975	194	−2.28%
1982	134	−5.15%
1990	110	−2.44%
1999	110	+0.00%
2007	120	+1.09%
2012	107	−2.27%
2017	100	−1.34%
2023	95	−0.85%
Source: INSEE

== See also ==
- Communes of the Haute-Loire department
