= Lac du Bouchet =

French lake

Bouchet lake
- Lac du Bouchet
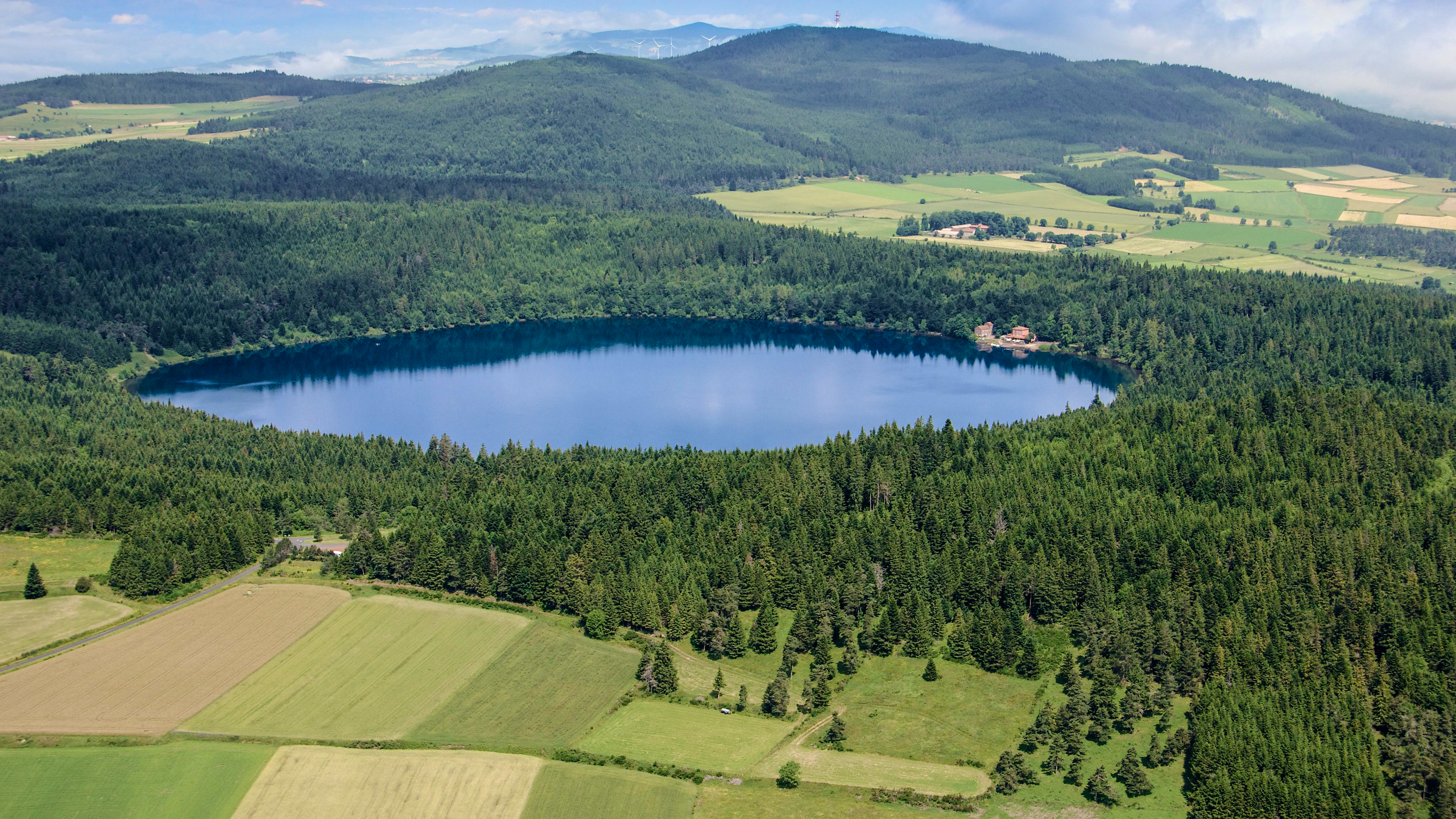

- Location within Auvergne-Rhône-Alpes Location within France
- Interactive map of Bouchet lake
- Location: Haute-Loire
- Coordinates: 44°54′33″N 3°47′25″E
- Type: crater lake
- Basin countries: France
- Surface area: 44 ha (110 acres)
- Max. depth: 28 m (92 ft)
- Surface elevation: 1,208 m (3,963 ft)

Bouchet lake (or Lake of Bouchet; French: Lac du Bouchet) is located in Haute-Loire, France, near Le Puy-en-Velay, in the Devès Massif. It is about 1.6 km (one mile) north of the village of Le Bouchet-Saint-Nicolas. It is situated within the territories of the communes of Cayres and Le Bouchet-Saint-Nicolas.

Bouchet is a crater lake formed from an old volcano, and thus roughly circular. It is a little more than half a mile from rim to rim and surrounded by woodlands. It is at an altitude of 1,208 m (3,963 feet).
