= Château de Virieu (Isère) =

Castle in Auvergne-Rhône-Alpes, France

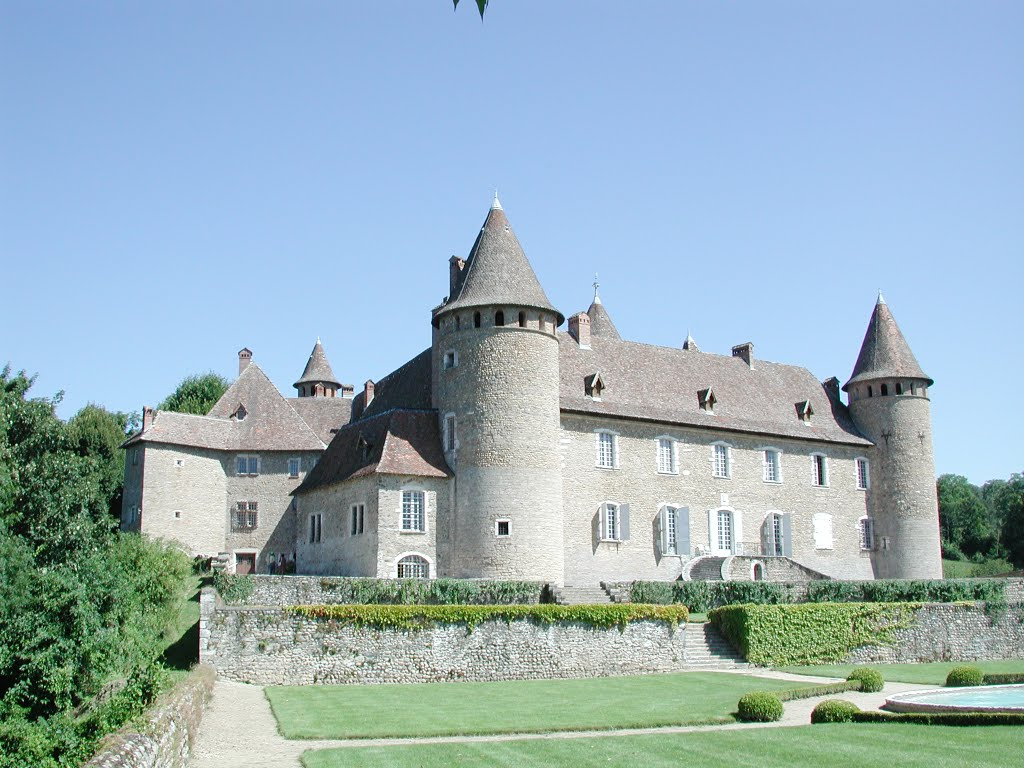

- Location within France

General information
- Coordinates: 45°28′46″N 5°28′45″E

The Château de Virieu is an historic castle in Virieu, Isère, Rhône-Alpes, France.

== History ==
It was built in the 15th century.

== Architectural significance ==
It has been listed as an official historical monument by the French Ministry of Culture since 1990.
