= Arlempdes =

- Commune
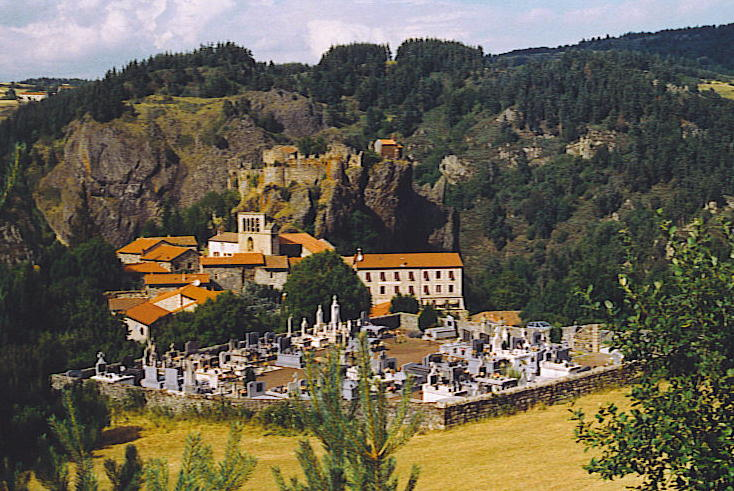
- Village of Arlempdes with Château d'Arlempdes beyond
- Location of Arlempdes
- Location within France Location within Auvergne-Rhône-Alpes
- Coordinates: 44°51′58″N 3°55′26″E
- Country: France
- Region: Auvergne-Rhône-Alpes
- Department: Haute-Loire
- Arrondissement: Le Puy-en-Velay
- Canton: Velay volcanique
- Intercommunality: Pays de Cayres et de Pradelles

Government
  - Mayor (2020–2026): Daniel Liaboeuf
- Area^{1}: 13.74 km^{2} (5.31 sq mi)
- Elevation: 840 m (2,760 ft)
- Highest elevation: 1,166 m (3,825 ft)
- Lowest elevation: 769 m (2,523 ft)
- Population (2023): 156
  - Density: 11.4/km^{2} (29.4/sq mi)
- Time zone: UTC+01:00 (CET)
  - Summer (DST): UTC+02:00 (CEST)
- INSEE/Postal code: 43008 /43490
- ^{1} French Land Register data, which excludes lakes, ponds, glaciers > 1 km^{2} (0.386 sq mi or 247 acres) and river estuaries.

Arlempdes (French pronunciation: [aʁlɑ̃d]; Occitan: Arlemde) is a commune in the Haute-Loire department in south-central France. It is a member of Les Plus Beaux Villages de France (The Most Beautiful Villages of France) Association.

== Population ==
Historical population
Year	Pop.	±% p.a.
1968	211	—
1975	220	+0.60%
1982	182	−2.67%
1990	142	−3.05%
1999	114	−2.41%
2007	131	+1.75%
2012	133	+0.30%
2017	138	+0.74%
2023	156	+2.06%
Source: INSEE

== See also ==
- Communes of the Haute-Loire department
