= Saint-Haon =

- Commune
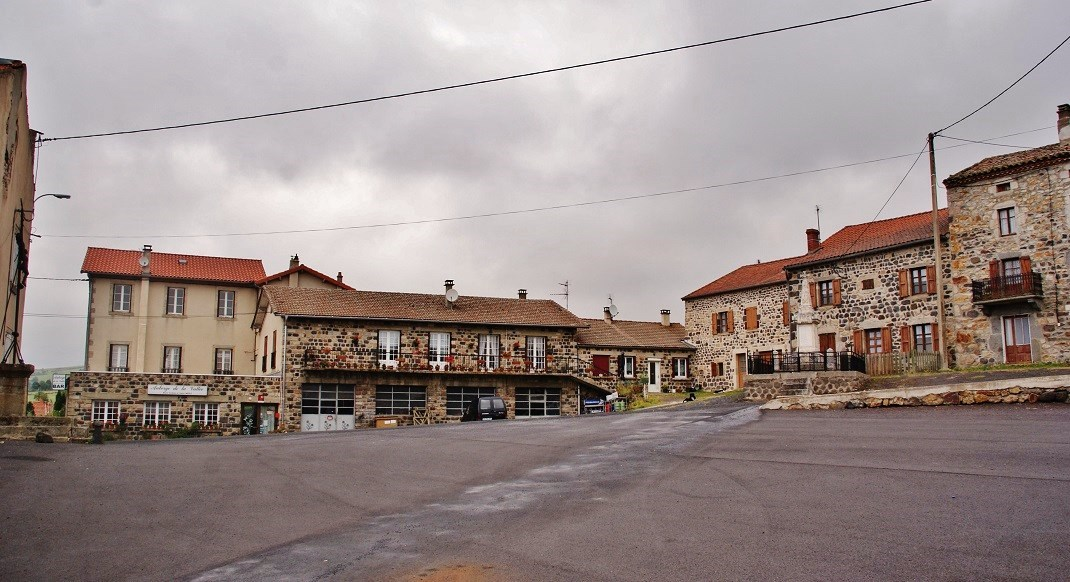
- Location of Saint-Haon
- Location within France Location within Auvergne-Rhône-Alpes
- Coordinates: 44°50′49″N 3°45′33″E
- Country: France
- Region: Auvergne-Rhône-Alpes
- Department: Haute-Loire
- Arrondissement: Le Puy-en-Velay
- Canton: Velay volcanique
- Intercommunality: Pays de Cayres et de Pradelles

Government
  - Mayor (2022–2026): Jean-Claude Vigouroux
- Area^{1}: 37.57 km^{2} (14.51 sq mi)
- Elevation: 980 m (3,220 ft)
- Highest elevation: 1,240 m (4,070 ft)
- Lowest elevation: 689 m (2,260 ft)
- Population (2023): 276
  - Density: 7.35/km^{2} (19.0/sq mi)
- Time zone: UTC+01:00 (CET)
  - Summer (DST): UTC+02:00 (CEST)
- INSEE/Postal code: 43192 /43340
- ^{1} French Land Register data, which excludes lakes, ponds, glaciers > 1 km^{2} (0.386 sq mi or 247 acres) and river estuaries.

Saint-Haon (French pronunciation: [sɛ̃.t‿ɑ̃]; Occitan: Sant Aond) is a commune in the Haute-Loire department in south-central France.

== Population ==
Historical population
Year	Pop.	±% p.a.
1968	751	—
1975	576	−3.72%
1982	488	−2.34%
1990	428	−1.63%
1999	370	−1.60%
2007	375	+0.17%
2012	333	−2.35%
2017	300	−2.07%
2023	276	−1.38%
Source: INSEE

== See also ==
- Communes of the Haute-Loire department
