= Barges, Haute-Loire =

Barges
- Commune
- Location of Barges
- Location within France Location within Auvergne-Rhône-Alpes
- Coordinates: 44°50′13″N 3°53′43″E
- Country: France
- Region: Auvergne-Rhône-Alpes
- Department: Haute-Loire
- Arrondissement: Le Puy-en-Velay
- Canton: Velay volcanique

Government
  - Mayor (2020–2026): Laetitia Hugon-Hilaire
- Area^{1}: 7.02 km^{2} (2.71 sq mi)
- Elevation: 1,080 m (3,540 ft)
- Highest elevation: 1,258 m (4,127 ft)
- Lowest elevation: 945 m (3,100 ft)
- Population (2023): 100
  - Density: 14/km^{2} (37/sq mi)
- Time zone: UTC+01:00 (CET)
  - Summer (DST): UTC+02:00 (CEST)
- INSEE/Postal code: 43019 /43340
- ^{1} French Land Register data, which excludes lakes, ponds, glaciers > 1 km^{2} (0.386 sq mi or 247 acres) and river estuaries.

Barges (French pronunciation: [baʁʒ]; Occitan: Barjas) is a commune in the Haute-Loire department in south-central France.

== Population ==
Historical population
Year	Pop.	±% p.a.
1968	159	—
1975	135	−2.31%
1982	113	−2.51%
1990	105	−0.91%
1999	73	−3.96%
2007	68	−0.88%
2012	75	+1.98%
2017	96	+5.06%
2023	100	+0.68%
Source: INSEE

== See also ==
- Communes of the Haute-Loire department
