= Château de Virieu (Loire) =

Castle in Auvergne-Rhône-Alpes, France

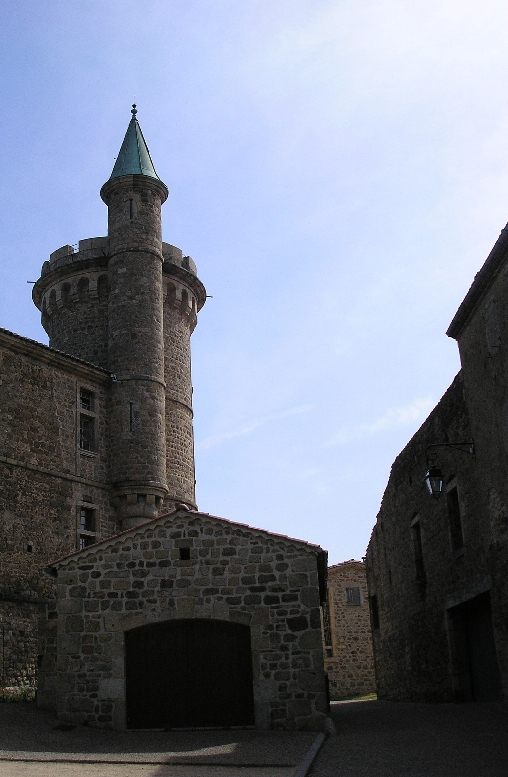

- Location within France

General information
- Coordinates: 45°25′05″N 4°40′13″E

The Château de Virieu is a castle in Pélussin, Loire, Rhône-Alpes, France.

== History ==
It was built in 1633 on the site of a previous castle built as early as 1173.

== Architectural significance ==
It has been listed as an official historical monument by the French Ministry of Culture since 2001.
