= Virieu =

Commune in Isère, France

Virieu Veriô (Arpitan)
- Part of Val-de-Virieu
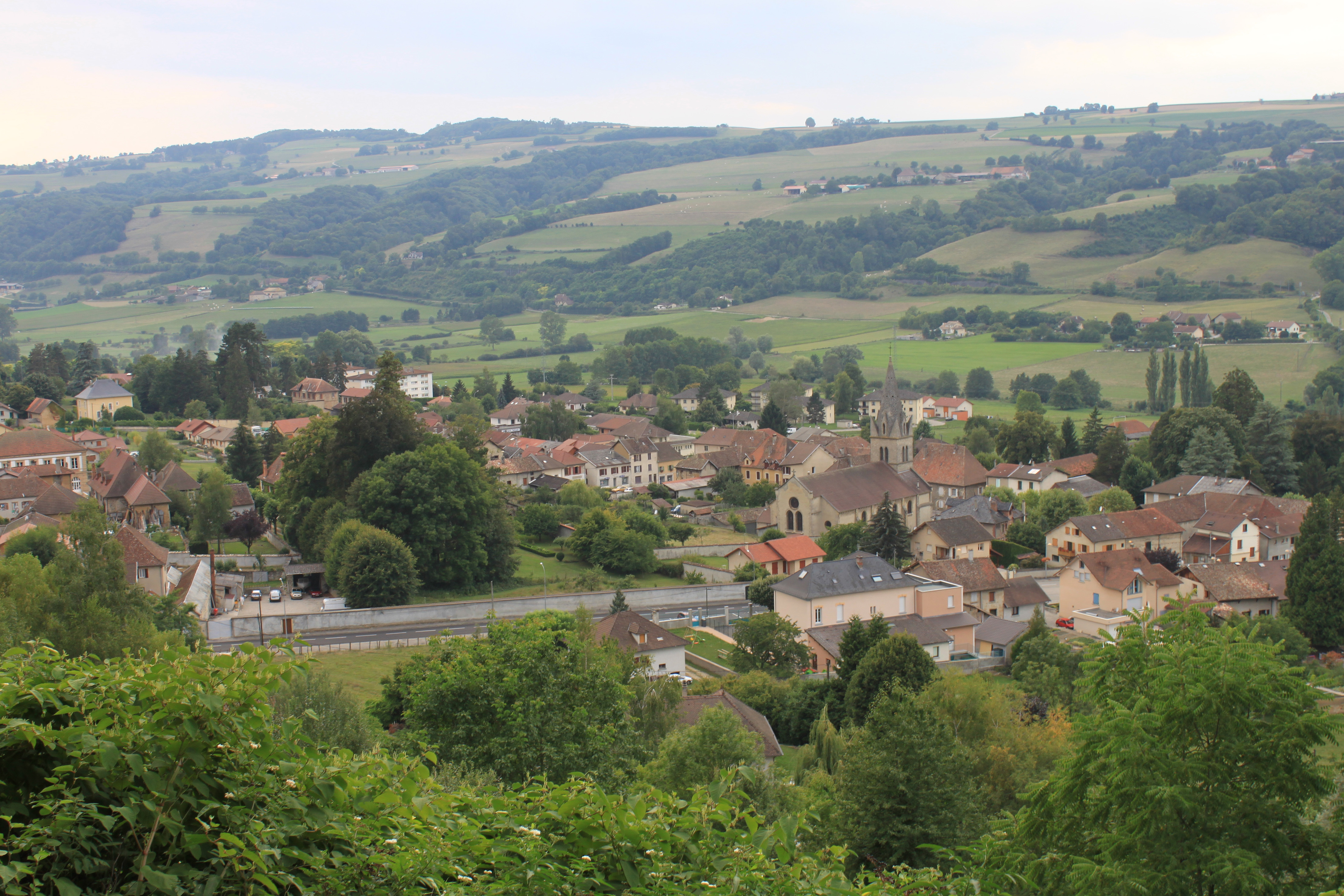
- A general view of Virieu

- Coat of arms
- Location of Virieu
- Location within France Location within Auvergne-Rhône-Alpes
- Coordinates: 45°29′11″N 5°28′34″E
- Country: France
- Region: Auvergne-Rhône-Alpes
- Department: Isère
- Arrondissement: La Tour-du-Pin
- Canton: Le Grand-Lemps
- Commune: Val-de-Virieu
- Area^{1}: 11.38 km^{2} (4.39 sq mi)
- Highest elevation: 775 m (2,543 ft)
- Lowest elevation: 384 m (1,260 ft)
- Population (2018): 1,092
  - Density: 95.96/km^{2} (248.5/sq mi)
- Time zone: UTC+01:00 (CET)
  - Summer (DST): UTC+02:00 (CEST)
- Postal code: 38730
- ^{1} French Land Register data, which excludes lakes, ponds, glaciers > 1 km^{2} (0.386 sq mi or 247 acres) and river estuaries.

Virieu (French pronunciation: [viʁjø]), also Virieu-sur-Bourbre (French pronunciation: [viʁjø syʁ buʁbʁ], literally Virieu on Bourbre; Arpitan: Veriô), is a former commune in the Isère department in southeastern France. On 1 January 2019, it was merged into the new commune Val-de-Virieu.

== Geography ==
The small river Bourbre forms most of the commune's western border.

== Population ==
Historical population

Year	Pop.	±% p.a.
1800	1,076	—
1821	1,174	+0.42%
1846	1,271	+0.32%
1872	1,130	−0.45%
1901	1,057	−0.23%
1926	850	−0.87%
1946	845	−0.03%
1962	716	−1.03%

Year	Pop.	±% p.a.
1968	761	+1.02%
1975	828	+1.21%
1982	950	+1.98%
1990	954	+0.05%
1999	940	−0.16%
2006	973	+0.49%
2018	1,092	+0.97%

Source: EHESS and INSEE

== See also ==
- Communes of the Isère department
