= Cussac-sur-Loire =

- Commune
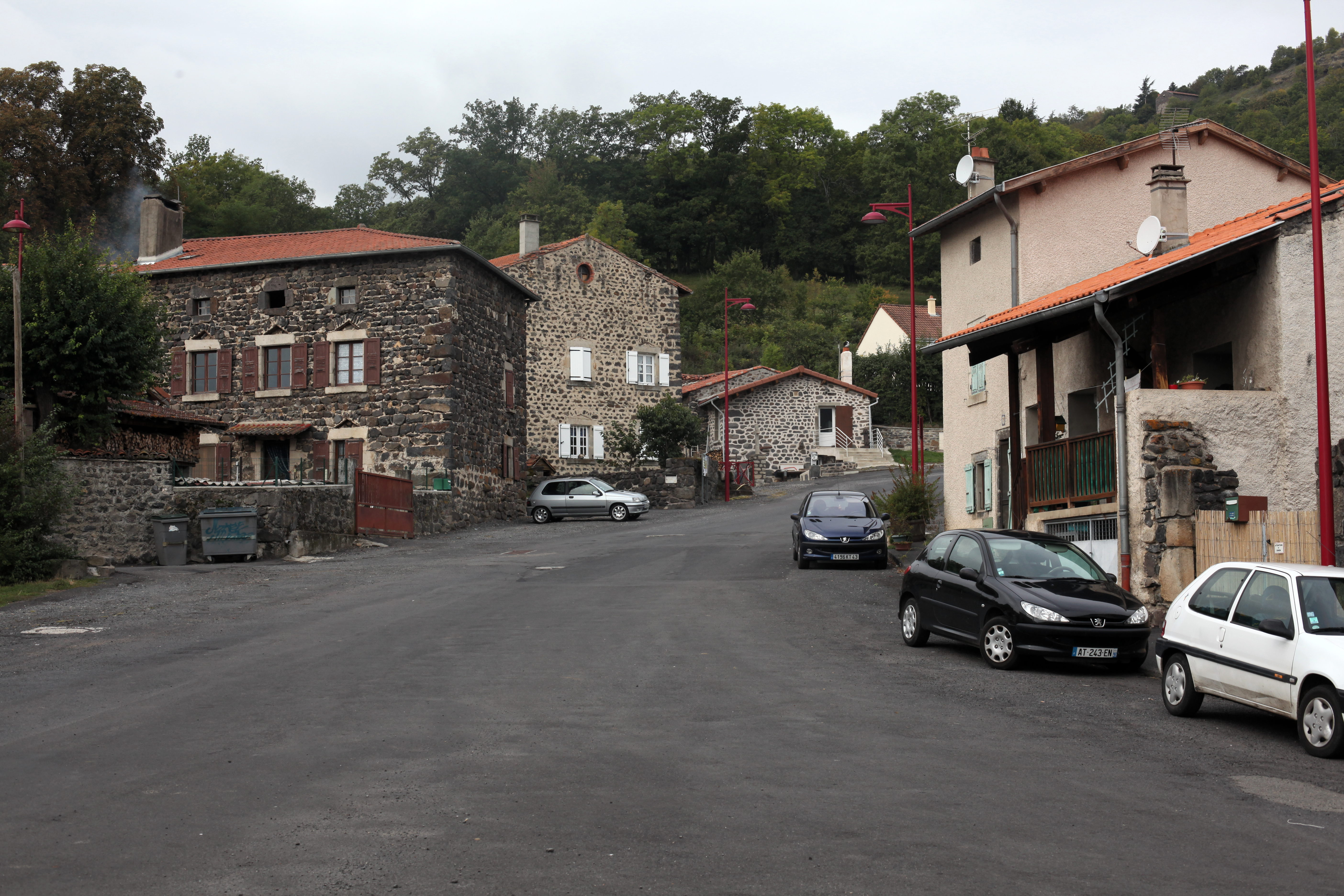
- Location of Cussac-sur-Loire
- Location within France Location within Auvergne-Rhône-Alpes
- Coordinates: 44°59′22″N 3°53′06″E
- Country: France
- Region: Auvergne-Rhône-Alpes
- Department: Haute-Loire
- Arrondissement: Le Puy-en-Velay
- Canton: Velay volcanique
- Intercommunality: CA du Puy-en-Velay

Government
  - Mayor (2020–2026): Rémi Barbe
- Area^{1}: 10.27 km^{2} (3.97 sq mi)
- Elevation: 660 m (2,170 ft)
- Highest elevation: 1,069 m (3,507 ft)
- Lowest elevation: 647 m (2,123 ft)
- Population (2023): 1,653
  - Density: 161.0/km^{2} (416.9/sq mi)
- Time zone: UTC+01:00 (CET)
  - Summer (DST): UTC+02:00 (CEST)
- INSEE/Postal code: 43084 /43370
- ^{1} French Land Register data, which excludes lakes, ponds, glaciers > 1 km^{2} (0.386 sq mi or 247 acres) and river estuaries.

Cussac-sur-Loire (French pronunciation: [kysak syʁ lwaʁ], literally Cussac on Loire; Occitan: Cuçac) is a commune in the Haute-Loire department in south-central France.

== Population ==
Historical population
| Year | Pop. | ±% p.a. |
|---|---|---|
| 1968 | 456 | — |
| 1975 | 686 | +6.01% |
| 1982 | 1,165 | +7.86% |
| 1990 | 1,358 | +1.93% |
| 1999 | 1,376 | +0.15% |
| 2007 | 1,614 | +2.01% |
| 2012 | 1,715 | +1.22% |
| 2017 | 1,710 | −0.06% |
| 2023 | 1,653 | −0.56% |
Source: INSEE

== See also ==
- Communes of the Haute-Loire department
