= List of medieval bridges in France =

The list of medieval bridges in France comprises all known bridges that existed between 500 and 1500 AD in the territory modern-day France, including regions which were not part of the country in the Middle Ages, such as Burgundy, Alsace, Lorraine and Savoie. Most of the bridges were built in the period, but some Roman bridges remained in service throughout the period. There are in total over 700 structures known.

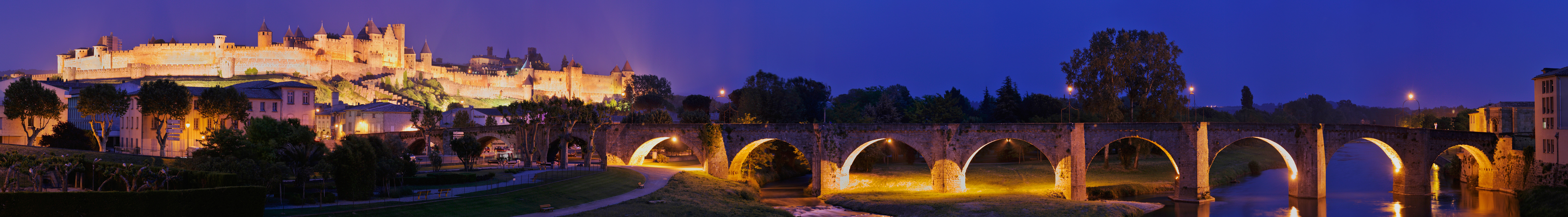
Bridge at Carcassonne (1184), Aude

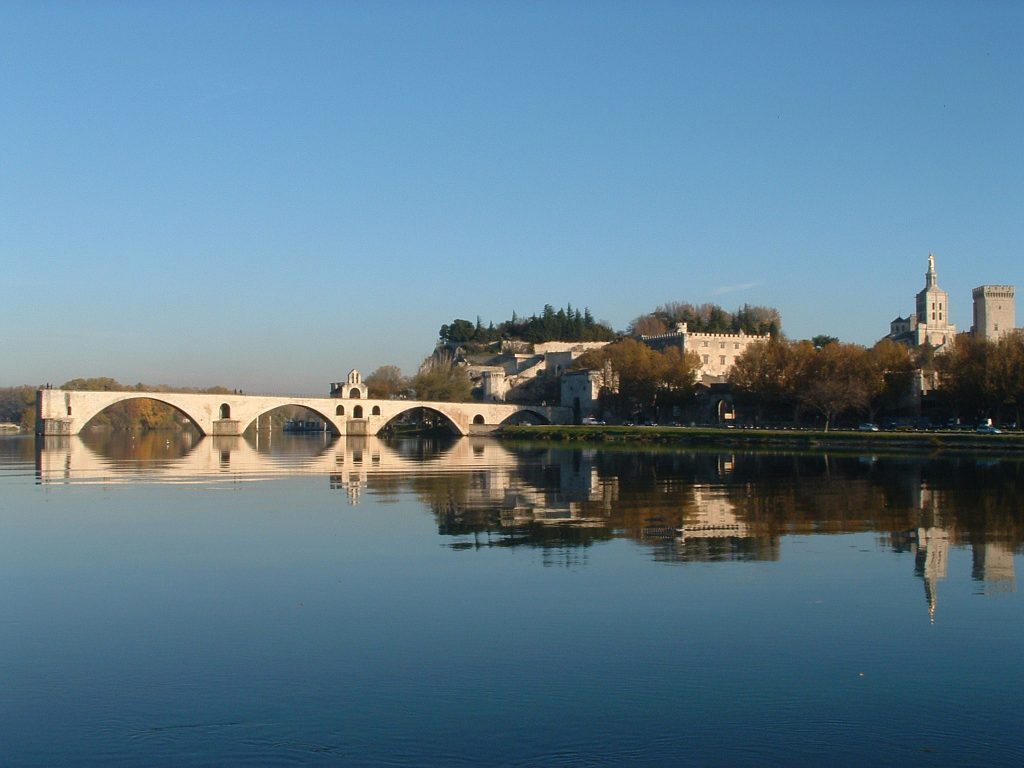
Pont Saint-Bénézet (1177–1188) at Avignon, Vaucluse

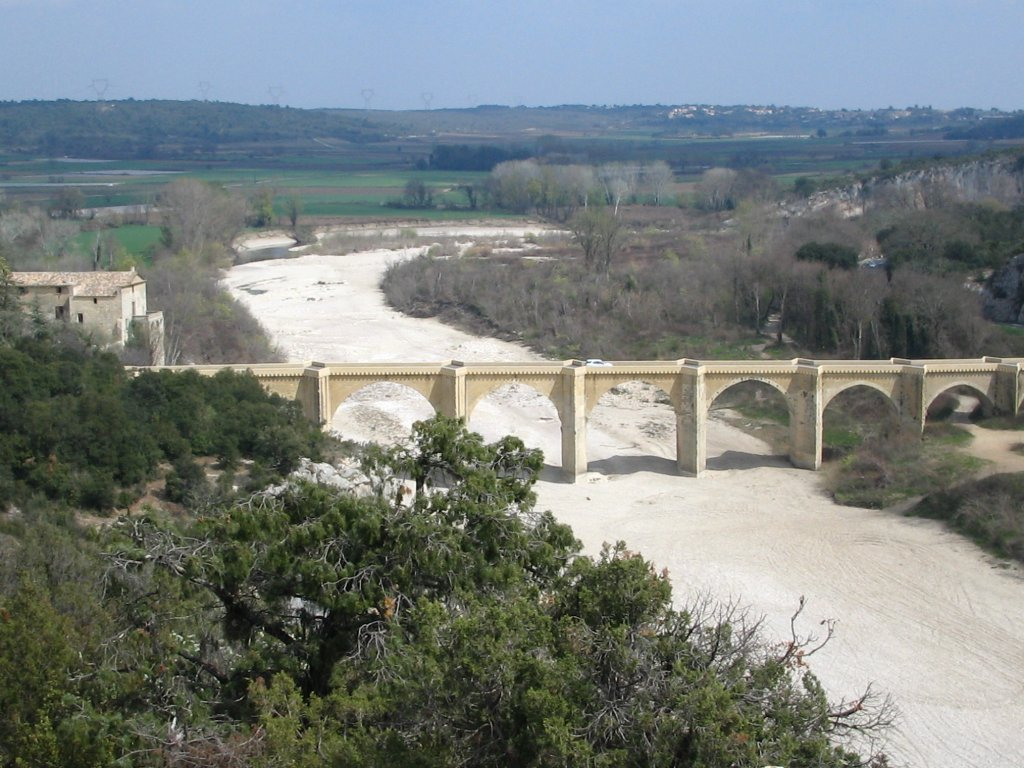
Pont-de-Saint-Nicolas de Campagnac (1261) at Sainte-Anastasie, Gard

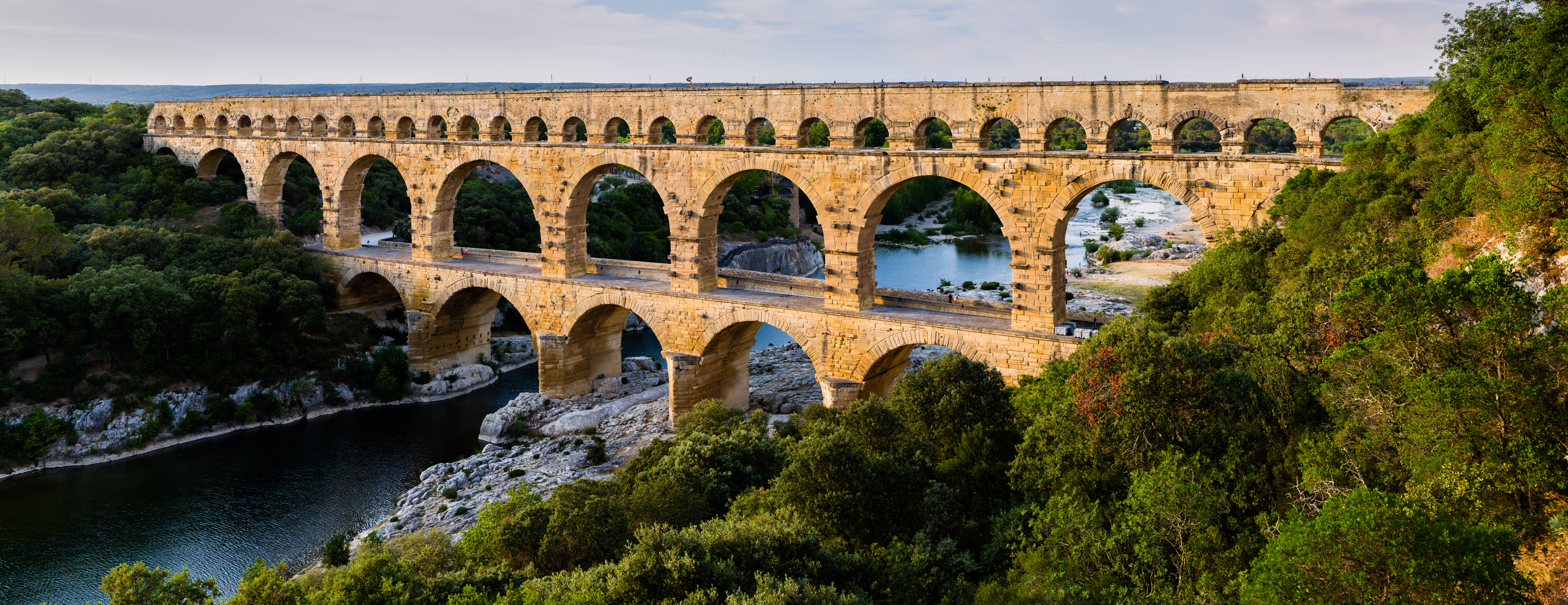
Roman Pont-du-Gard at Remoulins, Gard

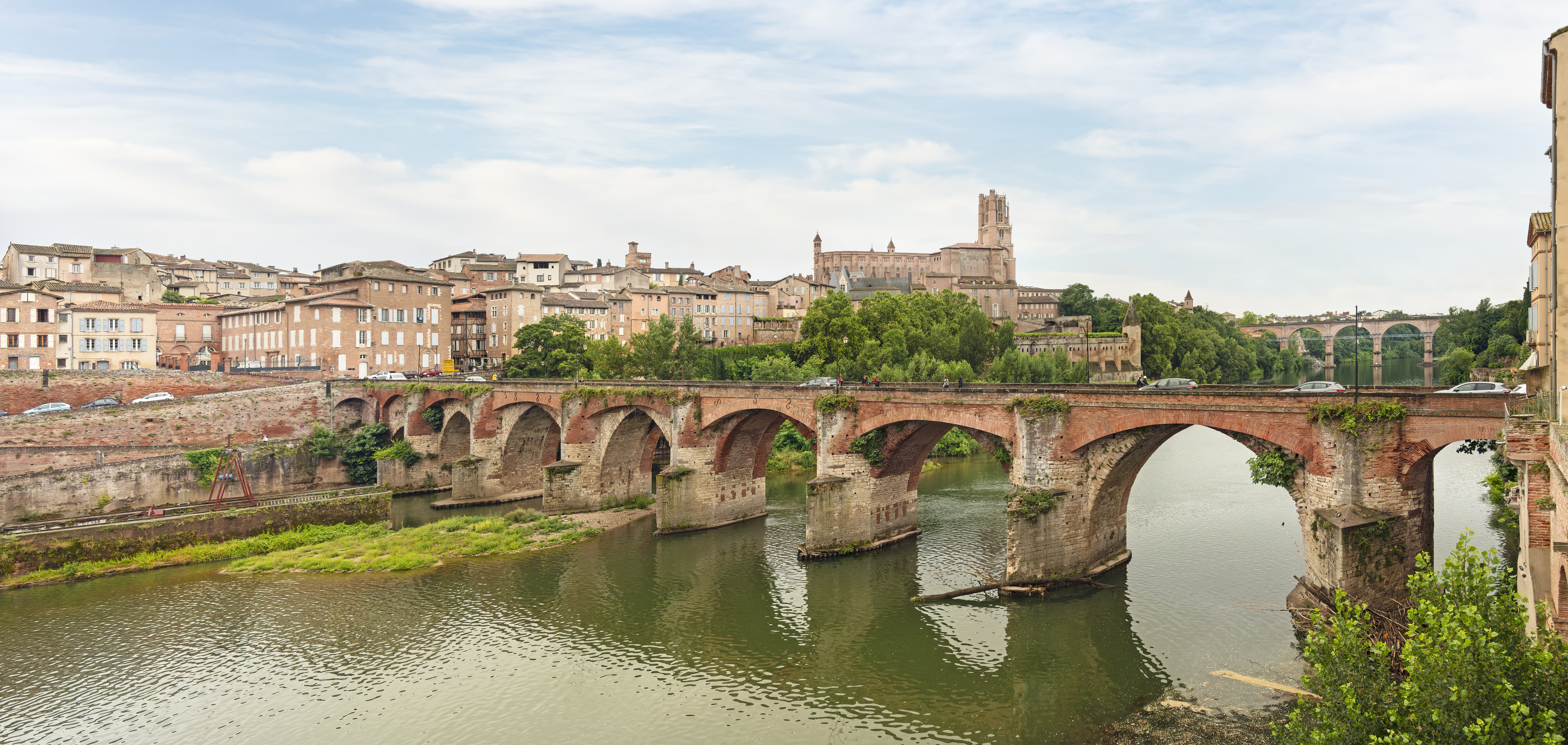
Bridge at Albi (c. 1035), Tarn

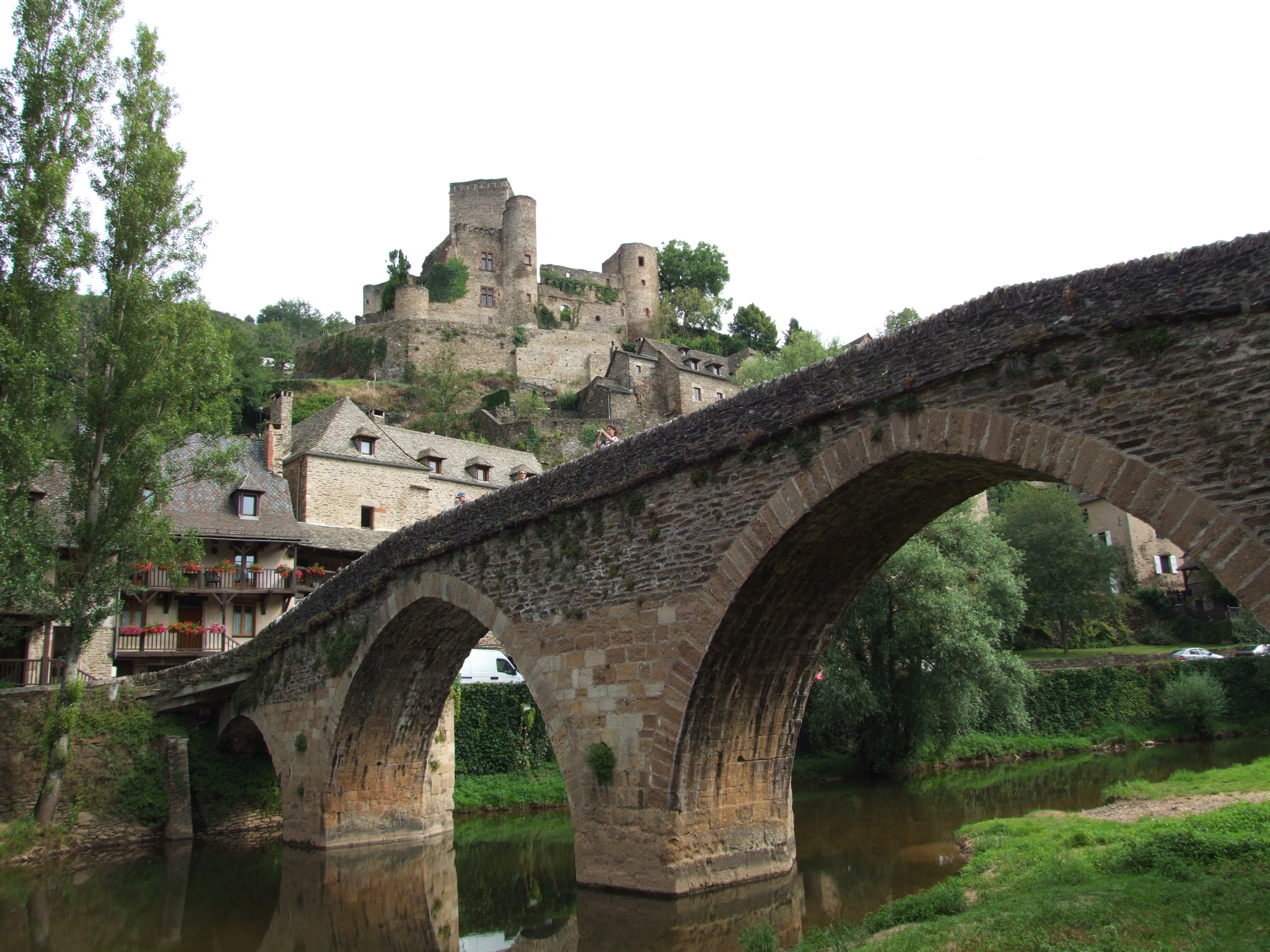
Bridge at Belcastel (15th century), Aveyron

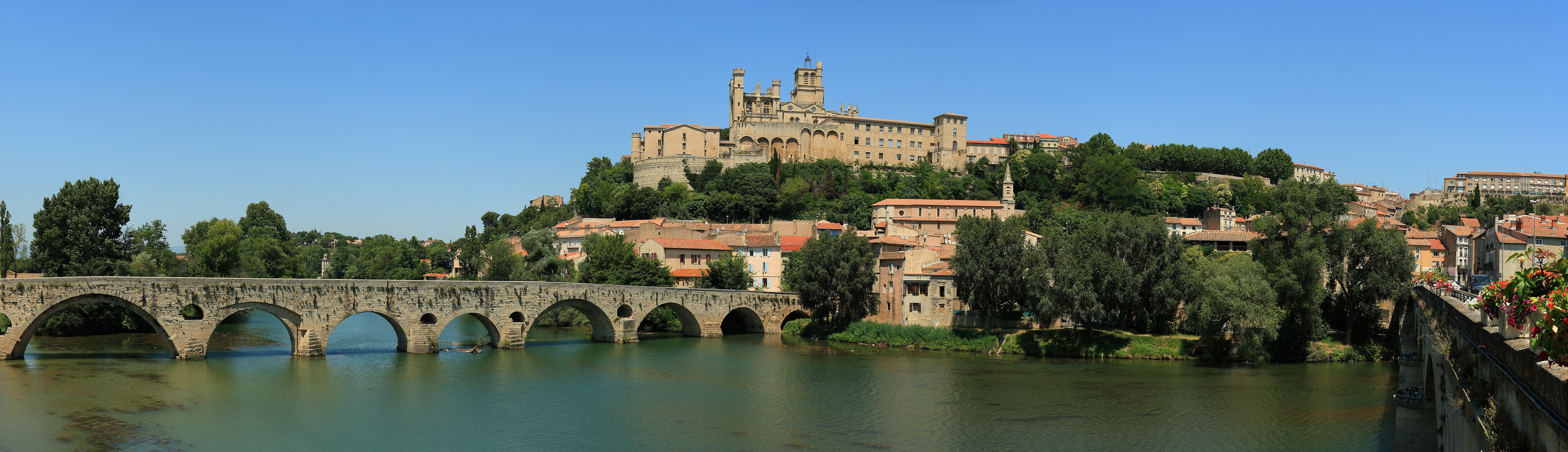
Bridge at Béziers (before 1209), Hérault

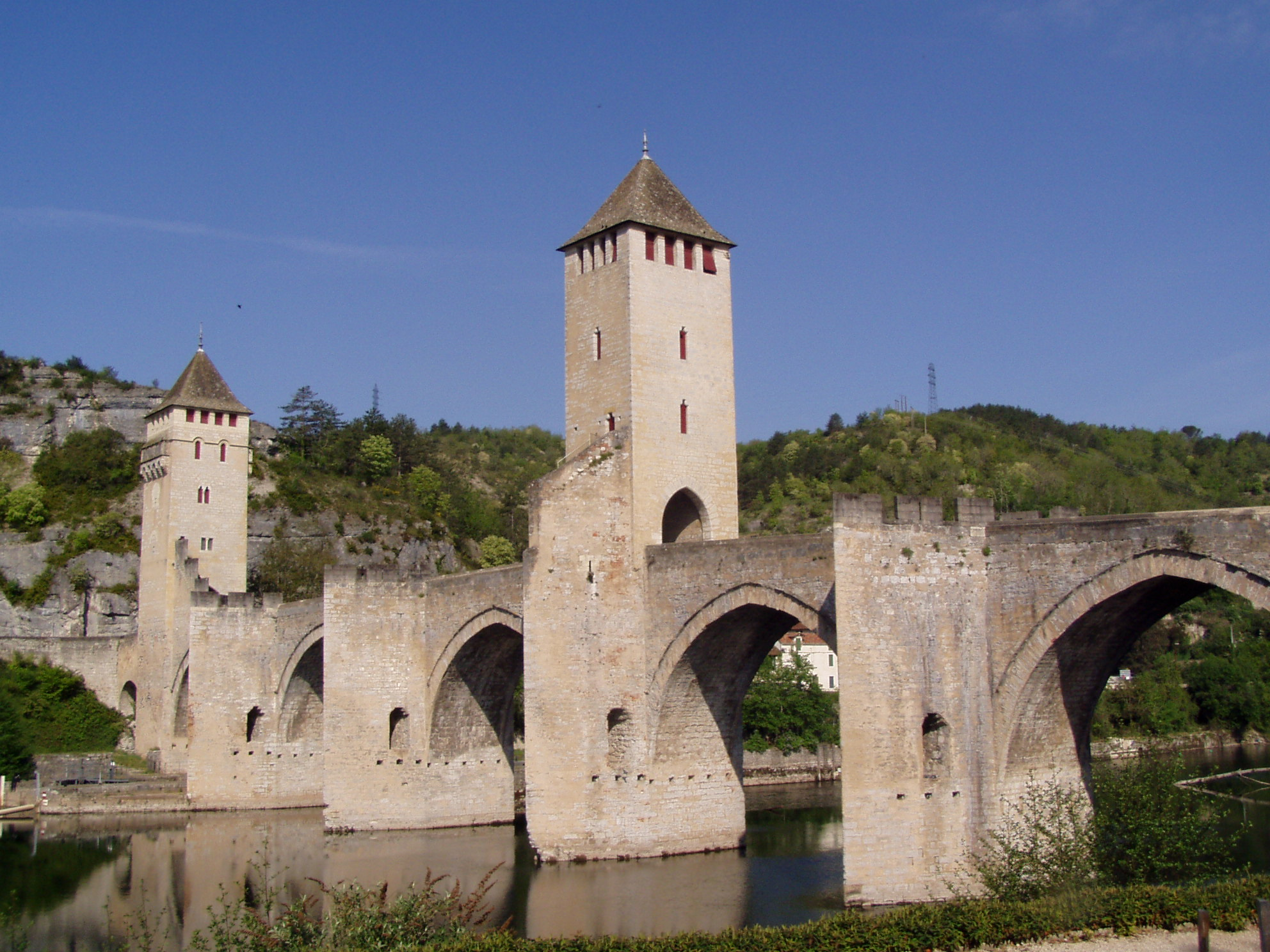
Pont Valentré (1308–c. 1355) at Cahors, Lot

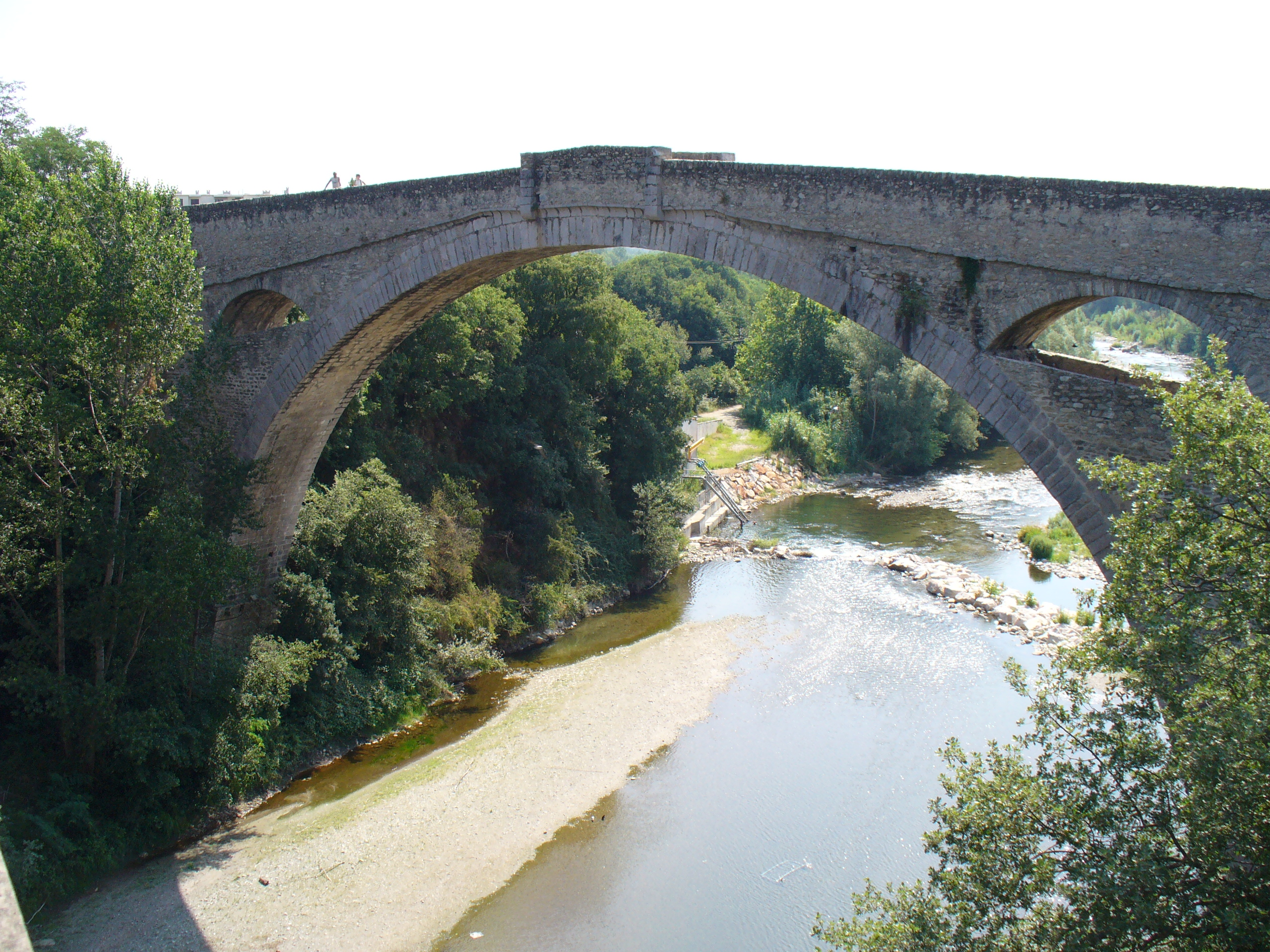
Pont du Diable (1321–1339) at Céret, Pyrénées-Orientales

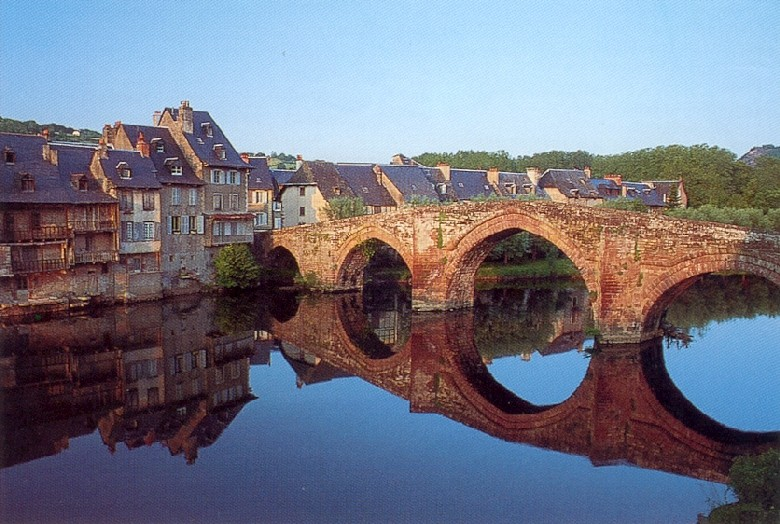
Pont-Vieux at Espalion (1060), Aveyron

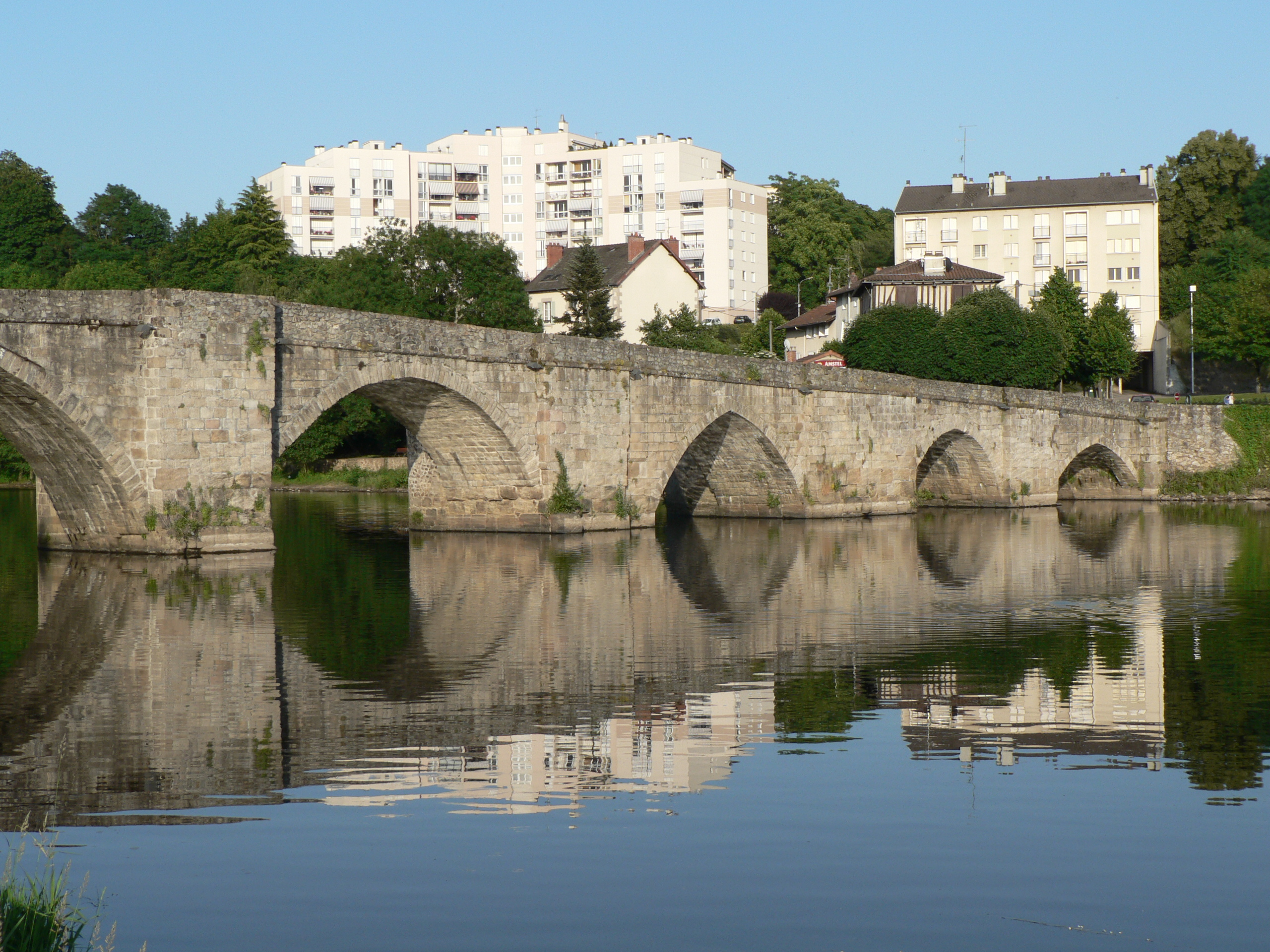
Rebuilt Roman Pont-Saint-Martial (12th century) at Limoges, Haute-Vienne

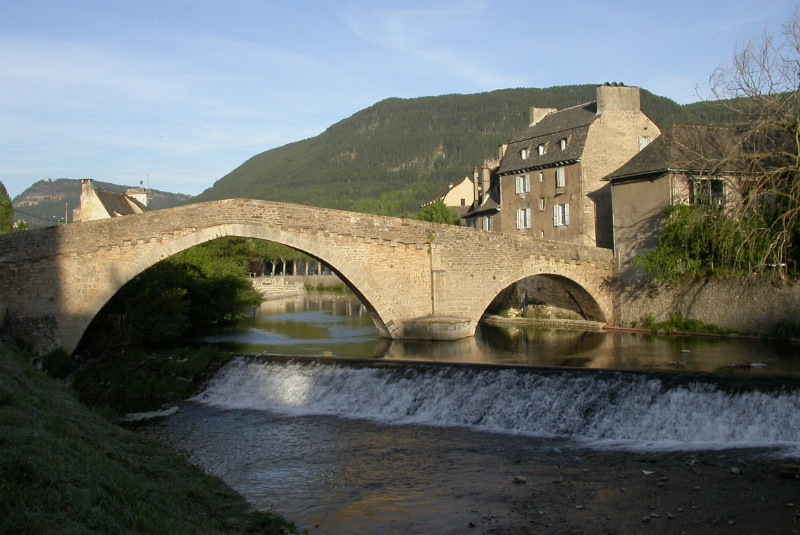
Pont Notre-Dame (14th century) at Mende, Lozère

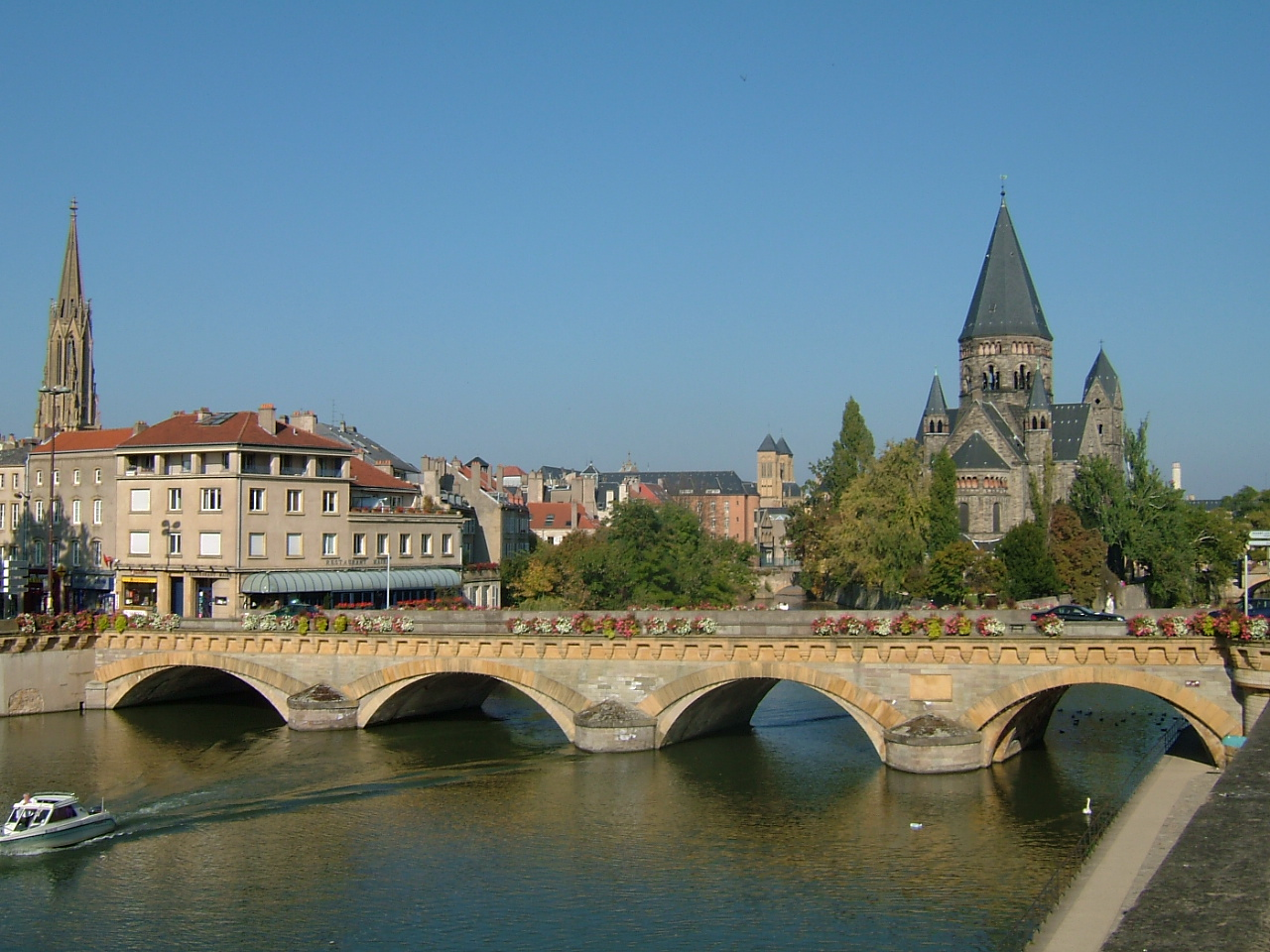
Pont-des-Morts or Moyen Pont (1222–1223) at Metz, Moselle

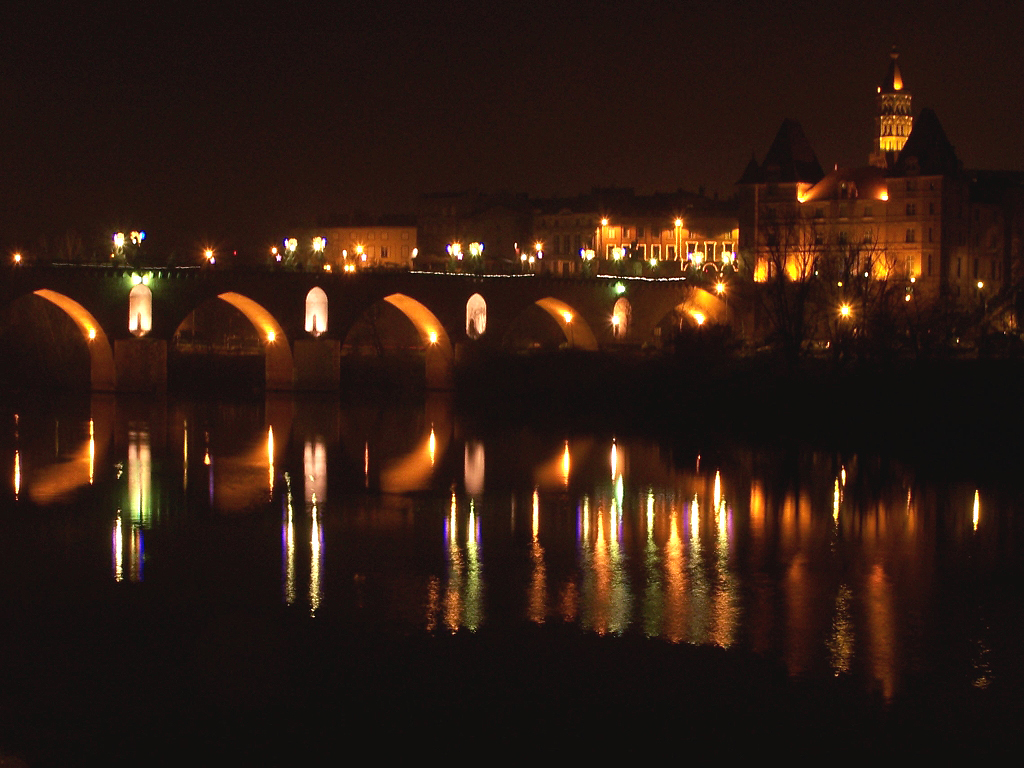
Bridge at Montauban (c. 1336), Tarn-et-Garonne

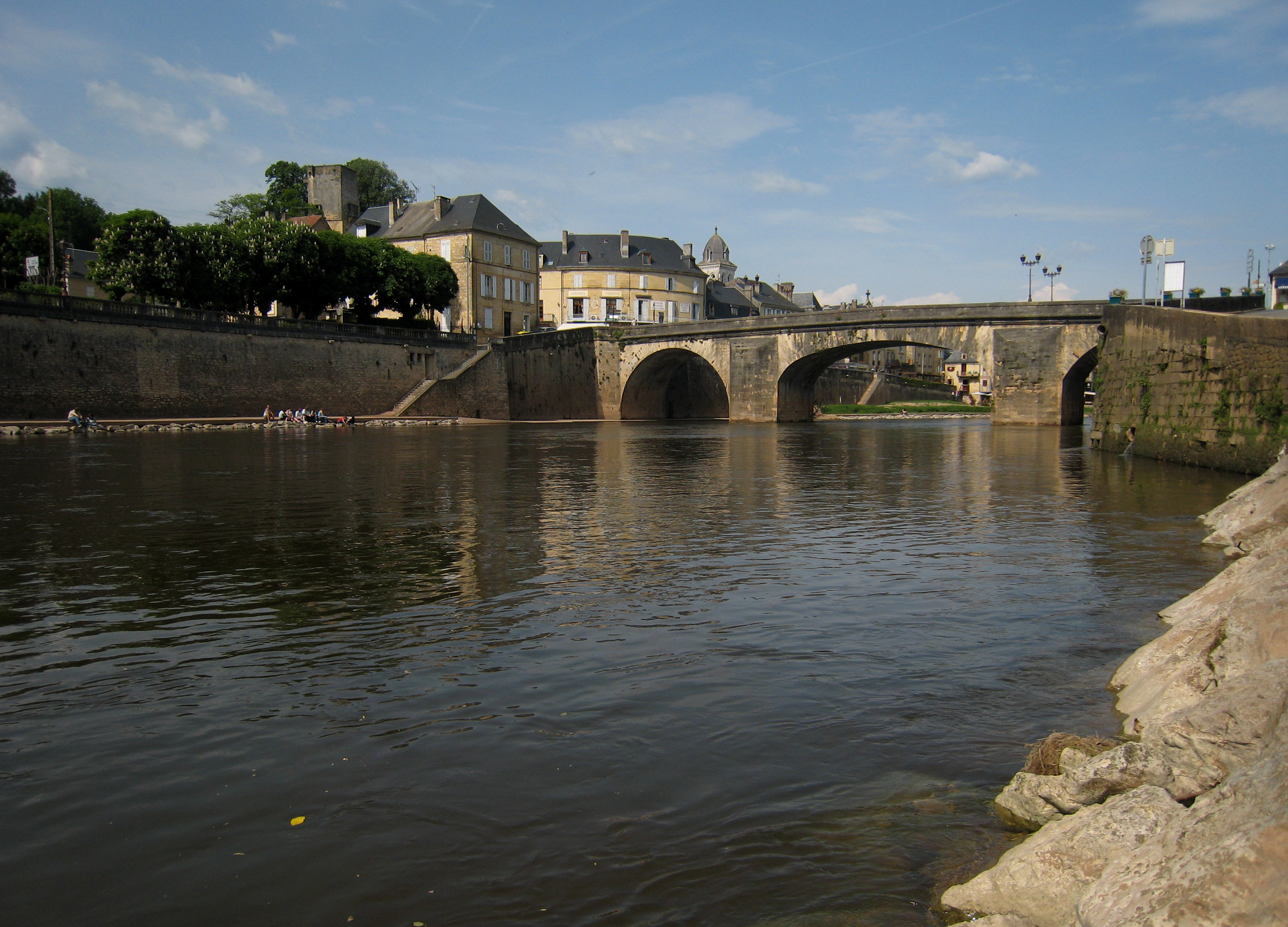
Bridge at Montignac (11th century), Dordogne

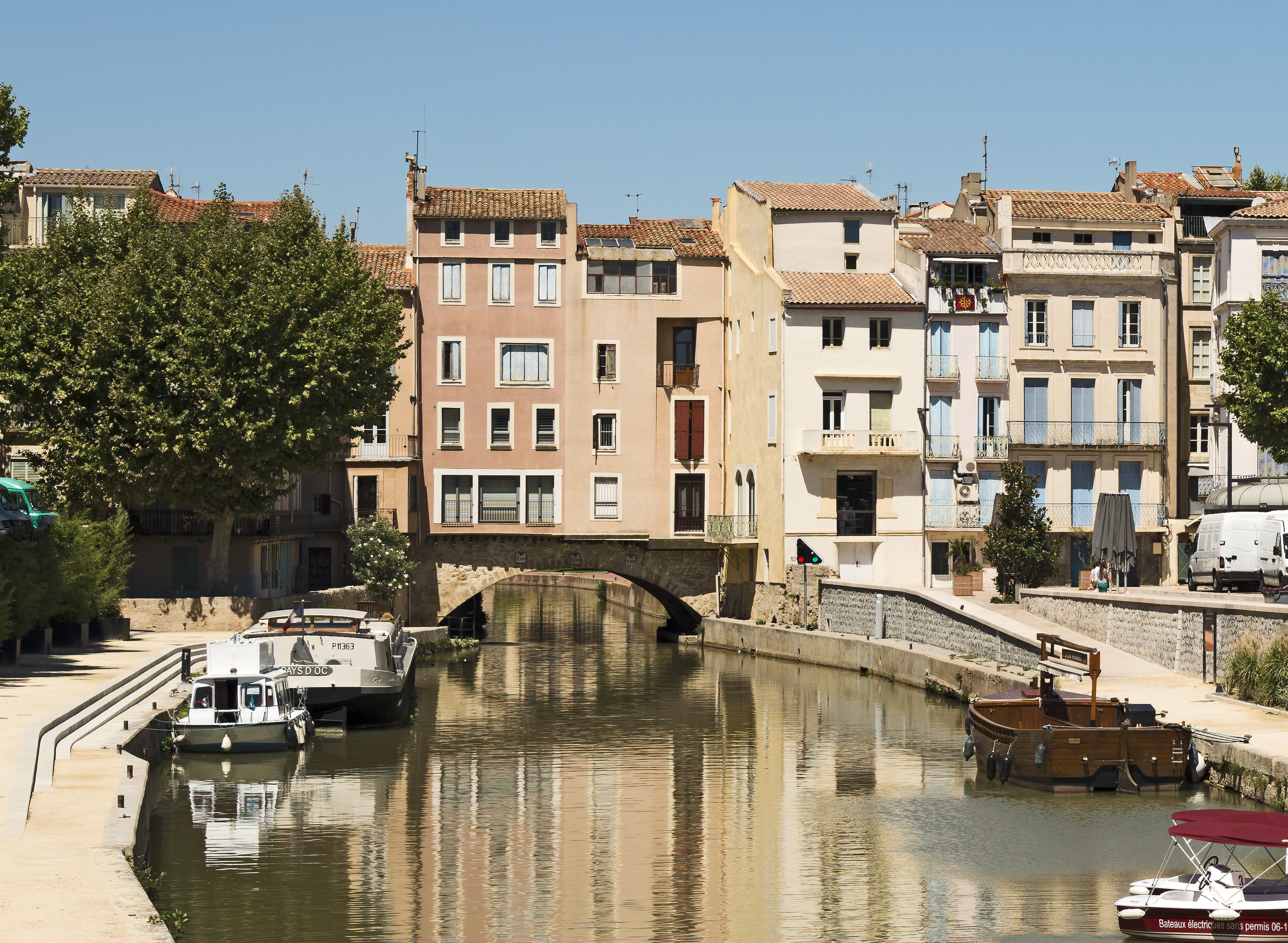
Roman Pont des Marchands at Narbonne, Aude

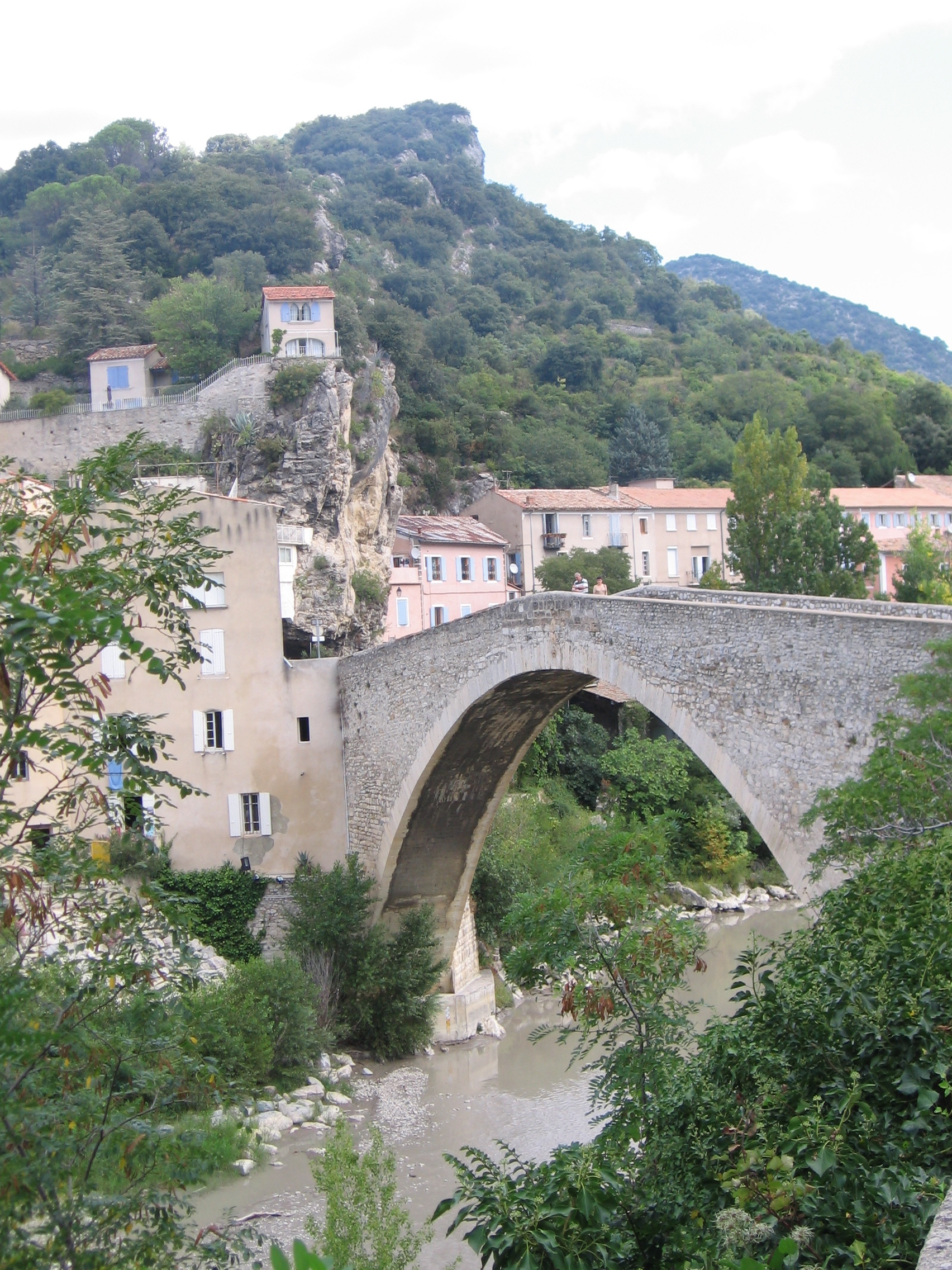
Nyons Bridge (1361) at Nyons, Drôme

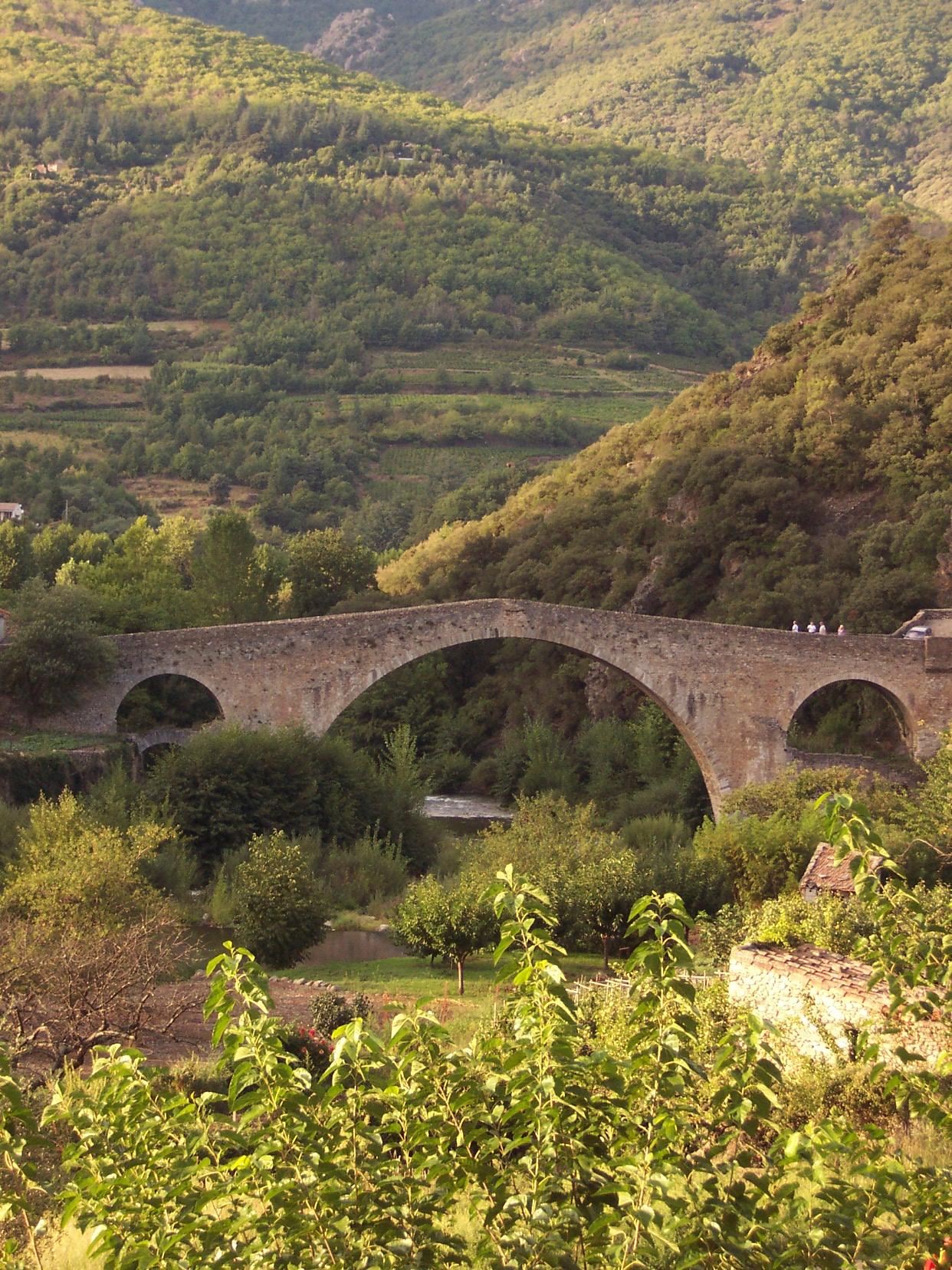
Pont du Diable (12th century) at Olargues, Hérault

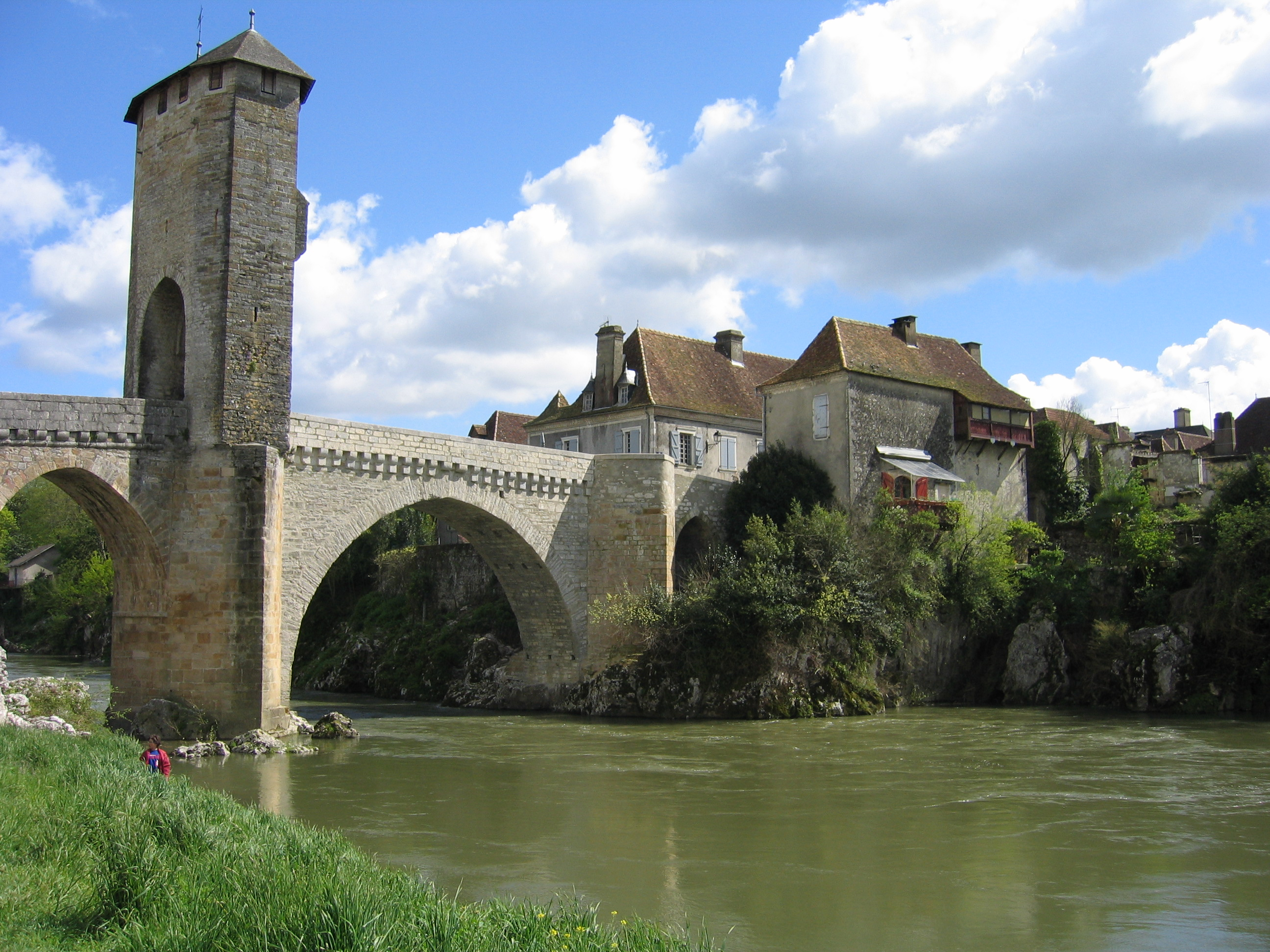
Bridge at Orthez (by 1254), Basses-Pyrénées

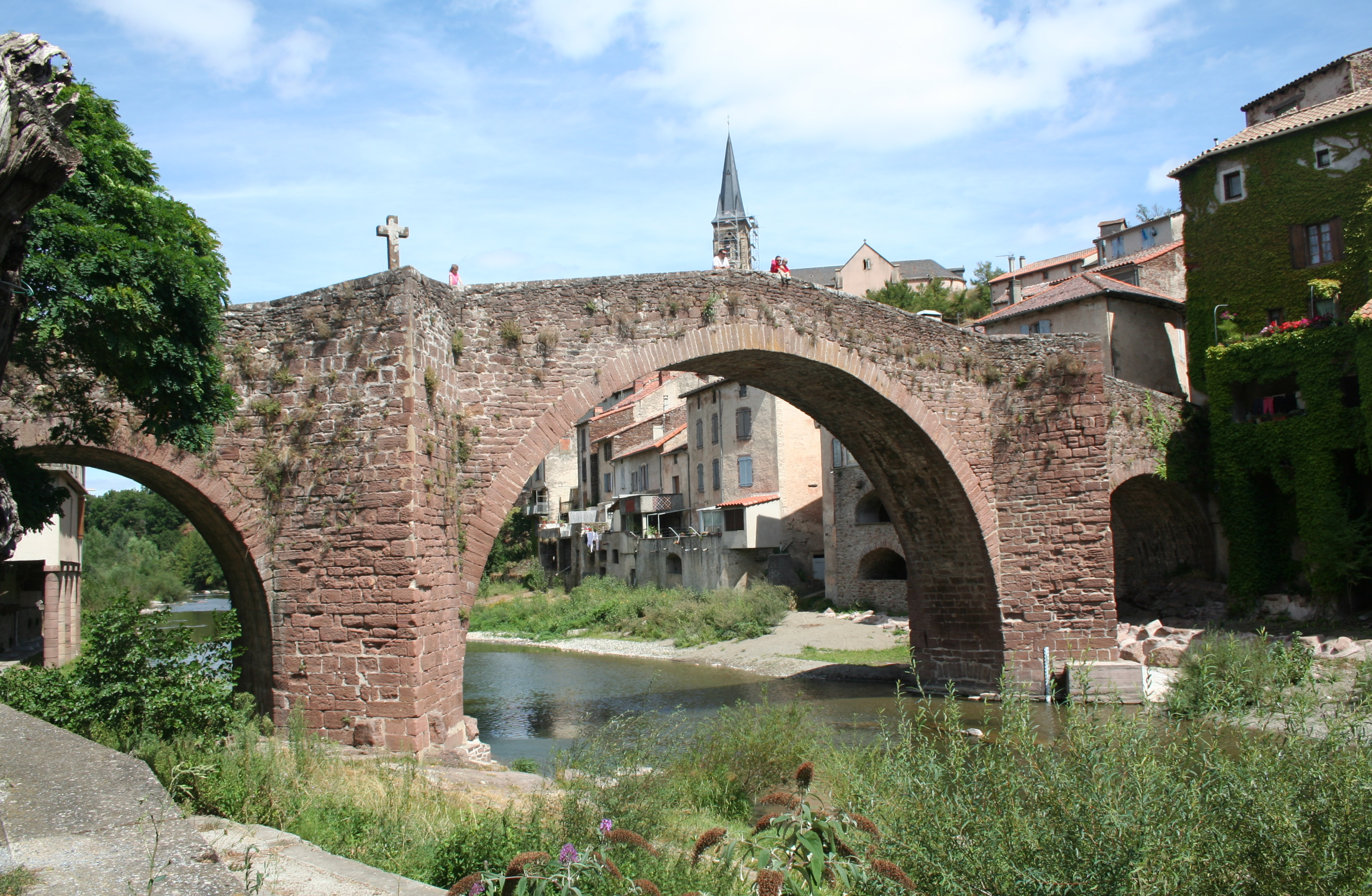
Bridge at Pont-de-Camarès (1311), Aveyron

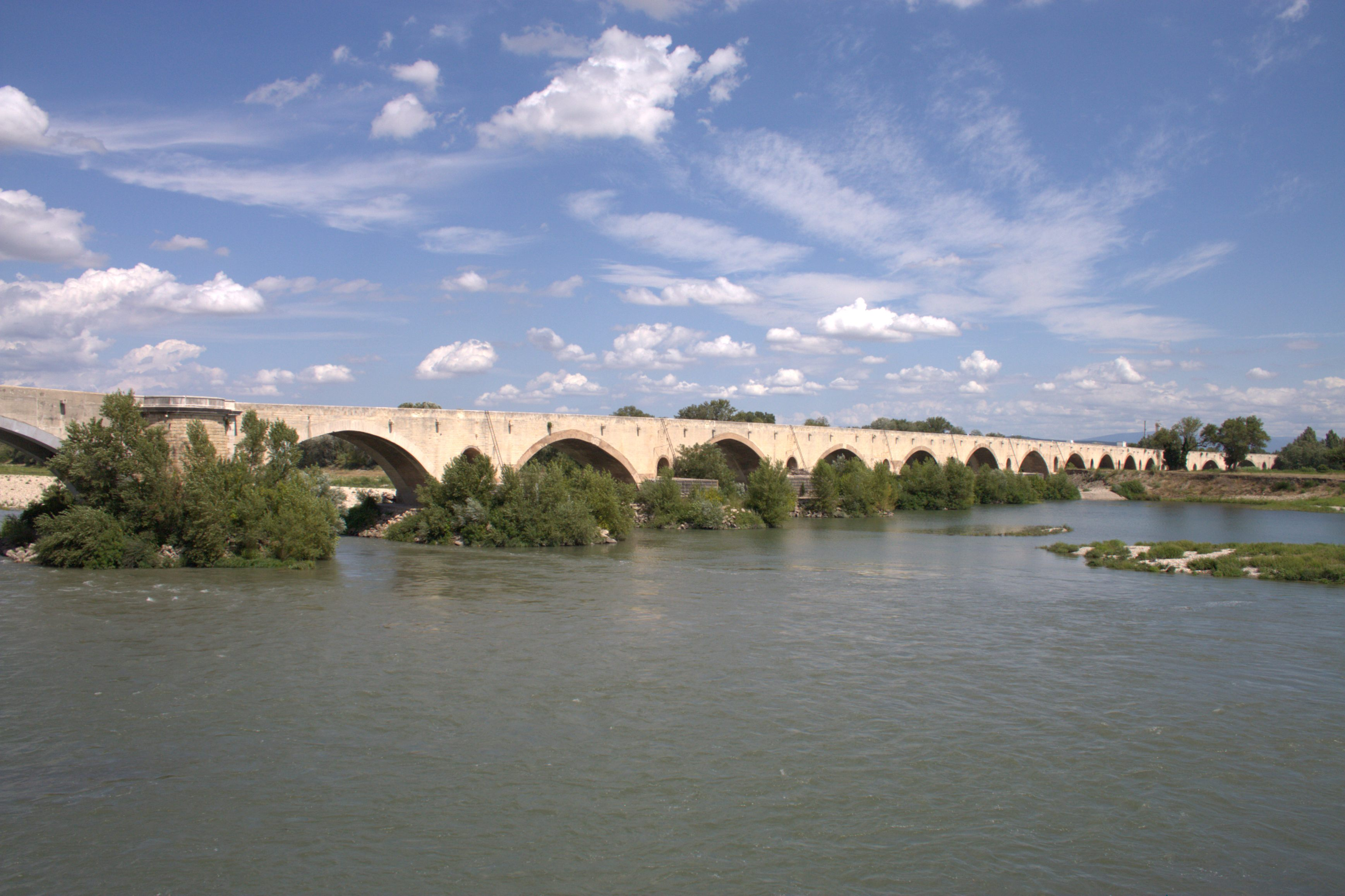
Bridge at Pont-Saint-Esprit (begun 1265), Gard

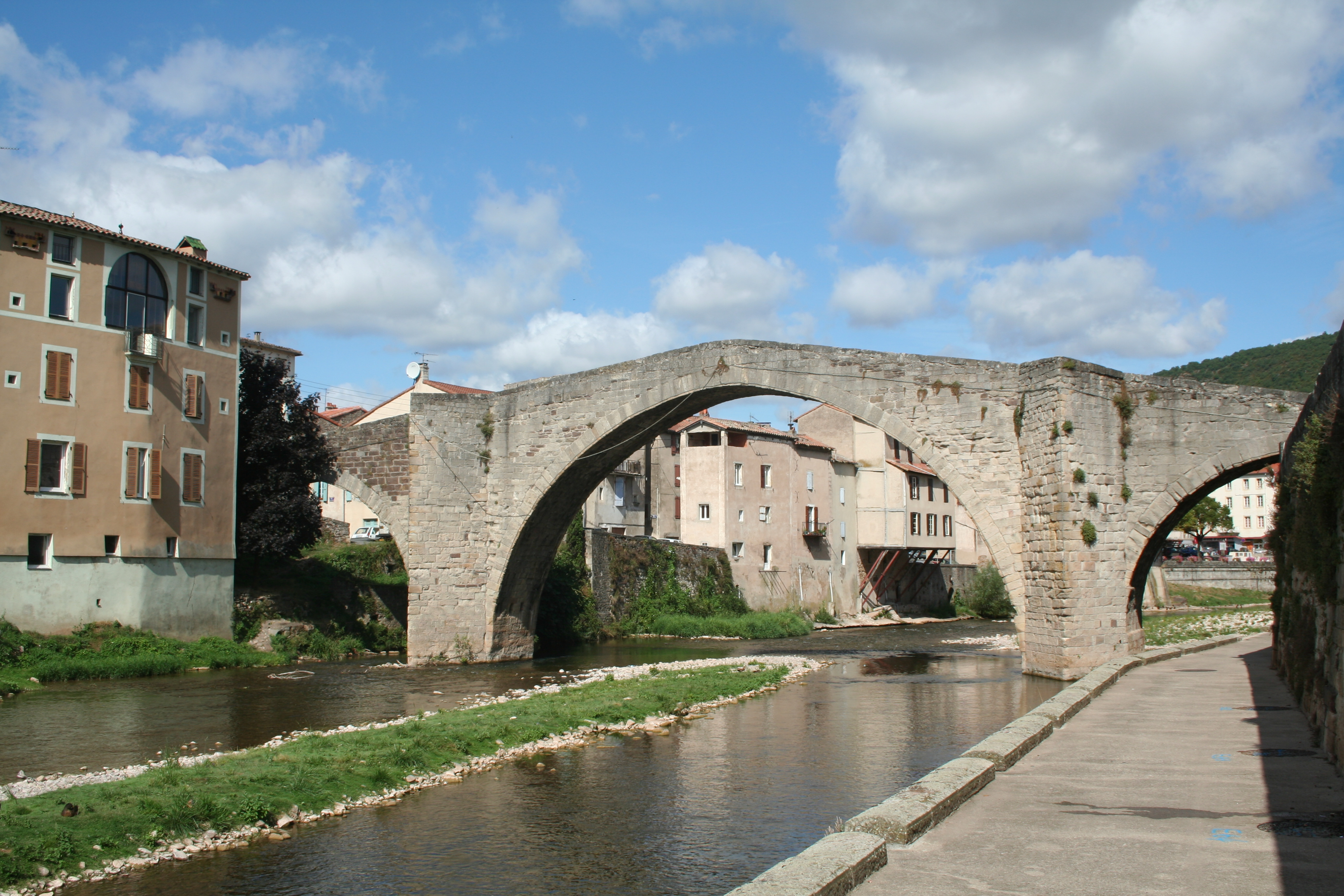
Bridge at Saint-Affrique (before 1368), Aveyron

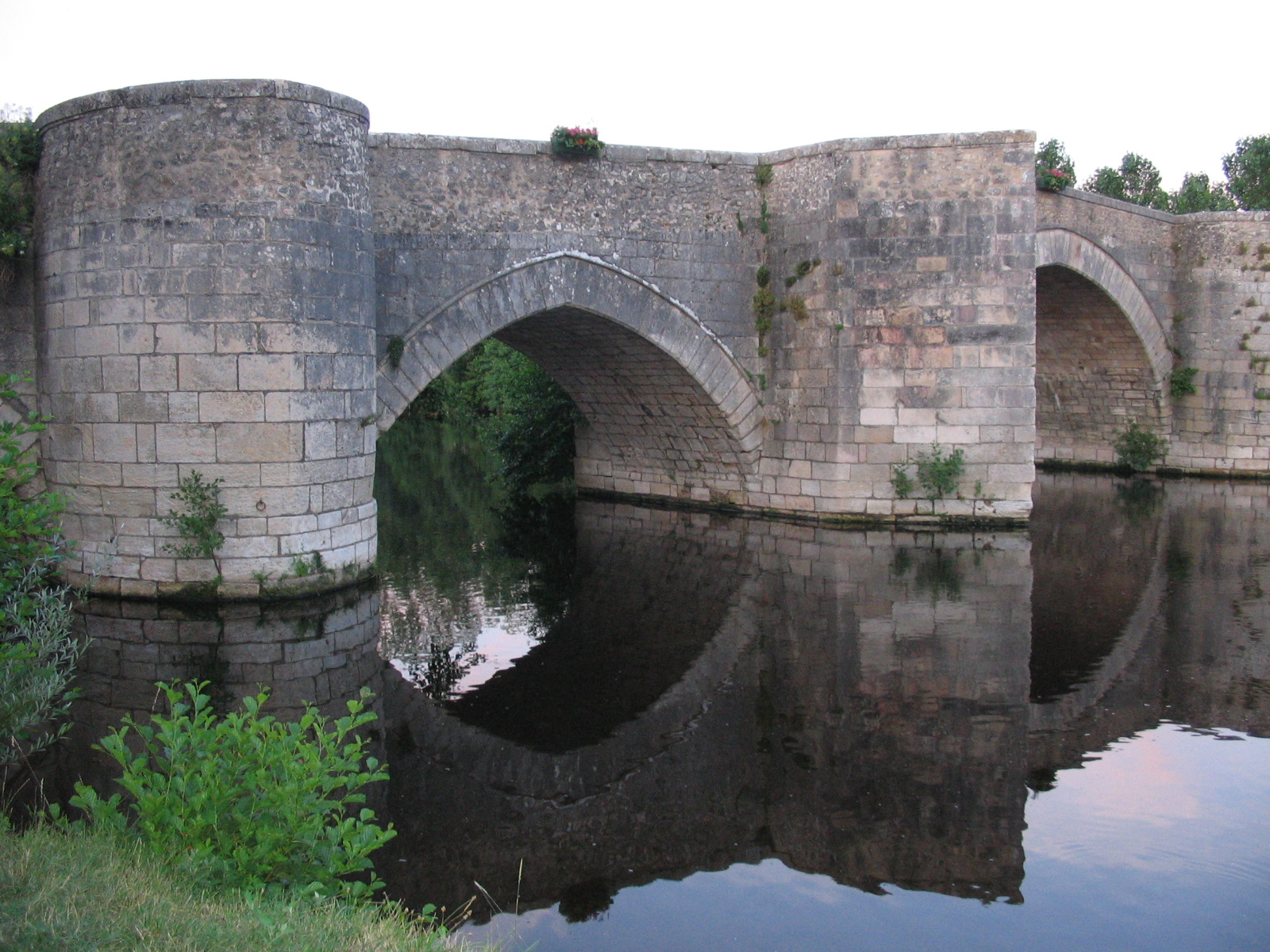
Bridge at Saint-Savin sur Gartempe (possibly 12th or 13th century), Vienne

Location	Department	Comment	First attested
Abbeville	Somme	Pont-aux-Poissons	1207
Agen	Lot-et-Garonne	Fund collection authorized in 1189; passable by end of the 13th century	1189
Airvault	Deux-Sèvres		11th century
Albi	Tarn		c. 1035
Amboise	Indre-et-Loire		1110
Ambrussum	Gard, Hérault	Pont Ambroix, across the Vidourle	Roman
Amiens	Somme	Pont de la Bretesque	1415
Andelys, Les	Eure		1197
Angers	Maine-et-Loire		1028
Angoulême	Charente	Pont Saint-Cybard and Pons Sancti Eporchii	1144–1149
Arc-en-Barrois	Haute-Marne		1157
Arcs-de-Parigny, Les	Vienne		980
Arc-sur-Tille	Côte-d'Or		1124
Arles	Bouches-du-Rhône	Roman bridge of boats after the 1st century, extant in the 4th and 5th centuries, but not in medieval times	Roman
Ars-sur-Moselle	Moselle	Arx; Arcus	881; 889
Art-sur-Meurthe	Meurthe-et-Moselle	Arcus	770
Auboiré	Moselle	See Metz	
Aurillac	Cantal	Pont dal Boys, on the Jordanne	1298
Ausque, near Thérouanne	Pas-de-Calais	Bridge over the Hem	Before 1178
Autun	Saône-et-Loire		Ancient and 1253
Auvers-sur-Oise	Val-d'Oise		Ancient, also 885
Auxance, com. Chasseneuil	Vienne		
Auxerre	Yonne		Ancient and before 1075
Avignon	Vaucluse	Pont-Saint-Bénezet	1177–1188
Balme, La, com. Saint-Paul-d'Izeaux	Isère		14th and 15th centuries
Balme-en-Genevois, La, arr. Annecy	Haute-Savoie		1370
Baudement	Marne	Two bridges	1203
Bayonne	Pyrénées-Atlantiques	Pont Maior	1298
Bayonne	Pyrénées-Atlantiques	Pont de Bertaco	1381
Beaugency	Loiret		Before 1160–1182
Beaumont	Yonne		Before 1185
Beaumont-sur-Oise	Val-d'Oise		1143–1145
Beaumont-sur-Sarthe	Sarthe		12th century
Beauvais	Oise		Before 1122
Belcastel	Aveyron		15th century
Bergerac	Dordogne		1209
Besançon	Doubs		Ancient and medieval
Béziers	Hérault		Before 1209
Bigaroque	Dordogne		1243
Blanzy	Saône-et-Loire		1305
Blau	Aude		1259
Blois	Loir-et-Cher		Before 1078
Bognens, Le pont de, com. Andert-et-Condon	Ain		1290
Boisseron	Hérault		Roman
Bonevi, near Lorrez-le-Bocage	Seine-et-Marne		1202
Bonpas	Vaucluse		1166
Bordeaux	Gironde		1292
Boudelin, com. Fontaine	Aube		1231
Bourges	Cher	Bridge to vineyard	1095
Bouveruel, in bailliage of Rouen	Seine-Maritime		1334
Bouxières-aux-Dames, cant. Nancy-Est	Meurthe		1073
Brantôme	Dordogne	Pont du Monastère	1474
Breuilpont	Eure		1336
Bréval	Yvelines	Bridges rebuilt in provost's district	1202
Brèves	Nièvre	On the Yonne	Gallo-Roman
Brezolles	Eure-et-Loir	Pontchartrain in Brezolles on the Nouvette	Gallo-Roman
Briare	Loiret	On the Loire	Gallo-Roman
Brières	Ardennes		Gallo-Roman
Brieulles-sur-Bar	Ardennes		Gallo-Roman
Brieulles-sur-Meuse	Meuse	Called Briodurum in 11th-12th centuries	11th century
Brimeux	Pas-de-Calais		1292
Brioude	Haute-Loire		Gallo-Roman
Brioux	Deux-Sèvres		Gallo-Roman
Briovera, later Saint-Lô	Manche		Gallo-Roman
Brissac	Maine-et-Loire		After 1162
Brissarthe	Maine-et-Loire		Gallo-Roman
Brives	Indre		Gallo-Roman
Brives	Mayenne		Gallo-Roman
Brives-la-Gaillarde	Corrèze		Gallo-Roman; 6th century
Brives-sur-Charente	Charente-Maritime		Gallo-Roman
Brivodura	Yonne	See Pontaubert	
Brivodurum	Eure	See Pont-Audemer	
Bugue, Le	Dordogne	On the Vézère	1463
Cahors	Lot	Pont Neuf; Pont Valentre	Roman; 1251; 1308–c. 1355
Cajarc	Lot		1222
Calais	Pas-de-Calais		1390
Campagnac, com. Sainte-Anastasie	Gard	Pont-de-Saint-Nicolas de Campagnac	1261
Carbonne	Haute-Garonne	Rebuilding	1356
Carcassonne	Aude		1184
Castres	Tarn	Repairs of Pont Bielh and Pont de Navès	1391
Céret	Pyrénées-Orientales	Pont du Diable	1321–1339
Chabris	Indre		Gallo-Roman
Chalonnes-sur-Loire	Maine-et-Loire		1138–1148
Châlons-sur-Marne	Marne		1164
Chalon-sur-Saône	Saône-et-Loire	Roman bridge of timber on stone piers; Pont Saint-Vincent built of stone 1415 on ancient piers	Roman, 1415
Charenton	Val-de-Marne		Gallo-Roman and 7th century
Charité-sur-Loire, La	Nièvre		1482
Chartres	Eure-et-Loir	Pont de Falaise in the parish of Saint-Prest	1374–1454
Chartroussas, cant. Guignan, com. Roussac	Drôme		1334
Château-Gaillard	Eure	See Andelys, Les	
Château-Gontier	Mayenne		1080
Châteauneuf-de-Mazenc, cant. Dieulefit	Drôme		1462
Châteauneuf-sur-Sarthe	Maine-et-Loire		1136–1138
Château-Thierry	Aisne		1287
Châtellerault	Vienne		c. 1060
Chaudefonds-sur-Layon	Maine-et-Loire		1451
Chauvigny	Vienne		c. 1080
Cheney, cant. Seignelay	Yonne		Before 1185
Chérisy, near Argenteuil	Seine-et-Oise		1266
Chinon	Indre-et-Loire		1115–1126
Chocques	Pas-de-Calais	Castle bridge	1170–1191
Choisy-au-Bac	Oise		1248
Claix	Isère	See Grenoble	
Clamecy	Nièvre		1147
Coëmont, cant. Château-du-Loir, arr. Mans	Sarthe		11th century
Comines	Nord		2nd half 14th century
Compiègne	Oise		c. 876; also 1112
Comporté, communes Saint-Macoux and Saint-Saviol	Vienne	Pont de Compourte	1432
Condom	Gers	Rebuilt	1281
Conflans	Savoie	Pont de Conflans, on the Arly	Peutinger Table
Confolens	Charente	On the Vienne	c. 1110–1140
Conques	Aude	Pont de Vilar	1083
Corbeil	Seine-et-Oise		1301
Cornil	Corrèze		1103
Corre, La, com. Champ-sur-Barse	Aube		1215
Couilly	Seine-et-Marne	See Pont-aux-Dames	
Coulanges-sur-Yonne	Yonne		12th and 13th centuries
Coutances	Manche	Over the Vire	1024–1093
Cravant	Yonne		1368
Creil	Oise		1415
Cuisery	Saône-et-Loire	On the Seille	1350
Decize	Nièvre		1225
Dijon	Côte-d'Or	Pont Arnault; wooden bridge on the Ouche	1395–1396
Donchery	Ardennes		1322
Dormans	Marne		1258–1259
Douve, com. Carentan	Manche		1346
Durtal	Maine-et-Loire		11th century
Entraygues	Aveyron	Pont Notre-Dame, on the Lot; Bridge on the Truyère	1269 perhaps 14th century
Escautpont	Nord	Pons Scaldis; Scalpons	Peutinger Table; 921
Espalion	Aveyron	Pont-Vieux	1060
Estaing, com. Monastier	Haute-Loire		1329
Étampes	Seine-et-Oise		1060–1108
Évreux	Eure	Pont Saint	1245
Fénétrange	Meurthe	Pons Saravi	Peutinger Table
Ferté-Milon, La	Aisne		1349
Figeac	Lot		1291
Flogny, arr. Tonnerre	Yonne		1224
Florent	Marne	Pont-de-Rêmes	Gallo-Roman
Fontaine-Daniel, abbey, com. Saint-Georges-Buttavent	Mayenne	Bridge over the Mayenne; Pont-David	1209; 1231
Fontaine-le-Port	Seine-et-Marne		1204–1205
Fouchères	Aube		1220
Frégère	Aveyron	See Najac	
Gaillac	Tarn		1256
	Gers	Two bridges over the Gers	c. 1060
Gien	Loiret		1458
Gières	Isère	Pont de Gières	14th century
Gisors	Eure		1184
Goncelin, between communes of Goncelin and Le Touvet	Isère	Pont de Goncelin, on the Isère	1270
Gournay-sur-Marne	Seine-et-Oise		1147
Grenade	Haute-Garonne		1309
Grenoble	Isère	Pont du Drac, near Claix; Pont-Saint-Jaymes; Pont de Porte-Traine	1219; 14th century 1378–1379
Grignan	Drôme	On the road to Grillon (Vaucluse)	1436
L'Île-Bouchard	Indre-et-Loire	Pont de Saint-Gilles to L'Île-Bouchard in the Vienne reconstructed at that date	1451
L'Isle-Adam	Seine-et-Oise		1415
Isle-de-Pons, L', com. Ligugé	Vienne	On the Clain	1420
Isle-en-Périgord	Dordogne	See Lisle	
Jargeau	Loiret		13th century
Jarrie	Isère	A bridge at this point briefly about 1310, then a ferry again	c. 1310
Joigny	Yonne	In existence from that time	13th century
Jouars-Pontchartrain	Seine-et-Oise		Gallo-Roman
Juvardeil	Maine-et-Loire		1075
Juvisy, cant. Longjumeau, arr. Corbeil	Seine-et-Oise		13th century
Lagny	Seine-et-Marne	Destroyed at that date	1432
Lalinde	Dordogne	Toll for bridges	1289
Laval	Mayenne		1170
Lectoure	Gers		1485
Lézigny, com. Mailly-la-Ville	Yonne		1241
Limoges	Haute-Vienne	Pont-Saint-Martial, rebuilt Roman bridge Pont-Saint-Étienne; both in use in the 12th century	Roman; 12th century
Limoux	Aude		1318
Lisle	Dordogne	Isle-en-Périgord	1309
Livron-sur-Drôme	Drôme		1471
Longpont	Aisne		1118
Lorrez-le-Bocage	Seine-et-Marne	See Bonevi	
Lorris	Loiret		1292
Louviers	Eure		c. 1027
Lyon	Rhône	Pont-de-Saône; Pont-de-la-Guillotière	Before 1050; Begun c. 1180–1182
Mâcon	Saône-et-Loire	Repairs at that time	1362–1367
Magny-en-Vexin	Seine-et-Oise	Two bridges	1260
Maguelone	Hérault		c. 1129 – c. 1158
Mailly-la-Ville	Yonne	Later ruined by neglect	14th century
Mailly-le-Château	Yonne		15th century
Mans, Le	Sarthe	Pont Perrin; Pont Ysoard or Ysoir	12th century 1067–1078
Mantes	Seine-et-Oise	In 1185 Louis VII confirmed an act of 1121 mentioning the bridge	1185
Marcigny	Saône-et-Loire	Later disappeared	12th century
Marquefave	Haute-Garonne		1413
Marseille	Bouches-du-Rhône	Pont des Béroards; Pont de Velut	1255; 1352; 1436
Mathefelon, com. Tiercé	Maine-et-Loire	Repaired at that date	1454
Mauléon	Basses-Pyrénées		1289
Mayenne	Mayenne		1028
Meaux	Seine-et-Marne		991
Melun	Seine-et-Marne		1212
Mende	Lozère	Pont Notre-Dame	14th century
Mesnil-Durand, Le	Calvados	Pont Alerie (=Pontalery)	1320
Metz	Moselle	Pont Saint-Georges; Pont-des-Morts or Moyen Pont; Pont-Thiffroy; Le Grand Pont des Morts; Also at Auboiré near Metz	Before 13th century 1222–1223; 1222; 1245; 1240
Meulan	Seine-et-Oise		1182
Meung	Loiret		13th century
Mézières	Ardennes	Repairs	1497–1498
Millançay	Loir-et-Cher		1387–1389
Millau	Aveyron	Pont Vieux; New bridge	Before 1156; Before 1286
Moissac	Tarn-et-Garonne		1120
Montargis	Loiret		1234
Montauban	Tarn-et-Garonne		c. 1336
Montélimar	Drôme		1360
Montereau-Faut-Yonne	Seine-et-Marne		c. 1016–1037
Montferrand	Puy-de-Dôme		1308
Montier-en-Der	Haute-Marne		876
Montignac	Dordogne	Over the Vézère; Stone piers	11th century
Montignac-le-Petit	Dordogne	Over the Ille	1281
Montmorot, suburb of Lons-le-Saulnier	Jura		1439
Montolieu	Aude		1392
Montouron	Maine-et-Loire		1458
Montpellier	Hérault	Pont sur le Lève	1267
Montpont, arr. Riberac	Dordogne		1376
Montréal	Gers		1411
Montréal, cant. Isle-au-Serain	Yonne	Moulin du pont	1204
Montreuil-Bonnin, com. Vouillé	Vienne	On the Boivre	
Montreuillon	Nièvre		1213
Montségur	Ariège		1265
Moret-sur-Loing	Seine-et-Marne		1499
Motte-de-Bourbon, com. Pouançay	Vienne		1455
Mouy	Oise		1320
Najac	Aveyron	Pont de la Frégère, on the Aveyron	1288
Nantes	Loire-Inférieure	Pont-en-Vertais	14th century
Narbonne	Aude	Pont des Marchands	Roman and 1227
Natiaux, com. Avrolles	Yonne	Pont-des-Natiaux, on the Armançon	1147
Negueromieu or St. Hilaire	Haute-Garonne	See Toulouse	
Nevers	Nièvre		1273
Nîmes	Gard		1308
Nogent-sur-Seine	Aube		1319
Norges-le-Pont, com. Norges	Côte-d'Or		1276
Nyons	Drôme	Nyons Bridge	1361
Olargues	Hérault	Pont du Diable	12th century
Olla, com. St. Egrène	Isère		13th century
Orange	Vaucluse		1368
Orléans	Loiret		Before 1176
Orthez	Basses-Pyrénées		By 1254
Oulchy-le-Château	Aisne		1287
Palaminy	Haute-Garonne	Washed out at that date	1388
Pamiers	Ariège		1356
Paris	Seine	Grand Pont, Petit Pont; Pont-aux-Meuniers; Pont-Saint Michel; Pont-Notre-Dame	Ancient; After 1296; 1378; 1412–1416
Parrigneux, near Roussillon	Ain		1290
Passavant	Marne	Drawbridge and Pont-aux Vendages	1287
Périgny-la-Rose	Aube	Bridges of Pugny	1175
Périgueux	Dordogne	Ancient bridges Stone bridge Pons Sancti Hilarii	1206; 1363
Perpignan	Pyrénées-Orientales		1275
Pessac, Saint-Martin-de-	Gironde	Bridge at the archbishop's residence at La Motte-de-Pessac	1354
Pichaumeix or Pechaumeix, com. Saint-Mihiel	Meuse		1280–1282
Pierre-Châtel, com. Virignin	Ain	Replaced in 1226	Ancient, 1226
Pierrepont, cant. Marle	Aisne	Castrum Petraepontis	938, 1165
Pierrepont	Calvados	Petrepons	1145
Pierrepont	Oise		1198
Pierrepont-sur-l'Arentèle	Vosges		1302
Poissy	Yvelines		1162
Poitiers	Vienne	Pont Achard, on the Boivre; Pont Joubert; Pont Cyprien, on the Clain; Pontneuf (or Pont de Rochereuil) to bourg of Montierneuf	1017; 1083; 1101; 1087
Pomblin	Aube	Pont Belin	1287
Pompertuzat	Haute-Garonne	Jerusalem Itinerary	333
Pompierre	Vosges		6th century, 1179
Ponant, com. Livet-et-Gavet	Isère	Pons Nahon	14th century
Ponnesant, com. Saint-Martin-sur-Ouanne	Yonne	Ponsnascentius	855, 1188
Ponrault, com. Migné	Vienne	Pons Regales	993–1029
Pontréau	Vienne		993-1030
Pons	Charente-Inférieure		1242
Pons, Le Grand Logis, com. St.-Pierre-de-Chartreuse	Isère		12th century
Pons Aerarius or Ponte Herarum, between communes of Bellegard and Arles	Bouches-du-Rhône	Jerusalem Itinerary	333
Pons de Craut	Oise	See Rochy-Condé	
Pons-de-Rastel, Le, com. Genolhac	Gard		1212
Pons Sancti Hugonis, between communes of La Chapelle-du-Bard (Isère) and Arvillard (Savoie)	Isère, Savoie	Bridge on the Bens, now called Pont-du-Diable	14th century
Pont, Le, com. Peuvert	Aude	Pons de Blavo	1259
Pont	Aveyron		1484–1489
Pont, Le, com. Naucelles	Cantal		1442
Pont, Le, com. Dienne	Cantal		1485
Pont, Le, com. Feux	Cher		1464
Pant, Le, com. Lugny-Champagne	Cher		1302
Pant, Le, com. Moulins-sur-Yèvre	Cher		1484
Pont, Le, communes of Reigny and Saint-Christophe-le-Chaudry	Cher		1449
Pont, Le, Pralemine or Saint-Priest, domaine, com. Charenton-du-Cher	Cher	Pons Sancti Preijecti	1319
Pont	Côte-d'Or		937 or 938, 1257
Pont, Le, com. Bligny-sur-Ouche	Côte-d'Or	In molendino de Ponte	1238
Pont, Le, com. Pont-et-Massène	Côte-d'Or		1368
Pont, Le, com. Grignol	Dordogne	Molendinum dict. de Ponte	1308
Pont, Le, com. Neuvic	Dordogne		1471
Pont, Le, com. Vallereuil	Dordogne		1440
Pont, Le, com. Bailleau-sous-Gallardon	Eure-et-Loir	Pons Petre	1241
Pont, Chemin de	Eure-et-Loir	From Vauparfonds to Luisant	1300
Pont, Le, com. Tharaux	Gard		1292
Pont, Le, com. Saint-Pal-de-Mons	Haute-Loire		1314
Pont, Le, com. Lavoûte-Chilhac	Haute-Loire		1288
Pont, Le, com. Herbeys	Isère	Ponte Vitreo	14th century
Pont, Le, com. Saint-Pierre-de-Mésage	Isère	Pons de Rippis and Pons de Romanche	13th century
Pont, Le, com. Villefontaine	Isère		15th century
Pont, Moulin du, com. Bazougers	Mayenne		1277
Pont, Moulin du, com. Coussay	Vienne	Farm and windmill	1473
Pont, Le, com. Genouillé	Vienne		1403
Pont, Le, com. Lhommaizé	Vienne		1469
Pont, Moulin du, com. Saint-Genest	Vienne	On the Fontpoise	1474
Pont, Le, com. Saix	Vienne	Hostel du Pont	1476
Pont, Le, com. Dommartin-lès-Remiremont	Vosges		1235
Pont-à-Bucy, cant. Crécy-sur-Serre	Aisne	Pons-de-Nogento-Abbatisse	1170
Pont-à-Chaussy, com. Courcelles-Chaussy	Moselle	To the left of the Nied Française; Pont-aux-Loups or Pont Quinquobeille	1324; 15th century
Pont-à-Couleuvre, Le, com. Auffrique-et-Nogent	Aisne	Pons de Colovere	1145
Pontageon, com. Ventenges	Haute-Loire	Pontago	1279
Pontaigon, com. Lhommaizé	Vienne	Pontum Aigone; Pontaigum	916; 1223
Pontailler	Côte-d'Or	Pontiliacus; Pons Lindi; In villa Pontiliaco	869; 872; 1049
Pontaix, com. Die	Drôme	Mutatio Darentiaca of the Jerusalem Itinerary	333
Pont-Alain, Le, com. Saint-Berthevin	Mayenne	Le moulin et reffoul de Pontalain	1443
Pont-à-Luc, communes of Nîmes and Marguerittes	Gard	Footbridge	1301
Pontamafrey	Savoie	Pons Amalfredi	1190
Pont-à-Mousson	Meurthe		896, 905, 1230
Pont-Annet, com. Priziac	Morbihan	On the brook Pont-Rouge	1431
Pontarcher, com. Ambleny	Aisne	De Ponte-Archerii	1320
Pont-Arcy	Aisne	Pons-de-Arserio	1232
Pontardennes, com. Wizernes	Pas-de-Calais	Pont d'Artengues	1469
Pontarie, La, com. Saint-Laurent	Dordogne		1460
Pontarlier	Doubs	On site of Ariorica in the Antonine Itinerary	13th century
Pontarm, com. Assérac	Loire-Inférieure	De Ponte Armore	14th century
Pont-Arnaud, com. Monsec	Dordogne		1373
Pont-Arnaud, com. Nîmes	Gard	Bridge on the Cadereau	1380
Pontarrane, com. Compagne	Aude	Mill of Pontarrana on the Aude	1373
Pontarrou, Le, com. Magrie, sect. A.	Aude		1257
Pont-à-Sault, com. Dourges	Pas-de-Calais		1271
Pont-Asquin, com. Wardrecques	Pas-de-Calais		1306
Pont-Astier, com. Saint-Pal-de-Chalencon	Haute-Loire		1163
Pontaubert	Yonne	Pons-Herberti	1167
Pont-Audemer	Eure	Brivodurum; Duos Pontes; Pont-Audemer	Ancient; 715; 1027
Pont-Auffroy, com. Chevru	Seine-et-Marne	Mill	1210
Pontaujard, com. Montbrison	Drôme	Pons Aujart	1332
Pontault, com. Nottonville	Eure-et-Loir		1468
Pontauriol, com. Cassaigne	Aude	A brook	1468
Pont-Authou	Eure	Pons Altou	1024
Pont-Auvray, Le, com. Landivy	Mayenne		12th century
Pont-aux-Dames	Seine-et-Marne		1226
Pont-aux-Moines, communes Chécy and Mardié	Loiret		1075
Pont-à-Vaches, com. Béthune	Pas-de-Calais		1215
Pont-à-Vendin	Pas-de-Calais		1024
Pontavert	Aisne	Pons Vardius	1112
Pontazel, com. Bram	Aude		1315
Pontbagnes	Isère	Formerly near Izeaux	13th century
Pont-Barrois, Le, com. Concressault	Cher		1345
Pont-Barse, com. Courteranges	Aube		1183
Pontbeau	Savoie	A domain	12th century
Pont-Bellanger	Calvados		1203
Pont-Benoist, com. Sainte-Colombe	Seine-et-Marne	Mill and old fief	1256
Pont-Bernard, Le, com. Montmançon	Côte-d'Or		1303
Pont-Bernard, between communes of Beaufin and Aspres-lès-Corps	Isère, Hautes-Alpes	On the Drac	14th century
Pont-Besnier, Le, between communes of Juigné and Auvers-le-Hamon	Sarthe		1321
Pont-Besse, Le, com. Laveissière	Cantal		1490
Pont-Bone, com. Lembras	Dordogne		1373
Pontcallec, com. Berné	Morbihan	Brook and pond	1291
Pontcarlet, com. Hueg	Isère		14th century
Pont-Carpin, communes of Grenoble and Saint-Martin-d'Hères	Isère	On the brook Grande-Morgne	13th century
Pontcarré	Seine-et-Marne	Fief	15th century
Pontcerme, com. Coursan	Aude	A farm; Pons Septimus	1352
Pont-Cervier, Le, com. Cohade	Haute-Loire	On the Vendage	1323
Pontcharain, com. Theys	Isère	Pons Charen	13th century
Pontcharra	Isère, Savoie		13th century
Pontchartrain	Eure-et-Loir	See Brezolles	
Pontchartrain, com. Saint-Mard-de-Réno	Orne		Gallo-Roman
Pontchartrain	Seine-et-Oise	See Jouars-Pontchartrain	
Pontchâteau	Loire-Inférieure		11th century
Pont-Chauvet, Le, com. La Celle-Condé	Cher		1450
Pont-Croissant, com. Montbonnot-Saint-Martin	Isère		14th century
Pont-d'Aby, Le, com. Narbonne	Aude	Old bridge on the road from Narbonne to Capestang	1329
Pont-d'Ain	Ain		13th century or 1326
Pont-d'Ainon, Le, com. Plaimpied-Givaudins	Cher		1300
Pont-d'Aisy, Le, com. Aisy-sous-Thil	Côte-d'Or		1255
Pont-d'Ambel, between communes of Ambel and Corps	Isère	On the Drac	13th century
Pont-Dandon, cant. Molières	Gard		1301
Pont-d'Anglars	Dordogne		1489
Pont-d'Aurel, Le, communes of Aurel and Vercheny	Drôme		1193
Pont-d'Authie, com. Jussac	Cantal		1369
Pont-d'Avene, com. Gigean	Hérault		1376–1378
Pont-d'Avord, Le, com. Farges-en-Septaine	Cher		1460
Pont-de-Barangeon, Le, com. Vignoux-sur-Barangeon	Cher		1260
Pont-de-Barret, Le, com. Dieulefit	Drôme	Locus qui prius dictus est Sayenna et modo dicitur ad Pontem	956
Pont-de-Beauvoisin, Le	Isère	Pontem Castellum	11th century
Pont-de-Brion, communes Lavars and Roissard	Isère		14th century
Pont-de-Briques, Le, com. Saint-Léonard	Pas-de-Calais		1203
Pont-de-Camarès	Aveyron		1311
Pont-de-Cernon, com. Chapareillan	Isère		14th century
Pont-de-Champ, between communes of Jarrie and Champ	Isère	Bridge over the Romanche	13th century
Pont-de-Chargy, Le, com. Barneçon	Cher		1350
Pont-de-Charréas, Charrées, com. Malrevers	Haute-Loire		1253
Pont-de-Chéruy	Isère		13th century
Pont-de-Cognet, between communes of Cognet and Saint-Jean-d'Hérans	Isère	Bridge over the Drac	13th century
Pont-de-Coly, cant. Montignac	Dordogne		1460
Pont de Cordéac et de Quet-en-Beaumont, above the village of Gautiers	Isère	Pons Rumieuf	13th century
Pont-de-Coubon, com. Coubon	Haute-Loire		1095
Pont-de-Cros, Le, com. Murat	Cantal	Pons del Cros apud Muratum	1289
Pont-de-Gavet, com. Livre-du-Genet, near Grenoble	Isère		Gallo-Roman
Pont-de-Gennes	Sarthe	Le Pont de Gene	1357
Pont-de-Gers, com. Vienne	Isère		15th century
Pont-de-Jaillon, Le, com. Jaillon	Meurthe	Le Pont-a-Jaillons	1291
Pont-de-la-Beaurone, com. Chancelade	Dordogne		1115
Pont-de-la-Bourne, com. Villard-de-Lans	Isère		14th century
Pont-de-la-Chartreuse, Le, com. Brives-Charensac	Haute-Loire	Parvus Pons	c. 1210
Pont-de-la-Morge, Le, com. Moirans	Isère	Bridge on the Morge	14th century
Pont-de-la-Motte, between communes of Avignonet and La Motte-Saint-Martin	Isère	On the Drac	13th century
Pont-de-la-Peyre, Le, com. Fanjeaux	Aude		1442
Pont-de-la-Peyre, com. Bergerac	Dordogne		1467
Pont-de-la-Raz, com. Valjouffrey	Isère		14th century
Pont-de-l'Arche	Eure		c. 1020
Pont-de-la-Reynette, cant. Nîmes	Gard	On the Fontaine	1380
Pont-de-la-Romanche, com. Le Bourg-d'Oisans	Isère	Pons Medius	13th century
Pont-de-l'Enceinte, Le, com. Yssingeaux	Haute-Loire	Mill and bridge on the Lignon; Pons voc. de la Saynta	1273
Pont-de-l'Escure, Le, com. Saint-Flour	Cantal	La Plancha	1369
Pont-de-l'Herbasse, Le, com. Clérieux	Drôme		1468
Pont-de-Limon, com. Courtomer	Seine-et-Marne	At Pontpierre	1365
Pont-de-Livier, Le, com. Bellegarde	Gard		1380
Pont-de-l'Oula, Le, com. Saint-Pierre-de-Mésage	Isère		14th century
Pont-de-Lussac, Le, com. Mazerolles	Vienne		12th century
Pont-de-Maillé, Le, com. Saint-Martin-l'Ars	Vienne		1482
Pont-de-Marne, Le, com. Langres	Haute-Marne		854
Pont-de-Mars, Le, com. Chambon	Haute-Loire		1254
Pont-de-Moeurs, Le, communes Moeurs and Sézanne	Marne	Le moulin du Pont-à-Meure	1493
Pont-de-Montgnon, com. Juilly	Seine-et-Marne		1467
Pont-d'Entraygues, Le	Aveyron	See Entraygues	
Pont-de-Pierre, Le, com. Morogues	Cher		1457
Pont-de-Pierre, Le, com. Auxonne	Côte-d'Or		1442
Pont-de-Pierre, Le, cant. Bellefontaine	Vosges		1436
Pont-de-Portes, Le, communes Séchilienne and Saint-Barthélemy-de-Séchilienne	Isère	Ruined bridge on the Romanche	14th century
Pont-de-Quaix, com. Quaix	Isère	Bridge on the Vence	14th century
Pont-de-Quart, Le, com. Beaumont-lès-Valence	Drôme		1483
Pont-de-Rochefort, Le, com. Alleyras	Haute-Loire	Bridge on the Allier	1345
Pont-de-Roison, Le, between communes of Nantes-en-Ratier and Siévoz	Isère		13th century
Pont-de-Ruan	Indre-et-Loire	The ancient Rotomagus of the Peutinger Table	6th century, also 9th century
Pont-de-Saint-Martin, Le, com. Agonac	Dordogne		1367
Pont-de-Saint-Martin, Le, between communes of Clelles and Saint-Martin-de-Clelles	Isère	Bridge over the Orbanne	14th century
Pont-de-Saint-Nicolas de Campagnac	Gard	See Campagnac	
Pont-des-Anjalvis, com. Menet	Cantal		1441
Pont-des-Echelles, between communes of Entre-deux-Guiers and Les Échelles	Isère, Savoie	Bridge on the Guiers-Vif	13th century
Pont-de-Soirans, com. Soirans-Fouffrans	Côte-d'Or		1390-1391
Pont-d'Estrouilhas, Le, communes of Aiguilhe and Espaly-Saint-Marcel	Haute-Loire	On the Borne	1245
Pont-de-Sumène, com. Blavozy	Haute-Loire		1359
Pont-d'Etaules, com. Saint-Seine-sur-Vingeanne	Côte-d'Or		1322
Pont-de-Tréboul, Le, com. Sainte-Marie	Cantal		15th century
Pont-de-Vaux	Ain		c. 1250
Pont-de-Vaux, com. Marly-sous-Issy	Saône-et-Loire		1312
Pont-de-Vaux, com. Millac	Vienne		1451
Pont-de-Veyle	Ain		1186
Pont-de-Veyton, Le, between communes of Allevard and Pinsot	Isère	Bridge on the brook Veyton	12th century
Pont-d'Isalguier	Haute-Garonne	See Toulouse	
Pont-d'Iverny, Le, com. Montmirail	Sarthe		c. 969
Pont-d'Ognon, Le, com. Homps	Aude		1231
Pont-d'Ouilly	Calvados		1125
Pont-du-Boeuf, com. Saint-Blaise-du-Buis	Isère	Pons Boum; Pons de Bos	14th century
Pont-du-Bourniou, Le, com. Ladinhac	Cantal		1464
Pont-du-Château	Puy-de-Dôme		Before 1151
Pont-du-Diable	Isère, Savoie	See Pons Sancti Hugonis	
Pont-du-Fieu, Le, com. Saint-Julien-d'Ance	Haute-Loire	On the Ance	1417
Pont-du-Fort, Le, com. Troarn	Calvados		1310
Pont-du-Gard, com. Remoulins	Gard	Roman aqueduct on the Gardon; called Pons de Gartio in 1295	Roman
Pont-du-Gy, Le, communes of Duisans and Étrun	Pas-de-Calais	Le Pons Duisy	1364
Pont-du-Monastère	Dordogne	See Brantôme	
Pont-du-Prat, Le, com. Valjouffrey	Isère	On the Bonne	14th century
Pont-du-Prêtre, Le, com. Valbonnais	Isère	Pons Sacerdoto	15th century
Pont-du-Roi, Le, com. Tigery	Seine-et-Oise	No evidence for Middle Ages	Roman
Pont-du-Sault, between communes of Porcieu-Amblagnieu and Villebois	Isère, Ain	Bridge over the Rhône	14th century
Pont-du-Vau, Le, com. Til-Châtel	Côte-d'Or	Molendinum Pontis de Valle	1203
Pont-du-Vers, com. St. Chef	Isère		15th century
Pont-Echanfré	Eure	First name of Notre-Dame-du-Hamel; Pons Herchenfret in the 11th century, but Beata Marie de Hamilla in 1260	11th century, 1260
Pontécoulant	Calvados	Pons Escoulandi	11th century
Pontempeyrat, com. Craponne-sur-Arzon	Haute-Loire	Pons Empeyra	1311
Pont-en-Royans	Isère		11th century
Pont-en-Vertais	Loire-Inférieure	Now inside Nantes	14th century
Pont-Érembourg, com. Saint-Denis-de-Méré	Calvados		1108
Pont-Évêque	Isère		11th century
Pontevin, com. Chatenay-Mâcheron	Haute-Marne	Terra de Pontguayn; Pont Vahin	1219; 1240
Pont-Eyraud, com. Saint-Aulaye	Dordogne		1245
Pont-Farcy	Calvados		1278
Pontfaverger	Marne	Pons Fabricatus	Beginning of 11th century
Pontfère, com. Laveissière	Cantal		15th century
Pont Flavien, near Saint-Chamas	Bouches-du-Rhône		Roman
Pontfol, com. Saint-Michel-de-Lanès	Aude		1353
Pontfrault, com. Château-Landon	Seine-et-Marne	Pons Feraudi	c. 1090
Pontgallet, com. Bazoche-Gouet	Eure-et-Loir	Pons-Galeti	1215
Pont-Gibaut, com. Saint-Christophe-le-Chaudry	Cher	Place name	1178
Pontgibert, com. Saint-Bérain	Haute-Loire	Pons Gilbert	1343
Pont-Gilbert, com. Torcy	Seine-et-Marne	Molendinum de Ponte Gilbert	1263
Pont-Givart, communes Arainville and Pignicourt	Aisne	Aumenancourt-le-Grand and Aumenancourt-le-Petit	1146
Pontgouin	Eure-et-Loir	Pons Godonis	1099
Pont-Gras, Rue du, Louviers	Eure		1455
Pont-Gros, com. Tullins	Isère		14th century
Pont-Hannois, com. La Croix-en-Brie	Seine-et-Marne		1270
Ponthaut, com. Allevard	Isère	Nemus Pontis Altis	14th century
Ponthaut, communes Saint-Laurent-en-Beaumont and Sousville	Isère		10th and 13th centuries
Pont-Hébert	Eure	Quarter of the fief Meuille	1411
Pont-Hémery, Le, com. Brazey-en-Plaine	Côte-d'Or	Pons Haymerici	1225
Pont-Herbert, com. Saint-Clair	Manche		1361–1388
Ponthévrard	Seine-et-Oise	Pons Ebrardi	1162
Ponthion	Marne	Pontico; Pons Ugone; Ponteum	c. 590 c. 768; 1150
Pont-Honfroy, com. Rouen	Seine-Maritime	Place name has disappeared	4th century, c. 1050
Ponthouion	Sarthe		11th century
Pont-Hubault, com. Ruaudin	Sarthe		1270
Pont-Hubert, Le, com. Pont-Sainte-Marie	Aube		1154
Pontignol, Le, com. Fanjeaux	Aude	Ad Pontilhol; Ad Pontem de Insula	1345; 1364
Pontignol, Le, com. Fonters-du-Razès	Aude		1347
Pontignol, Le, com. Laurac	Aude		1330
Pontignol, Le, com. Narbonne	Aude		1157
Pontignol, Le, com. Villasavary	Aude		1139
Pontigny, com. Condé sur le Nied	Moselle	Pont-deniet	1339; 1404
Pontigny	Yonne	Before that date a new bridge	Before 1140
Pont-Jehan, com. Saint-Lyphard	Loire-Inférieure		1413
Pont Julien, near Apt	Vaucluse	Extant	Roman
Pont-l'Abbé, com. Sainte-Mère-Église	Manche		1369
Pont-Landry, Le, com. Ambrières	Mayenne		1209
Pont-la-Ville, com. Châteauvillain	Haute-Marne		1196
Pont-lès-Bonfays	Vosges		10th century, 1303
Pont-l'Évêque	Calvados		12th century
Pont-l'Évêque	Finistère		12th century
Pontlevoy	Loir-et-Cher	Pons leviatus	1075
Pontlieue, suburb of Le Mans	Sarthe	Bridge on the Huisne; Pontileuga; Ad pontem Leuge	616; 10th century, 1212
Pont-Long, Le, arr. Pau	Pyrénées-Atlantiques		1277
Pontloup, com. Moret-sur-Loing	Seine-et-Marne	Old priory of Saint-Pierre, dependent on the abbey of Vézelay; Pontloe; Pons Luppae	c. 1150; 1285
Pontmain, com. Saint-Ellier	Mayenne	De Ponte Monii	1225
Pont-Marès, Le, com. Saint-André-de-Valborgne	Gard		1437
Pontmarsa, com. Villasavary	Aude		1332
Pont-Minard, com. Forcey	Haute-Marne		1174
Pontmoulin, com. Chailly-en-Brie	Seine-et-Marne	Molendinum de Pont Morlen	1132
Pont-Neuf, Le, com. Die	Drôme	Pont Fract, on the Drôme	13th century
Pont-Neuf, Le, com. Polignac	Haute-Loire	Le Pont-Nou	1408
Pontoise	Oise, Val-d'Oise	Two ancient bridges called Briva Isarae	Gallo-Roman; 10th century, 1227
Pontôme, com. Courgains	Sarthe		1314
Pontorson	Manche	Repairs at that date	1366
Pontoux	Saône-et-Loire	Pons Dubis	Peutinger Table
Pont-Pastoul	Dordogne	Bridge on the Drôme	12th century
Pont-Pérant, com. Saint-Laurent-du-Pont	Isère	Ruined bridge on the Guiers-Mort	14th century
Pontpérier, com. Laurac	Aude		1432–1519
Pont-Perrin, Mill of, com. Évreux	Eure		1187
Pont-Perrin, Le, com. Payroux	Vienne	On the Clain	1404
Pont-Peyrat	Dordogne		1403
Pont-Peyrène, com. Roquesvaire	Bouches-du-Rhône	On the Huveaune	1452
Pontpierre, com. Désertines	Mayenne		1220
Pontpierre	Moselle	To the right of the deutsche Nied	1332
Pont-Pierre, communes Bernay and Courtomer	Seine-et-Marne	On the Yères	c. 1210
Pont-Pierre, com. Villeblevin	Yonne		1290
Pontpoint	Oise		1199
Pont-Réan	Ille-et-Vilaine	Preserves name of Roman bridge	Roman
Pont-Renard, com. Saint-Pal-de-Chalencon	Haute-Loire		12th century
Pont-Rigault, com. Les Trois-Moutiers	Vienne		1416
Pont-Robert, com. Bergerac	Dordogne		1460
Pont-Roide, com. Meaux	Seine-et-Marne	On the Marne; Farinarium super fluvium Maternam ad Pontem rapidum	9th century
Pont-Rouft, Le, com. Aiguesvives	Gard	Ad Pontem-Ruptum, ad Pontem-Fractem	1299
Pont-Rouge, com. Allemond	Isère	Bridge on the Romanche	14th century
Pont-Rougier, com. Chomelix	Haute-Loire	On the Arzon; bridge destroyed	1404
Pont-Roumieu, com. Saint-Germain-et-Mons	Dordogne		1290
Pont-Rousseau, com. Rezé	Loire-Atlantique		1135
Pont-Roux, com. Rouillac	Charente		1075–1101
Pont-Royal, com. Chapareillan	Isère	On the Glandon	14th century
Ponts, Les Cinq, com. Meuvic	Dordogne	A fief	1490
Ponts, com. Eu	Seine-Maritime		1181–1189
Pont-Sainte-Maxence	Oise		779
Pont-Saint-Esprit	Gard		Begun 1265
Pont-Saint-Laurent, com. Saint-Laurent-du-Pont	Isère	Bridge on the Guiers-Mort	15th century
Pont-Saint-Manut, com. Douville	Dordogne		1310
Pont-Saint-Mard	Aisne		1296
Pont-Saint-Martin, between communes of Saint-Christophe-Entre-Deux-Guiers and Saint-Christophe	Isère, Savoie	Bridge on the Guiers-Vif	15th century
Pont-Saint-Martin, communes Saint-Michel-les-Portes and Saint-Martin-de-Clelles	Isère	On the brook Saint Michel	14th century
Pont-Saint-Martin	Loire-Atlantique		1179
Pont-Saint-Ours, Le, com. Coulanges-lès-Nevers	Nièvre		1251
Pont-Saint-Pierre	Eure		911–1066
Pont-Saint-Vincent	Meurthe		1177
Pont-Sanguèze, com. Vallet	Loire-Atlantique		1454
Pontscorff, com. Cléguer	Morbihan		1280
Ponts-de-Cé, Les	Maine-et-Loire	Probably there in Caesar's time	Gallo-Roman, also 11th century
Pont-Séchier, com. Livet-et-Gavet	Isère	On the Romanche	14th century
Pont-Ségur, com. Mizoën	Isère	On the Romanche	15th century
Pont-sur-Madon	Vosges		1409
Pont-sur-Meuse	Meuse		1106
Pont-sur-Seine	Aube	Duodecim Pontes	574, 864; attested 1153
Pont-sur-Vanne	Yonne		1159
Pont-sur-Yonne	Yonne		833, 13th century
Pont-Taulad, com. Cailhau	Aude	Name of a fief	1166
Pont-Thibout, Le, hamlet of Trancheville	Eure		1255
Pont-Tranchêtu, communes Fontenay-sur-Eure and Nogent-sur-Eure	Eure-et-Loir		c. 1117
"Pontus", near com. Véronnes	Côte-d'Or		815
Pontvallain	Sarthe	De ponte Valani	1098
Pontvianne, com. Solignac-sous-Roche	Haute-Loire		1293
Pontvien, Le, com. Livré	Mayenne	Capellam de Pont-Viviani	1184
Pont-Vieux, com. Entraigues	Isère	Pons Veyl, on the Marsanne	14th century
Pontvray, com. Sillery	Marne	Pons Varensis; Pont-Veroit	c. 850; 1227
Pont-Yblon, hamlet Bonneuil, cant. Gonesse	Seine-et-Oise		1093
Pont-Ysoir, Le	Sarthe	See Mans, Le	
Porte-Joie	Eure	Turning bridge	1198
Puy-de-Pont, com. Neuvic	Dordogne		1203
Radepont	Eure	Rotomagus in Antonine Itinerary but Radipons in 1034	1034
Régennes, Les, com. Appoigny	Yonne		1145
Remi	Somme	See Sailly	
Rennepont	Haute-Marne	Renepons	c. 1172
Ribemont	Aisne	Pro pontibus de Ribermont	1248
Riom	Puy-de-Dôme	Pont de Nonette	1303
Ris, Le, com. Varennes-lès-Nevers	Nièvre		1343
Robertière, La, near Saint-Georges-sur-Eure, arr. Évreux, cant. Nonancourt	Eure		1346
Rochelle, La	Charente-Maritime		1202
Rochemaux	Vienne	On the Charente	c. 1080
La Roche-Posay	Vienne	On the Creuse	1175
Rochy-Condé	Oise	Pons de Craut prope villam de Conde	1292
Romans, between communes of Romans and Bourg-de-Péage	Drôme	Bridge on the Isère	From mid-11th century
Romorantin	Loir-et-Cher		1336
Roque, La, cant. Bagnols	Gard	On the Cèze	13th century
Laroquebrou	Cantal		1281–1282
Roquecourbe	Tarn	On the Agout; Repairs	1317
Rouanne, near Nanteuil-le-Haudouin	Oise		13th century
Rouen	Seine-Maritime		Early 11th century
Sablé-sur-Sarthe	Sarthe		13th century
Sailly, between communes of Remi and Sailly	Somme		1236
Saint-Affrique	Aveyron	On the Sorgues	Before 1368
Saint-Antonin	Tarn-et-Garonne	On the Aveyron	1358
Saint-Astier	Dordogne		1293
Saint-Bertin, near Saint-Omer	Pas-de-Calais	On the Aa	1177-1187
Saint-Cloud	Hauts-de-Seine		1411
Saint-Denis	Seine-Saint-Denis	Pont Maubert; Pont-la-Reyne "De ponte de Trecines" between Saint-Denis and Montque	1138; 1233; Rebuilt not long before 1247
Sainte-Menehould	Marne	Pont de Berges; Pont de la Villeneuve; Pont de Gier	1287; 1287; 1287
Saintes	Charente-Maritime		Before 1201
Saint-Flour	Cantal	Bridge on the Aude to reach suburb Two other bridges across the Aude to reach mills: Pont de Roueyre; Pont-du-Colombier	Before 1250 13th century Under construction in 1273
Saint-Généroux	Deux-Sèvres		Traditionally 13th century
Saint-Geniez	Aveyron		1356
Saint-Geniez, at Martigues	Bouches-du-Rhône	Hospital of the bridge of Saint-Geniez	Before 1211
Saint-Guilhem-le-Désert	Hérault	Across the Gouffre-Noir of the Hérault	1031–1048
Saint-Jean-d'Angély	Charente-Maritime	A nearby bridge over the Charente was the scene of a fight that year	1380
Saint-Julien, com. Pierry	Marne		1239
Saint-Laurent-du-Pont	Isère		14th century
Saint-Lô	Manche	In ancient times called Briovera	Gallo-Roman
Saint-Maixent|Deux-Sèvres	Pont Charrault	1366	
Saint-Marceau	Sarthe		12th century
Saint-Maur-des-Fossés	Val-de-Marne		1205
Saint-Nicolas de Campagnac	Gard	See Campagnac	
Saint-Omer	Pas-de-Calais	"All the bridges over the river Aa between Saint-Omer and Gravelines."	1350
Saint-Pierre-de-Maillé	Vienne	On the Gartempe	1485
Saint-Pierre-du-Pont Neuf, com. Beaumont-sur-Sarthe	Sarthe		12th century
Saint-Pourçain	Allier	Under construction in that century	14th century
Saint-Quentin	Aisne		1237
Saint-Savin sur Gartempe	Vienne		Possibly 12th or 13th century
Saint-Secondin	Vienne		1329
Saint-Thibaut	Loiret	See Sully-sur-Loire	
Salbris	Loir-et-Cher		Gallo-Roman
Salon	Bouches-du-Rhône		1374
Salonnes	Moselle		950
Saturargues	Hérault		Before 1140
Saumur	Maine-et-Loire		Before 1162
Savines	Hautes-Alpes		14th century
Séchilienne	Isère	Ecclesia de S. Martini de Ponte-Roso	10th century
Sens	Yonne		Roman, 519, 1145
Sérant	Loiret	Repairs at that time	1387–1389
Serrières	Ardèche		1251
Seyssel, between communes of Seyssel (Ain) and Seyssel (Haute-Savoie)	Ain, Haute-Savoie	Over the Rhône; a bridge there only from 1300 to c. 1322	c. 1300 – c. 1322
Sommières	Gard	On the Vidourle, repaired in Middle Ages	Roman
Sône, La, between communes of La Sône and Saint-Just-de-Claix	Isère		13th century
Sorgues	Vaucluse		1125
Sospel	Alpes-Maritimes		Possibly 11th century
Sully-sur-Loire	Loiret		Ancient, 1318
Suze, La, arr. Le Mans	Sarthe		13th century
Taillebourg	Charente-Maritime	"Cum pratis amoenis et ponte optimo."	1242
Tarascon	Bouches-du-Rhône	Bridge to château of counts of Anjou	1448
Tennie	Sarthe		c. 1216
Terrason	Dordogne		1233
Terride-en-Gimoës, com. Saint-Georges	Gers		1295–1314
Thouars	Deux-Sèvres		13th century
Thourotte	Oise		13th century
Tocane-Saint-Âpre	Dordogne	Pont de Pardutz	1150
Tonnerre	Yonne	Bridges	1241
Toulouse	Haute-Garonne	Old Bridge attested Pont-de-la-Daurade or New Bridge; Pont de Las Clèdes; Pont-de-Bazacle; Bridges on the Hers: Pont de Pericole and Pont de Velours	1152; Before 1181; 1218; Before 1219; 1282
Tournon	Ardèche	On the Doux	Begun 1351
Tours	Indre-et-Loire	Over the Loire; Over the Cher	1031–1037; 1172–1178
Treix	Haute-Marne	Rebuilt at that date	862
Trilbardou on the Marne	Haute-Marne	See Treix	
La Trinité-Victor	Alpes-Maritimes	Ancient abutments of bridge of Moulin d'Ezé	
Troyes	Aube	Pont-Saint-Marie; Pont-de-la-Salle; Le Pont-Hubert; Pont-en-Bourbereau; Pont de Cailles over a canal Le grand pont des Moulins-aux-Monts and le pont Martinot; Pont de Sencey; Pont de Saint-Parres-les-Tertres and Pont de Fouchy	Roman, 1136; 1157; 1154; 1374; 13th century 1416; 1433; 1431
Tugny-et-Pont	Aisne		1197
Uzès	Gard		c. 860
Vaas	Sarthe	Repairs at that date	1382
Vabres	Aveyron	On the Dourdou	1302 or 1277
Valence	Drôme		1214
Varennes-sur-Allier	Allier		1258
Verdun	Meuse		6th century
Verlhac-Tescou	Tarn-et-Garonne		1306
Vermenton	Yonne	Over the Cure	1238
Vernay	Deux-Sèvres	See Airvault	
Vernon	Eure		Before 1223
Vicq-sur-Gartempe	Vienne		1285
Victot-Pontfol	Calvados	Ponsfolli (=Pontfol), Pons Stulti	1297
Vieille-Brioude	Haute-Loire	On the Allier	1340
Vieillevie	Cantal		1218
Vienne	Isère	Replacing old bridge	1251
Villefranche-de-Belvès	Dordogne		1357
Villemanoche	Yonne		823
Villeneuve-sur-Lot	Lot-et-Garonne		1282
Villeneuve-sur-Yonne	Yonne	Formerly Villeneuve-le-Roi	1186
Villerets, com. Écouis	Eure		1260
Vitry-le-François	Marne	Two bridges, one to a castle	1267
Vivonne	Vienne	Legacy for repairs to bridge	1264
Vizille	Isère	Washed out at that date	1336
Vouvant	Vendée		13th or 14th century
Warneton	Nord		1093–1111
Youle	Aveyron	On the Aveyron	1320

== See also ==
- List of Roman bridges
- List of medieval stone bridges in Germany

== Sources ==
- Marjorie Nice Boyer: Medieval French Bridges. A History, Cambridge: Massachusetts, The Mediaeval Academy of America 1976, ISBN 0-910956-58-8, pp. 171–195
