= Fonters-du-Razès =

Commune in Occitanie, France

- Commune
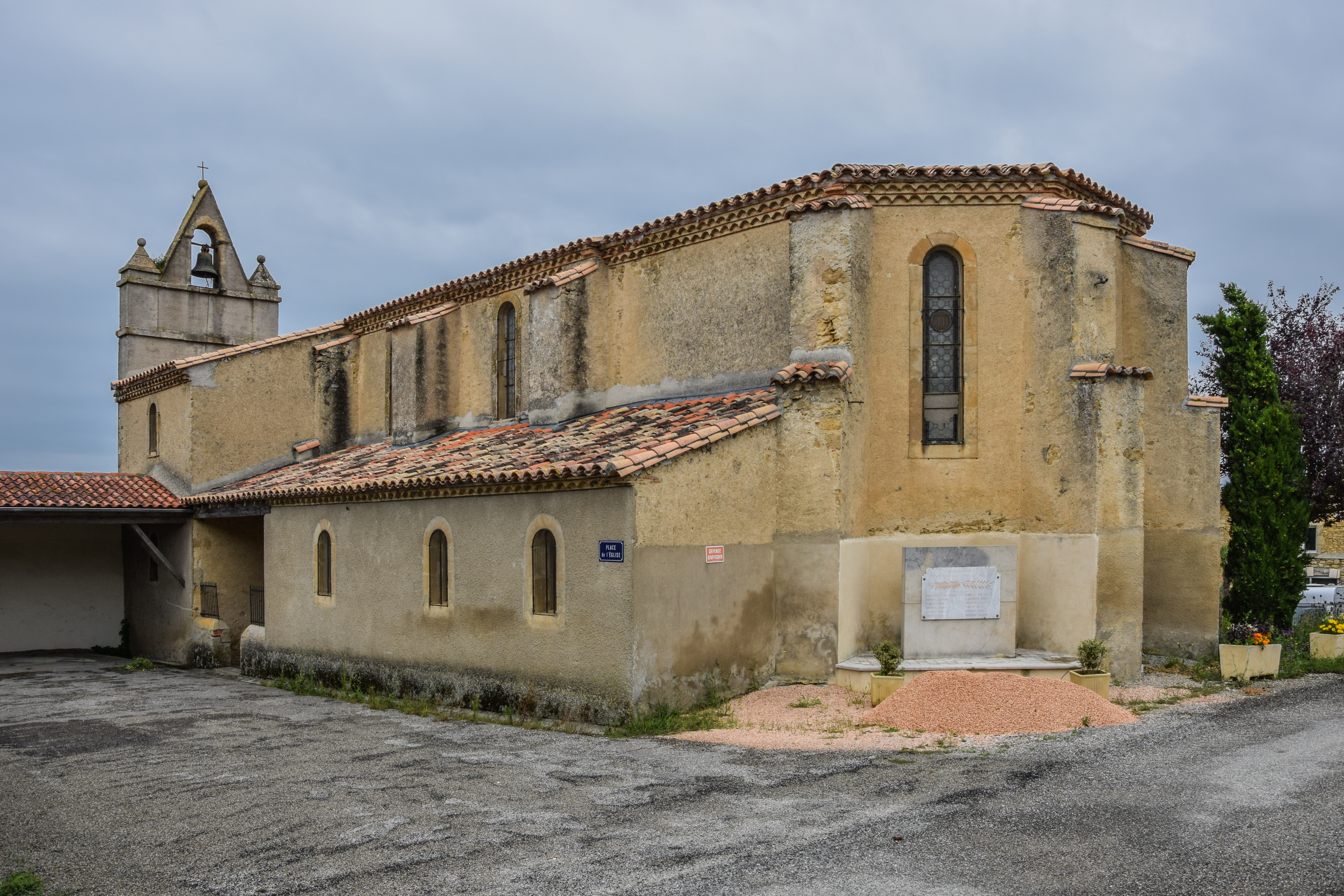
- The church in Fonters-du-Razès
- Location of Fonters-du-Razès
- Location within France Location within Occitanie
- Coordinates: 43°13′46″N 1°56′08″E
- Country: France
- Region: Occitania
- Department: Aude
- Arrondissement: Carcassonne
- Canton: La Piège au Razès
- Intercommunality: Piège Lauragais Malepère

Government
  - Mayor (2020–2026): Eric du Fayet de la Tour
- Area^{1}: 12.15 km^{2} (4.69 sq mi)
- Elevation: 385 m (1,263 ft)
- Highest elevation: 394 m (1,293 ft)
- Lowest elevation: 275 m (902 ft)
- Population (2023): 71
  - Density: 5.8/km^{2} (15/sq mi)
- Time zone: UTC+01:00 (CET)
  - Summer (DST): UTC+02:00 (CEST)
- INSEE/Postal code: 11149 /11400
- ^{1} French Land Register data, which excludes lakes, ponds, glaciers > 1 km^{2} (0.386 sq mi or 247 acres) and river estuaries.

Fonters-du-Razès is a commune in the Aude department in southern France.

== Population ==
Historical population
Year	Pop.	±% p.a.
1968	88	—
1975	81	−1.18%
1982	74	−1.28%
1990	68	−1.05%
1999	90	+3.16%
2007	90	+0.00%
2012	79	−2.57%
2017	79	+0.00%
2023	71	−1.76%
Source: INSEE

== See also ==
- Communes of the Aude department
- List of medieval bridges in France
