= Saint-Nicolas-de-Campagnac Bridge =

Bridge in France

Coordinates: 43°56′31″N 4°22′38″E

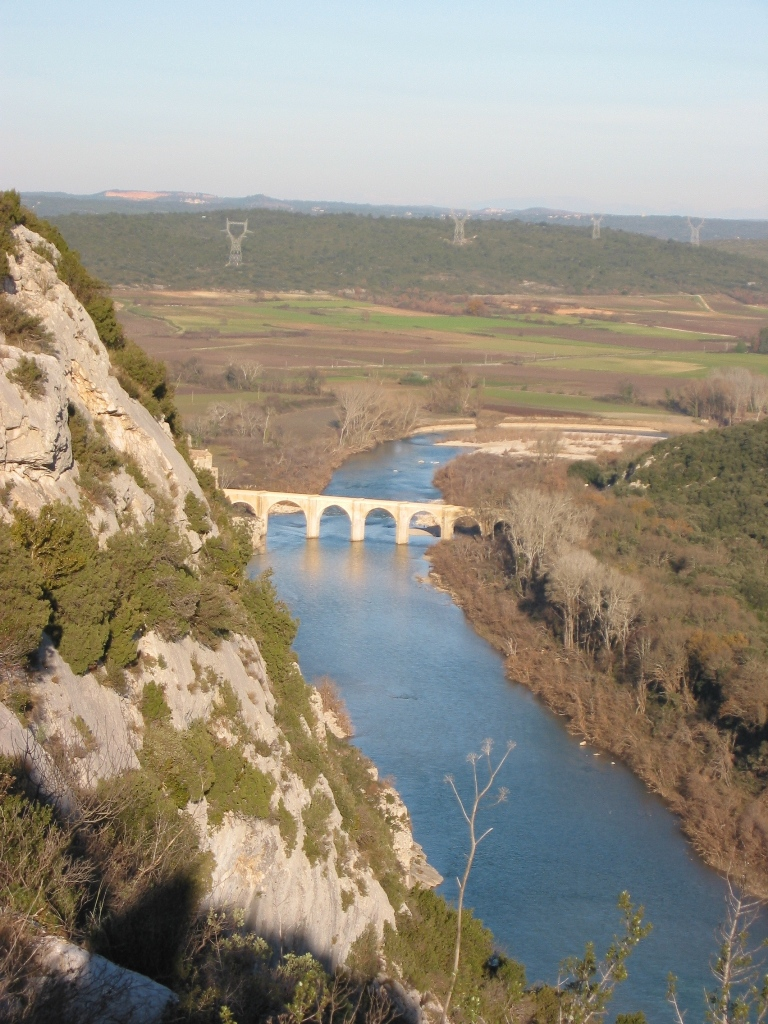
The Gardon at Pont Saint-Nicolas

The Saint-Nicolas-de-Campagnac Bridge (French Pont Saint-Nicolas-de-Campagnac) is an arch bridge crossing the river Gardon near Sainte-Anastasie, in the southern French department of Gard.

The bridge was built between 1245 and 1260.

It is crossed by departmental route 979 (D 979) from Nîmes to Uzès.

== See also ==
- List of medieval bridges in France
