= Villasavary =

Commune in Occitanie, France

- Commune
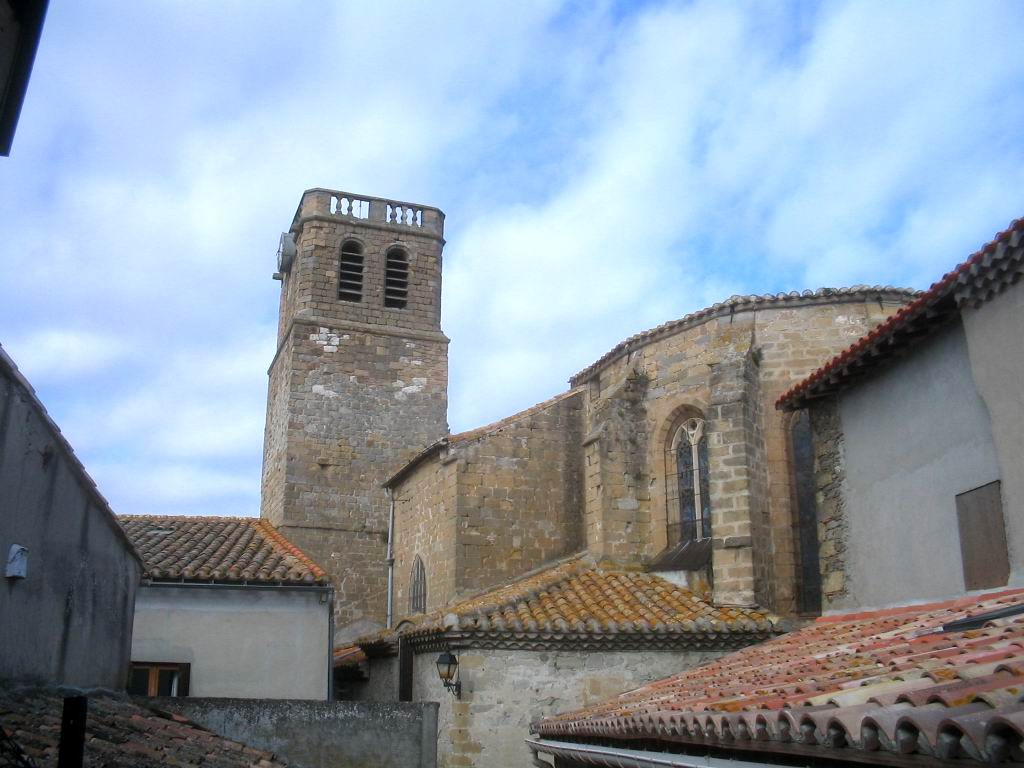
- The church in Villasavary

- Coat of arms
- Location of Villasavary
- Location within France Location within Occitanie
- Coordinates: 43°13′19″N 2°02′24″E
- Country: France
- Region: Occitania
- Department: Aude
- Arrondissement: Carcassonne
- Canton: La Piège au Razès

Government
  - Mayor (2020–2026): Jacques Danjou
- Area^{1}: 33.08 km^{2} (12.77 sq mi)
- Elevation: 220 m (720 ft)
- Highest elevation: 320 m (1,050 ft)
- Lowest elevation: 137 m (449 ft)
- Population (2023): 1,220
  - Density: 36.9/km^{2} (95.5/sq mi)
- Time zone: UTC+01:00 (CET)
  - Summer (DST): UTC+02:00 (CEST)
- INSEE/Postal code: 11418 /11150
- ^{1} French Land Register data, which excludes lakes, ponds, glaciers > 1 km^{2} (0.386 sq mi or 247 acres) and river estuaries.

Villasavary (French pronunciation: [vilasavaʁi]; Occitan: Le Vilar) is a commune in the Aude department in southern France.

== Geography ==
It is situated in the Lauragais region, between Toulouse and Carcassonne.

== Population ==
Historical population
Year	Pop.	±% p.a.
1968	885	—
1975	791	−1.59%
1982	819	+0.50%
1990	758	−0.96%
1999	874	+1.59%
2007	1,122	+3.17%
2012	1,267	+2.46%
2017	1,209	−0.93%
2023	1,220	+0.15%
Source: INSEE

== See also ==
- Communes of the Aude department
- List of medieval bridges in France
