= Lhommaizé =

- Commune
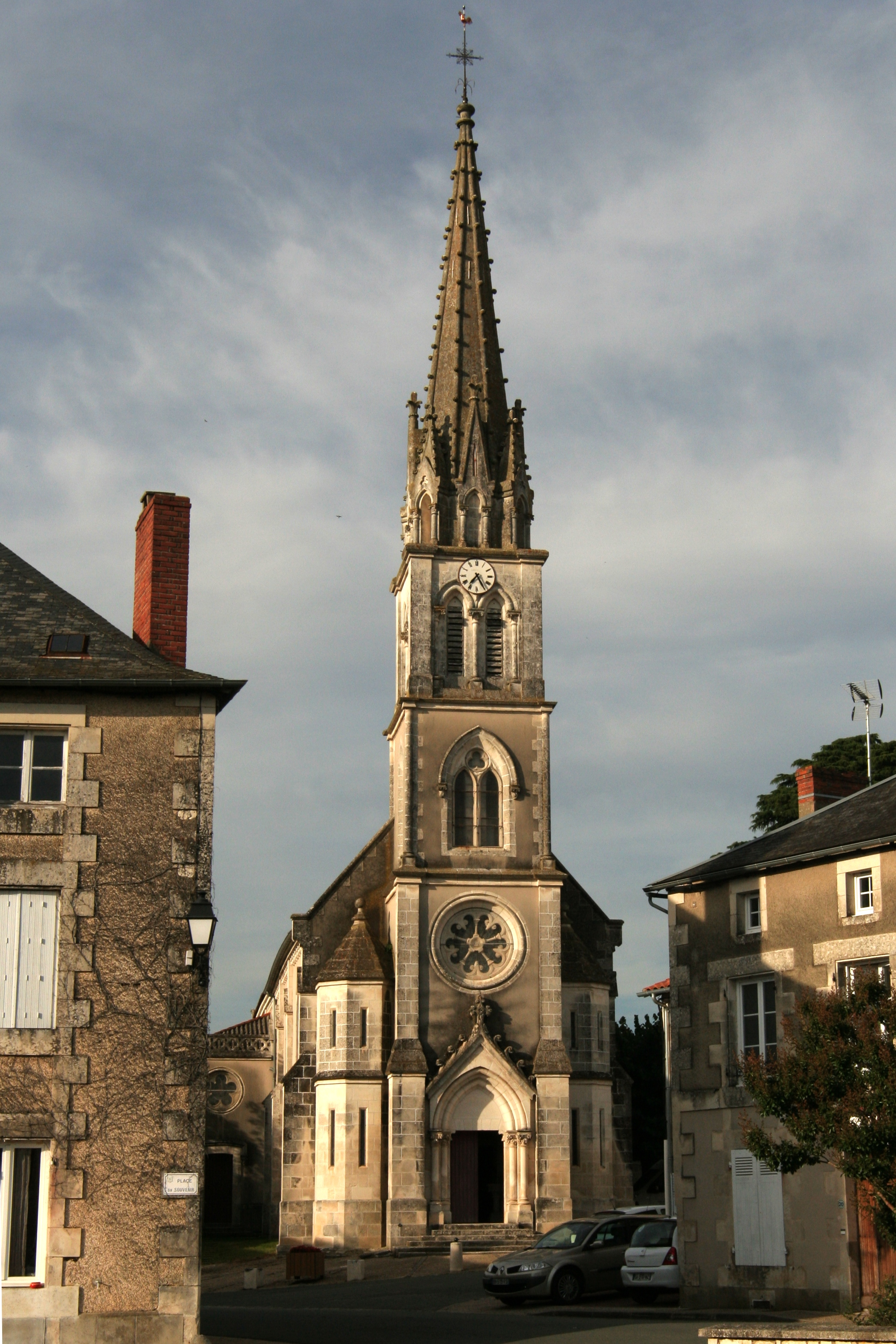
- The church of Saint-Jean-Baptiste, in Lhommaizé
- Location of Lhommaizé
- Location within France Location within Nouvelle-Aquitaine
- Coordinates: 46°26′13″N 0°35′57″E
- Country: France
- Region: Nouvelle-Aquitaine
- Department: Vienne
- Arrondissement: Montmorillon
- Canton: Lussac-les-Châteaux

Government
  - Mayor (2020–2026): Bernard Germaneau
- Area^{1}: 30.59 km^{2} (11.81 sq mi)
- Elevation: 103 m (338 ft)
- Highest elevation: 140 m (460 ft)
- Lowest elevation: 85 m (279 ft)
- Population (2023): 898
  - Density: 29.4/km^{2} (76.0/sq mi)
- Time zone: UTC+01:00 (CET)
  - Summer (DST): UTC+02:00 (CEST)
- INSEE/Postal code: 86131 /86410
- ^{1} French Land Register data, which excludes lakes, ponds, glaciers > 1 km^{2} (0.386 sq mi or 247 acres) and river estuaries.

Lhommaizé (French pronunciation: [lɔmɛze]) is a commune in the Vienne department in the Nouvelle-Aquitaine region of western France.

== See also ==
- Communes of the Vienne department
