= Notre-Dame-du-Hamel =

- Commune
- Location of Notre-Dame-du-Hamel
- Location within France Location within Normandy
- Coordinates: 48°53′11″N 0°30′23″E
- Country: France
- Region: Normandy
- Department: Eure
- Arrondissement: Bernay
- Canton: Breteuil
- Intercommunality: Intercom Bernay Terres de Normandie

Government
  - Mayor (2020–2026): Philippe Wateau
- Area^{1}: 13.58 km^{2} (5.24 sq mi)
- Elevation: 191 m (627 ft)
- Highest elevation: 239 m (784 ft)
- Lowest elevation: 177 m (581 ft)
- Population (2023): 193
  - Density: 14.2/km^{2} (36.8/sq mi)
- Time zone: UTC+01:00 (CET)
  - Summer (DST): UTC+02:00 (CEST)
- INSEE/Postal code: 27442 /27390
- ^{1} French Land Register data, which excludes lakes, ponds, glaciers > 1 km^{2} (0.386 sq mi or 247 acres) and river estuaries.

Notre-Dame-du-Hamel (French pronunciation: [nɔtʁ dam dy amɛl]) is a commune in the Eure department and Normandy region of northern France.

== Geography ==
The commune along with another 69 communes shares part of a 4,747 hectare, Natura 2000 conservation area, called Risle, Guiel, Charentonne.

== Population ==
Historical population
Year	Pop.	±% p.a.
1968	260	—
1975	217	−2.55%
1982	227	+0.65%
1990	186	−2.46%
1999	194	+0.47%
2007	209	+0.94%
2012	228	+1.76%
2017	210	−1.63%
2023	193	−1.40%
Source: INSEE

== See also ==
- Communes of the Eure department
