= Saint-Pourçain =

Saint-Pourçain may refer to several communes in France:

- Saint-Pourçain-sur-Sioule, in the Allier department
- Saint-Pourçain-sur-Besbre, in the Allier department

It may also refer to an Appellation d'origine contrôlée for wine:

- Saint-Pourçain AOC
