= Auménancourt =

- Commune
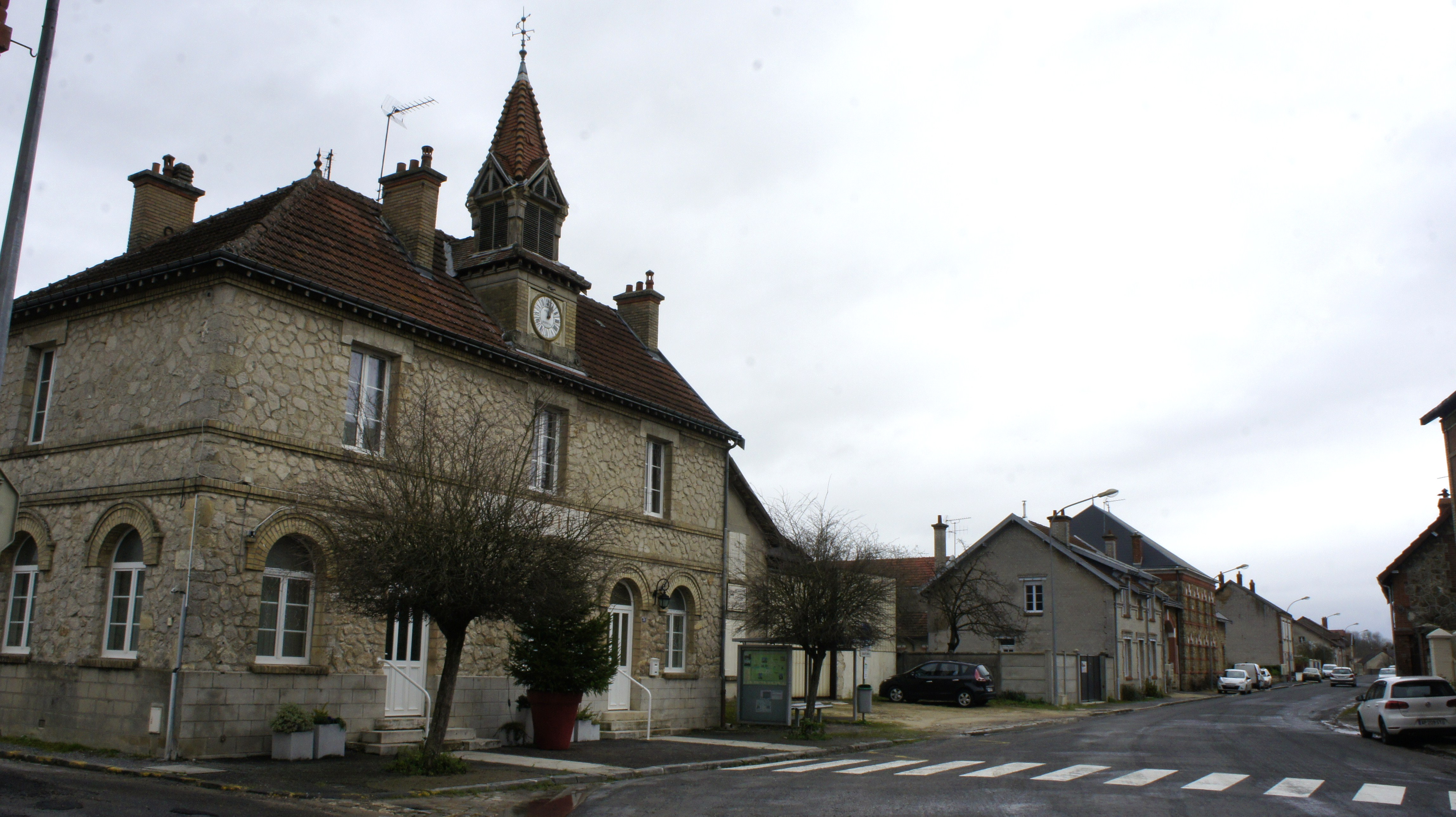
- The town hall in Auménancourt
- Location of Auménancourt
- Location within France Location within Grand Est
- Coordinates: 49°22′47″N 4°03′39″E
- Country: France
- Region: Grand Est
- Department: Marne
- Arrondissement: Reims
- Canton: Bourgogne-Fresne
- Intercommunality: CU Grand Reims

Government
  - Mayor (2020–2026): Christophe Mahuet
- Area^{1}: 12.82 km^{2} (4.95 sq mi)
- Elevation: 76 m (249 ft)
- Population (2023): 1,130
  - Density: 88.1/km^{2} (228/sq mi)
- Time zone: UTC+01:00 (CET)
  - Summer (DST): UTC+02:00 (CEST)
- INSEE/Postal code: 51025 /51110
- ^{1} French Land Register data, which excludes lakes, ponds, glaciers > 1 km^{2} (0.386 sq mi or 247 acres) and river estuaries.

Auménancourt (French pronunciation: [omenɑ̃kuʁ]) is a commune in the Marne department in northeastern France.

== Geography ==
The commune is traversed by the Suippe river.

== Population ==
Historical population
Year	Pop.	±% p.a.
1968	460	—
1975	522	+1.82%
1982	658	+3.36%
1990	659	+0.02%
1999	696	+0.61%
2007	884	+3.03%
2012	973	+1.94%
2017	1,048	+1.50%
2023	1,130	+1.26%
Source: INSEE

== See also ==
- Communes of the Marne department
