= Association départementale Isère Drac Romanche =

The Isère-Drac-Romanche Departmental Association (French: Association départementale Isère Drac Romanche) is a public administrative establishment in France formed by the Conseil d'État in 1936. Its purpose is to maintain the system of flood-risk protection in the plains of the Isère, Drac, and Romanche rivers by preserving the integrity of embankments and their associated works. The organization performs all research and labor necessary for their preservation and keeps the system under constant surveillance in order to guarantee its efficiency in protecting the land and property at stake behind the embankments.

== Reinforcement work ==
The Isère-Drac-Romanche Departmental Association performs important reinforcement work, employing techniques proper to civil engineering (embankment, pressure grouting, rockfill, gabion, sub-fluvial consolidation) and biological engineering (reinforced embankment, habitat restoration). As part of the Isère Amont and Romanche development projects, this mission now falls to SYMBHI, the Mixed Syndicate of the Hydraulic Basins of the Isère River (Syndicat Mixte des Bassins Hydrauliques de l'Isère). As new works are gradually built, the Isère-Drac-Romanche Departmental Association will assume their management. In other locations, like the regions of the downstream Isère, the Drac, and the Eau d'Olle, the association continues to perform research and work as needed.

Major projects completed by the Isère-Drac-Romanche Departmental Association

- 2004 : the Charlet river bend at Gières (Isère)
- 2004 : the Grangeage river bend at Meylan (Isère)
- 2005 : the Quai Charpenay at La Tronche (Isère)
- 2006 : the Gières loop (Isère)
- 2007 : the Croix du Plan embankment at Bourg d'Oisans (Romanche)
- 2008 : the barrier strip at the Romanche - Eau d’Olle confluence
- 2009 : a metal-frame riverbank (Isère)
- 2009 : the secured embankment at Fontaine (Drac)
- 2010 : the embankment at Lumbin (Isère)

== Members ==
The Isère-Drac-Romanche Departmental Association includes delegates from the Conseil Général de l’Isère (Isère General Council) as well as from the 68 communes and 14 landowners' unions within the protected zone.

=== The 68 communes ===
- Allemond,
- Auris-en-Oisans,
- Barraux,
- Bernin,
- Le Bourg-d'Oisans,
- Le Champ-près-Froges,
- Champ-sur-Drac,
- Champagnier,
- Chapareillan,
- Crolles,
- Domène,
- Échirolles,
- Eybens,
- Fontaine,
- Froges,
- Gières,
- Goncelin,
- Grenoble,
- Jarrie,
- La Buisse,
- La Buissière,
- La Garde,
- La Pierre,
- La Rivière,
- La Terrasse,
- La Tronche,
- L'Albenc,
- Le Cheylas,
- Le Fontanil,
- Le Touvet,
- Le Versoud,
- Livet-et-Gavet,
- Lumbin,
- Meylan,
- Moirans,
- Montchaboud,
- Montbonnot,
- Murianette,
- Notre-Dame-de-Mésage,
- Noyarey,
- Oulles,
- Oz-en-Oisans,
- Poisat,
- Polienas,
- Pont-de-Claix,
- Pontcharra,
- Sassenage,
- Seyssinet-Pariset,
- Seyssins,
- Saint-Barthélemy-de-Séchilienne,
- Saint-Vincent-de-Mercuze,
- Saint-Egrève,
- Saint-Gervais,
- Saint-Ismier,
- Saint-Jean-de-Moirans,
- Saint-Martin-d’Hères,
- Saint-Martin-le-Vinoux,
- Saint-Nazaire-les-Eymes,
- Saint-Pierre-de-Mésage,
- Saint-Quentin-sur-Isère,
- Sainte-Marie-d’Alloix,
- Tencin,
- Tullins,
- Veurey-Voroize,
- Villard-Bonnot,
- Vizille,
- Voreppe,
- Vourey.

=== The 14 unions ===
- du Bas Grésivaudan,,,,,
- de Bresson à Saint- Ismier,
- de Comboire à l’Echaillon,
- de l’Echaillon à Saint-Gervais,
- de Lancey à Gières,
- de Pique-Pierre à Roize,
- de Saint-Ismier à Grenoble,
- de Supérieure Rive Droite,
- de Supérieure Rive Gauche,
- de Tencin à Lancey
- de Voreppe à Moirans
- Romanche aval
- Drac Isère
- Syndicat Unique de l'Oisans.
