= Allevard =

- Commune
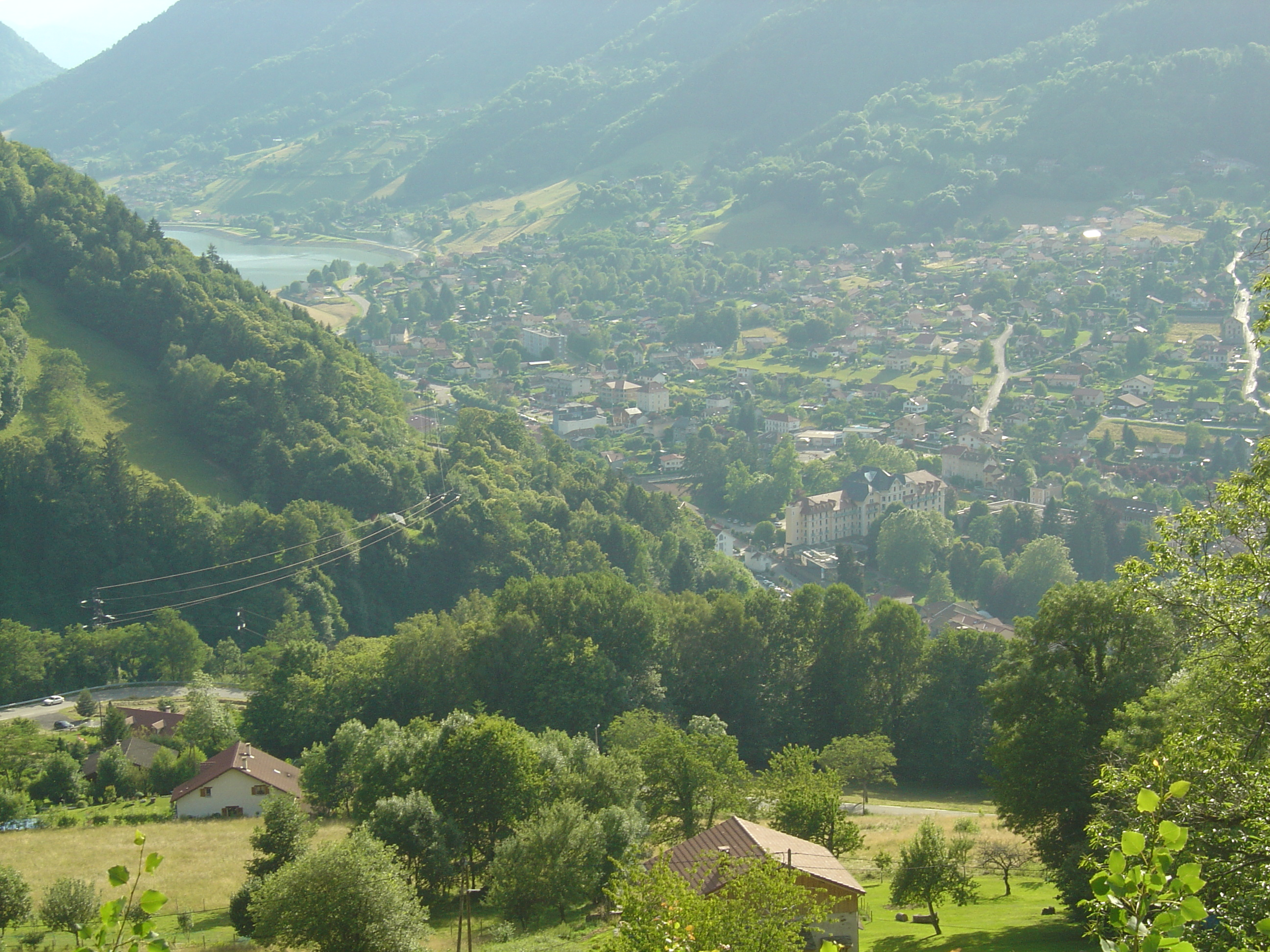
- Allevard and the lake

- Coat of arms
- Location of Allevard
- Location within France Location within Auvergne-Rhône-Alpes
- Coordinates: 45°23′40″N 6°04′29″E
- Country: France
- Region: Auvergne-Rhône-Alpes
- Department: Isère
- Arrondissement: Grenoble
- Canton: Le Haut-Grésivaudan
- Intercommunality: CC Le Grésivaudan

Government
  - Mayor (2020–2026): Sidney Rebboah
- Area^{1}: 26 km^{2} (10 sq mi)
- Highest elevation: 2,749 m (9,019 ft)
- Lowest elevation: 399 m (1,309 ft)
- Population (2023): 3,971
  - Density: 150/km^{2} (400/sq mi)
- Time zone: UTC+01:00 (CET)
  - Summer (DST): UTC+02:00 (CEST)
- INSEE/Postal code: 38006 /38580
- ^{1} French Land Register data, which excludes lakes, ponds, glaciers > 1 km^{2} (0.386 sq mi or 247 acres) and river estuaries.

Allevard (French pronunciation: [alvˈaʁ]; also known as Allevard-les-Bains) is a commune in the Isère department in the Auvergne-Rhône-Alpes region of southeastern France.

The commune has been awarded two flowers by the National Council of Towns and Villages in Bloom in the Competition of Cities and Villages in Bloom.

== Geography ==
Allevard is located in the Belledonne mountains 40 km south-east of Chambéry and 38 km north-east of Grenoble. The commune is accessed by the D525 from Goncelin in the south-west following the mountain ridge through the village and continuing north-east to La Chapelle-du-Bard. There are also some minor roads such as the D9 parallel to the D525 going to the north and the D108 which accesses the village from the D525. There is a tortuous mountain road - the D109 - which goes east of the village and eventually circles back to the north of the commune. The town has quite a large urban area in the west of the commune however the rest of the commune is mountainous and heavily forested.

The Bourg stream forms the southern boundary of the commune flowing west and the Buisson forms the northern boundary also flowing west. These streams together with numerous other streams flow into the Breda which flows north through the commune then west to join the Isère near Pontcharra.

=== Localities and hamlets ===
There are several hamlets and localities in the commune. These are:

- Les Ayettes
- Bajin
- Le Bessey
- Le Bugnon
- Clarabout
- Le Clos
- Le Closy-Jolie-Vue
- Le Colombet
- Le Colombier
- Côte Chevrets
- Cottard
- Le Crozet
- Le Cuchet
- Le David
- L'Epeluat
- L'Epinette
- Le Glapigneux
- Grange Merle
- Grange Neuve
- Le Guillet
- Le Jeu de Paume
- Montouvrard
- La Morarde
- Moret
- L'Oursière
- Les Panissières
- Les Perrières
- Pommier
- La Ratz
- Le Replat
- La Retourdière
- La Ronzière
- La Tour du Treuil
- Vaugraine

== History ==
=== Heraldry ===
Arms of Allevard	The coat of arms is derived from the arms of François de Barral, ironmaster and lord of the country in the 17th century. They come from the Chambarran family who were gentlemen glassmakers from the distaff side of the noble Barral family. The bells refer to the three parishes were under their jurisdiction. The "old" Barral family who were the lords of the Tower of Treuil wore "Or, 3 barrels in sable". Blazon: Gules, three bends argent, in chief the same charged with 3 bells azure with clappers of Or.

=== The Middle Ages to modern times ===
Allevard Castle stood above the town on a hill surrounded by a wall 60 toises long and described: "and water flowed from the Breyda and partly from the Sabaudie". The village was also fortified. Its enclosure was 1413 toises accessible through four doors. It was first mentioned in 1100. A large house on the edge of town, near Vingtain and the mill canals in 1367. A quoted recollection: "meniis Curtina et clausura".

It also noted "quaddam hospitium seu fortalicium sum et domum fortem que situatur infra villam de alarvardo" in 1367 about an ancient tower and fortified house belonging to Guillaume Barral which connected the ditches of the city in 1393

In the Middle Ages Allevard was the seat of a lordship. The survey of 1339 reported the existence of a large house in a place called the "Bâtie d'Arvillard": "Castrum Bastide alti villaris" (ADI B 4443, folio 14). Located on a mound dominating the Allevard valley for 100 m, the site is naturally protected on three sides by cliffs. On the accessible side a hummock bars the way. The survey states: "Dictum autem castrum situatum est in quodam altissimo molare valde eminente et deffensabile"(the castle is located on a very high mound with a great height and easy to defend). The lords gave the people of Allevard many exemptions successively modified by the franchise charter from the university in 1315 and in 1337. Until 1558 these charters were, depending on the financial needs of the crown, more or less respected by the kings of France. In 1558 Henry II committed to sell, subject to possible repurchase, the land of Allevard. In 1644, the "Engagiste" Lord of Allevard was called Thomas Chabo of Saint Maurice, a Savoyard noble. His son, Charles, was Ambassador of Savoy to the Court of Versailles. Charles subrogated the sale to François de Barral (1625–1699) who was advisor to the Parliament of the Dauphiné - the son of Gaspard, a lawyer and adviser to the Queen mother and to Mary Vignon, and the wife of François de Bonne, Constable of France. Gaspard de Barral already owned a steel mill near Renage and iron mines on the mountain of Saint-Pierre d'Allevard.

=== The Barral family era ===
The Barral family were influential and powerful as they were related to the Ponat, Virieu, and Tencin families who were richly established in Voironnais and Saint-Aupre. Under François Barral de Clermont (1625–1699) major work was undertaken in the small and very unhealthy walled town of Allevard: "The people are piled up in old unhealthy houses and without comfort or usual support. The streets are unpaved, narrow, and winding with mud kept wet with the dampness which favoured epidemics and the emergence or persistence of goiter" (Bouffier 1846). The construction of the first stone bridge dates from 1688 and the renovation of the old church plus the redevelopment of the former castle were completed between 1692 and 1693. The first opening in the south wall of the city followed. François de Barral de Clermont, the uncle of the Tencin died in 1699 as the Dean of the Parliament of Grenoble.

In 1751 the King established the territory of Allevard under his command under the name of the County of Barral as a perpetual lordship for Jean-Baptiste de Barral (1709–1785).

Paulin de Barral 17 (1745–1822), his grandson, was the last lord of Allevard and of Jaligny in Bourbonnais who sold at a loss his castle and his factories in 1817 to A.B. Champel AB.

=== The iron industry ===
Allevard was an important centre for metallurgy and for the quality of its steel products until the early 20th century. There is a legend, created from the text of Suetonius and Polybius, which claims that Hannibal went to Allevard to manufacture his weapons. The history of Allevard is closely linked to the alpine steel industry. In 1450, Pierre and Arthur Boisson had a trip hammer in Allevard town which still existed in 1724. During a tour of the factory by special commissioners of the king in 1724 "it was determined to be the oldest of its kind in the kingdom" (E. Chabrand). Another Trip hammer at the same era was in operation in the village of Pinsot which is upstream on the Breda. A study of the remains indicated that the Allevard community had, between 1643 and 1727, a total of 76 works on the "Bredal" stream: 3 blast furnaces, 21 Trip hammers, 36 flour mills, 2 hemp beaters, 6 presses, 6 water-powered saws, 1 nail factory, and 1 fuller's earth plant. The steel industry was highly profitable because at the same time, the price per hundred kilos for the melting furnace - total production in Allevard was 54,255 kg - went from 4 livres 5 sols to 9 livres 10 sols.

For many years Allevard remained an industrial site of great importance under as the blacksmith lords of the Barral family who constantly sought to innovate with the advice of the engineer Binelli and Sir Pierre Clement Grignon, collaborator in the Encyclopédie of Diderot. In 1785, the Barral establishments employed around 300 foundrymen, 300 miners, and 200 colliers to which should be added 100 mule-drivers. Of these 900 workers, only 420 were directly employed by the factory. Others worked independently particularly the miners and colliers.

Shortly before the Revolution a major project to relocate the Royal Naval cannon foundry of Saint-Gervais in the valley of the Isere to Allevard was considered. Only the relative weakness in the supply of charcoal put off the government – there needed to be 36,000 loads of coal per year when all the Allevard and nearby Gresivaudan communities could provide was at most 15,000. The plant therefore became idle under the casual management of Paulin Barral, then of Messrs Champel – who received the Duchess of Berry in Allevard in 1829, then Giroud who were bankers and were soon bankrupted.

Fortunately in the 1840s, under the leadership of Eugène Charrière, production of the factories near Rives, which had been devoted only to cast iron, changed to puddled steel with which the forges could get the wholesale railway market for steel tyres, first welded, then the seamless tyres developed by engineer A. Pinat. In 1867 steel production was 2,000 tonnes. At that time forges had a staff of 446 workers of which 80 were metal rollers. The customers were then 400 companies almost all French (Thiers, Saint-Etienne etc.) which increased to 1,300 customers in 1906 with a workforce of over 700 workers and a large increase in exports: Austria-Hungary, Germany, Belgium, and Italy. Allevard also partnered with some great groups just before the First World War (Firminy, Aulnoye, Batignolles, Commentary).

It was also at Allevard that in 1859 some of the first armourplating for the frigate La Gloire were produced together with the companies Petetin de Saint Chamond and Laubenière of Rouen.

After the abandonment of cast iron from charcoal the forges converted to the Siemens process to manufacture steel, conserving for Allevard at the turn of the century: "their name and their place in the metallurgic world, to the satisfaction our dauphinois pride and for the benefit of our courageous working population" (Chabrand). At this time Allevard also had a silk factory employing a large female workforce - an establishment led by the Izoard family who were related to Aimé Bouchayer an industrialist and banker from Grenoble who quickly developed a major centre of tourism based on hydrotherapy.

=== Contemporary era ===
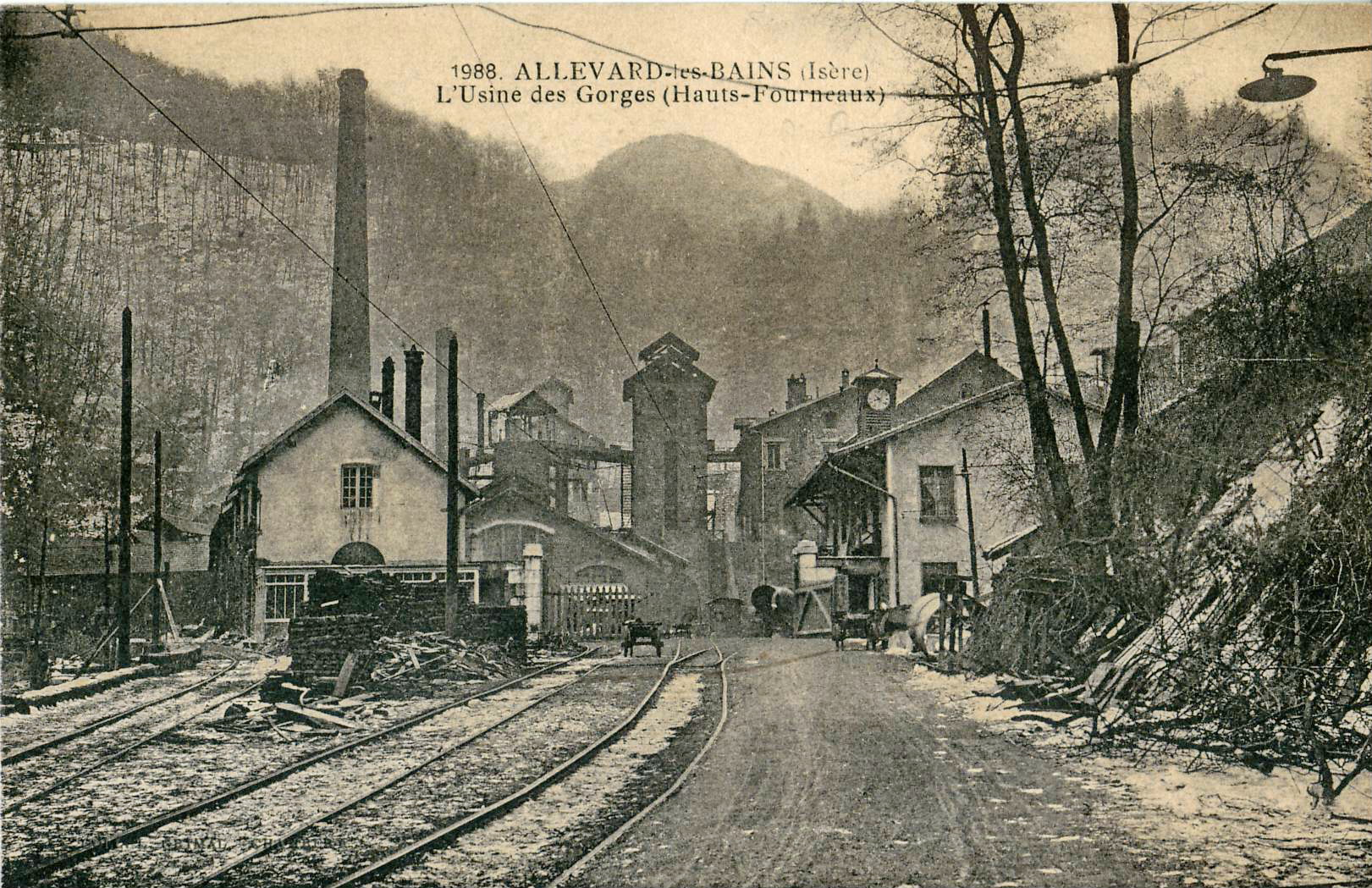
Old postcard showing the entrance to the Forges, served by the industrial railway as the beginning of the 20th century

The forges

Succeeding his father and his grandfather, Charles Pinat was the new ironmaster for Allevard at the turn of the century and former motive power engineer on the tramway of Lyon and ahead of his time directed the energy supply for his establishments from power generation through falls, dams, and power plants he planned to build along the course of the Breda. In 1917, during the First World War, the Allevard forges passed into the control of the Compagnie des forges et aciéries de la marine et d'Homécourt (Company of marine forges and steelworks and of Homécourt) (FAMH) under the guidance of Théodore Laurent. It was a time of great innovation - new hydro-electric developments on the Breda and concentration of production around springs, magnets, and ferro-alloys. The 1930 crisis significantly affected Allevard and severely restricted its production. In 1940, the defeat and catastrophic floods in the upper valley of Breda and even stopped all production for some time. Liberation marked the renewal of machinery (10,000 tons / year of rolled products) and a steady influx of immigrant workers on three industrial sites: The Gorge of Allevard - Champ Sappey, Saint-Pierre-d'Allevard, and Le Cheylas. Subsequent years would see the adoption of continuous casting and the unfortunate association with Ugine for the manufacture of magnets. In 1973-1974 the completion of the power station of Moulins marked paradoxically the end of the forges from their home since the 15th century.

Nowadays, the development of the silicon industry and its derivatives near Grenoble has led to a growth of urbanism which imposes by its sprawl major changes in the landscape of the commune with other parts affected by agricultural abandonment and extensions of the forest.

=== Spa ===
Very early on famous people resided in Allevard to take the waters (for drinking or inhaling in common rooms) such as Alphonse Daudet (who took up three chapters of his novel, Numa Roumestan), Henri-Frédéric Amiel, Frédéric Ozanam, Henri d'Orléans, Duke of Aumale (son of Louis-Philippe from the family of Lucien Bonaparte and Queen Ranavalona III of Madagascar during his exile in France).

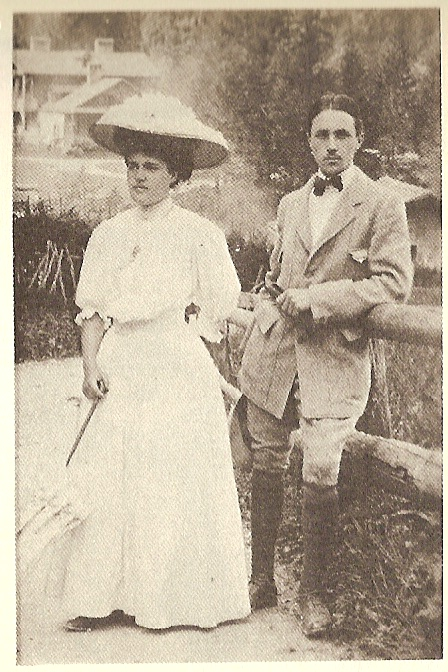
Pierre Vellones and his sister at Allevard, 1909

The greatest customers of Allevard, however, since 1880 have been the politicians, preachers, speakers, and singers who come to "fix their voice". These include, among others, the actors Paul Mounet and Jean Mounet-Sully, the brothers Coquelin the elder and the younger, Félia Litvinne, Germaine Lubin, Georgette Leblanc; then later Jeanne Aubert, Cécile Sorel, and Damia who were singers; politicians such as Eugène Chevandier de Valdrôme, Eugène Rouher, Charles Floquet, Édouard Herriot, Georges Picot (who died in 1909 at Allevard), Gustave Hervé, Alexandre Zévaès, Auguste Burdeau, and Senator Auguste Scheurer-Kestner in 1897 in the middle of the Dreyfus affair. There were also many other notable people: clerics such as Father Della Chiesa - the future Pope Benedict XV, Monseigneur Félix Dupanloup (Bishop of Orléans), the Genevan pastor Theodore Claparede, and the chief rabbi of France Isaïe Schwartz; preachers such as Joseph Gratry of the French Academy, and Father Jean-Léon Le Prevost; diplomats such as Camille Barrere, Count Vladimir Lamsdorf, Prince Pierre Wolkonsky, Count Zichy, and Prince Ypsilanti, the Roumanian mountaineer Prince Alexandre Bibesco; musicians such as Jules Massenet and Charles Lamoureux; photographers such as Nadar and the Lumière brothers; poets such as Lucie Delarue-Mardrus and Patrice de La Tour du Pin; musicologists such as Paul-Marie Masson and Émile Vuillermoz; painters such as Hippolyte Flandrin and Kees van Dongen; the novelists Germaine Acremant and Thyde Monnier; French academicians such as Victor de Laprade and René de La Croix de Castries; professors of medicine Louis Landouzy and Maxime Laignel-Lavastine; industrialists and financiers such as Pierre Dreyfus, Edward Molyneux, and Calouste Gulbenkian; Swiss bankers Pictet and Mornay; the chemist Joseph Bienaimé Caventou; the feminist Arria Ly who worked at the local newspaper, Chronicle of Allevard-les-Bains led by Dr. Boel in 1903, Dr. Edmond Locard (a nephew of Dr. Niepce the Director of the Spa); the cartoonist Jacques Faizant; the architect Henri Révoil; President Ferhat Abbas, the family of President Habib Bourguiba, and Admiral Muselier are among other celebrities who have been regulars of the spa.

The Spa is effective, discreet, and popular with entertainers - "Coming here is not for show but to heal and rest" (Dr. Revillet-Laure). Since 1936 Allevard has been visited by other clients thanks in particular to ENT and lung treatments for children which was initiated by Dr. Jean Langénieux.

Finally, it was in 1994 that a new spa building opened for the care and cure of rheumatology which revived the first indications in 1838 by Dr. Laurent Chataing, the first inspector of waters. Since then, the station has sought to open proposed new anti-stress treatments and also treatments for fibromyalgia.

== Administration ==
List of Successive Mayors

Mayors from the French Revolution to 1935

From	To	Name	Party	Position
1790	1791	Nicholas Gauthier		Notary
1791	1828	Laurent Dufresne		Notary
1828	1830	André Benoit Champel		Ironmaster
1830	1831	Laurent Chataing		Doctor
1831	1836	Antoine Auguste Guerre		Notary
1836	1848	Hugues Barbas		Landlord
1848	1852	André Auguste Pra		Notary
1852	1854	Nicholas Louis Dufresne		Notary
1854	1867	Séraphin Bouffier		Industrialist
1867	1870	André Auguste Pra		Notary
1870	1871	Jean Benoît Emery		
1871	1872	Fortuné Authier		
1872	1873	Jean Benoît Emery		
1873	1878	Alexandre Dufresne		Notary
1878	1880	François Auguste Davallet		
1880	1881	André Auguste Pra		Notary
1881	1888	François Auguste Davallet		
1888	1892	François Martinet		
1892	1898	François Auguste Davallet		
1898	1907	Amédée Piattet		
1907	1930	Louis Gerin		
1930	1935	Albert Salvain		

Mayors from 1935

From	To	Name	Party	Position
1935	1941	Marcel Dumas	Rad-Soc	Carrier
1941	1944	Jean Langénieux		Doctor
1944	1944	Alfred Couronné		Upoholsterer
1944	1964	Marcel Dumas	Rad-Soc	Carrier, VP of the General Council
1964	1983	Joseph Casserra		Butcher
1983	1989	Philippe Bouffard		Doctor
1989	2020	Philippe Langenieux-Villard	RPR/UMP/DVD	Regional councillor, MP, then General Councillor
2020	2026	Sidney Rebboah		

=== Twinning ===
Allevard has twinning associations with:

- Menaggio (Italy) since 1991.

== Demography ==
The inhabitants of the commune are known as Allevardins or Allevardines or alternatively as Allevardais or Allevardaises in French.

Historical population

Year	Pop.	±% p.a.
1793	2,281	—
1800	2,056	−1.47%
1806	2,258	+1.57%
1821	2,455	+0.56%
1831	2,690	+0.92%
1836	2,599	−0.69%
1841	2,638	+0.30%
1846	2,128	−4.21%
1851	2,638	+4.39%
1856	2,846	+1.53%
1861	3,180	+2.24%
1866	3,110	−0.44%
1872	3,031	−0.43%
1876	3,054	+0.19%
1881	3,195	+0.91%
1886	3,085	−0.70%
1891	2,850	−1.57%
1896	2,726	−0.89%
1901	2,546	−1.36%

Year	Pop.	±% p.a.
1906	2,560	+0.11%
1911	2,715	+1.18%
1921	2,577	−0.52%
1926	2,514	−0.49%
1931	2,571	+0.45%
1936	2,601	+0.23%
1946	2,538	−0.24%
1954	2,515	−0.11%
1962	2,384	−0.67%
1968	2,478	+0.65%
1975	2,565	+0.49%
1982	2,391	−1.00%
1990	2,558	+0.85%
1999	3,081	+2.09%
2007	3,824	+2.74%
2012	3,881	+0.30%
2017	4,102	+1.11%
2023	3,971	−0.54%

Source: EHESS and INSEE

== Transport ==
The town of Allevard is served by the 6200 route of the departmental network called Transisère. It is also served by several bus routes by Gresivaudan with links including the Lycée Pierre Terrail (Pierre Terrail School) to Pontcharra and also to Goncelin railway station with timings corresponding with the TER network to the cities of Grenoble and Chambéry.

== Sites and monuments ==
=== Civil heritage ===
- The Tower of Treuil (11th and 12th century) is a restored private property and former stronghold of the first family of Barral in the 13th century.
- The Château de Barral (18th century) and its park has specimens of redwood and cedar trees. This castle was rebuilt by Paulin de Barral over an old house belonging to the notary Gautier du Replat with "the walls lasting to hear salacious talk" (A. Bougy 1838). It housed a collection of erotic paintings until 1820 "comparable to that of Maurice de Saxe". It replaced the old Morard de Monts Castle (in Louis XIII style) which was known for its fountains and waterfalls. It was located on the edge of the current Joseph de Barral park. It was destroyed to be sold as "building materials" at the request of Monseigneur Claude Mathias Barral, Bishop of Troyes, who was ruined by his prodigalities during the exile of the parliament of Paris in his episcopal city.
- A Tomb in the cemetery in the form of a pyramid-shaped chapel topped by a statue of Saint Stephen built by the Croüy-Chanel family who claimed to descend from the kings of Hungary (now transformed into a columbarium).
- The Spas and the Thermal Park: the whole is a unique example in France of "grammar of styles for bathing establishments". Conch shell-shaped and dominated by the Hotel Splendid, it was designed by Parisian architect Masson (1909) as a metallic framed structure (Gustave Eiffel). The park includes:
  - The Niepce Spa designed by the Norman architect Jory at the end the 19th century;
  - The former Casino has a rotunda decorated with corbels in bas-relief (1925);
  - The Chardon Spa soon to be labelled "Heritage of the 20th century", built by the architect Jocteur Monrozier (1960) and supervised by the architect Albert Laprade: it houses a fresco by Françoise Boudet (1925-2012) who won first Grand Prix de Rome (1950) and prizewinner from the Casa de Velázquez (1956);
  - The Villiot Rheumatology Spa (1994) designed by Roche, an architect from Chambéry decorated with ceramics by Roger Capron.
- A walk "through the maze of small streets in the centre of the town" (A. Daudet) gives the tourist the impression of being inside the walls of a fortified city. The facades at the entrance to some houses have groupings of windows which indicate former properties of the forges of Allevard.
- The Allevard Museum
- The House of Forges and Mills at Pinsot

=== Industrial heritage ===
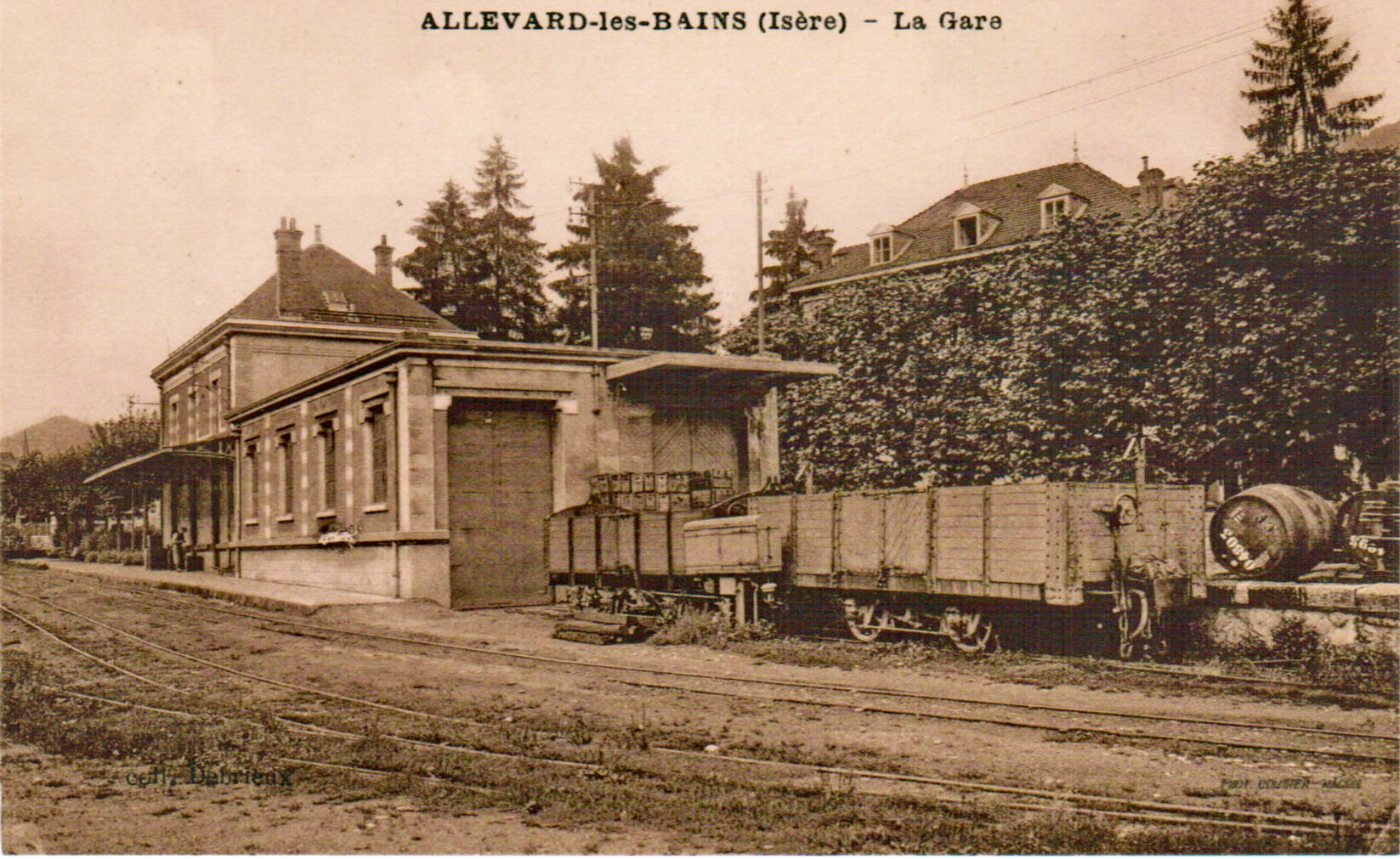
The old tramway station of Pontcharra

- Forges: There are no more buildings from the modern era existing in Allevard commune. The factory moved its last production to Le Cheylas in the Isère valley between 1964 and 1974 but there are still remnants of older mines on the iron way and the remains of a grill oven at Saint-Pierre-d'Allevard
- Sawmills: Many mills driven by water power have disappeared, however there are still some remnants along the banks of streams and canals. Similarly the Trip hammers have all disappeared except for the Oursière (inlet canal is blocked and the wheel gone but the workshop and forge are still standing) and also the forges of Breda (Clérin and Gremen) has been saved and reassembled in working order at the Museum of forges and mills in Pinsot.

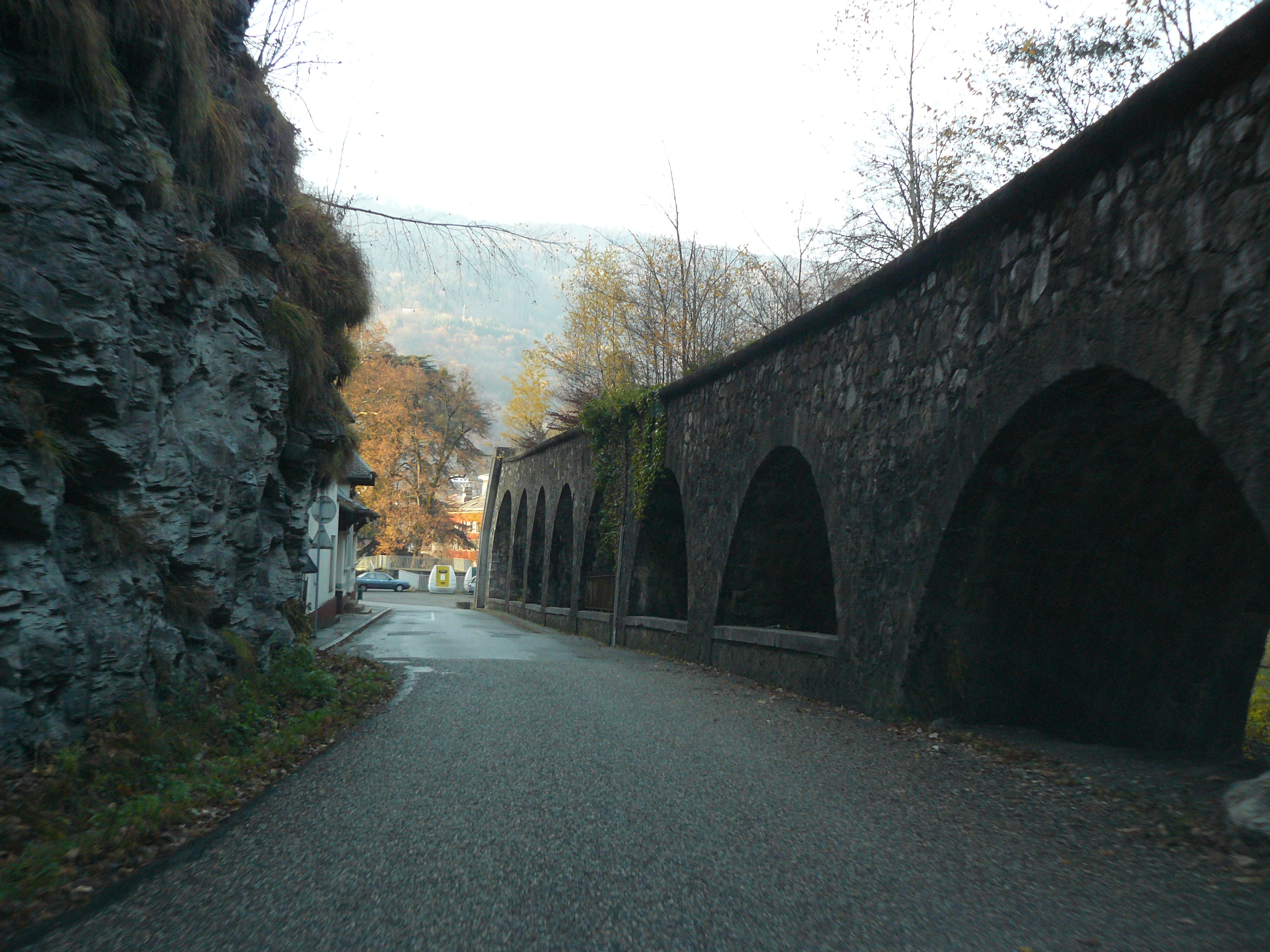
Railway Viaduct in Allevard

- The railway: There remains some vestiges of the railway in the commune:
  - An old viaduct from the Allevard Forges Railway which connected the plant to the mines of Saint-Pierre-d'Allevard and Le Cheylas station, colloquially called le Tacot (the Jalopy) which was open until 1968.
  - An old railway station from the Pontcharra to la Rochette and Allevard Tramway (PLA). A terminus for a narrow gauge line between Isère and Savoy was considered after the annexation of Savoy in 1861 but was commissioned very late (1901) and abandoned 50 years later.

=== Religious heritage ===
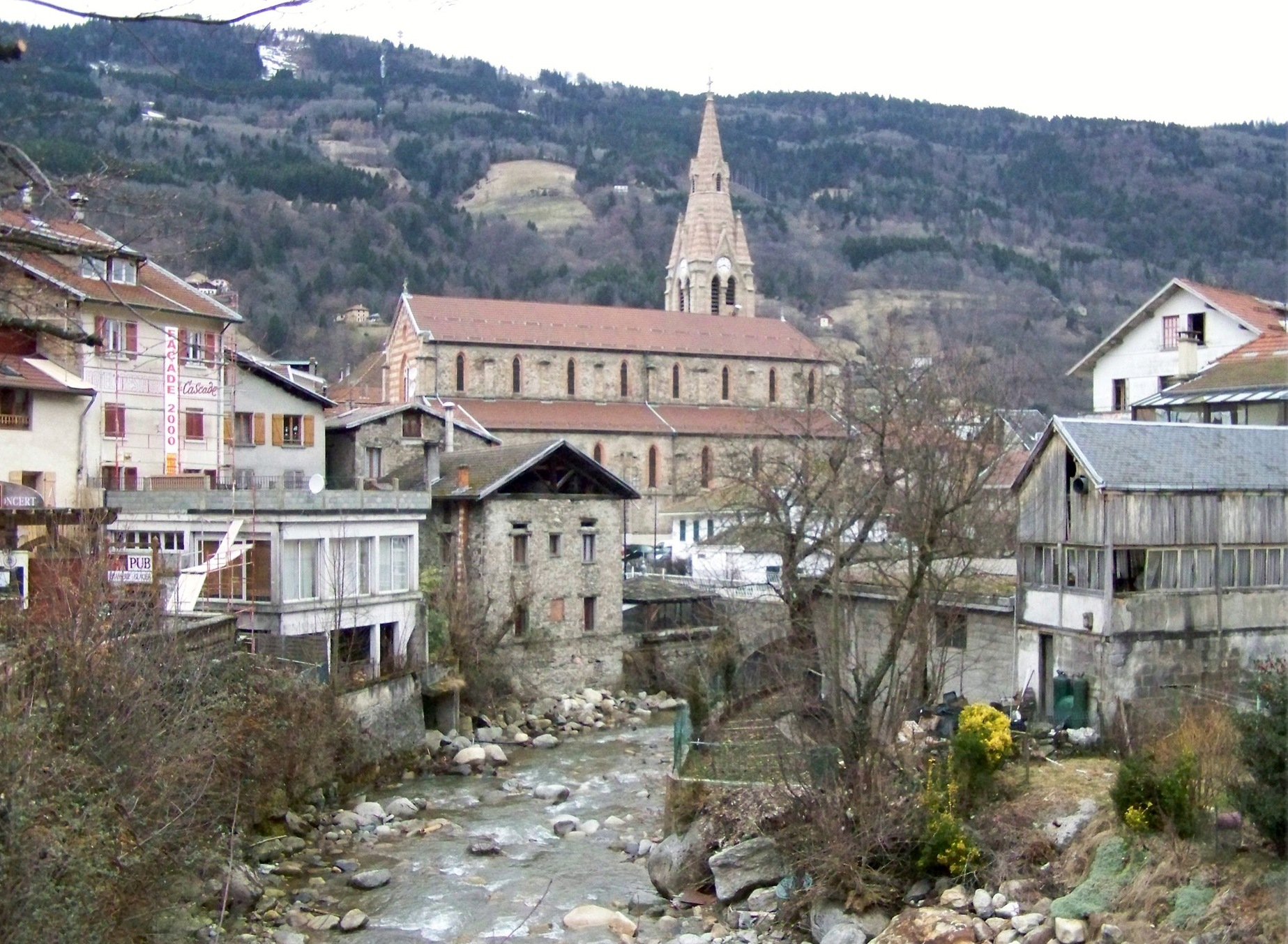
View of the church

- The Saint-Marcel Church (19th century) has a Pipe organ built by the organ builder Aristide Cavaillé-Coll. The altar of Saint Eloi was made by Allevard blacksmiths in the 19th century. Facing the porch of the church on the left there is a very interesting vertical Noon mark
- The Saint Joseph Chapel (next to the cemetery) has a procession of artisans with the statue for the feast of Saint Joseph.
- The Protestant Church of the Reformed Church of France (historical Protestantism, Calvinist, Huguenot). Opened on 25 June 1854. Located at 12 Place du Temple 38580 Allevard.

== Activities ==
=== Thermal cures ===
The first sulphur thermal spa treatments took place in 1813 but especially since 1848 under the tutelage of Dr. Bernard Niepce, the inspector of waters. The baths were operated originally by Pierre Villiot and the Bouvret-Rocour family and associates then from 1882 by the Compagnie Générale des Eaux minérales et Bains de Mer until it was redeemed in 1997 by the municipality and operated by SAEM Thermal. The operation runs today in a forested park surrounded by three thermal establishments with typical architecture from the 1890s until 1995. The Niepce building (1894) houses the "breathing" activities, the Villiot building (1992) receives patients with rheumatology; the Chardon building (1955) does not currently have thermal use.

- Rheumatology and musculo-skeletal trauma
- Respiratory (ORL)

=== Winter sports resort ===
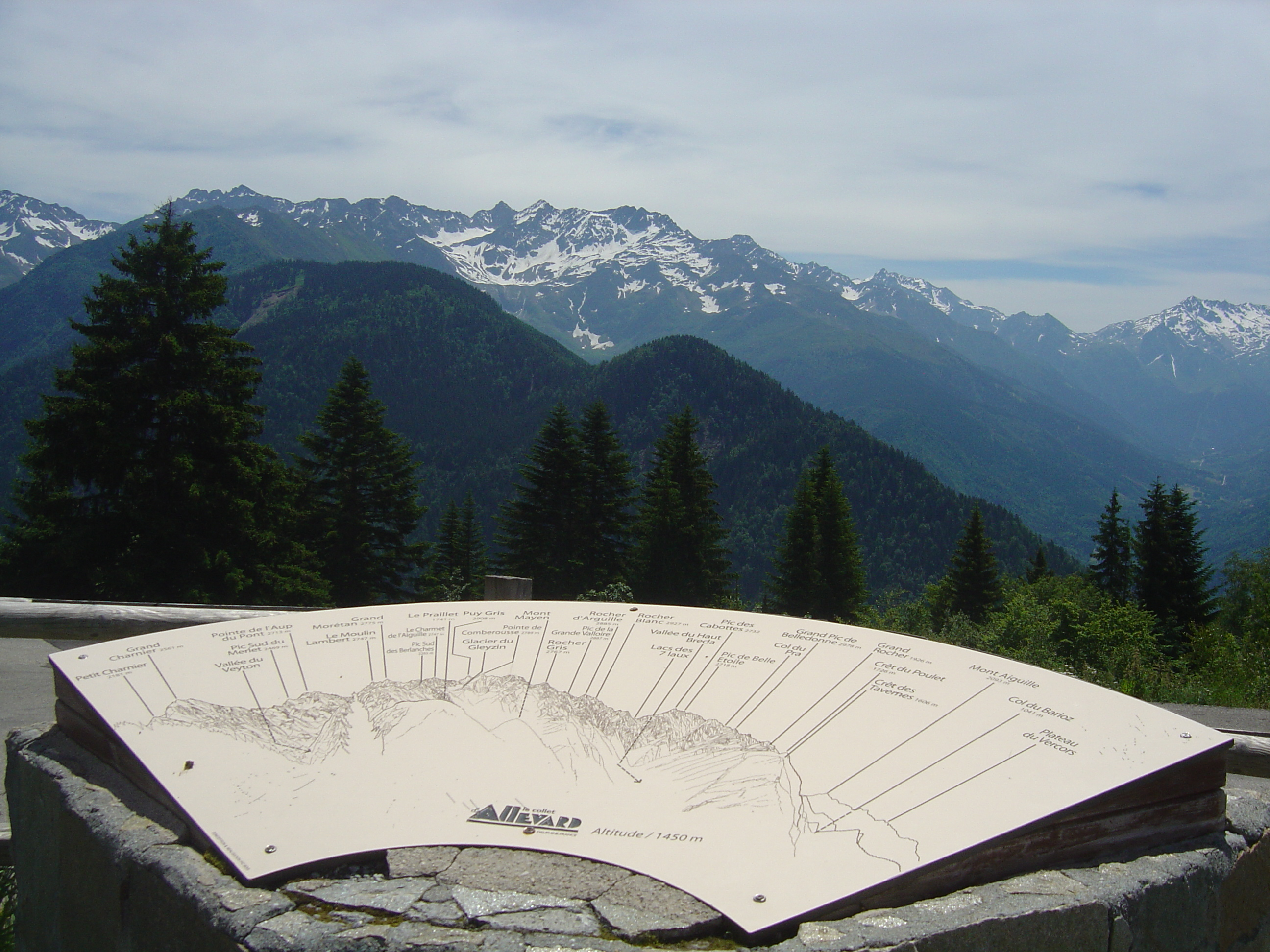
View from the Collet d'Allevard

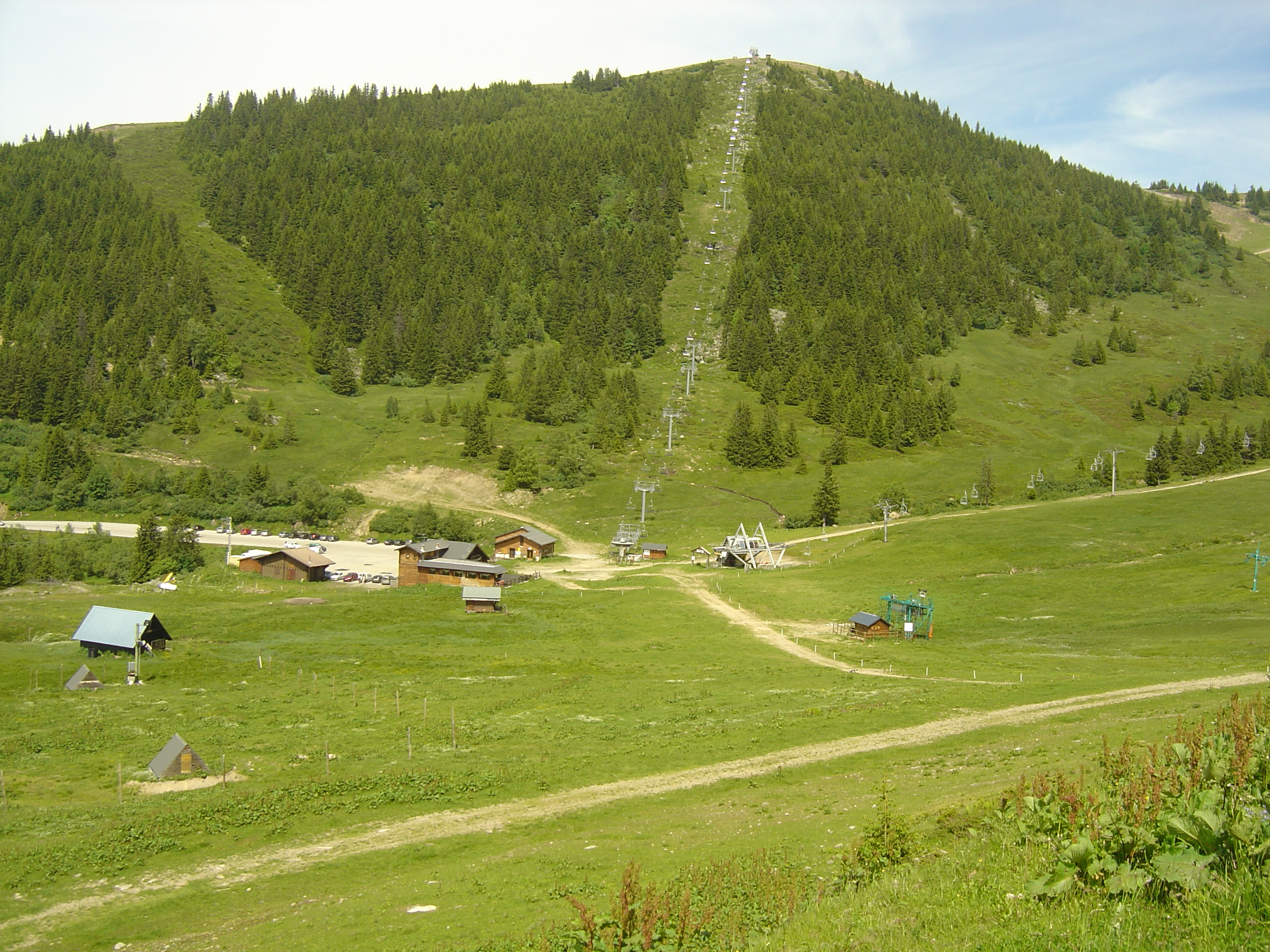
The Super Collet station (1,638m) in summer

The commune has a ski resort: Le Collet d'Allevard which is located 10 km from the town (30 minutes drive). The altitude of the runs varies from 1,450m to 2,100m. The resort has 35 km of runs: 7 green, 6 blue, 5 red, and 3 black.

Created in 1955 on former communal grazing land reserved for summer pastures for the collective herds of the Allevard community, it is now served by a new route via the route of the old logging road across private land and the old royal delphinale forest. It reached its present size in 1975 and subsequent developments have primarily been to improve the existing domain.

Interesting features for those who go there:

- its position on a balcony which allows 360° view including Mont Blanc to the north-east and Mont Aiguille to the south.
- four very different sectors (orientation, vegetation, altitude):
  - Malatrait (SW, 1450m-1750m)
  - Fontaineterre (NNW, valley, 1500m - 1750m)
  - Prérond (N, 1550m - 2000m)
  - Le Super Collet / les Plagnes (S/NW, 1550m - 2100m)

Current equipment:

- 2 Chairlifts 4-seater and embarking pads SKIRAIL brand (Les Tufs in 2002, le Grand Collet in 2005)
- 1 Chairlift of 4-seater POMA brand (Grand Paul in 1987)
- 1 Chairlift 3-seater POMA brand (Les Plagnes in 1975)
- 4 Platter lifts with detachable poles with POMA and MONTAZ brands (The Lakes I & II 1975-1976, Sun 1981 Prérond 2006)
- 1 Platter lift with fixed poles DOPPELMAYR brand (Marmot 2006)
- 2 Platter lifts for children with POMA brand (Toddlers in 2004 and Malatrait in 20?)
- 1 treadmill (Tapetto 2005)

Another feature is that Collet d'Allevard is a first class paragliding site especially with its four official take-off points (Malatrait, Clos des Gentianes, Prérond, and Plagnes) each with different orientation.

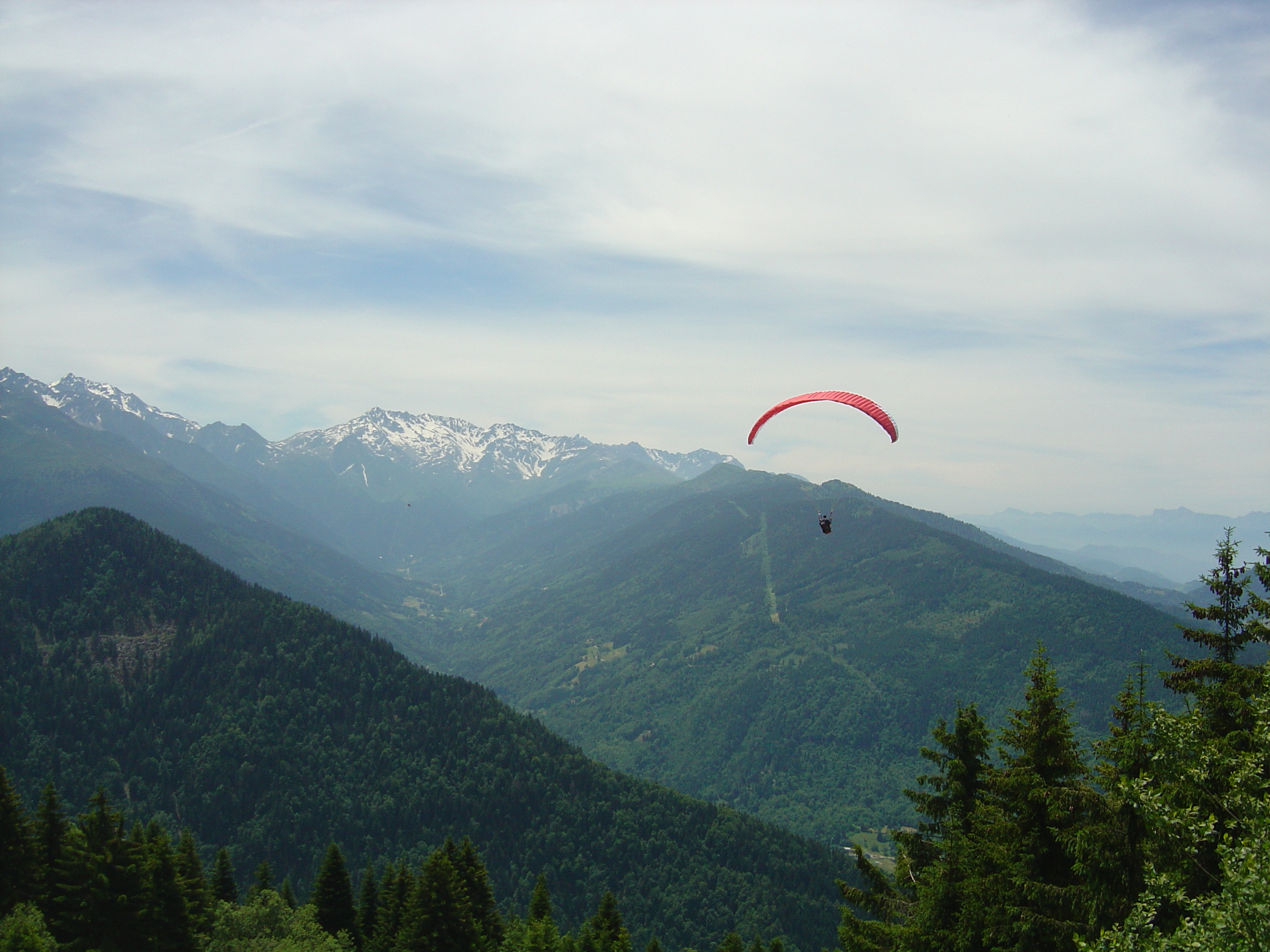
Paragliding at Clos des Gentianes

Finally Collet d'Allevard offers one of the largest night ski areas in Europe covering the Malatrait and Fontaineterre sectors.

=== Casino ===
In accordance with the law of 1907 on casinos and gambling halls, the municipality of Allevard allowed the opening of a facility in May 1909. A company called "du Casino d'Allevard les Bains" was formed at that time for its operation. In 1925 the architect Guénard carried out a complete overhaul of the building and its original decoration. The guests can find all the classic fun of this kind of establishment (boule, roulette, baccarat and small theatre). The new Allevard casino opened in 1994 and changed ownership in 2000.

=== Sports ===
TTG (Grésivaudan Table Tennis Club), a table tennis club for the communes of Le Touvet, Allevard, La Terrasse, and Lumbin.

=== Local event ===
Saint-Michel market - once a fair

Held on the nearest Thursday to 29 September, the date is linked to that of the descent from alpine pastures giving rise to a large festival day where the cows were decorated with leaves, wild flowers, and branches. "At Saint-Michel the Allevardins pay their debts" to notaries who, on that day, officiate outside the doors of the inns. Those who could not fulfill them had an additional period of one month to finalise the debt (the "Return of Saint-Michel") before entering. The traditional dish always served in all restaurants on this occasion is the calf's head. "Allevard had the reputation of being a land of plenty. Foreigners were received with open arms and without ostentation. No party, no meeting had a place without dancing. The violins come out from the neighborhood and on special occasions from Grenoble ... Once a violin appears in Allevard people gathered in the house where it is received. Each brought his supper" (Bouffier 1846).

== Notable people linked to the commune ==
- Étienne Albrieux (1891-1962), painter.
- Paulin de Barral, a libertine who was used as a model for the character of Valmont in Les Liaisons dangereuses by his cousin Pierre Choderlos de Laclos.
- Jean Béranger, skier, husband of Christine Goitschel, from the hamlet of Montouvrard and former coach of the French team
- Jean Guerre Dumolard, lawyer and politician, writer from Lyon, born in Allevard.
- Estelle Dubeuf, wife of Fornier, born in 1797, daughter of the forge director Paulin de Barral and granddaughter of the Allevardin notary Nicolas Gautier du Replat was the first and last love of Hector Berlioz.
- Bernard Niepce, doctor, cousin of Nicéphore Niépce, inspector of waters of Allevard and inventor of cold inhalations, between 1848 and 1882.
- Eugene Charrière (1805-1885), ironmaster, developed the manufacture of steel for the railways and the Navy at Allevard.
- Olivier Billaz, born in Allevard in 1856, Student of the Ecole Normale, associate of letters, collaborator with Jean Jaurès, leader of the "People's University", a professor at the Lycée Charlemagne and the Lycée Buffon in Paris, collaborator with Ferdinand Brunot of the Society of Friends of modern education, historian of the Allevard region, author of In Allevard, a descriptive and historical essay on a canton of the French Alps (1907).
- Léon-Camille Mähl (1859-1936) engineer, designer of hydroelectric equipment of the Rhône (Génissiat)
- Monseigneur Charles Cotton, pastor-archpriest of Allevard promoted in 1875 to the episcopal see of Valencia, very hostile prelate to the laws of Jules Ferry.
- Father Auguste Milliat, born in 1862 in Allevard, poet, teacher and Catholic writer.
- Lily Fayol, variety artiste, singer, was born in Allevard on 12 June 1914.
- Pierre Rambaud, sculptor and painter.

== See also ==
- Communes of the Isère department
- Cantons of the Isère department
- Arrondissements of the Isère department

=== Bibliography ===
- Élisabeth Sirot, Noble and Fortified House - The lordly habitat in the medieval countryside from the middle of the 12th century to the beginning of the 16th century, Editions Picard, 2007, ISBN 9782708407701 (in French).
