= Sainte-Marie-du-Mont =

Sainte-Marie-du-Mont may refer to the following communes in France:

- Sainte-Marie-du-Mont, Isère, in the Isère département
- Sainte-Marie-du-Mont, Manche, in the Manche département
