= Communauté de communes Le Grésivaudan =

Federation of municipalities in France

Le Grésivaudan
- Communauté de communes
- Interactive map of Le Grésivaudan
- Coordinates: 45°19′N 05°58′E
- Country: France
- Region: Auvergne-Rhône-Alpes
- Department: Isère
- No. of communes: {{{nbcomm}}}
- Established: 2009
- Area: 676.7 km^{2} (261.3 sq mi)
- Population (2018): 101,729
  - Density: 150.3/km^{2} (389.4/sq mi)
- Website: www.le-gresivaudan.fr

The Communauté de communes Le Grésivaudan is a communauté de communes in the Isère département and in the Auvergne-Rhône-Alpes région of France. It was formed on 1 January 2009 by the merger of several former communautés de communes. Its seat is in Crolles. Its area is 676.7 km^{2}, and its population was 101,729 in 2018.

== Communes ==
The Communauté de communes consists of the following 43 communes:

1. Les Adrets
2. Allevard
3. Barraux
4. Bernin
5. Biviers
6. La Buissière
7. Chamrousse
8. Chapareillan
9. Le Champ-près-Froges
10. La Chapelle-du-Bard
11. Le Cheylas
12. La Combe-de-Lancey
13. Crêts-en-Belledonne
14. Crolles
15. La Flachère
16. Froges
17. Goncelin
18. Le Haut-Bréda
19. Hurtières
20. Laval-en-Belledonne
21. Lumbin
22. Montbonnot-Saint-Martin
23. Le Moutaret
24. La Pierre
25. Plateau-des-Petites-Roches
26. Pontcharra
27. Revel
28. Sainte-Agnès
29. Sainte-Marie-d'Alloix
30. Sainte-Marie-du-Mont
31. Saint-Ismier
32. Saint-Jean-le-Vieux
33. Saint-Martin-d'Uriage
34. Saint-Maximin
35. Saint-Mury-Monteymond
36. Saint-Nazaire-les-Eymes
37. Saint-Vincent-de-Mercuze
38. Tencin
39. La Terrasse
40. Theys
41. Le Touvet
42. Le Versoud
43. Villard-Bonnot
