= La Chapelle-du-Bard =

- Commune
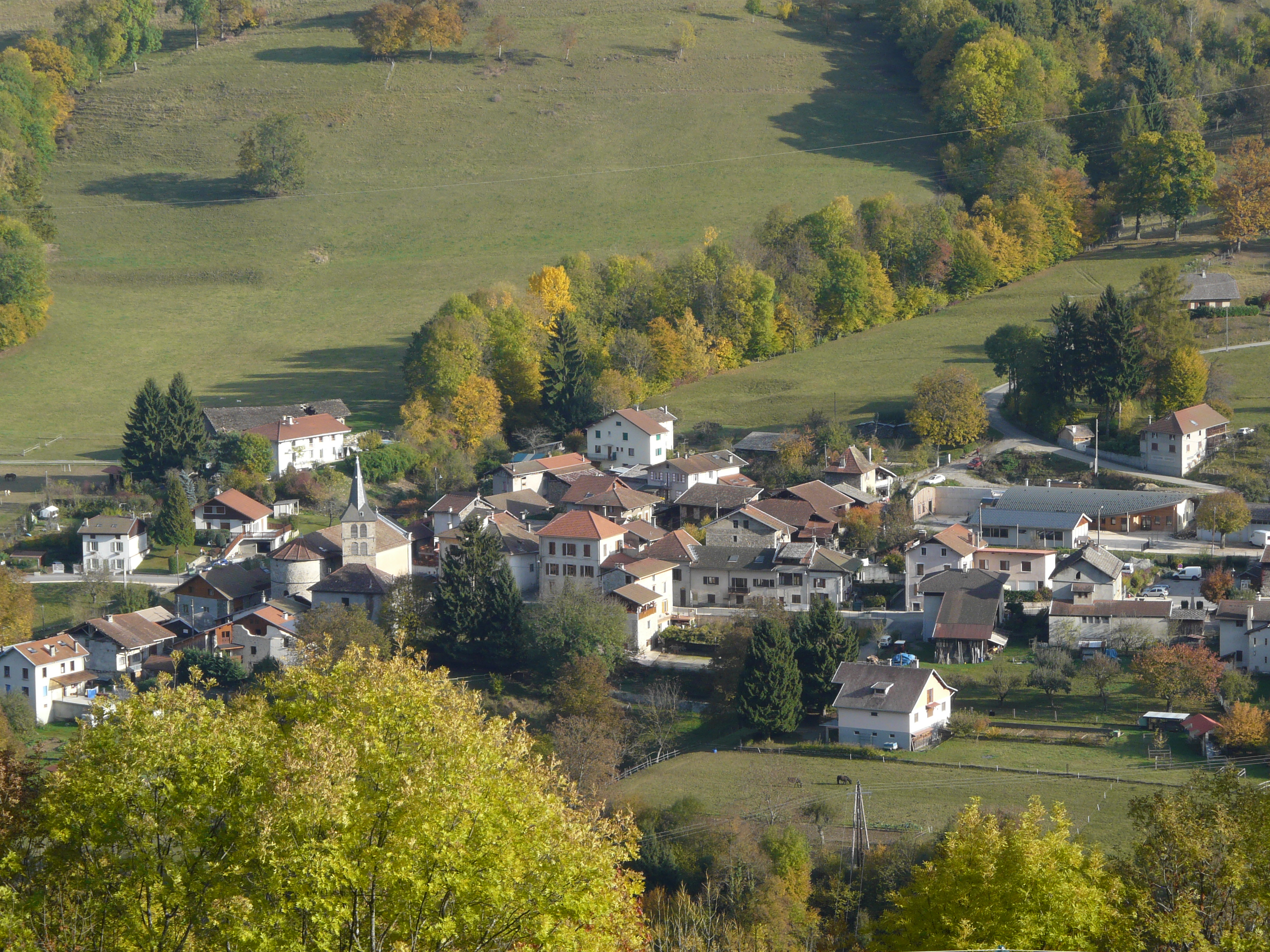
- La Chapelle-du-Bard seen from Le Moutaret

- Coat of arms
- Location of La Chapelle-du-Bard
- Location within France Location within Auvergne-Rhône-Alpes
- Coordinates: 45°25′25″N 6°05′47″E
- Country: France
- Region: Auvergne-Rhône-Alpes
- Department: Isère
- Arrondissement: Grenoble
- Canton: Le Haut-Grésivaudan
- Intercommunality: CC Le Grésivaudan

Government
  - Mayor (2022–2026): Karim Chamon
- Area^{1}: 28 km^{2} (11 sq mi)
- Elevation: 440 m (1,440 ft)
- Highest elevation: 2,526 m (8,287 ft)
- Lowest elevation: 358 m (1,175 ft)
- Population (2023): 541
  - Density: 19/km^{2} (50/sq mi)
- Time zone: UTC+01:00 (CET)
  - Summer (DST): UTC+02:00 (CEST)
- INSEE/Postal code: 38078 /38580
- ^{1} French Land Register data, which excludes lakes, ponds, glaciers > 1 km^{2} (0.386 sq mi or 247 acres) and river estuaries.

La Chapelle-du-Bard (French pronunciation: [la ʃapɛl dy baʁ]) is a commune in the Isère department in southeastern France.

== Population ==
Historical population
Year	Pop.	±% p.a.
1968	351	—
1975	314	−1.58%
1982	295	−0.89%
1990	346	+2.01%
1999	426	+2.34%
2007	471	+1.26%
2012	526	+2.23%
2017	571	+1.66%
2023	541	−0.90%
Source: INSEE

== See also ==
- Communes of the Isère department
