= Le Champ-près-Froges =

- Commune
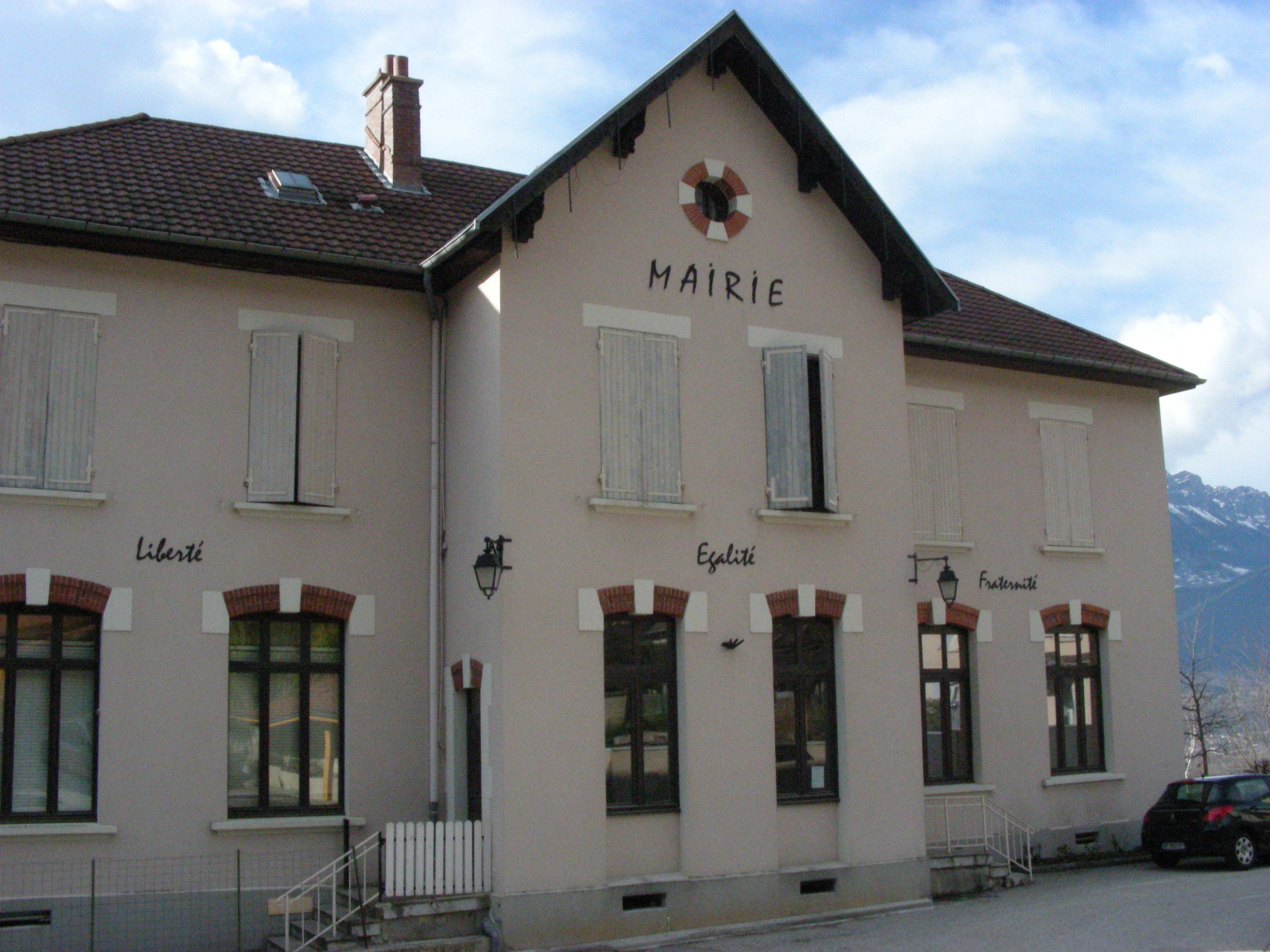
- Town hall
- Location of Le Champ-près-Froges
- Location within France Location within Auvergne-Rhône-Alpes
- Coordinates: 45°16′54″N 5°56′22″E
- Country: France
- Region: Auvergne-Rhône-Alpes
- Department: Isère
- Arrondissement: Grenoble
- Canton: Le Haut-Grésivaudan
- Intercommunality: CC Le Grésivaudan

Government
  - Mayor (2020–2026): Mylène Jacquin
- Area^{1}: 5 km^{2} (1.9 sq mi)
- Elevation: 320 m (1,050 ft)
- Highest elevation: 826 m (2,710 ft)
- Lowest elevation: 220 m (720 ft)
- Population (2023): 1,289
  - Density: 260/km^{2} (670/sq mi)
- Time zone: UTC+01:00 (CET)
  - Summer (DST): UTC+02:00 (CEST)
- INSEE/Postal code: 38070 /38190
- ^{1} French Land Register data, which excludes lakes, ponds, glaciers > 1 km^{2} (0.386 sq mi or 247 acres) and river estuaries.

Le Champ-près-Froges (French pronunciation: [lə ʃɑ̃ pʁɛ fʁɔʒ], literally Le Champ near Froges) is a commune in the Isère department in southeastern France. It is part of the Grenoble urban unit (agglomeration).

== Population ==
Historical population
Year	Pop.	±% p.a.
1968	556	—
1975	701	+3.37%
1982	924	+4.02%
1990	1,008	+1.09%
1999	1,158	+1.55%
2007	1,207	+0.52%
2012	1,229	+0.36%
2017	1,197	−0.53%
2023	1,289	+1.24%
Source: INSEE

== See also ==
- Communes of the Isère department
