= Canton of Le Haut-Grésivaudan =

Coordinates: 45.43°N 6.02°E

The canton of Le Haut-Grésivaudan is an administrative division of the Isère department, eastern France. It was created at the French canton reorganisation which came into effect in March 2015. Its seat is in Pontcharra.

It consists of the following communes:

1. Les Adrets
2. Allevard
3. Barraux
4. La Buissière
5. Le Champ-près-Froges
6. Chapareillan
7. La Chapelle-du-Bard
8. Le Cheylas
9. Crêts-en-Belledonne
10. La Flachère
11. Froges
12. Goncelin
13. Le Haut-Bréda
14. Hurtières
15. Le Moutaret
16. La Pierre
17. Pontcharra
18. Sainte-Marie-d'Alloix
19. Sainte-Marie-du-Mont
20. Saint-Maximin
21. Saint-Vincent-de-Mercuze
22. Tencin
23. Theys
24. Le Touvet
