= La Flachère =

- Commune
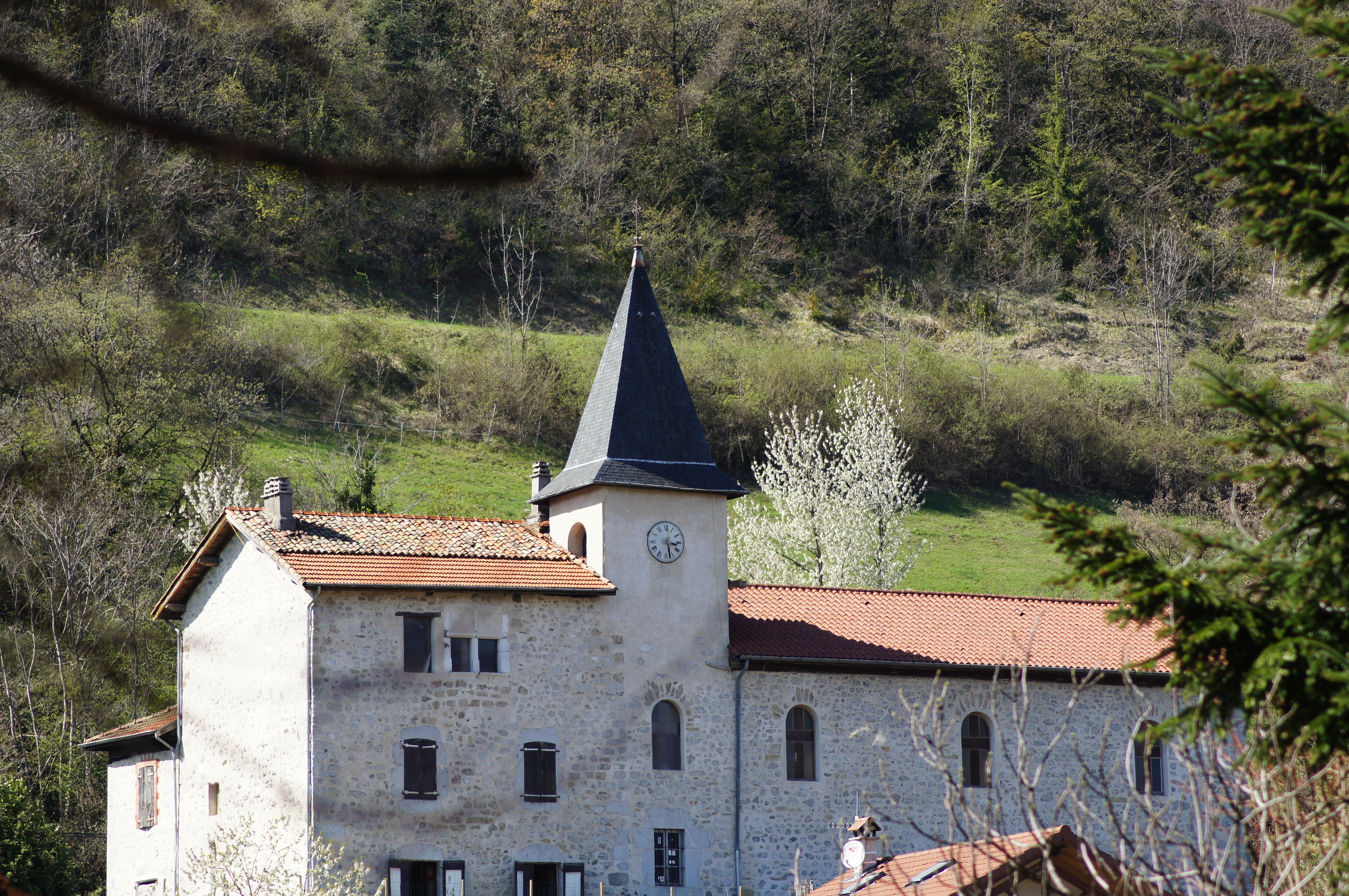
- The church of La Flachère
- Location of La Flachère
- Location within France Location within Auvergne-Rhône-Alpes
- Coordinates: 45°23′58″N 5°57′49″E
- Country: France
- Region: Auvergne-Rhône-Alpes
- Department: Isère
- Arrondissement: Grenoble
- Canton: Le Haut-Grésivaudan
- Intercommunality: CC Le Grésivaudan

Government
  - Mayor (2020–2026): Brigitte Sorrel
- Area^{1}: 3 km^{2} (1.2 sq mi)
- Highest elevation: 920 m (3,020 ft)
- Lowest elevation: 319 m (1,047 ft)
- Population (2023): 449
  - Density: 150/km^{2} (390/sq mi)
- Time zone: UTC+01:00 (CET)
  - Summer (DST): UTC+02:00 (CEST)
- INSEE/Postal code: 38166 /38530
- ^{1} French Land Register data, which excludes lakes, ponds, glaciers > 1 km^{2} (0.386 sq mi or 247 acres) and river estuaries.

La Flachère (French pronunciation: [la flaʃɛʁ]) is a commune in the Isère department in southeastern France.

== Population ==
Historical population
Year	Pop.	±% p.a.
1968	181	—
1975	161	−1.66%
1982	222	+4.70%
1990	302	+3.92%
1999	387	+2.79%
2007	424	+1.15%
2012	453	+1.33%
2017	490	+1.58%
2023	449	−1.45%
Source: INSEE

== See also ==
- Communes of the Isère department
