= Hurtières =

- Commune
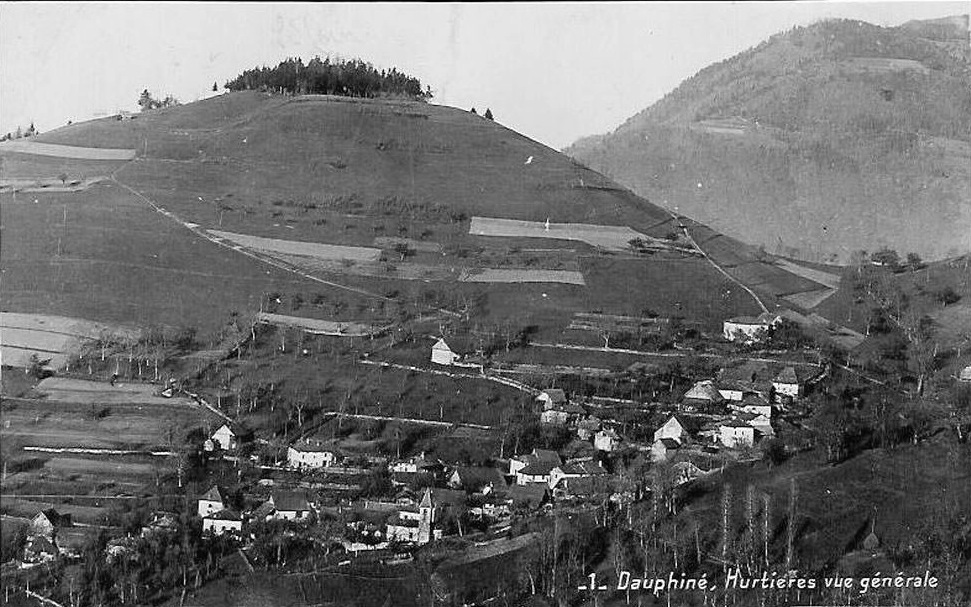
- A general view of Hurtières in the early 20th century
- Location of Hurtières
- Location within France Location within Auvergne-Rhône-Alpes
- Coordinates: 45°17′19″N 5°58′17″E
- Country: France
- Region: Auvergne-Rhône-Alpes
- Department: Isère
- Arrondissement: Grenoble
- Canton: Le Haut-Grésivaudan
- Intercommunality: CC Le Grésivaudan

Government
  - Mayor (2020–2026): Alain Roussel
- Area^{1}: 3.35 km^{2} (1.29 sq mi)
- Elevation: 720 m (2,360 ft)
- Highest elevation: 1,038 m (3,406 ft)
- Lowest elevation: 429 m (1,407 ft)
- Population (2023): 233
  - Density: 69.6/km^{2} (180/sq mi)
- Time zone: UTC+01:00 (CET)
  - Summer (DST): UTC+02:00 (CEST)
- INSEE/Postal code: 38192 /38570
- ^{1} French Land Register data, which excludes lakes, ponds, glaciers > 1 km^{2} (0.386 sq mi or 247 acres) and river estuaries.

Hurtières (French pronunciation: [yʁtjɛʁ]) is a commune in the Isère department in southeastern France.

== Population ==
Historical population
| Year | Pop. | ±% p.a. |
|---|---|---|
| 1968 | 85 | — |
| 1975 | 58 | −5.31% |
| 1982 | 53 | −1.28% |
| 1990 | 95 | +7.57% |
| 1999 | 121 | +2.72% |
| 2007 | 173 | +4.57% |
| 2012 | 181 | +0.91% |
| 2017 | 168 | −1.48% |
| 2023 | 233 | +5.60% |
Source: INSEE

== See also ==
- Communes of the Isère department
