= Barraux =

- Commune
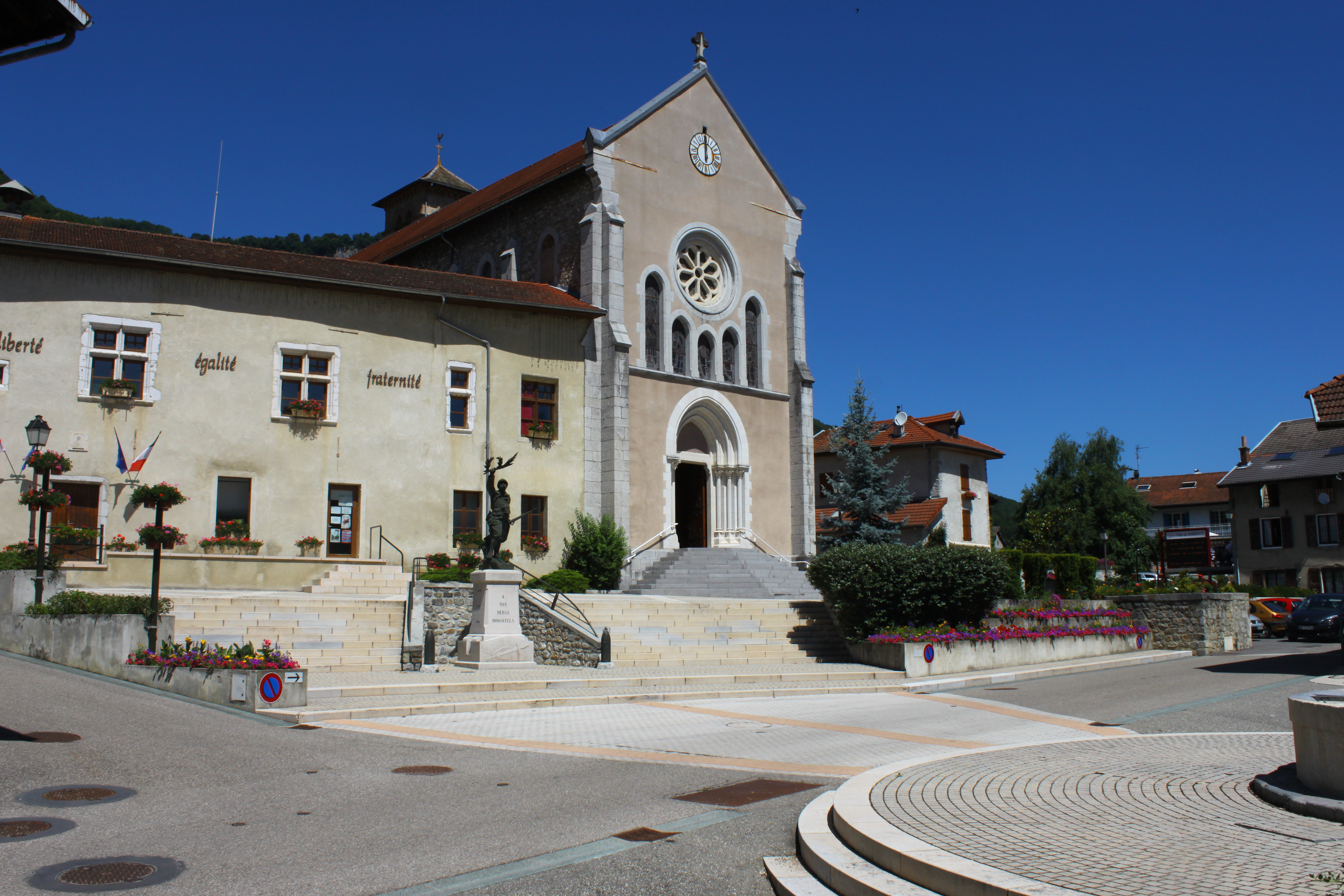
- The town hall and church of Barraux
- Location of Barraux
- Location within France Location within Auvergne-Rhône-Alpes
- Coordinates: 45°26′07″N 5°58′42″E
- Country: France
- Region: Auvergne-Rhône-Alpes
- Department: Isère
- Arrondissement: Grenoble
- Canton: Le Haut-Grésivaudan
- Intercommunality: CC Le Grésivaudan

Government
  - Mayor (2021–2026): Christophe Engrand
- Area^{1}: 11 km^{2} (4.2 sq mi)
- Elevation: 360 m (1,180 ft)
- Highest elevation: 950 m (3,120 ft)
- Lowest elevation: 241 m (791 ft)
- Population (2023): 2,016
  - Density: 180/km^{2} (470/sq mi)
- Time zone: UTC+01:00 (CET)
  - Summer (DST): UTC+02:00 (CEST)
- INSEE/Postal code: 38027 /38530
- ^{1} French Land Register data, which excludes lakes, ponds, glaciers > 1 km^{2} (0.386 sq mi or 247 acres) and river estuaries.

Barraux (French pronunciation: [baʁo]) is a commune in the Isère department in southeastern France. It includes the hamlets of Le Fayet, La Gache, and the 15th century fort, Fort Barraux.

== Location ==
Barraux has the village of Chapareillan to the north; La Buissiere, Le Boissieu and La Flachere to the south; Pontcharra to the east and Sainte-Marie-du-Mont, on the Plateau des Petites Roches to the west. It is situated in the valley of the Gresivaudan through which the Isère river flows.

== Population ==
The inhabitants of Barraux are called Barrolins in French.

Historical population
Year	Pop.	±% p.a.
1968	800	—
1975	871	+1.22%
1982	939	+1.08%
1990	1,214	+3.26%
1999	1,474	+2.18%
2007	1,801	+2.54%
2012	1,897	+1.04%
2017	1,886	−0.12%
2023	2,016	+1.12%
Source: INSEE

== History (the village) ==
The village of Barraux was probably founded as part of the supply chain to feed the fort Barraux built by Charles Emmanuel II to act as a border fort. In 1985, the fort was given back to the village of Barraux by the French army.

=== Fort Saint Barthélémy ===
Fort Saint Barthélémy (eventually Fort Barraux) is the oldest fort using bastions in France. It was built in 1597 and its aspects have changed very little over the past 400 years. The general layout invented by the Piedmontese architect Ercole Negro was left almost intact by its followers: A fortress with an extended star shape with a narrow end, including many bastions and ditches.

The fort was captured soon after its completion by Lesdiguières, the Constable of Dauphiné. A few enhancements were undertaken by the engineers of King Henry IV but didn't affect its general layout.

Vauban, Fortress Inspector in Chief of King Louis XIV in the late 17th century didn't change the arrangement of bastions and curtains. He instead improved the various buildings inside the fort: two barracks, the well, the chapel, the large powder magazine and the gate house; as well as expanding the fortifications internally and externally.

=== 17th century ===
Original held at Bibliothèque Municipale of Grenoble. Engineers improved the fort, but kept the general layout designed by Ercole Negro.

- Jean de Beins enlarges the fort eastward and builds the Governor Hotel.
- Camus builds forward bastions southward.
- Delangrunne levels the West curtain and extracts the central bastion to form the entrance ravelin (or demi-lune).
- Entrance of the fort is moved several times during that century. Initially located on the North front (with an access through the Savoie ravelin), it ends up facing West, where it is still today.

=== Vauban and the Fort ===
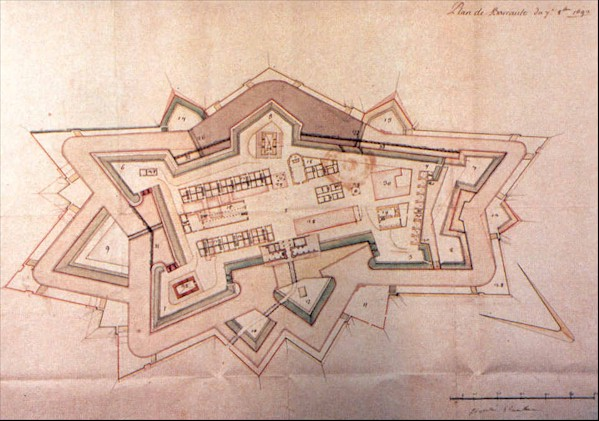
Drawing by Vauban (1692). Original at Historical Services of the French Army (Vincennes)

When Vauban arrived at the fort in 1692 he was extremely negative about what was achieved by its predecessors. He asked for the improvement of the most obvious weaknesses:

Map of Fort Barraux (c. 1750)

- Ditches were to be made 2 meters (6 feet) deeper.
- Design of bastions were modified, with their edges sharpened.
- Width of covered ways was reduced, their layout streamlined and profile remodeled. Traverses are cut into them to confine the effect of ricochet fire.
- Galleries were added inside the flanks of bastions.
- Watchtowers were remodeled.
- Communication between the central fort and the ravelin of Savoie is modified with the addition of an open caponniere including parapets and palisades.
- Curtains of the North and East fronts are enhanced with the addition of light tenailles and palisades.
- Creation of a southern redoubt.

=== 18th to 20th centuries ===
- The gate house and the magazine were completed in the early 18th century. Two additional barracks were built.
- The modern chapel was built in 1724 thanks to a gift from King Louis XV on the ruins of the initial chapel from the Renaissance.
- Large scale construction resumes circa 1820 with the addition of a casemate on the south front to reinforce its defense.
- A cylindrical obstacle called "demoiselle" (Miss), was erected on the top of a traverse that crosses the ditch. Besiegers that would cross this traverse would have to 'kiss' the Miss to bypass it, hence the name.
- In the 1870s, unrest with Italy lead to the construction of 6 forts around Grenoble. During the 19th century, defenses of Fort Barraux were also enhanced.
- The fort was used as a prison during both world wars; then in 1947, it was turned into an ammunition depot. The fort was left by the military in 1985 and was gifted to the municipality of Barraux.
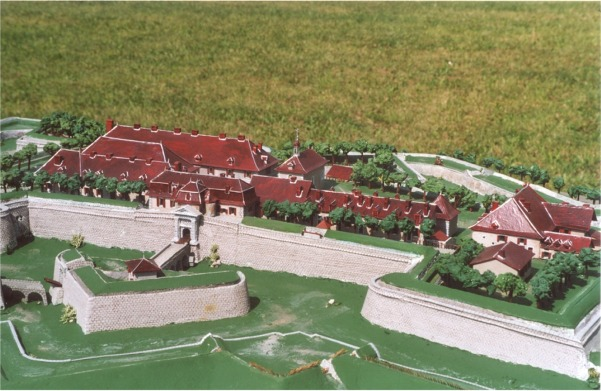
A scale model of the fort entrance

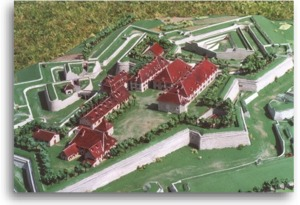
A scale model of the fort

== Twin towns ==
Barraux is twinned with:

- Lanhouarneau, France

== See also ==
- Charles Emmanuel II
- Isère
- Grenoble
- Dauphiné
- Dukes of Savoy
