= Sainte-Marie-du-Mont, Isère =

Sainte-Marie-du-Mont
- Commune
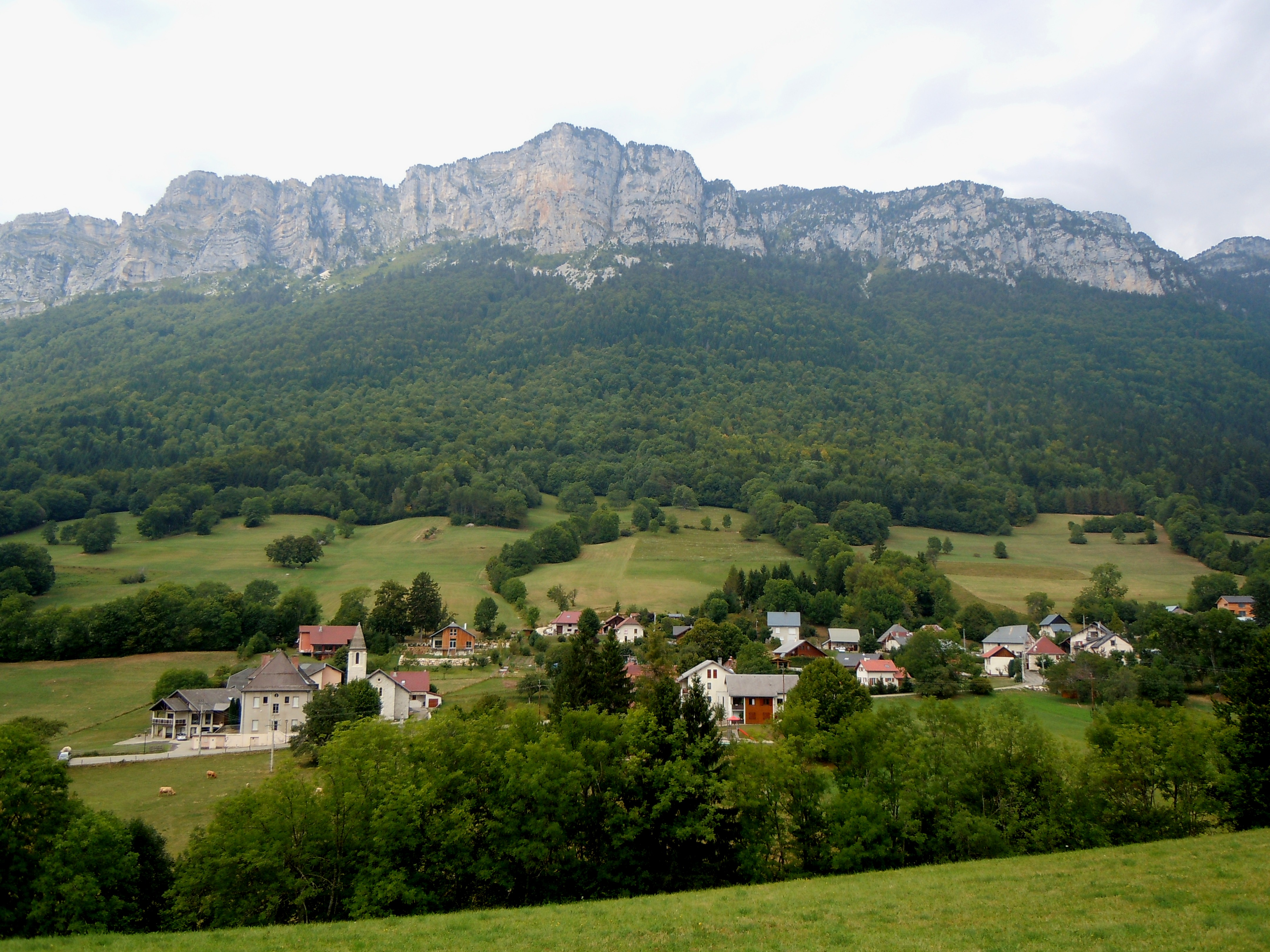
- A general view of Sainte-Marie-du-Mont
- Location of Sainte-Marie-du-Mont
- Location within France Location within Auvergne-Rhône-Alpes
- Coordinates: 45°24′25″N 5°56′47″E
- Country: France
- Region: Auvergne-Rhône-Alpes
- Department: Isère
- Arrondissement: Grenoble
- Canton: Le Haut-Grésivaudan
- Intercommunality: CC Le Grésivaudan

Government
  - Mayor (2024–2026): Clément Bonnet
- Area^{1}: 24 km^{2} (9.3 sq mi)
- Elevation: 934 m (3,064 ft)
- Highest elevation: 1,880 m (6,170 ft)
- Lowest elevation: 522 m (1,713 ft)
- Population (2023): 243
  - Density: 10/km^{2} (26/sq mi)
- Time zone: UTC+01:00 (CET)
  - Summer (DST): UTC+02:00 (CEST)
- INSEE/Postal code: 38418 /38660
- ^{1} French Land Register data, which excludes lakes, ponds, glaciers > 1 km^{2} (0.386 sq mi or 247 acres) and river estuaries.

Sainte-Marie-du-Mont (French pronunciation: [sɛ̃t maʁi dy mɔ̃]) is a commune in the Isère department in southeastern France.

== Population ==
Historical population
| Year | Pop. | ±% p.a. |
|---|---|---|
| 1968 | 42 | — |
| 1975 | 29 | −5.15% |
| 1982 | 45 | +6.48% |
| 1990 | 116 | +12.57% |
| 1999 | 204 | +6.47% |
| 2007 | 221 | +1.01% |
| 2012 | 239 | +1.58% |
| 2017 | 237 | −0.17% |
| 2023 | 243 | +0.42% |
Source: INSEE

== See also ==
- Communes of the Isère department
