= Saint-Vincent-de-Mercuze =

- Commune
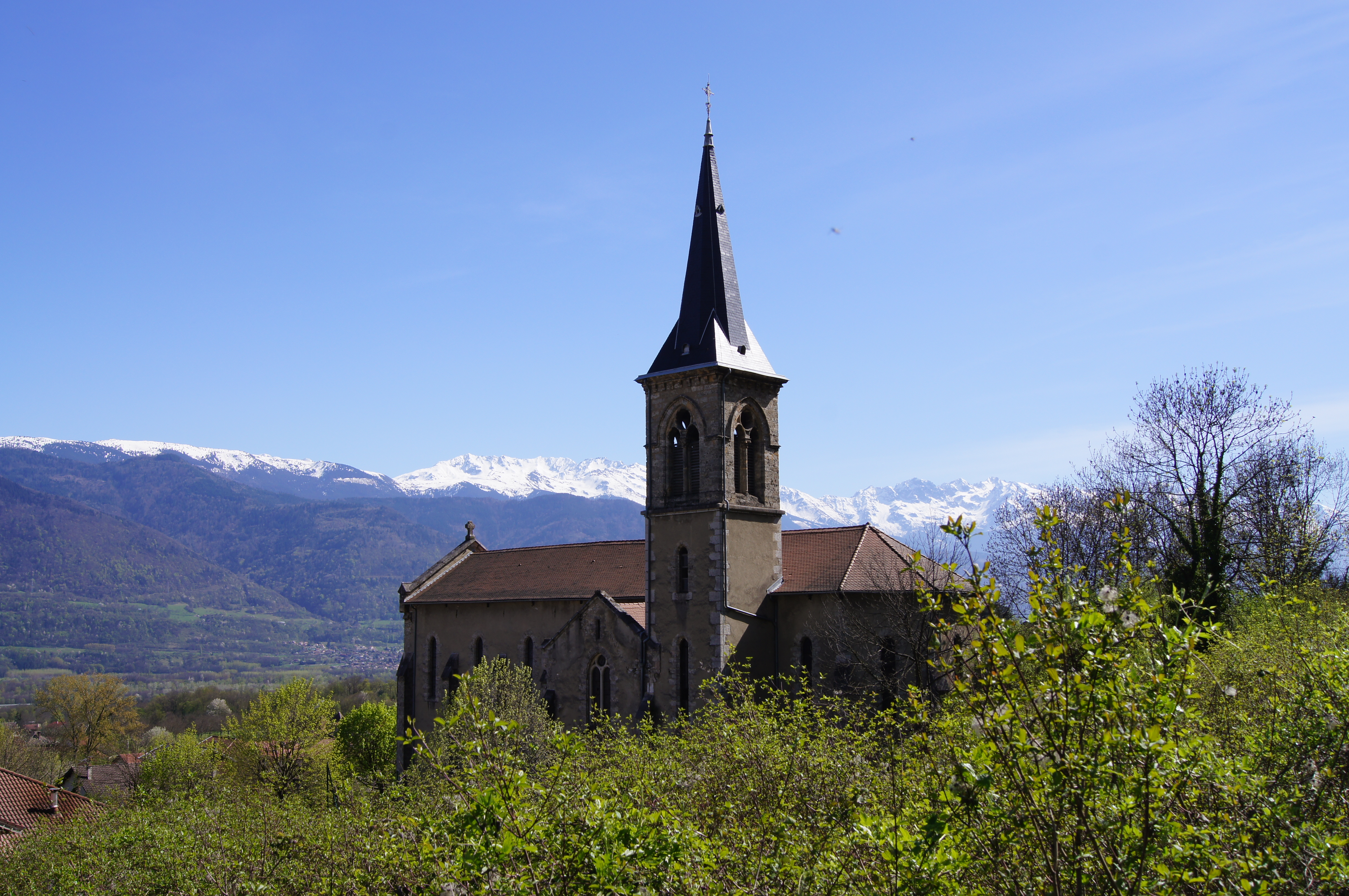
- The church of Saint-Vincent-de-Mercuze
- Location of Saint-Vincent-de-Mercuze
- Location within France Location within Auvergne-Rhône-Alpes
- Coordinates: 45°22′30″N 5°57′02″E
- Country: France
- Region: Auvergne-Rhône-Alpes
- Department: Isère
- Arrondissement: Grenoble
- Canton: Le Haut-Grésivaudan
- Intercommunality: CC Le Grésivaudan

Government
  - Mayor (2020–2026): Philippe Baudain
- Area^{1}: 8 km^{2} (3.1 sq mi)
- Elevation: 347 m (1,138 ft)
- Highest elevation: 863 m (2,831 ft)
- Lowest elevation: 238 m (781 ft)
- Population (2023): 1,532
  - Density: 190/km^{2} (500/sq mi)
- Time zone: UTC+01:00 (CET)
  - Summer (DST): UTC+02:00 (CEST)
- INSEE/Postal code: 38466 /38660
- ^{1} French Land Register data, which excludes lakes, ponds, glaciers > 1 km^{2} (0.386 sq mi or 247 acres) and river estuaries.

Saint-Vincent-de-Mercuze (French pronunciation: [sɛ̃ vɛ̃sɑ̃ də mɛʁkyz]) is a commune in the Isère department in southeastern France.

== Population ==
Historical population
Year	Pop.	±% p.a.
1968	433	—
1975	543	+3.29%
1982	757	+4.86%
1990	1,060	+4.30%
1999	1,360	+2.81%
2007	1,386	+0.24%
2012	1,375	−0.16%
2017	1,519	+2.01%
2023	1,532	+0.14%
Source: INSEE

== See also ==
- Communes of the Isère department
