= Tencin =

- Commune
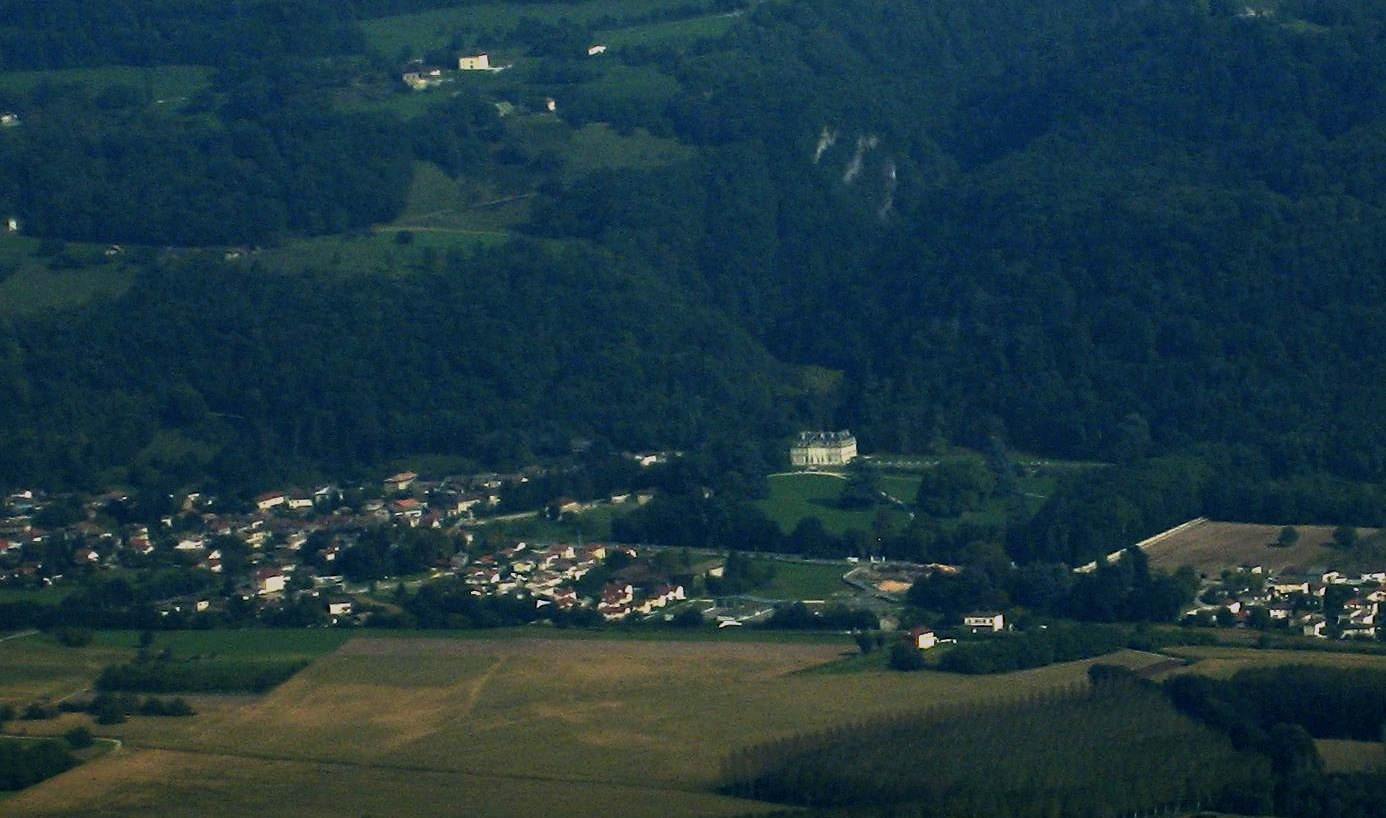
- A general view of Tencin

- Coat of arms
- Location of Tencin
- Location within France Location within Auvergne-Rhône-Alpes
- Coordinates: 45°18′40″N 5°57′36″E
- Country: France
- Region: Auvergne-Rhône-Alpes
- Department: Isère
- Arrondissement: Grenoble
- Canton: Le Haut-Grésivaudan
- Intercommunality: CC Le Grésivaudan

Government
  - Mayor (2020–2026): François Stefani
- Area^{1}: 7 km^{2} (2.7 sq mi)
- Elevation: 231 m (758 ft)
- Highest elevation: 1,116 m (3,661 ft)
- Lowest elevation: 229 m (751 ft)
- Population (2023): 2,180
  - Density: 310/km^{2} (810/sq mi)
- Time zone: UTC+01:00 (CET)
  - Summer (DST): UTC+02:00 (CEST)
- INSEE/Postal code: 38501 /38570
- ^{1} French Land Register data, which excludes lakes, ponds, glaciers > 1 km^{2} (0.386 sq mi or 247 acres) and river estuaries.

Tencin (French pronunciation: [tɑ̃sɛ̃]) is a commune in the Isère department in southeastern France. It is part of the Grenoble urban unit (agglomeration).

== Population ==
Historical population

Year	Pop.	±% p.a.
1793	748	—
1821	831	+0.38%
1846	1,096	+1.11%
1872	934	−0.61%
1901	703	−0.97%
1926	614	−0.54%
1946	476	−1.26%
1962	824	+3.49%
1968	847	+0.46%

Year	Pop.	±% p.a.
1975	858	+0.18%
1982	855	−0.05%
1990	859	+0.06%
1999	897	+0.48%
2007	1,171	+3.39%
2012	1,622	+6.73%
2017	2,095	+5.25%
2023	2,180	+0.67%

Source: EHESS and INSEE (1968-2023)

== See also ==
- Communes of the Isère department
