= Noon mark =

Type of sundial

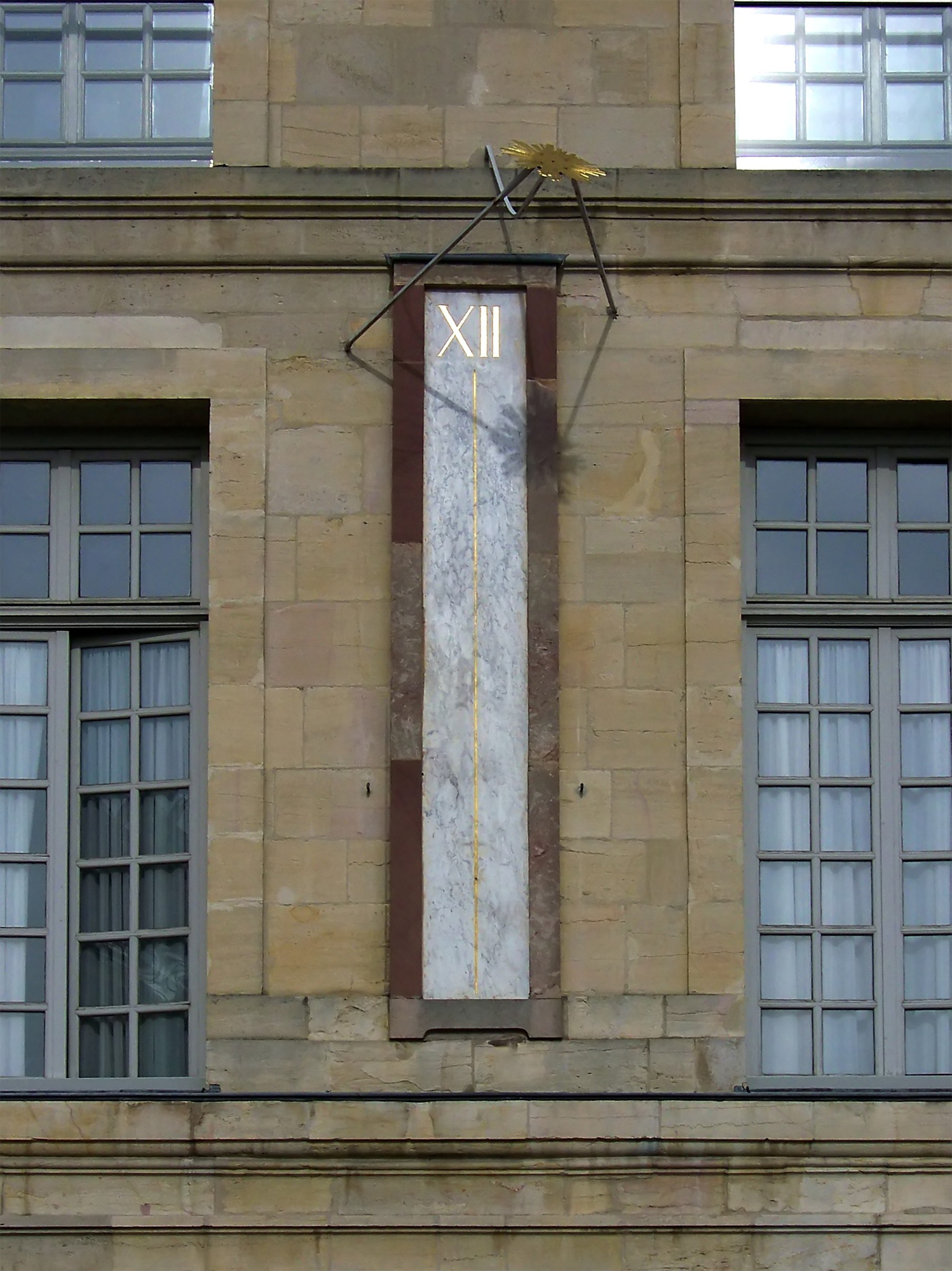
A noon mark on the facade of the Palace of the Dukes of Burgundy in Dijon

The Noon mark is a type of sundial that at its simplest is a vertical line on a south facing wall or a north-south line on a horizontal pavement. When the shadow of a point (or a projected image of the Sun) crosses the line it will be midday. Noon in local standard time is defined as when the sun is overhead, however clocks and watches use mean time which varies from standard time by a few minutes each day. The difference is calculated using the equation of time and this can be shown on the noon mark by drawing an analemma, or using a correction table.
