= Isaïe Schwartz =

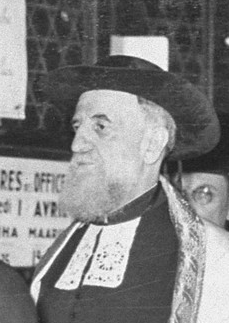
A portrait of Isaïe Schwartz

Isaïe Schwartz (15 January 1876, in Traenheim – 1952, in Paris) was the Great Rabbi of France at the beginning of World War II.
