= Sainte-Marie-d'Alloix =

- Commune
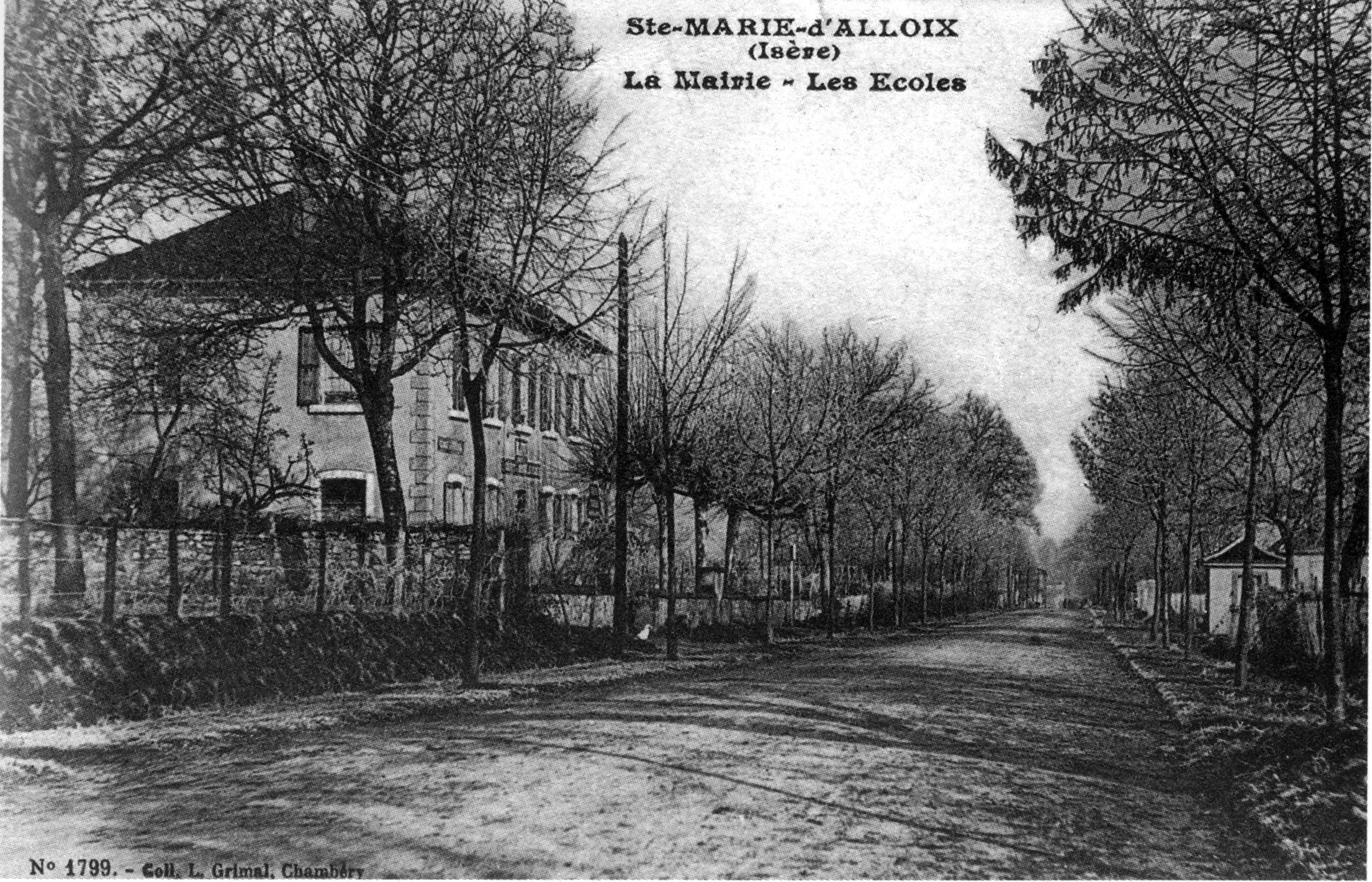
- The town hall and schools in 1912
- Location of Sainte-Marie-d'Alloix
- Location within France Location within Auvergne-Rhône-Alpes
- Coordinates: 45°22′59″N 5°58′01″E
- Country: France
- Region: Auvergne-Rhône-Alpes
- Department: Isère
- Arrondissement: Grenoble
- Canton: Le Haut-Grésivaudan
- Intercommunality: CC Le Grésivaudan

Government
  - Mayor (2020–2026): Michel Basset
- Area^{1}: 3 km^{2} (1.2 sq mi)
- Elevation: 248 m (814 ft)
- Highest elevation: 380 m (1,250 ft)
- Lowest elevation: 242 m (794 ft)
- Population (2023): 486
  - Density: 160/km^{2} (420/sq mi)
- Time zone: UTC+01:00 (CET)
  - Summer (DST): UTC+02:00 (CEST)
- INSEE/Postal code: 38417 /38660
- ^{1} French Land Register data, which excludes lakes, ponds, glaciers > 1 km^{2} (0.386 sq mi or 247 acres) and river estuaries.

Sainte-Marie-d'Alloix (French pronunciation: [sɛ̃t maʁi dalwa]) is a commune in the Isère department in southeastern France.

== Population ==
Historical population
Year	Pop.	±% p.a.
1968	186	—
1975	211	+1.82%
1982	308	+5.55%
1990	413	+3.73%
1999	568	+3.60%
2007	568	+0.00%
2012	550	−0.64%
2017	478	−2.77%
2023	486	+0.28%
Source: INSEE

== See also ==
- Communes of the Isère department
