= La Buissière =

- Commune
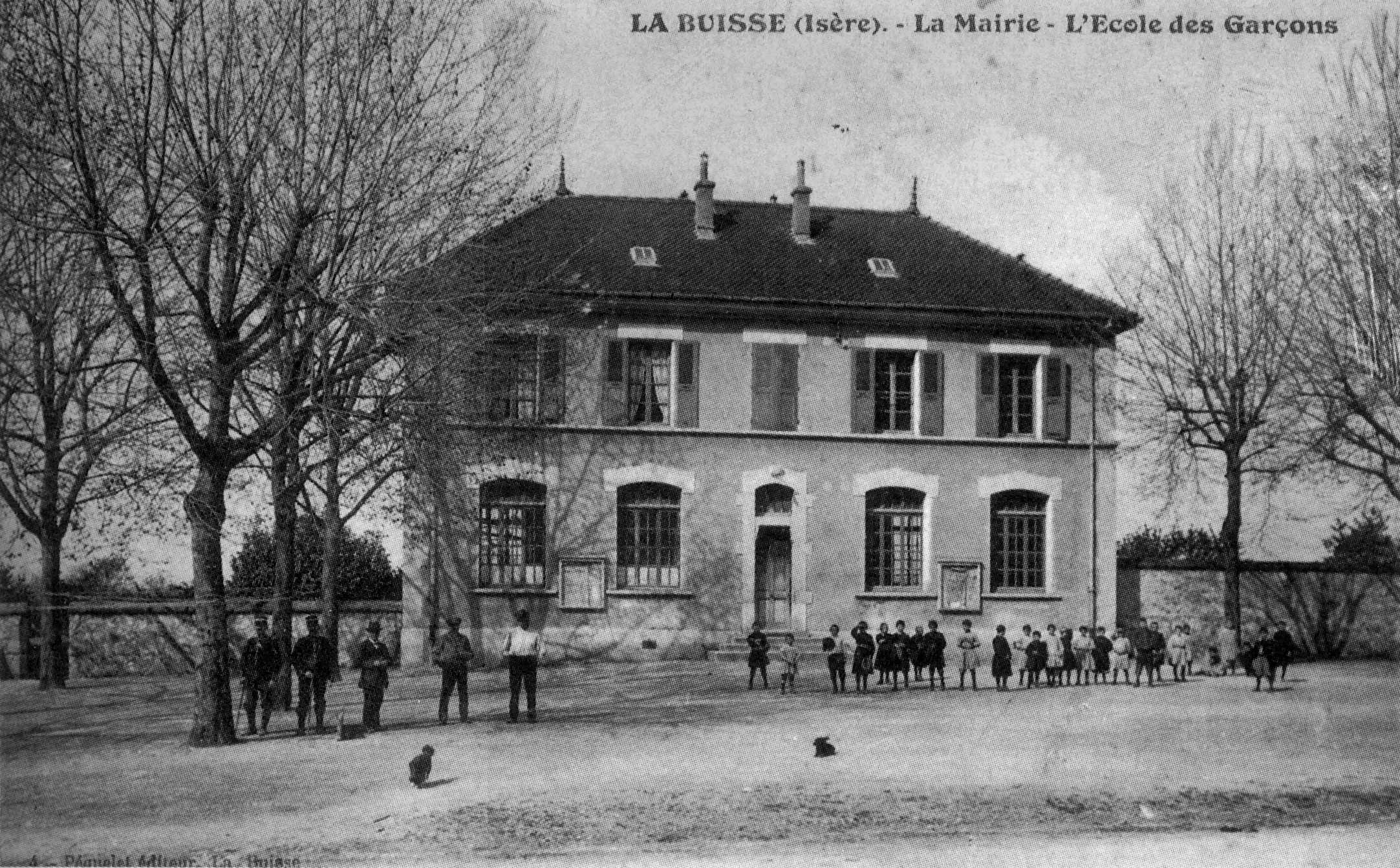
- The town hall and boys' school in 1912

- Coat of arms
- Location of La Buissière
- Location within France Location within Auvergne-Rhône-Alpes
- Coordinates: 45°24′12″N 5°58′45″E
- Country: France
- Region: Auvergne-Rhône-Alpes
- Department: Isère
- Arrondissement: Grenoble
- Canton: Le Haut-Grésivaudan
- Intercommunality: CC Le Grésivaudan

Government
  - Mayor (2020–2026): Agnes Dupon
- Area^{1}: 8 km^{2} (3.1 sq mi)
- Highest elevation: 420 m (1,380 ft)
- Lowest elevation: 242 m (794 ft)
- Population (2023): 827
  - Density: 100/km^{2} (270/sq mi)
- Time zone: UTC+01:00 (CET)
  - Summer (DST): UTC+02:00 (CEST)
- INSEE/Postal code: 38062 /38530
- ^{1} French Land Register data, which excludes lakes, ponds, glaciers > 1 km^{2} (0.386 sq mi or 247 acres) and river estuaries.

La Buissière (French pronunciation: [la bɥisjɛʁ]) is a commune in the Isère department in southeastern France.

== Population ==
Historical population

Year	Pop.	±% p.a.
1793	570	—
1821	800	+1.22%
1841	815	+0.09%
1861	744	−0.45%
1881	604	−1.04%
1901	567	−0.32%
1921	431	−1.36%
1946	401	−0.29%
1962	356	−0.74%

Year	Pop.	±% p.a.
1968	384	+1.27%
1975	369	−0.57%
1982	346	−0.92%
1990	475	+4.04%
1999	566	+1.97%
2007	661	+1.96%
2012	673	+0.36%
2017	669	−0.12%
2023	827	+3.60%

Source: EHESS and INSEE

== See also ==
- Communes of the Isère department
