= Le Moutaret =

- Commune
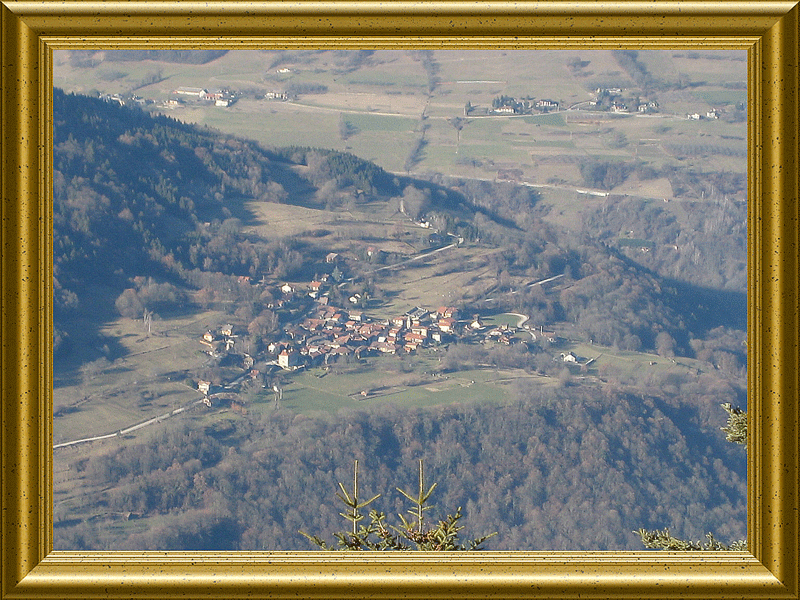
- Le Moutaret seen from Le Collet d'Allevard ski station
- Location of Le Moutaret
- Location within France Location within Auvergne-Rhône-Alpes
- Coordinates: 45°25′58″N 6°05′21″E
- Country: France
- Region: Auvergne-Rhône-Alpes
- Department: Isère
- Arrondissement: Grenoble
- Canton: Le Haut-Grésivaudan
- Intercommunality: CC Le Grésivaudan

Government
  - Mayor (2020–2026): Alain Guilluy
- Area^{1}: 5 km^{2} (1.9 sq mi)
- Highest elevation: 1,089 m (3,573 ft)
- Lowest elevation: 320 m (1,050 ft)
- Population (2023): 250
  - Density: 50/km^{2} (130/sq mi)
- Time zone: UTC+01:00 (CET)
  - Summer (DST): UTC+02:00 (CEST)
- INSEE/Postal code: 38268 /38580
- ^{1} French Land Register data, which excludes lakes, ponds, glaciers > 1 km^{2} (0.386 sq mi or 247 acres) and river estuaries.

Le Moutaret (French pronunciation: [lə mutaʁɛ]) is a commune in the Isère department in southeastern France.

== Population ==
Historical population
Year	Pop.	±% p.a.
1968	129	—
1975	127	−0.22%
1982	128	+0.11%
1990	142	+1.31%
1999	161	+1.41%
2007	206	+3.13%
2012	237	+2.84%
2017	261	+1.95%
2023	250	−0.72%
Source: INSEE

== See also ==
- Communes of the Isère department
