= Froges =

- Commune
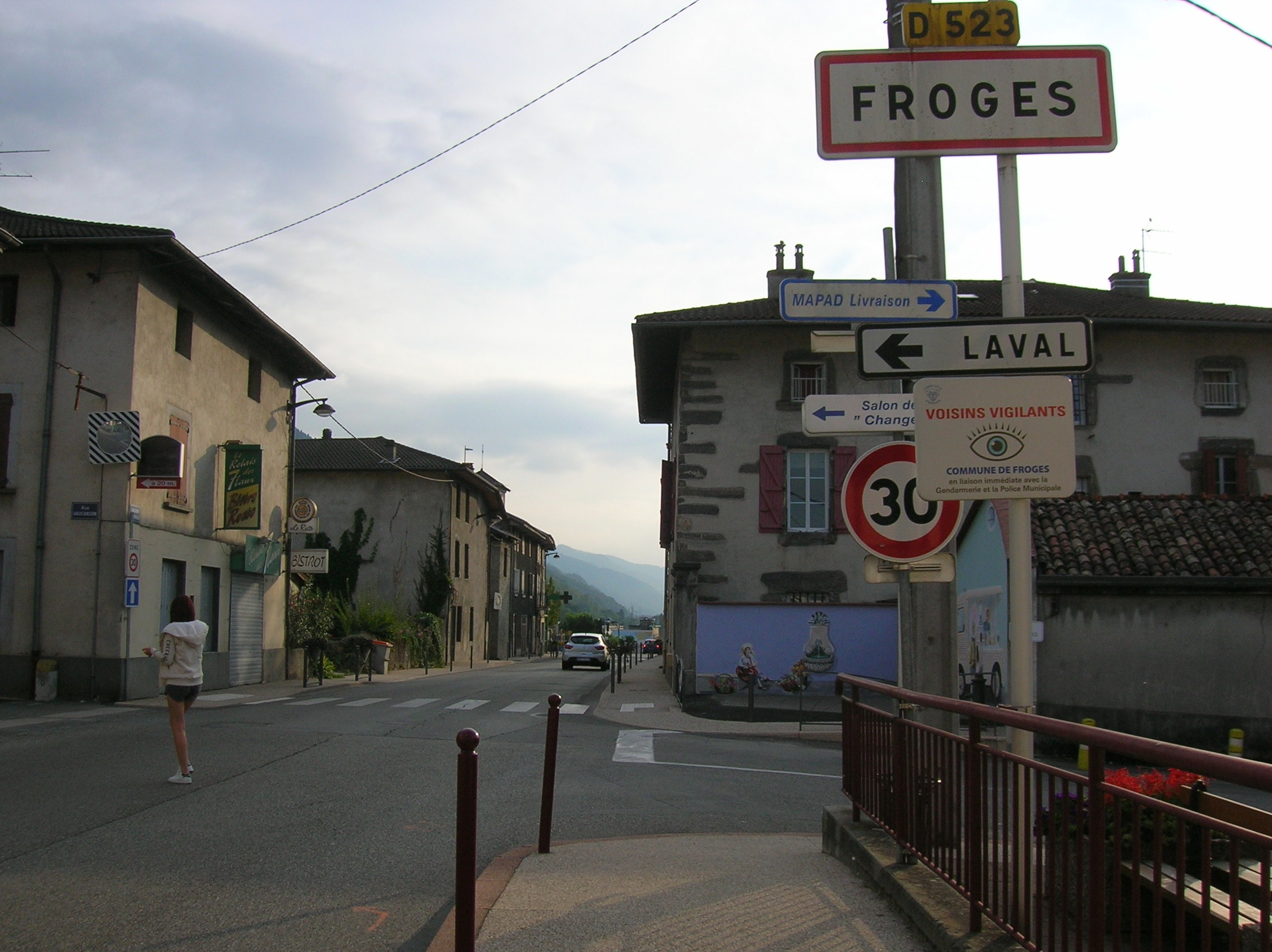
- The road into Froges

- Coat of arms
- Location of Froges
- Location within France Location within Auvergne-Rhône-Alpes
- Coordinates: 45°16′27″N 5°55′33″E
- Country: France
- Region: Auvergne-Rhône-Alpes
- Department: Isère
- Arrondissement: Grenoble
- Canton: Le Haut-Grésivaudan
- Intercommunality: CC Le Grésivaudan

Government
  - Mayor (2020–2026): Olivier Salvetti
- Area^{1}: 6.43 km^{2} (2.48 sq mi)
- Elevation: 234 m (768 ft)
- Highest elevation: 965 m (3,166 ft)
- Lowest elevation: 219 m (719 ft)
- Population (2023): 3,285
  - Density: 511/km^{2} (1,320/sq mi)
- Time zone: UTC+01:00 (CET)
  - Summer (DST): UTC+02:00 (CEST)
- INSEE/Postal code: 38175 /38190
- ^{1} French Land Register data, which excludes lakes, ponds, glaciers > 1 km^{2} (0.386 sq mi or 247 acres) and river estuaries.

Froges (French pronunciation: [fʁɔʒ]) is a commune in the Isère department in southeastern France. It is part of the Grenoble urban unit (agglomeration).

== Population ==
Historical population

Year	Pop.	±% p.a.
1793	477	—
1800	450	−0.83%
1806	532	+2.83%
1821	517	−0.19%
1831	581	+1.17%
1836	571	−0.35%
1841	527	−1.59%
1846	546	+0.71%
1851	537	−0.33%
1856	538	+0.04%
1861	503	−1.34%
1866	466	−1.52%
1872	503	+1.28%
1876	521	+0.88%
1881	553	+1.20%
1886	577	+0.85%
1891	569	−0.28%
1896	515	−1.97%
1901	506	−0.35%

Year	Pop.	±% p.a.
1906	502	−0.16%
1911	526	+0.94%
1921	907	+5.60%
1926	1,753	+14.09%
1931	2,376	+6.27%
1936	1,508	−8.69%
1946	1,481	−0.18%
1954	1,721	+1.90%
1962	2,279	+3.57%
1968	2,631	+2.42%
1975	2,303	−1.88%
1982	2,191	−0.71%
1990	2,330	+0.77%
1999	3,092	+3.19%
2007	3,486	+1.51%
2012	3,393	−0.54%
2017	3,331	−0.37%
2023	3,285	−0.23%

Source: EHESS and INSEE (1968-2023)

== International relations ==
Froges is twinned with:

- Acquaviva, San Marino (1984)

== See also ==
- Communes of the Isère department
