= Goncelin =

- Commune
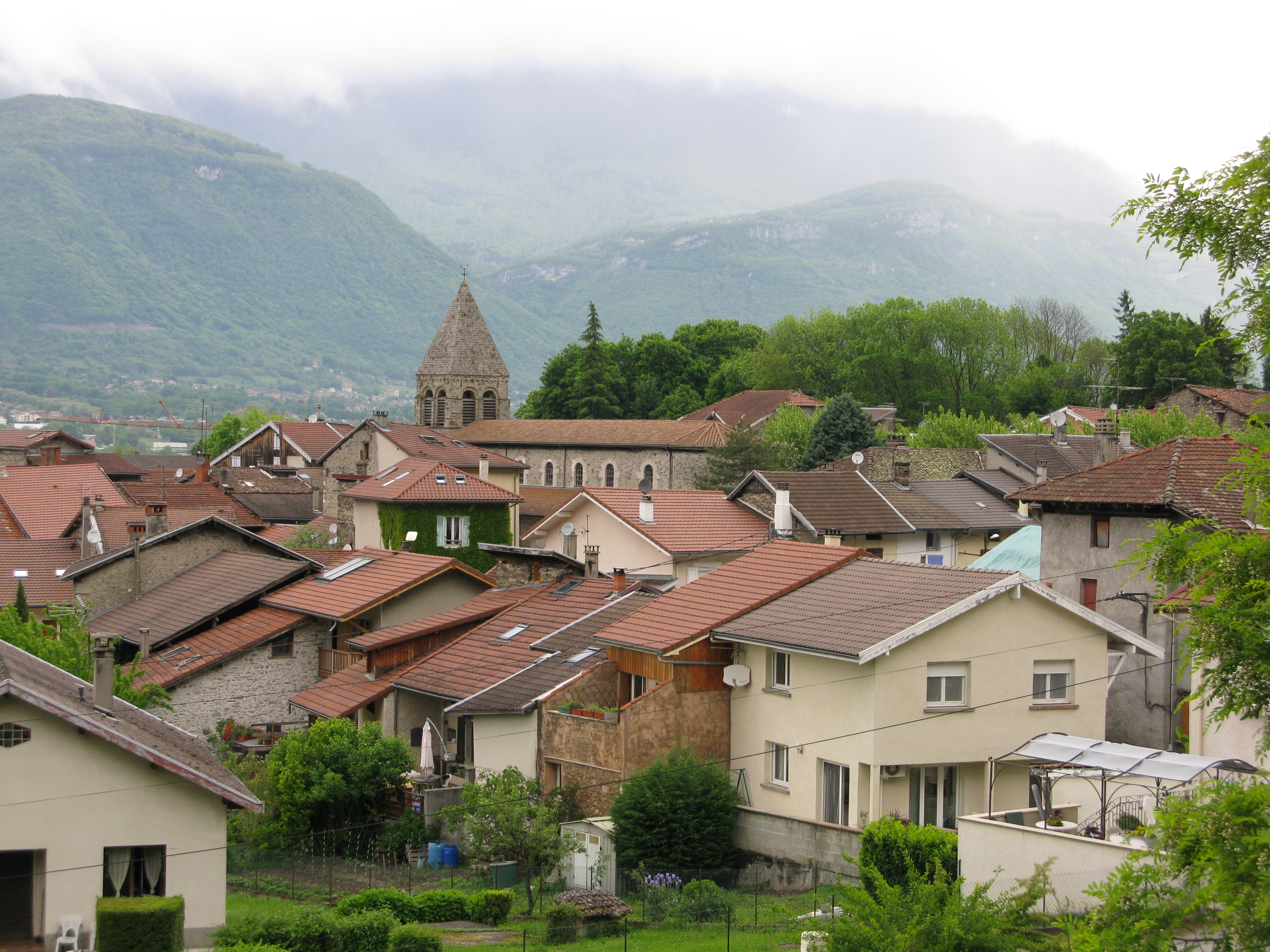
- The village of Goncelin

- Coat of arms
- Location of Goncelin
- Location within France Location within Auvergne-Rhône-Alpes
- Coordinates: 45°20′37″N 5°58′47″E
- Country: France
- Region: Auvergne-Rhône-Alpes
- Department: Isère
- Arrondissement: Grenoble
- Canton: Le Haut-Grésivaudan
- Intercommunality: CC Le Grésivaudan

Government
  - Mayor (2020–2026): Françoise Midali
- Area^{1}: 14 km^{2} (5.4 sq mi)
- Highest elevation: 1,278 m (4,193 ft)
- Lowest elevation: 235 m (771 ft)
- Population (2023): 2,400
  - Density: 170/km^{2} (440/sq mi)
- Time zone: UTC+01:00 (CET)
  - Summer (DST): UTC+02:00 (CEST)
- INSEE/Postal code: 38181 /38570
- ^{1} French Land Register data, which excludes lakes, ponds, glaciers > 1 km^{2} (0.386 sq mi or 247 acres) and river estuaries.

Goncelin (French pronunciation: [gɔ̃slˈɛ̃]) is a commune in the Isère department in the Auvergne-Rhône-Alpes region in Southeastern France.

== Population ==
Historical population

Year	Pop.	±% p.a.
1793	1,481	—
1800	1,553	+0.68%
1806	1,650	+1.01%
1821	1,641	−0.04%
1831	1,628	−0.08%
1836	1,642	+0.17%
1841	1,547	−1.18%
1846	1,636	+1.13%
1851	1,650	+0.17%
1856	1,602	−0.59%
1861	1,634	+0.40%
1866	1,587	−0.58%
1872	1,561	−0.27%
1876	1,513	−0.78%
1881	1,545	+0.42%
1886	1,524	−0.27%
1891	1,521	−0.04%
1896	1,505	−0.21%
1901	1,355	−2.08%

Year	Pop.	±% p.a.
1906	1,346	−0.13%
1911	1,255	−1.39%
1921	1,086	−1.44%
1926	1,087	+0.02%
1931	1,102	+0.27%
1936	983	−2.26%
1946	923	−0.63%
1954	950	+0.36%
1962	884	−0.90%
1968	1,136	+4.27%
1975	1,506	+4.11%
1982	1,467	−0.37%
1990	1,771	+2.38%
1999	1,937	+1.00%
2007	2,150	+1.31%
2012	2,238	+0.81%
2017	2,425	+1.62%
2023	2,400	−0.17%

Source: EHESS and INSEE (1968-2023)

== See also ==
- Communes of the Isère department
