= Le Touvet =

- Commune
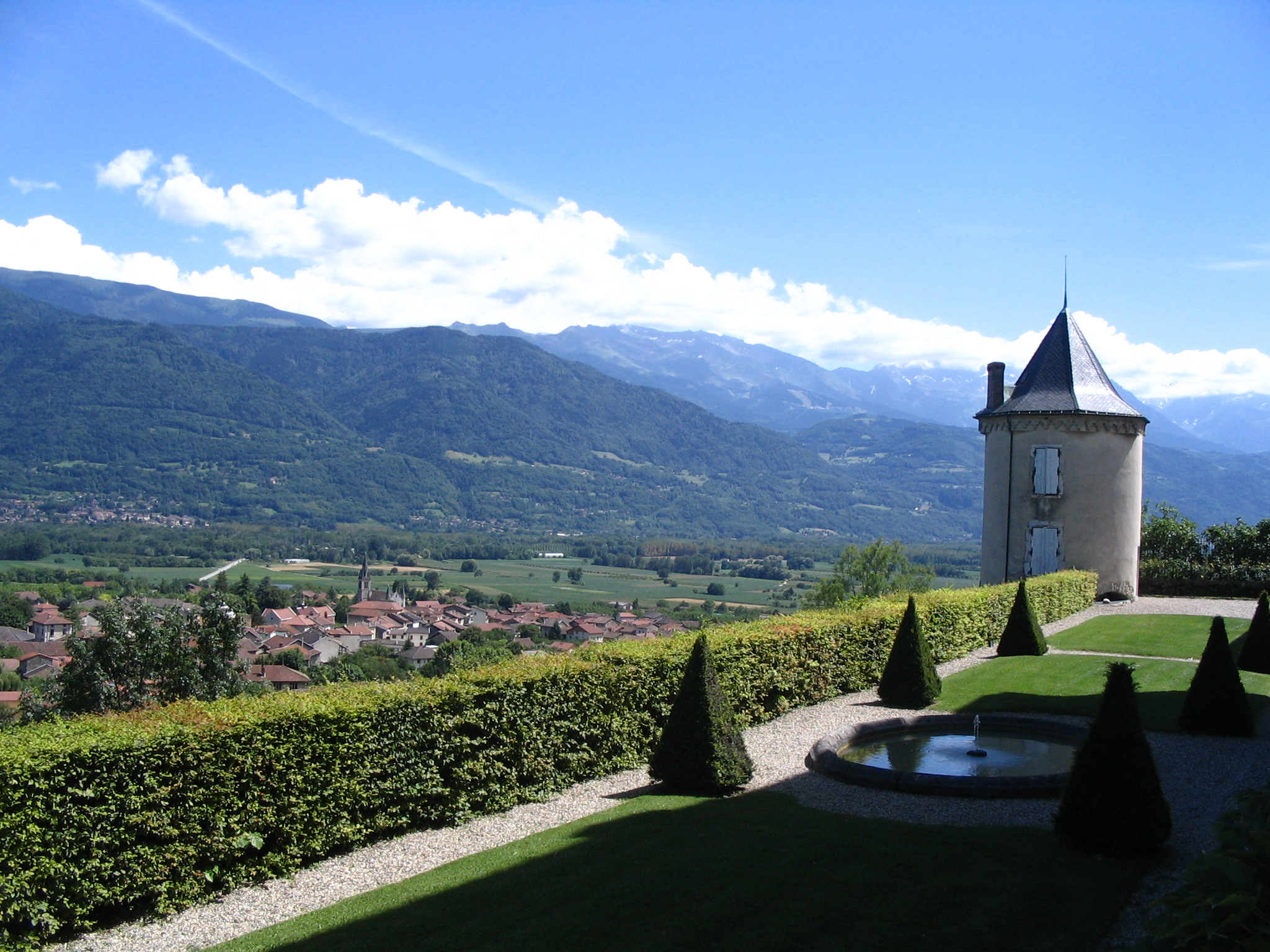
- Le Touvet seen from the chateau

- Coat of arms
- Location of Le Touvet
- Location within France Location within Auvergne-Rhône-Alpes
- Coordinates: 45°21′30″N 5°56′55″E
- Country: France
- Region: Auvergne-Rhône-Alpes
- Department: Isère
- Arrondissement: Grenoble
- Canton: Le Haut-Grésivaudan
- Intercommunality: CC Le Grésivaudan

Government
  - Mayor (2024–2026): Adrian Raffin
- Area^{1}: 11.6 km^{2} (4.5 sq mi)
- Highest elevation: 1,008 m (3,307 ft)
- Lowest elevation: 236 m (774 ft)
- Population (2023): 3,116
  - Density: 269/km^{2} (696/sq mi)
- Time zone: UTC+01:00 (CET)
  - Summer (DST): UTC+02:00 (CEST)
- INSEE/Postal code: 38511 /38660
- ^{1} French Land Register data, which excludes lakes, ponds, glaciers > 1 km^{2} (0.386 sq mi or 247 acres) and river estuaries.

Le Touvet (French pronunciation: [lə tuvɛ]) is a commune in the Isère department in southeastern France.

== Population ==
Historical population

Year	Pop.	±% p.a.
1793	1,082	—
1821	1,438	+1.02%
1846	1,714	+0.70%
1872	1,595	−0.28%
1901	1,299	−0.71%
1926	1,005	−1.02%
1946	954	−0.26%
1962	1,115	+0.98%
1968	1,278	+2.30%

Year	Pop.	±% p.a.
1975	1,562	+2.91%
1982	1,857	+2.50%
1990	2,229	+2.31%
1999	2,824	+2.66%
2007	2,987	+0.70%
2012	3,003	+0.11%
2017	3,229	+1.46%
2023	3,116	−0.59%

Source: EHESS and INSEE (1968-2023)

== See also ==
- Communes of the Isère department
