= Saint-Pierre =

Saint-Pierre (French, 'Saint Peter', pronounced [sɛ̃ pjɛʁ]) may refer to:

== Buildings and churches ==
- Fort Saint Pierre, Ontario, Canada
- Church of Saint-Pierre, Caen, Normandy, France
- Église Saint-Pierre le Vieux (Old Saint Peter's Church, Strasbourg), Strasbourg, France
- Saint-Pierre, Firminy, France, designed by Le Corbusier
- Saint-Pierre de Montrouge, Paris, France
- Saint-Pierre-le-Jeune Protestant Church, Strasbourg, France
- Church of SS Peter and Paul, Istanbul (Saint-Pierre Church), Beyoğlu]m, Istanbul, Turkey
- Saint Pierre Han, Beyoğlu, Istanbul, Turkey

== Places ==
=== Canada ===
==== Manitoba ====
- St-Pierre-Jolys, a village

==== Quebec ====
- Saint-Pierre, Quebec, in Joliette Regional County Municipality
- Saint-Pierre-Baptiste, Quebec
- Saint-Pierre-de-Broughton, Quebec
- Saint-Pierre-de-Lamy
- Saint-Pierre-de-la-Rivière-du-Sud, Quebec
- Saint-Pierre-de-l'Île-d'Orléans, known simply as Saint-Pierre until 1997
- Saint-Pierre-de-Véronne-à-Pike-River, Quebec, now called Pike River
- Saint-Pierre-de-Wakefield, part of Val-des-Monts
- Saint-Pierre-les-Becquets, Quebec
- Havre-Saint-Pierre
- Lake Saint Pierre, a lake on the Saint Lawrence River below Montreal
- Lac Saint-Pierre, now subsumed by Lachine Canal, Montreal
- Mont-Saint-Pierre, Quebec
- Ville Saint-Pierre, Montreal

=== France ===
==== Mainland France ====
- Saint-Pierre, Alpes-de-Haute-Provence
- Saint-Pierre, Cantal
- Saint-Pierre, Haute-Garonne
- Saint-Pierre, Jura
- Saint-Pierre, Marne
- Saint-Pierre, Bas-Rhin
- Saint-Pierre-à-Arnes, in the Ardennes département
- Saint-Pierre-Aigle, in the Aisne département
- Saint-Pierre-Avez, in the Hautes-Alpes département
- Saint-Pierre-Azif, in the Calvados département
- Saint-Pierre-Bellevue, in the Creuse département
- Saint-Pierre-Bénouville, in the Seine-Maritime département
- Saint-Pierre-Bois, in the Bas-Rhin département
- Saint-Pierre-Brouck, in the Nord département
- Saint-Pierre-Canivet, in the Calvados département
- Saint-Pierre-Chérignat, in the Creuse département
- Saint-Pierre-Colamine, in the Puy-de-Dôme département
- Saint-Pierre-d'Albigny, in the Savoie département
- Saint-Pierre-d'Allevard, in the Isère département
- Saint-Pierre-d'Alvey, in the Savoie département
- Saint-Pierre-d'Amilly, in the Charente-Maritime département
- Saint-Pierre-d'Argençon, in the Hautes-Alpes département
- Saint-Pierre-d'Arthéglise, in the Manche département
- Saint-Pierre-d'Aubézies, in the Gers département
- Saint-Pierre-d'Aurillac, in the Gironde département
- Saint-Pierre-d'Autils, in the Eure département
- Saint-Pierre-de-Bailleul, in the Eure département
- Saint-Pierre-de-Bat, in the Gironde département
- Saint-Pierre-de-Belleville, in the Savoie département
- Saint-Pierre-de-Bœuf, in the Loire département
- Saint-Pierre-de-Bressieux, in the Isère département
- Saint-Pierre-de-Buzet, in the Lot-et-Garonne département
- Saint-Pierre-de-Cernières, in the Eure département
- Saint-Pierre-de-Chandieu, in the Rhône département
- Saint-Pierre-de-Chartreuse, in the Isère département
- Saint-Pierre-de-Chérennes, in the Isère département
- Saint-Pierre-de-Chevillé, in the Sarthe département
- Saint-Pierre-de-Chignac, in the Dordogne département
- Saint-Pierre-de-Clairac, in the Lot-et-Garonne département
- Saint-Pierre-de-Côle, in the Dordogne département
- Saint-Pierre-de-Colombier, in the Ardèche département
- Saint-Pierre-de-Cormeilles, in the Eure département
- Saint-Pierre-de-Coutances, in the Manche département
- Saint-Pierre-de-Curtille, in the Savoie département
- Saint-Pierre-de-Frugie, in the Dordogne département
- Saint-Pierre-de-Fursac, in the Creuse département
- Saint-Pierre-de-Genebroz, in the Savoie département
- Saint-Pierre-de-Jards, in the Indre département
- Saint-Pierre-de-Juillers, in the Charente-Maritime département
- Saint-Pierre-de-la-Fage, in the Hérault département
- Saint-Pierre-de-Lages, in the Haute-Garonne département
- Saint-Pierre-de-Lamps, in the Indre département
- Saint-Pierre-de-l'Isle, in the Charente-Maritime département
- Saint-Pierre-dels-Forcats, in the Pyrénées-Orientales département
- Saint-Pierre-de-Maillé, in the Vienne département
- Saint-Pierre-de-Mailloc, in the Calvados département
- Saint-Pierre-de-Manneville, in the Seine-Maritime département
- Saint-Pierre-de-Méaroz, in the Isère département
- Saint-Pierre-de-Mésage, in the Isère département
- Saint-Pierre-de-Mézoargues, in the Bouches-du-Rhône département
- Saint-Pierre-de-Mons, in the Gironde département
- Saint-Pierre-de-Nogaret, in the Lozère département
- Saint-Pierre-d'Entremont, Isère, in the Isère département
- Saint-Pierre-d'Entremont, Orne, in the Orne département
- Saint-Pierre-d'Entremont, Savoie, in the Savoie département
- Saint-Pierre-de-Plesguen, in the Ille-et-Vilaine département
- Saint-Pierre-de-Rivière, in the Ariège département
- Saint-Pierre-de-Salerne, in the Eure département
- Saint-Pierre-des-Bois, in the Sarthe département
- Saint-Pierre-des-Champs, in the Aude département
- Saint-Pierre-des-Corps, in the Indre-et-Loire département
- Saint-Pierre-des-Échaubrognes, in the Deux-Sèvres département
- Saint-Pierre-de-Semilly, in the Manche département
- Saint-Pierre-des-Fleurs, in the Eure département
- Saint-Pierre-des-Ifs, Calvados, in the Calvados département
- Saint-Pierre-des-Ifs, Eure, in the Eure département
- Saint-Pierre-des-Jonquières, in the Seine-Maritime département
- Saint-Pierre-des-Landes, in the Mayenne département
- Saint-Pierre-des-Loges, in the Orne département
- Saint-Pierre-des-Nids, in the Mayenne département
- Saint-Pierre-des-Ormes, in the Sarthe département
- Saint-Pierre-de-Soucy, in the Savoie département
- Saint-Pierre-des-Tripiers, in the Lozère département
- Saint-Pierre-de-Trivisy, in the Tarn département
- Saint-Pierre-de-Varengeville, in the Seine-Maritime département
- Saint-Pierre-de-Varennes, in the Saône-et-Loire département
- Saint-Pierre-de-Vassols, in the Vaucluse département
- Saint-Pierre-d'Exideuil, in the Vienne département
- Saint-Pierre-d'Eyraud, in the Dordogne département
- Saint-Pierre-d'Irube, in the Pyrénées-Atlantiques département, near Bayonne
- Saint-Pierre-d'Oléron, in the Charente-Maritime département
- Saint-Pierre-du-Bosguérard, in the Eure département
- Saint-Pierre-du-Bû, in the Calvados département
- Saint-Pierre-du-Champ, in the Haute-Loire département
- Saint-Pierre-du-Chemin, in the Vendée département
- Saint-Pierre-du-Fresne, in the Calvados département
- Saint-Pierre-du-Jonquet, in the Calvados département
- Saint-Pierre-du-Lorouër, in the Sarthe département
- Saint-Pierre-du-Mesnil, in the Eure département
- Saint-Pierre-du-Mont, Calvados, in the Calvados département
- Saint-Pierre-du-Mont, Landes, in the Landes département
- Saint-Pierre-du-Mont, Nièvre, in the Nièvre département
- Saint-Pierre-du-Palais, in the Charente-Maritime département
- Saint-Pierre-du-Perray, in the Essonne département
- Saint-Pierre-du-Regard, in the Orne département
- Saint-Pierre-du-Val, in the Eure département
- Saint-Pierre-du-Vauvray, in the Eure département
- Saint-Pierre-Église, in the Manche département
- Saint-Pierre-en-Faucigny, in the Haute-Savoie département
- Saint-Pierre-en-Port, in the Seine-Maritime département
- Saint-Pierre-en-Val, in the Seine-Maritime département
- Saint-Pierre-en-Vaux, in the Côte-d'Or département
- Saint-Pierre-es-Champs, in the Oise département
- Saint-Pierre-Eynac, in the Haute-Loire département
- Saint-Pierre-la-Bourlhonne, in the Puy-de-Dôme département
- Saint-Pierre-la-Bruyère, in the Orne département
- Saint-Pierre-la-Cour, in the Mayenne département
- Saint-Pierre-Lafeuille, in the Lot département
- Saint-Pierre-la-Garenne, in the Eure département
- Saint-Pierre-Langers, in the Manche département
- Saint-Pierre-la-Noaille, in the Loire département
- Saint-Pierre-la-Palud, in the Rhône département
- Saint-Pierre-la-Rivière, in the Orne département
- Saint-Pierre-la-Roche, in the Ardèche département
- Saint-Pierre-Laval, in the Allier département
- Saint-Pierre-la-Vieille, in the Calvados département
- Saint-Pierre-Lavis, in the Seine-Maritime département
- Saint-Pierre-le-Bost, in the Creuse département
- Saint-Pierre-le-Chastel, in the Puy-de-Dôme département
- Saint-Pierre-le-Moûtier, in the Nièvre département
- Saint-Pierre-lès-Bitry, in the Oise département
- Saint-Pierre-les-Bois, in the Cher département
- Saint-Pierre-lès-Elbeuf, in the Seine-Maritime département
- Saint-Pierre-les-Étieux, in the Cher département
- Saint-Pierre-lès-Franqueville, in the Aisne département
- Saint-Pierre-lès-Nemours, in the Seine-et-Marne département
- Saint-Pierre-le-Vieux, Lozère, in the Lozère département
- Saint-Pierre-le-Vieux, Saône-et-Loire, in the Saône-et-Loire département
- Saint-Pierre-le-Vieux, Seine-Maritime, in the Seine-Maritime département
- Saint-Pierre-le-Vieux, Vendée, in the Vendée département
- Saint-Pierre-le-Viger, in the Seine-Maritime département
- Saint-Pierre-Montlimart, in the Maine-et-Loire département
- Saint-Pierre-Quiberon, in the Morbihan département
- Saint-Pierre-Roche, in the Puy-de-Dôme département
- Saint-Pierre-Saint-Jean, in the Ardèche département
- Saint-Pierre-sur-Dives, in the Calvados département
- Saint-Pierre-sur-Doux, in the Ardèche département
- Saint-Pierre-sur-Dropt, in the Lot-et-Garonne département
- Saint-Pierre-sur-Erve, in the Mayenne département
- Saint-Pierre-sur-Orthe, in the Mayenne département
- Saint-Pierre-sur-Vence, in the Ardennes département
- Saint-Pierre-Tarentaine, in the Calvados département
- Saint-Pierre-Toirac, in the Lot département

==== French overseas territories ====
- Saint Pierre and Miquelon, an overseas collectivity of France in the north-western Atlantic Ocean
  - Saint Pierre Island
    - Saint-Pierre, Saint Pierre and Miquelon
- Saint-Pierre, Martinique
- Saint-Pierre, Réunion

=== Other countries ===
- Saint-Pierre, Ouest, Haiti
- Saint-Pierre, Aosta Valley, Italy
- Saint Pierre, Mauritius
- St. Pierre Island, Farquhar, Seychelles
- St. Pierre Island, Praslin, Seychelles
- St Pierre, Monmouthshire, Wales, UK
- St. Pierre, Montana, US
- Bourg-Saint-Pierre, Valais, Switzerland
- Fort St. Pierre Site, Mississippi, US
- St. Peter's Island (Île Saint-Pierre), Lake Biel, Bern, Switzerland
- Woluwe-Saint-Pierre, or Sint-Pieters-Woluwe, Belgium

== Transportation ==
- Air Saint-Pierre, an airline based in Saint Pierre and Miquelon
- Saint-Pierre Airport, in Saint Pierre and Miquelon
- Havre Saint-Pierre Airport, in Quebec, Canada
- Saint-Pierre-du-Mont Airfield, in Calvados department, France
- Saint-Pierre – Pierrefonds Airport, Réunion
- HMS Saint Pierre, a French ship captured by the Royal Navy
- MV St Pierre, formerly Empire Seagreen, a British ship

== Sports ==
- Saint Pierre and Miquelon national football team
- US Saint-Pierre-des-Corps, a French football club

== Other uses ==
- Saint-Pierre (surname), including a list of people with the name Saint-Pierre or variants
- Saint Pierre (grape), or Saint-Pierre Doré
- John Dory, or Saint-Pierre, a fish
- Canal de Saint-Pierre, in Toulousse, France
- Château Saint-Pierre, a winery in the Bordeaux region of France
- Battle of Saint-Pierre, in 1776, near Quebec City, Canada
- Saint-Pierre (TV series), a Canadian police procedural television series
- St Pierre, a Manchester-based UK bakery owned since 2022 by Grupo Bimbo

== See also ==
- Pierre (disambiguation)
- La Rue-Saint-Pierre (disambiguation)
- Saint-Pierre-des-Ifs (disambiguation)
- Saint-Pierre-du-Mont (disambiguation)
- Saint Pierre River (disambiguation)
- de Saint-Pierre, a surname, including a list of people with the name
