= Saint-Pierre-du-Mont =

Saint-Pierre-du-Mont may refer to several communes in France:

- Saint-Pierre-du-Mont, Calvados, in the Calvados département
- Saint-Pierre-du-Mont, Landes, in the Landes département
- Saint-Pierre-du-Mont, Nièvre, in the Nièvre département
