= Saint-Pierre-des-Ifs =

Saint-Pierre-des-Ifs may refer to:

- Saint-Pierre-des-Ifs, Calvados, France
- Saint-Pierre-des-Ifs, Eure, France
