= Malrevers =

- Commune
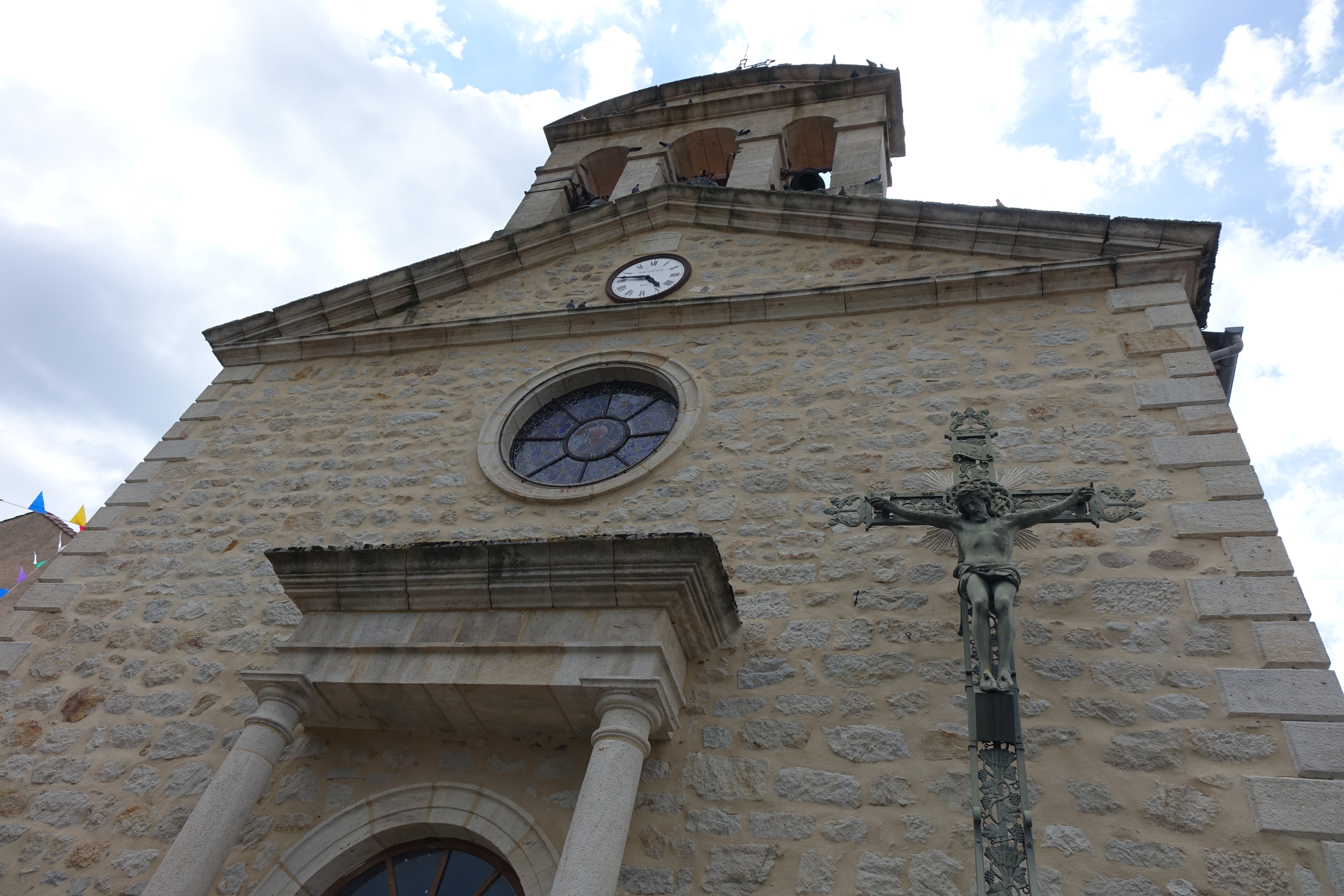
- Location of Malrevers
- Location within France Location within Auvergne-Rhône-Alpes
- Coordinates: 45°05′56″N 3°58′01″E
- Country: France
- Region: Auvergne-Rhône-Alpes
- Department: Haute-Loire
- Arrondissement: Le Puy-en-Velay
- Canton: Emblavez-et-Meygal
- Intercommunality: CA du Puy-en-Velay

Government
  - Mayor (2020–2026): Gilles Oger
- Area^{1}: 14.09 km^{2} (5.44 sq mi)
- Elevation: 560 m (1,840 ft)
- Highest elevation: 920 m (3,020 ft)
- Lowest elevation: 591 m (1,939 ft)
- Population (2023): 763
  - Density: 54.2/km^{2} (140/sq mi)
- Time zone: UTC+01:00 (CET)
  - Summer (DST): UTC+02:00 (CEST)
- INSEE/Postal code: 43126 /43800
- ^{1} French Land Register data, which excludes lakes, ponds, glaciers > 1 km^{2} (0.386 sq mi or 247 acres) and river estuaries.

Malrevers (French pronunciation: [malʁəvɛʁ]) is a commune in the Haute-Loire department in south-central France.

== Population ==
Historical population
Year	Pop.	±% p.a.
1968	435	—
1975	441	+0.20%
1982	520	+2.38%
1990	592	+1.63%
1999	691	+1.73%
2007	718	+0.48%
2012	730	+0.33%
2017	754	+0.65%
2023	763	+0.20%
Source: INSEE

== See also ==
- Communes of the Haute-Loire department
