= Chamalières-sur-Loire =

- Commune
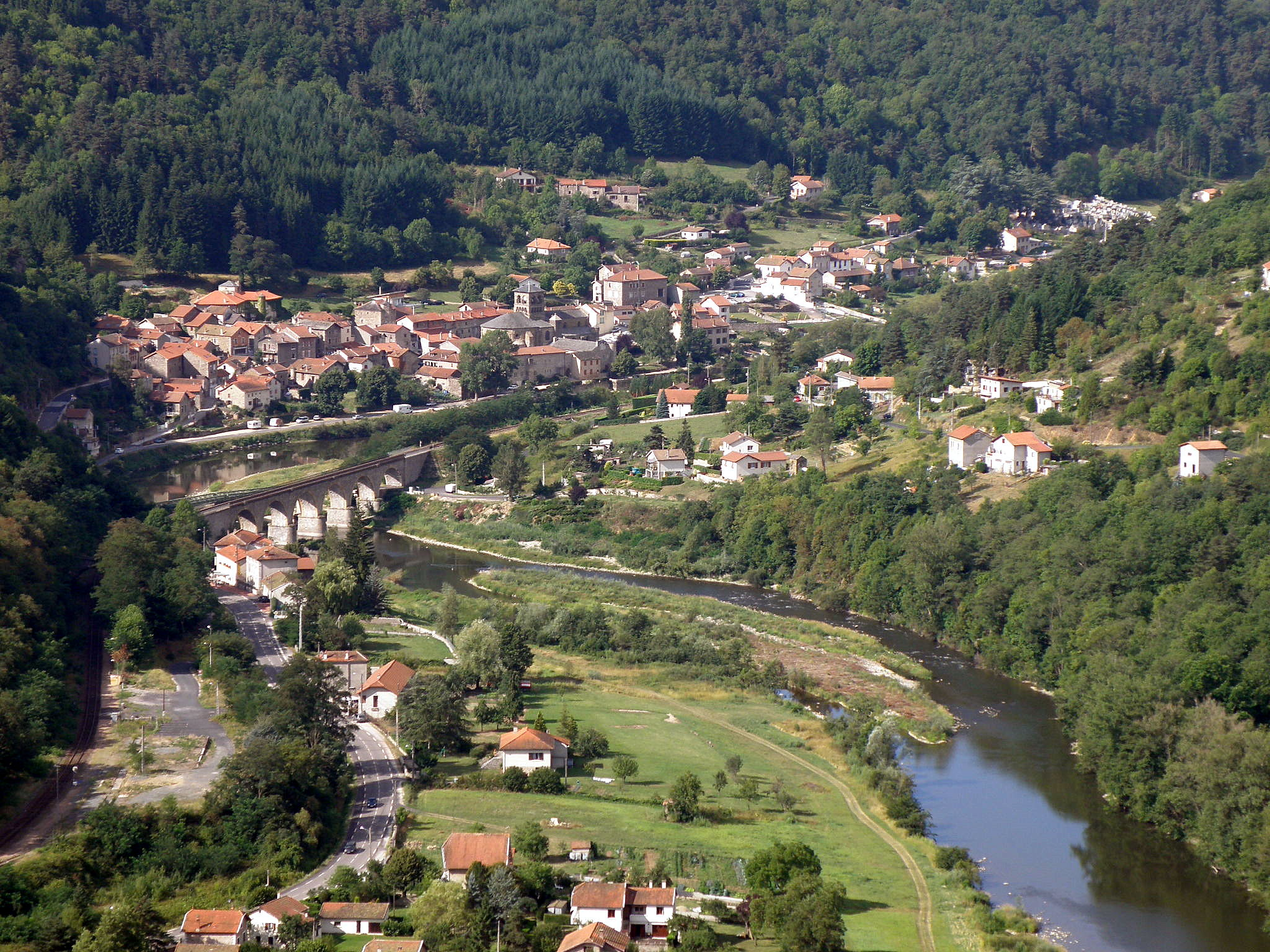
- Location of Chamalières-sur-Loire
- Location within France Location within Auvergne-Rhône-Alpes
- Coordinates: 45°12′07″N 3°59′11″E
- Country: France
- Region: Auvergne-Rhône-Alpes
- Department: Haute-Loire
- Arrondissement: Le Puy-en-Velay
- Canton: Emblavez-et-Meygal
- Intercommunality: CA du Puy-en-Velay

Government
  - Mayor (2020–2026): Éric Valour
- Area^{1}: 13.4 km^{2} (5.2 sq mi)
- Elevation: 522 m (1,713 ft)
- Highest elevation: 984 m (3,228 ft)
- Lowest elevation: 495 m (1,624 ft)
- Population (2023): 506
  - Density: 37.8/km^{2} (97.8/sq mi)
- Time zone: UTC+01:00 (CET)
  - Summer (DST): UTC+02:00 (CEST)
- INSEE/Postal code: 43049 /43800
- ^{1} French Land Register data, which excludes lakes, ponds, glaciers > 1 km^{2} (0.386 sq mi or 247 acres) and river estuaries.

Chamalières-sur-Loire (French pronunciation: [ʃamaljɛʁ syʁ lwaʁ], literally Chamalières on Loire; Occitan: Chamaleiras) is a commune in the Haute-Loire department in south-central France.

== Population ==
Historical population
Year	Pop.	±% p.a.
1968	471	—
1975	478	+0.21%
1982	429	−1.53%
1990	385	−1.34%
1999	407	+0.62%
2007	437	+0.89%
2012	482	+1.98%
2017	491	+0.37%
2023	506	+0.50%
Source: INSEE

== See also ==
- Communes of the Haute-Loire department
