= Morêtel-de-Mailles =

- Part of Crêts-en-Belledonne
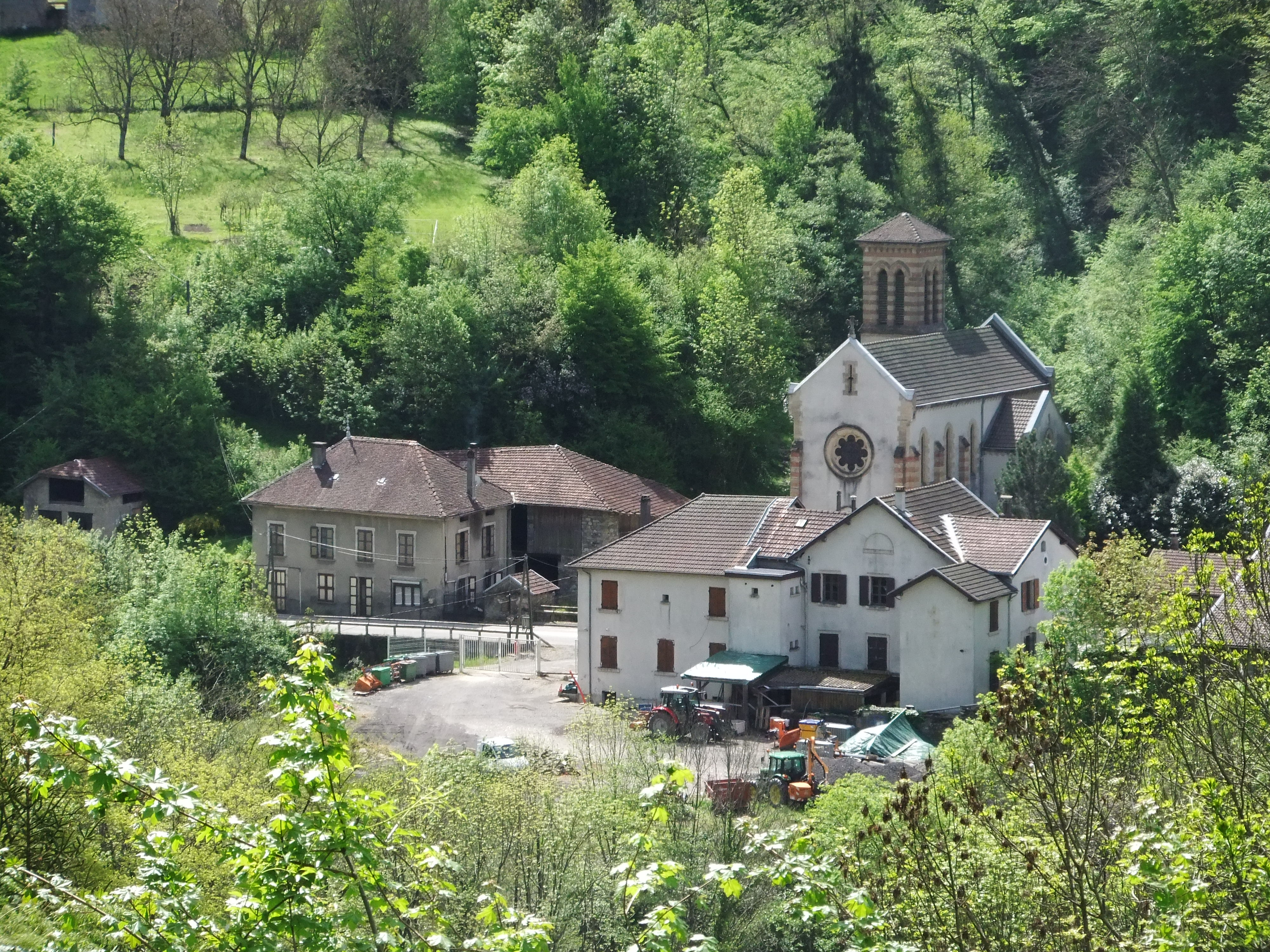
- Location of Morêtel-de-Mailles
- Location within France Location within Auvergne-Rhône-Alpes
- Coordinates: 45°21′41″N 6°00′01″E
- Country: France
- Region: Auvergne-Rhône-Alpes
- Department: Isère
- Arrondissement: Grenoble
- Canton: Le Haut-Grésivaudan
- Commune: Crêts-en-Belledonne
- Area^{1}: 7 km^{2} (2.7 sq mi)
- Elevation: 460 m (1,510 ft)
- Highest elevation: 1,178 m (3,865 ft)
- Lowest elevation: 250 m (820 ft)
- Population (2019): 480
  - Density: 69/km^{2} (180/sq mi)
- Time zone: UTC+01:00 (CET)
  - Summer (DST): UTC+02:00 (CEST)
- Postal code: 38570
- ^{1} French Land Register data, which excludes lakes, ponds, glaciers > 1 km^{2} (0.386 sq mi or 247 acres) and river estuaries.

Morêtel-de-Mailles (French pronunciation: [mɔʁɛtɛl də maj]) is a former commune in the Isère department in southeastern France. On 1 January 2016, it was merged into the new commune of Crêts-en-Belledonne.

== See also ==
- Communes of the Isère department
