= Queyrières =

- Commune
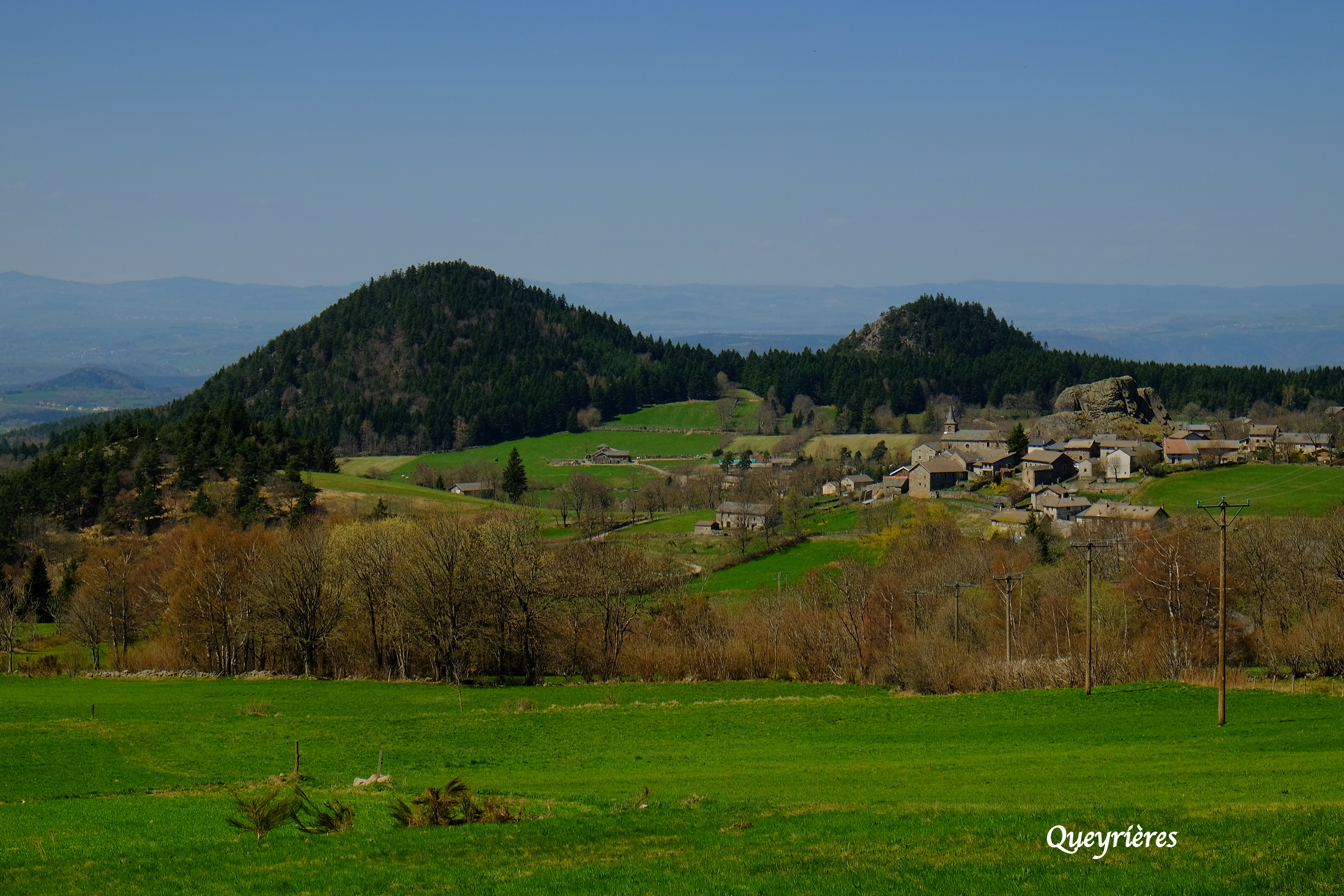
- Location of Queyrières
- Location within France Location within Auvergne-Rhône-Alpes
- Coordinates: 45°04′23″N 4°05′56″E
- Country: France
- Region: Auvergne-Rhône-Alpes
- Department: Haute-Loire
- Arrondissement: Le Puy-en-Velay
- Canton: Emblavez-et-Meygal

Government
  - Mayor (2020–2026): Jean-Pierre Sabatier
- Area^{1}: 13.95 km^{2} (5.39 sq mi)
- Elevation: 1,100 m (3,600 ft)
- Highest elevation: 1,436 m (4,711 ft)
- Lowest elevation: 949 m (3,114 ft)
- Population (2023): 363
  - Density: 26.0/km^{2} (67.4/sq mi)
- Time zone: UTC+01:00 (CET)
  - Summer (DST): UTC+02:00 (CEST)
- INSEE/Postal code: 43158 /43260
- ^{1} French Land Register data, which excludes lakes, ponds, glaciers > 1 km^{2} (0.386 sq mi or 247 acres) and river estuaries.

Queyrières (French pronunciation: [kɛʁjɛʁ]; Occitan: Cairièras) is a commune in the Haute-Loire department in south-central France.

== Population ==
Historical population
| Year | Pop. | ±% p.a. |
|---|---|---|
| 1968 | 331 | — |
| 1975 | 261 | −3.34% |
| 1982 | 212 | −2.93% |
| 1990 | 232 | +1.13% |
| 1999 | 285 | +2.31% |
| 2007 | 315 | +1.26% |
| 2012 | 313 | −0.13% |
| 2017 | 305 | −0.52% |
| 2023 | 363 | +2.94% |
Source: INSEE

== See also ==
- Communes of the Haute-Loire department
