= Saint-Julien-Chapteuil =

- Commune
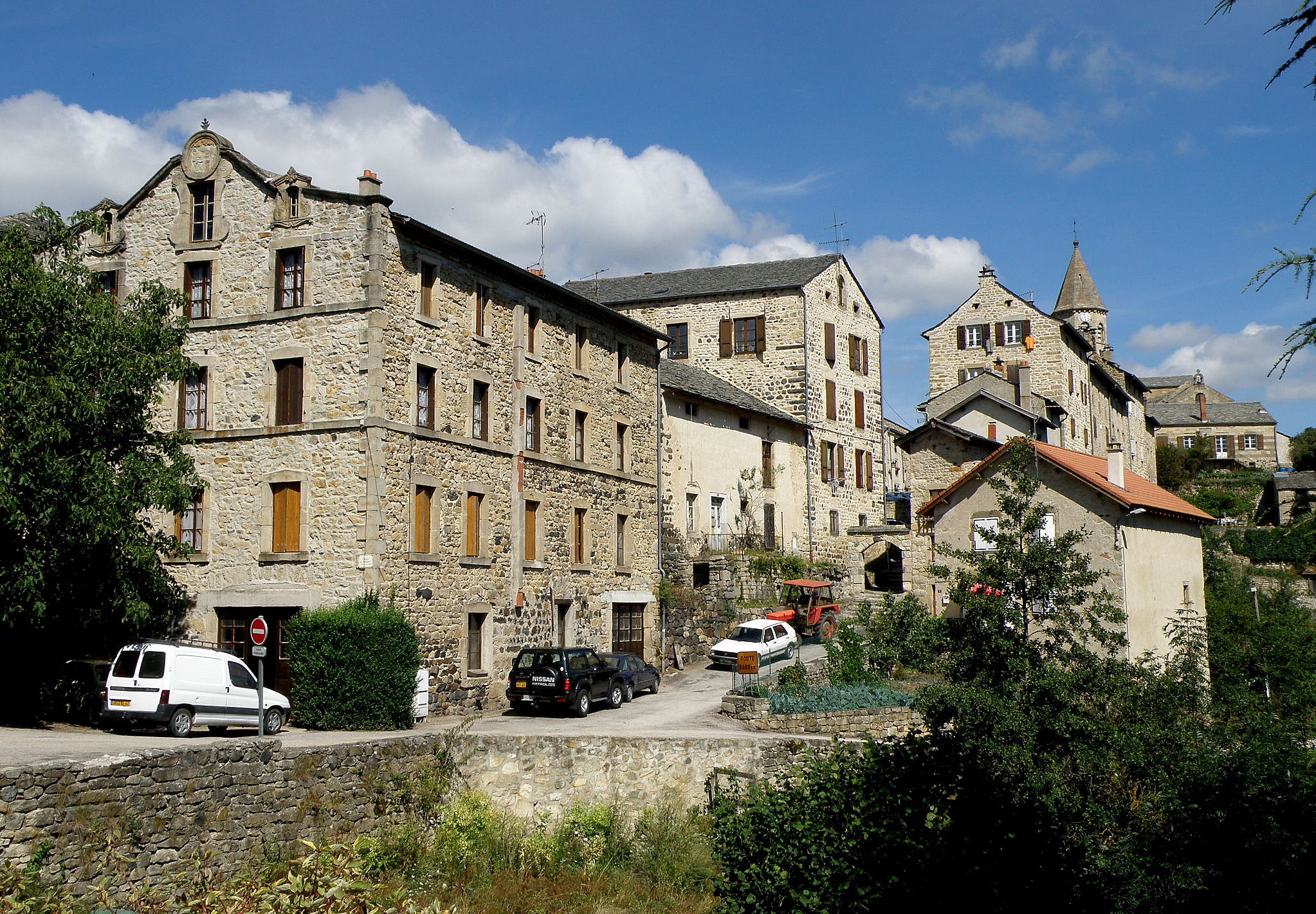

- Coat of arms
- Location of Saint-Julien-Chapteuil
- Location within France Location within Auvergne-Rhône-Alpes
- Coordinates: 45°02′09″N 4°03′42″E
- Country: France
- Region: Auvergne-Rhône-Alpes
- Department: Haute-Loire
- Arrondissement: Le Puy-en-Velay
- Canton: Emblavez-et-Meygal

Government
  - Mayor (2020–2026): André Ferret
- Area^{1}: 28.26 km^{2} (10.91 sq mi)
- Elevation: 821 m (2,694 ft)
- Highest elevation: 1,408 m (4,619 ft)
- Lowest elevation: 771 m (2,530 ft)
- Population (2023): 2,019
  - Density: 71.44/km^{2} (185.0/sq mi)
- Time zone: UTC+01:00 (CET)
  - Summer (DST): UTC+02:00 (CEST)
- INSEE/Postal code: 43200 /43260
- ^{1} French Land Register data, which excludes lakes, ponds, glaciers > 1 km^{2} (0.386 sq mi or 247 acres) and river estuaries.

Saint-Julien-Chapteuil (French pronunciation: [sɛ̃ ʒyljɛ̃ ʃaptœj]; Auvergnat: Sant Julian e Chaptuèlh) is a commune in the Haute-Loire department in south-central France.

== Population ==
Historical population

Year	Pop.	±% p.a.
1793	2,205	—
1821	2,440	+0.36%
1846	2,620	+0.29%
1872	3,144	+0.70%
1901	3,384	+0.25%
1926	2,384	−1.39%
1946	2,105	−0.62%
1962	1,762	−1.11%
1968	1,646	−1.13%

Year	Pop.	±% p.a.
1975	1,499	−1.33%
1982	1,569	+0.65%
1990	1,664	+0.74%
1999	1,804	+0.90%
2007	1,874	+0.48%
2012	1,873	−0.01%
2017	1,920	+0.50%
2023	2,019	+0.84%

Source: EHESS and INSEE (1968-2023)

== See also ==
- Communes of the Haute-Loire department
