= Rosières, Haute-Loire =

Rosières
- Commune
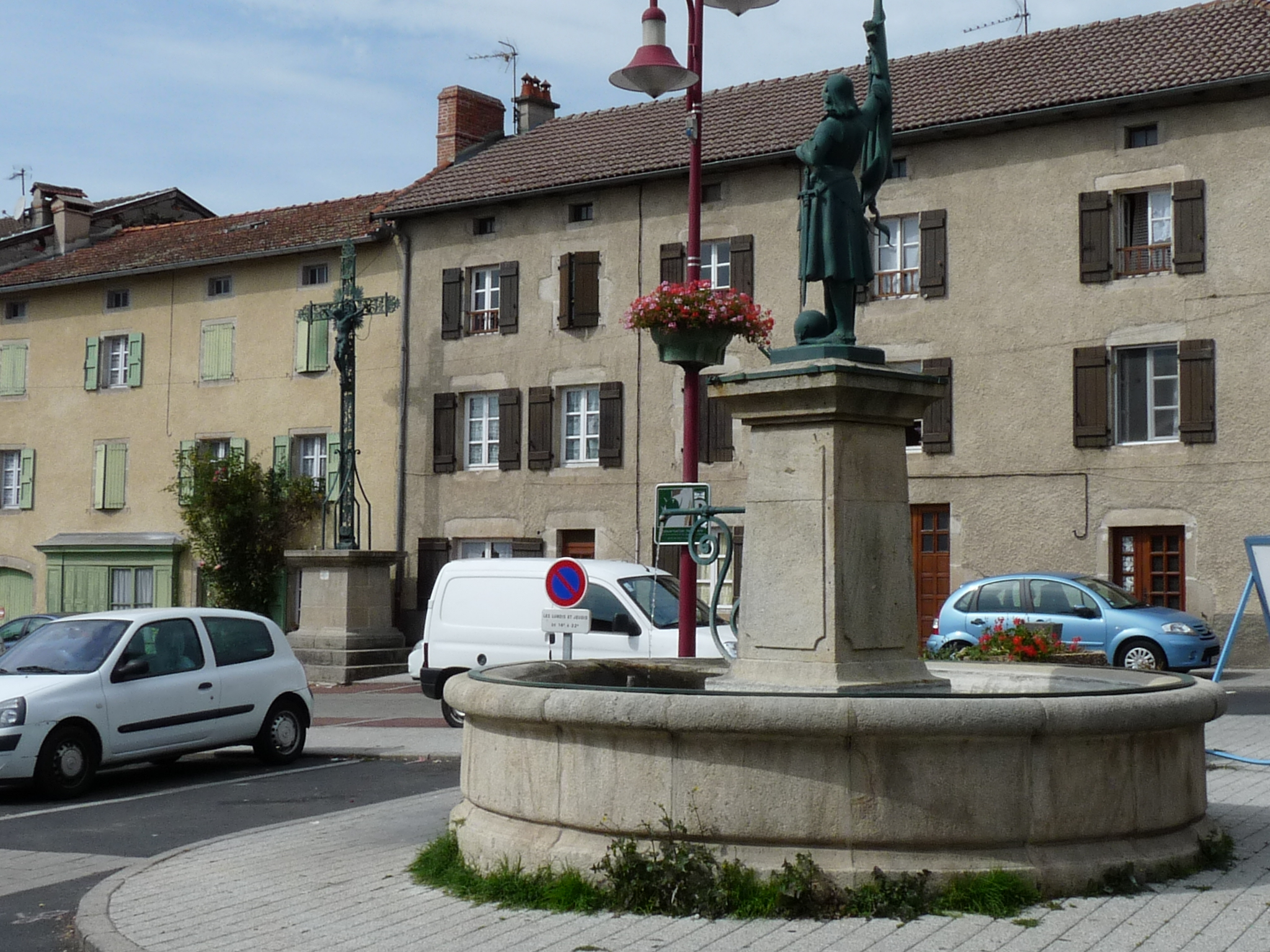
- Jeanne d'Arc Square
- Location of Rosières
- Location within France Location within Auvergne-Rhône-Alpes
- Coordinates: 45°08′01″N 3°59′20″E
- Country: France
- Region: Auvergne-Rhône-Alpes
- Department: Haute-Loire
- Arrondissement: Le Puy-en-Velay
- Canton: Emblavez-et-Meygal
- Intercommunality: CA du Puy-en-Velay

Government
  - Mayor (2020–2026): Fanny Sabatier
- Area^{1}: 26.82 km^{2} (10.36 sq mi)
- Elevation: 640 m (2,100 ft)
- Highest elevation: 1,072 m (3,517 ft)
- Lowest elevation: 594 m (1,949 ft)
- Population (2023): 1,548
  - Density: 57.72/km^{2} (149.5/sq mi)
- Time zone: UTC+01:00 (CET)
  - Summer (DST): UTC+02:00 (CEST)
- INSEE/Postal code: 43165 /43800
- ^{1} French Land Register data, which excludes lakes, ponds, glaciers > 1 km^{2} (0.386 sq mi or 247 acres) and river estuaries.

Rosières (French pronunciation: [ʁozjɛʁ]; Occitan: Rosèiras) is a commune in the Haute-Loire department in south-central France.

== Population ==
Historical population
Year	Pop.	±% p.a.
1968	1,284	—
1975	1,163	−1.40%
1982	1,212	+0.59%
1990	1,305	+0.93%
1999	1,309	+0.03%
2007	1,424	+1.06%
2012	1,494	+0.96%
2017	1,528	+0.45%
2023	1,548	+0.22%
Source: INSEE

== See also ==
- Communes of the Haute-Loire department
