= Saint-Martin-de-Lamps =

- Part of Levroux
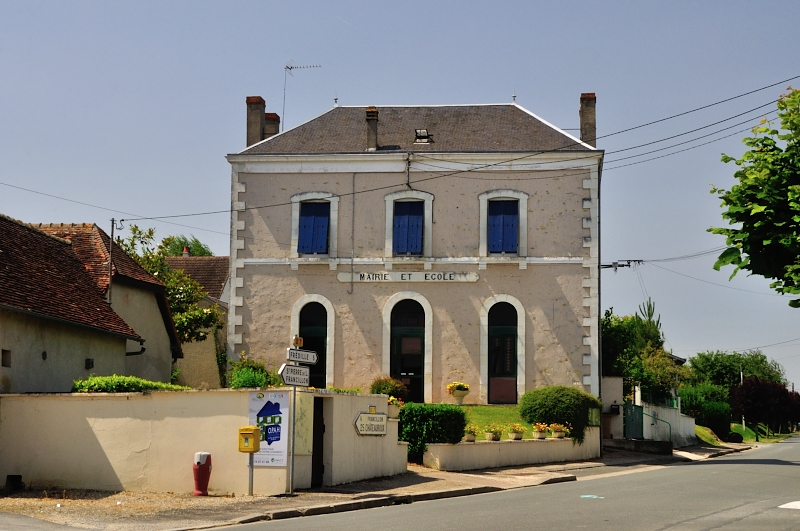
- The town hall in Saint-Martin-de-Lamps
- Location of Saint-Martin-de-Lamps
- Location within France Location within Centre-Val de Loire
- Coordinates: 46°59′27″N 1°31′33″E
- Country: France
- Region: Centre-Val de Loire
- Department: Indre
- Arrondissement: Châteauroux
- Canton: Levroux
- Commune: Levroux
- Area^{1}: 15.61 km^{2} (6.03 sq mi)
- Elevation: 141 m (463 ft)
- Highest elevation: 179 m (587 ft)
- Lowest elevation: 133 m (436 ft)
- Population (2023): 145
  - Density: 9.29/km^{2} (24.1/sq mi)
- Time zone: UTC+01:00 (CET)
  - Summer (DST): UTC+02:00 (CEST)
- Postal code: 36110
- ^{1} French Land Register data, which excludes lakes, ponds, glaciers > 1 km^{2} (0.386 sq mi or 247 acres) and river estuaries.

Saint-Martin-de-Lamps (French pronunciation: [sɛ̃ maʁtɛ̃ də lɑ̃]) is a former commune in the Indre department in central France. On 1 January 2016, it was merged into the commune of Levroux.

== See also ==
- Communes of the Indre department
