= Saint-Étienne-Lardeyrol =

- Commune
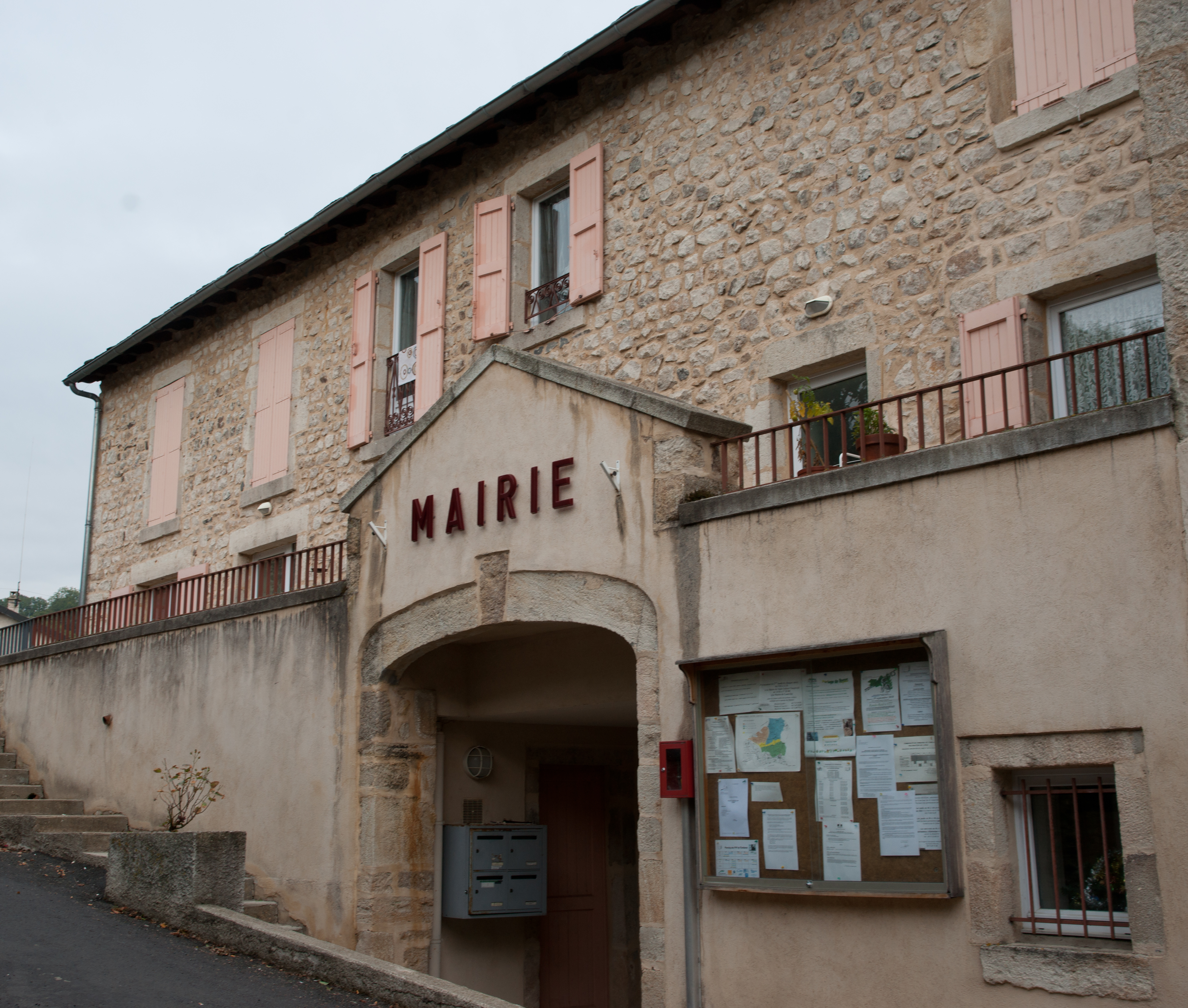
- Town hall
- Location of Saint-Étienne-Lardeyrol
- Location within France Location within Auvergne-Rhône-Alpes
- Coordinates: 45°04′20″N 4°00′07″E
- Country: France
- Region: Auvergne-Rhône-Alpes
- Department: Haute-Loire
- Arrondissement: Le Puy-en-Velay
- Canton: Emblavez-et-Meygal
- Intercommunality: CA du Puy-en-Velay

Government
  - Mayor (2020–2026): Marc Giraud
- Area^{1}: 11.8 km^{2} (4.6 sq mi)
- Elevation: 815 m (2,674 ft)
- Highest elevation: 1,033 m (3,389 ft)
- Lowest elevation: 669 m (2,195 ft)
- Population (2023): 771
  - Density: 65.3/km^{2} (169/sq mi)
- Time zone: UTC+01:00 (CET)
  - Summer (DST): UTC+02:00 (CEST)
- INSEE/Postal code: 43181 /43260
- ^{1} French Land Register data, which excludes lakes, ponds, glaciers > 1 km^{2} (0.386 sq mi or 247 acres) and river estuaries.

Saint-Étienne-Lardeyrol (French pronunciation: [sɛ̃.t‿etjɛn laʁdeʁɔl]; Auvergnat: Sant Estève) is a commune in the Haute-Loire department in south-central France.

== Population ==
Historical population
Year	Pop.	±% p.a.
1968	544	—
1975	506	−1.03%
1982	510	+0.11%
1990	561	+1.20%
1999	611	+0.95%
2007	656	+0.89%
2012	722	+1.94%
2017	759	+1.00%
2023	771	+0.26%
Source: INSEE

== See also ==
- Communes of the Haute-Loire department
