= Crêts en Belledonne =

- Commune
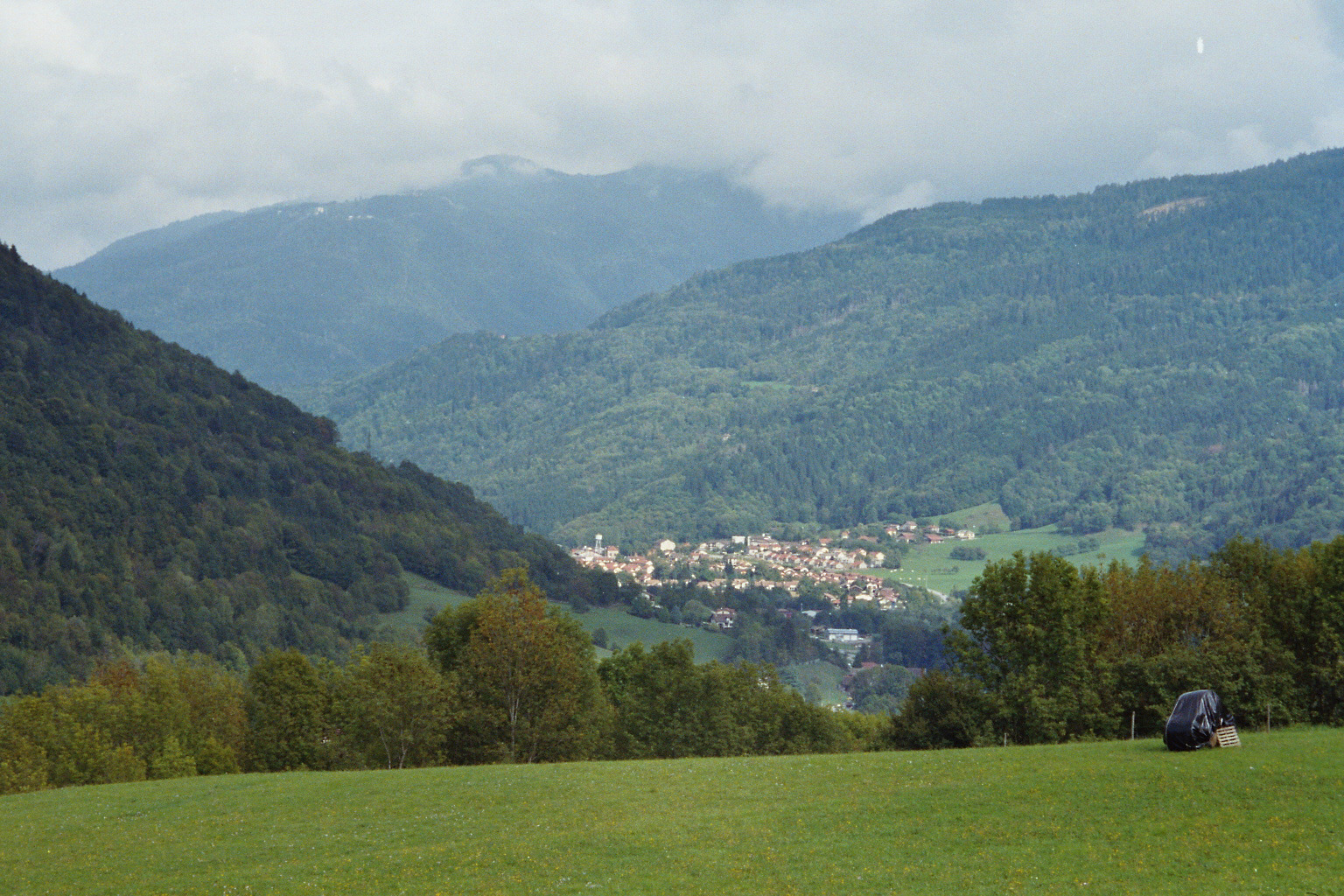
- A view of Saint-Pierre
- Location of Crêts en Belledonne
- Location within France Location within Auvergne-Rhône-Alpes
- Coordinates: 45°22′26″N 6°02′46″E
- Country: France
- Region: Auvergne-Rhône-Alpes
- Department: Isère
- Arrondissement: Grenoble
- Canton: Le Haut-Grésivaudan
- Intercommunality: CC Le Grésivaudan

Government
  - Mayor (2020–2026): Youcef Tabet
- Area^{1}: 33.80 km^{2} (13.05 sq mi)
- Population (2023): 3,470
  - Density: 103/km^{2} (266/sq mi)
- Time zone: UTC+01:00 (CET)
  - Summer (DST): UTC+02:00 (CEST)
- INSEE/Postal code: 38439 /38830, 38570
- ^{1} French Land Register data, which excludes lakes, ponds, glaciers > 1 km^{2} (0.386 sq mi or 247 acres) and river estuaries.

Crêts en Belledonne (French pronunciation: [kʁɛ ɑ̃ bɛldɔn], literally Crests in Belledonne) is a commune in the Isère department of southeastern France. The municipality was established on 1 January 2016 and consists of the former communes of Saint-Pierre-d'Allevard and Morêtel-de-Mailles.

== Population ==
Population data refer to the commune in its geography as of January 2025.

Historical population
Year	Pop.	±% p.a.
1968	2,303	—
1975	2,273	−0.19%
1982	2,205	−0.43%
1990	2,445	+1.30%
1999	2,586	+0.62%
2007	3,069	+2.16%
2012	3,283	+1.36%
2017	3,339	+0.34%
2023	3,470	+0.64%
Source: INSEE

== See also ==
- Communes of the Isère department
