= Vorey =

- Commune
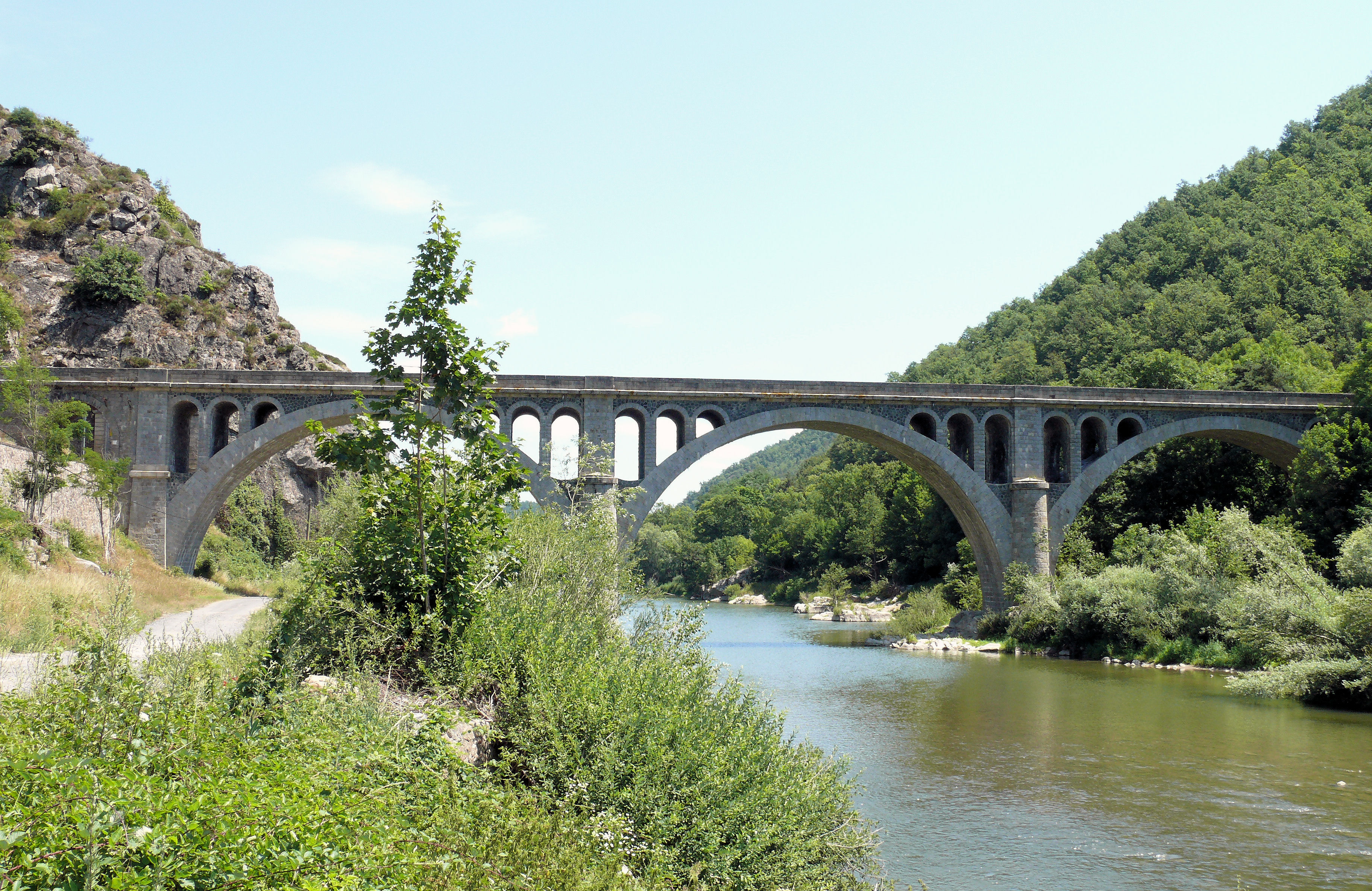
- Bridge over the Loire
- Location of Vorey
- Location within France Location within Auvergne-Rhône-Alpes
- Coordinates: 45°11′14″N 3°54′38″E
- Country: France
- Region: Auvergne-Rhône-Alpes
- Department: Haute-Loire
- Arrondissement: Le Puy-en-Velay
- Canton: Emblavez-et-Meygal
- Intercommunality: CA du Puy-en-Velay

Government
  - Mayor (2020–2026): Cécile Gallien
- Area^{1}: 39.23 km^{2} (15.15 sq mi)
- Elevation: 548 m (1,798 ft)
- Highest elevation: 948 m (3,110 ft)
- Lowest elevation: 510 m (1,670 ft)
- Population (2023): 1,488
  - Density: 37.93/km^{2} (98.24/sq mi)
- Time zone: UTC+01:00 (CET)
  - Summer (DST): UTC+02:00 (CEST)
- INSEE/Postal code: 43267 /43800
- ^{1} French Land Register data, which excludes lakes, ponds, glaciers > 1 km^{2} (0.386 sq mi or 247 acres) and river estuaries.

Vorey (French pronunciation: [vɔʁɛ], also: Vorey-sur-Arzon; Occitan: Vorèi) is a commune in the Haute-Loire department in south-central France.

== Population ==
Historical population
Year	Pop.	±% p.a.
1968	1,153	—
1975	1,240	+1.04%
1982	1,276	+0.41%
1990	1,315	+0.38%
1999	1,451	+1.10%
2007	1,435	−0.14%
2012	1,434	−0.01%
2017	1,447	+0.18%
2023	1,488	+0.47%
Source: INSEE

== Personalities ==
- Clémentine Solignac

== See also ==
- Communes of the Haute-Loire department
