= Levroux =

- Commune
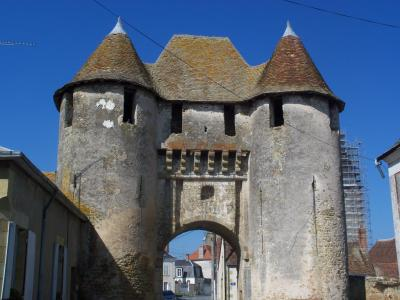
- The medieval Porte de Champagne gate

- Coat of arms
- Location of Levroux
- Location within France Location within Centre-Val de Loire
- Coordinates: 46°58′41″N 1°36′49″E
- Country: France
- Region: Centre-Val de Loire
- Department: Indre
- Arrondissement: Châteauroux
- Canton: Levroux
- Intercommunality: CC Levroux Boischaut Champagne

Government
  - Mayor (2020–2026): Alexis Rousseau-Jouhennet
- Area^{1}: 82.32 km^{2} (31.78 sq mi)
- Elevation: 141 m (463 ft)
- Highest elevation: 190 m (620 ft)
- Lowest elevation: 125 m (410 ft)
- Population (2023): 2,797
  - Density: 33.98/km^{2} (88.00/sq mi)
- Time zone: UTC+01:00 (CET)
  - Summer (DST): UTC+02:00 (CEST)
- INSEE/Postal code: 36093 /36110
- ^{1} French Land Register data, which excludes lakes, ponds, glaciers > 1 km^{2} (0.386 sq mi or 247 acres) and river estuaries.

Levroux (French pronunciation: [ləvʁu]) is a commune in the Indre department in central France, to the north of Châteauroux. On 1 January 2016, the former commune of Saint-Martin-de-Lamps was merged into Levroux. On 1 January 2019, the former commune Saint-Pierre-de-Lamps was merged into Levroux. Its Porte de Champagne fortified gateway is the only survivor of its seven gates. Levroux is famous for its local delicacy of goats' cheese.

== Population ==
Historical population
Year	Pop.	±% p.a.
1968	3,507	—
1975	3,439	−0.28%
1982	3,387	−0.22%
1990	3,278	−0.41%
1999	3,104	−0.60%
2007	3,028	−0.31%
2012	3,047	+0.13%
2017	2,947	−0.67%
2023	2,797	−0.87%
Populations of the area corresponding with the commune of Levroux at 1 January 2025. Source: INSEE

== See also ==
- Communes of the Indre department
