= Saint-Vincent, Haute-Loire =

Saint-Vincent
- Commune
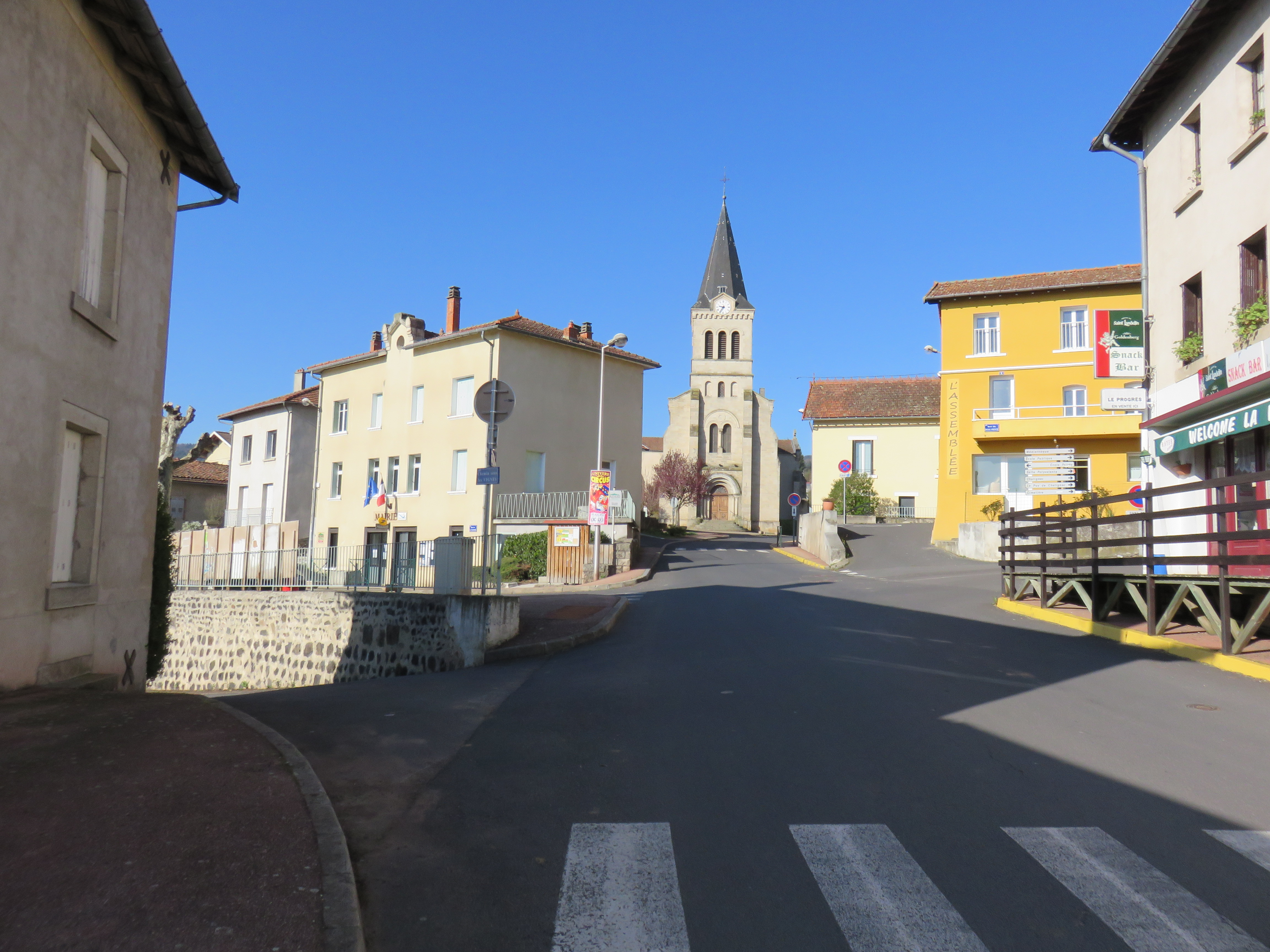
- Location of Saint-Vincent
- Location within France Location within Auvergne-Rhône-Alpes
- Coordinates: 45°08′42″N 3°54′37″E
- Country: France
- Region: Auvergne-Rhône-Alpes
- Department: Haute-Loire
- Arrondissement: Le Puy-en-Velay
- Canton: Emblavez-et-Meygal
- Intercommunality: CA du Puy-en-Velay

Government
  - Mayor (2020–2026): Jean-Benoît Girodet
- Area^{1}: 20.4 km^{2} (7.9 sq mi)
- Elevation: 552 m (1,811 ft)
- Highest elevation: 932 m (3,058 ft)
- Lowest elevation: 528 m (1,732 ft)
- Population (2023): 1,089
  - Density: 53.4/km^{2} (138/sq mi)
- Time zone: UTC+01:00 (CET)
  - Summer (DST): UTC+02:00 (CEST)
- INSEE/Postal code: 43230 /43800
- ^{1} French Land Register data, which excludes lakes, ponds, glaciers > 1 km^{2} (0.386 sq mi or 247 acres) and river estuaries.

Saint-Vincent (French pronunciation: [sɛ̃ vɛ̃sɑ̃]; Auvergnat: Sent Vincenç) is a commune in the Haute-Loire department in south-central France.

== Population ==
Historical population
Year	Pop.	±% p.a.
1968	709	—
1975	731	+0.44%
1982	775	+0.84%
1990	806	+0.49%
1999	831	+0.34%
2007	949	+1.67%
2012	977	+0.58%
2017	1,012	+0.71%
2023	1,089	+1.23%
Source: INSEE

== See also ==
- Communes of the Haute-Loire department
