= Mézères =

- Commune
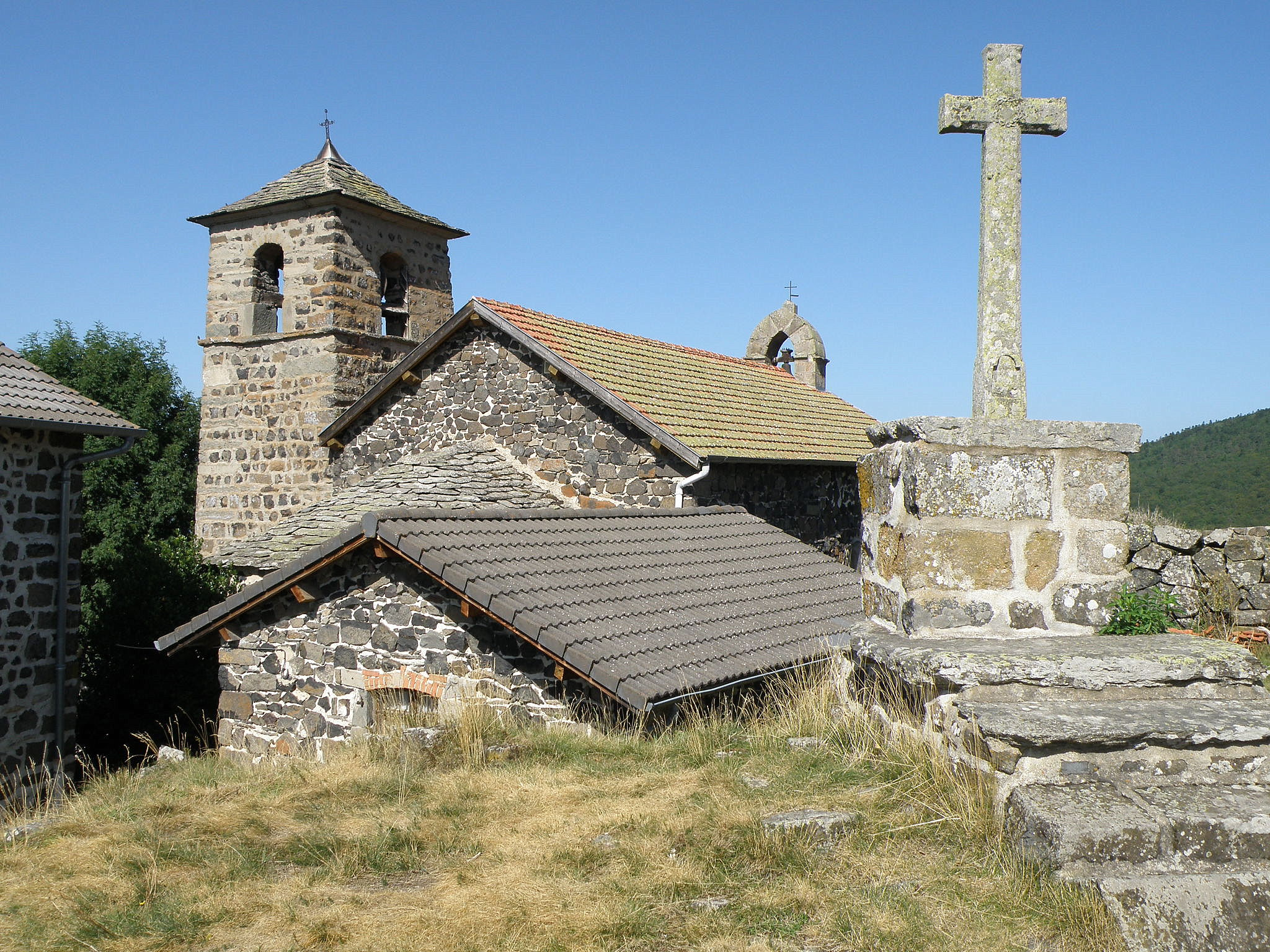
- Location of Mézères
- Location within France Location within Auvergne-Rhône-Alpes
- Coordinates: 45°09′39″N 4°01′12″E
- Country: France
- Region: Auvergne-Rhône-Alpes
- Department: Haute-Loire
- Arrondissement: Le Puy-en-Velay
- Canton: Emblavez-et-Meygal
- Intercommunality: CA du Puy-en-Velay

Government
  - Mayor (2020–2026): Gilles Tempére
- Area^{1}: 8.58 km^{2} (3.31 sq mi)
- Elevation: 950 m (3,120 ft)
- Highest elevation: 1,089 m (3,573 ft)
- Lowest elevation: 805 m (2,641 ft)
- Population (2023): 178
  - Density: 20.7/km^{2} (53.7/sq mi)
- Time zone: UTC+01:00 (CET)
  - Summer (DST): UTC+02:00 (CEST)
- INSEE/Postal code: 43134 /43800
- ^{1} French Land Register data, which excludes lakes, ponds, glaciers > 1 km^{2} (0.386 sq mi or 247 acres) and river estuaries.

Mézères (French pronunciation: [mezɛʁ]) is a commune in the Haute-Loire department in south-central France.

== Population ==
Historical population
Year	Pop.	±% p.a.
1968	164	—
1975	124	−3.92%
1982	105	−2.35%
1990	101	−0.48%
1999	102	+0.11%
2007	158	+5.62%
2012	159	+0.13%
2017	158	−0.13%
2023	178	+2.01%
Source: INSEE

== See also ==
- Communes of the Haute-Loire department
