= Canton of Emblavez-et-Meygal =

Coordinates: 45.03°N 4.06°E

The canton of Emblavez-et-Meygal is an administrative division of the Haute-Loire department, south-central France. It was created at the French canton reorganisation which came into effect in March 2015. Its seat is in Saint-Julien-Chapteuil.

It consists of the following communes:

1. Beaulieu
2. Chamalières-sur-Loire
3. Lavoûte-sur-Loire
4. Malrevers
5. Mézères
6. Le Pertuis
7. Queyrières
8. Rosières
9. Saint-Étienne-Lardeyrol
10. Saint-Hostien
11. Saint-Julien-Chapteuil
12. Saint-Pierre-Eynac
13. Saint-Vincent
14. Vorey
