= Beaulieu, Haute-Loire =

Beaulieu
- Commune
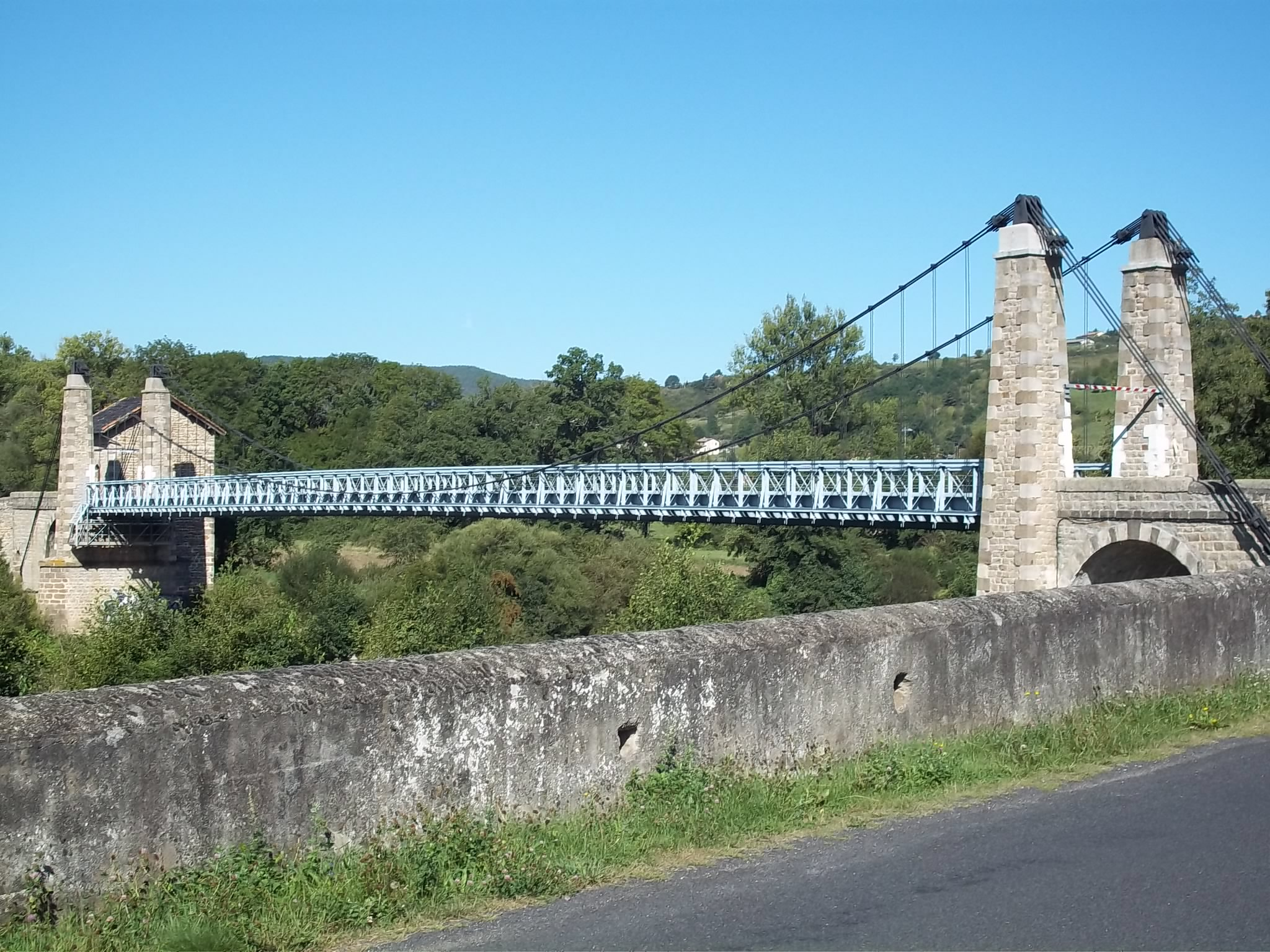
- Suspension bridge of Margaix
- Location of Beaulieu
- Location within France Location within Auvergne-Rhône-Alpes
- Coordinates: 45°07′44″N 3°56′34″E
- Country: France
- Region: Auvergne-Rhône-Alpes
- Department: Haute-Loire
- Arrondissement: Le Puy-en-Velay
- Canton: Emblavez-et-Meygal
- Intercommunality: CA du Puy-en-Velay

Government
  - Mayor (2020–2026): Yves Colomb
- Area^{1}: 22.27 km^{2} (8.60 sq mi)
- Elevation: 600 m (2,000 ft)
- Highest elevation: 948 m (3,110 ft)
- Lowest elevation: 543 m (1,781 ft)
- Population (2023): 1,096
  - Density: 49.21/km^{2} (127.5/sq mi)
- Time zone: UTC+01:00 (CET)
  - Summer (DST): UTC+02:00 (CEST)
- INSEE/Postal code: 43021 /43800
- ^{1} French Land Register data, which excludes lakes, ponds, glaciers > 1 km^{2} (0.386 sq mi or 247 acres) and river estuaries.

Beaulieu (French pronunciation: [boljø]) is a commune in the Haute-Loire department and Auvergne-Rhône-Alpes region of south-east central France.

== Population ==
Historical population
Year	Pop.	±% p.a.
1968	570	—
1975	663	+2.18%
1982	739	+1.56%
1990	836	+1.55%
1999	845	+0.12%
2007	904	+0.85%
2012	973	+1.48%
2017	1,029	+1.13%
2023	1,096	+1.06%
Source: INSEE

== See also ==
- Communes of the Haute-Loire department
