= Saint-Pierre-du-Mont Airfield =

Abandoned World War II military airfield located in the Calvados department

Saint-Pierre-du-Mont Airfield Advanced Landing Ground (ALG) A-1
- Emergency Landing Strip (ELS) A-1; Refuelling and Rearming Strip (RRS) A-1
- Calvados, Basse-Normandie Region, France
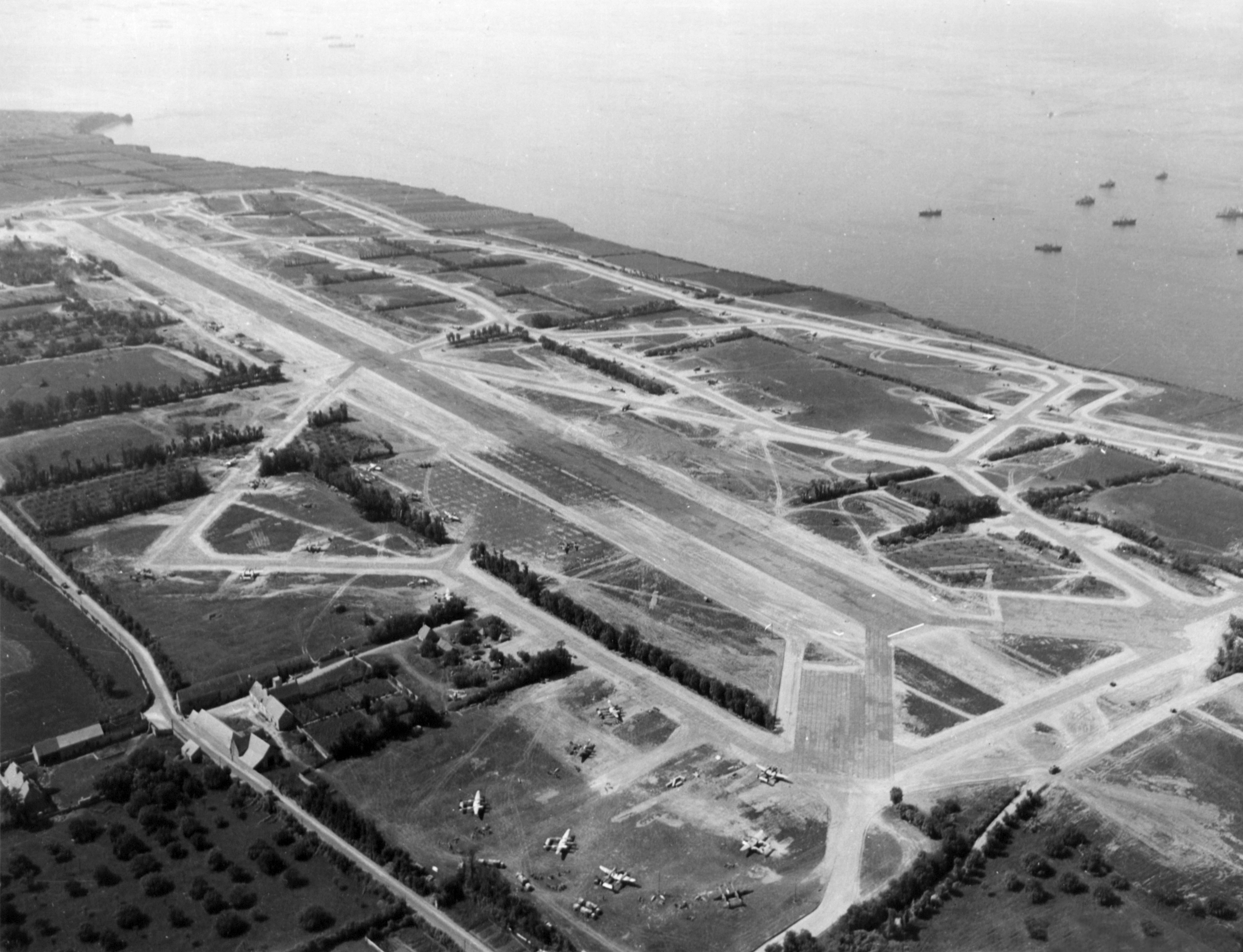
- Saint-Pierre-du-Mont Airfield ALG A-1 France, July/August 1944

Site information
- Type: Military Airfield
- Controlled by: United States Army Air Forces

Location
- Coordinates: 49°23′28″N 000°56′50″W

Site history
- Built by: IX Engineering Command
- In use: June–September 1944
- Materials: Square-Mesh Track (SMT)
- Battles/wars: World War II - EAME Theater: Normandy Campaign; Northern France Campaign

Garrison information
- Garrison: Ninth Air Force
- Occupants: 366th Fighter Group

Airfield information
Runways
Direction	Length and surface
10/28	5,000 feet (1,520 m) SMT/PSP
- One runway, 4 alert pads, 50 hardstands

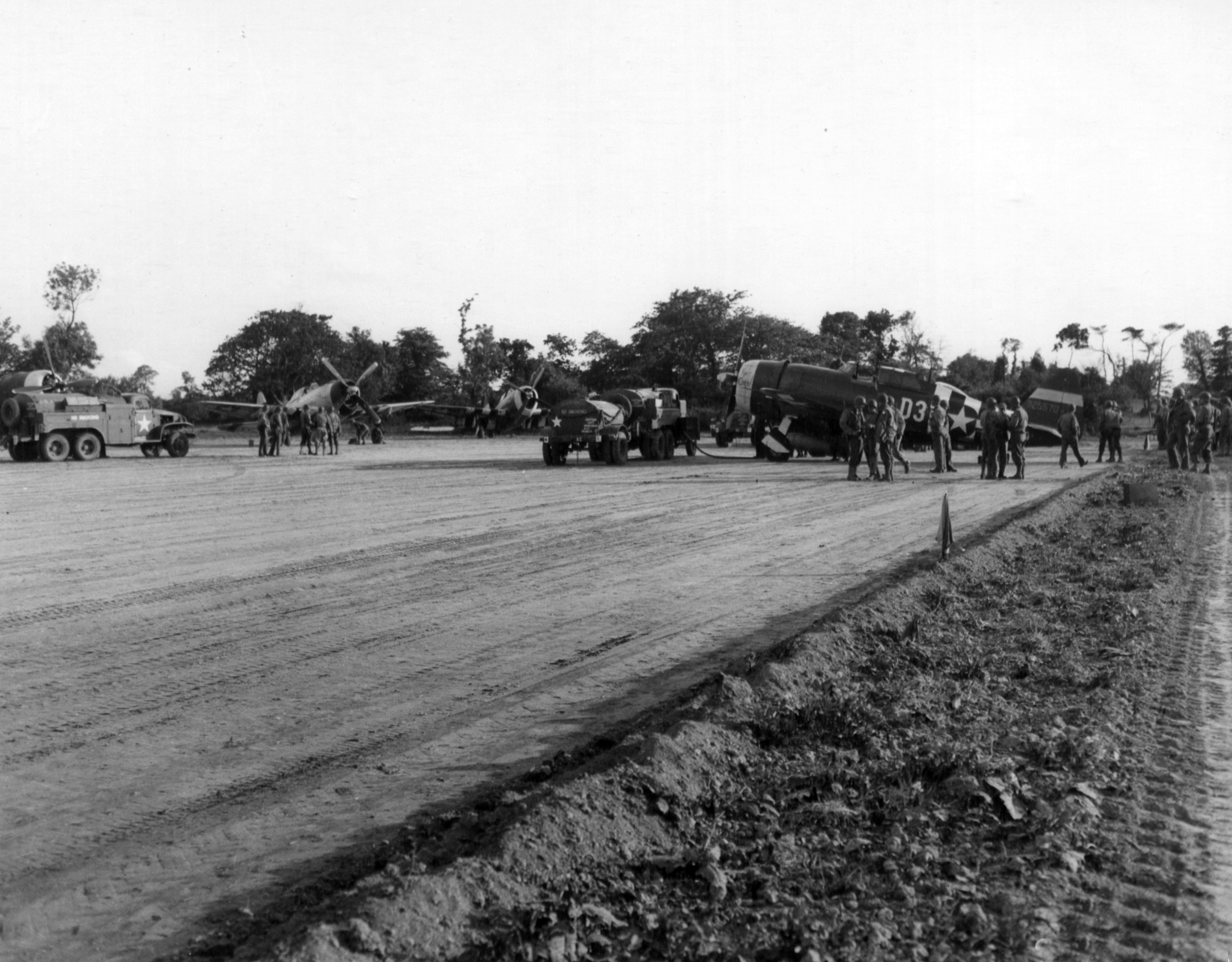
P-47 Thunderbolts of the 366th Fighter Group at Saint-Pierre-du-Mont Airfield (A-1), France, Summer 1944

Saint-Pierre-du-Mont Airfield is an abandoned World War II military airfield which is located in the Calvados department in the Normandy region in northern France. It was one of the many instrumental airfields used to defeat Adolf Hitler's Axis powers in World War II.

Located just north of Saint-Pierre-du-Mont along the English Channel coast, it was a United States Army Air Force temporary airfield established shortly after the D-Day landings in France. The airfield was one of the first established in the liberated area of Normandy, being constructed by the IX Engineering Command, 834th Engineer Aviation Battalion.

== History ==
Known as Advanced Landing Ground "A-1", the airfield consisted of a single 5,000 ft (1,500 m) Square-Mesh Track runway. Tents were used for billeting and for support facilities; an access road was built to the existing road infrastructure; a dump for supplies, ammunition, and gasoline drums, along with a drinkable water and minimal electrical grid for communications and station lighting.

Construction of the airfield began on 7 June, the day after the initial invasion, and was completed on 8 June at 1800 hrs The airfield was completed only 2 days after the D-Day landings in France. It was pressed into service as Emergency Landing Strip 1 (ELS A-1) with a 1,000 m × 35 m (3,281 ft × 115 ft)untracked (grass/dirt) runway. It served only small observation aircraft at that time. Just over 24 hours later (18:45) it had been upgraded from a Refuelling and Rearming Strip (RRS A-1) to an Advanced Landing Ground (ALG A-1), able to handle aircraft up to the C-47 transport. From 10 June 1944 an RAF Ames Type 15 GCI radar site became active at the airfield, the only survivor of three that were accidentally sent to the Normandy beaches on D-Day, instead of D-Day+3 of the invasion.

After his day trip to Normandy on June 12, General "Hap" Arnold, USAAF commander, returned to the UK from A-1.

Combat units stationed at the airfield were the 366th Fighter Group, which based P-47 Thunderbolt fighters at the field from 13 June through 5 September 1944.

The 401st Fighter Squadron (9D), [370th Fighter Group] based P-38 Lighting fighters [note bottom center of accompanying airfield photograph] from July - August 1944.

It also housed the 2d Platoon of the 1st Air Force Clearing Station, which had landed at Omaha Beach on 16 June. The medical unit set up a field hospital just off base, which by that time would still occasionally receive incoming enemy fire, as the front line was not far away. The platoon consisted of 4 Medical Officers, 1 Dental Officer, 1 Medical Administrative Officer, 6 (female) Nurses, and 57 Enlisted Men.

The fighter aircraft flew support missions during the Allied invasion of Normandy, patrolling roads in front of the beachhead; strafing German military vehicles and dropping bombs on gun emplacements, anti-aircraft artillery and concentrations of German troops when spotted. In addition to the fighters, elements of the 416th and 322d Bomb Groups dispatched Martin B-26 Marauder medium bombers from their bases in England to Saint-Pierre-du-Mont to attack German strong points in Normandy during the initial battles around Saint-Lô

After the Americans moved east into Central France with the advancing Allied Armies, the airfield was left un-garrisoned and used for resupply and casualty evacuation. It was closed on 5 September 1944.

== Major units assigned ==
- 366th Fighter Group 17 June-24 August 1944

389th (A6), 390th (B2), 391st (A8) Fighter Squadrons (P-47D)

- 401st Fighter Squadron [9D], of the 370th Fighter Group [P-38] July - August 1944

== Current use ==
After its closure by the Americans, the airfield was dismantled in September 1944 and the land returned to agricultural use. Today there is little or no physical evidence of its existence or its location. There is a monument to the A-1 Airfield north of the D514, just to the north of Les Bergeries.

== See also ==
- Advanced Landing Ground
