= De Saint-Pierre =

de Saint-Pierre is a French surname. Notable people with the surname include:

- Charles-Irénée Castel de Saint-Pierre (1658–1743), influential French writer and radical
- Jacques Legardeur de Saint-Pierre (1701–1755), French military leader
- Jacques-Henri Bernardin de Saint-Pierre (1737–1814), French writer and botanist
