= Saint-Pierre (surname) =

Saint-Pierre, St Pierre or St. Pierre is a surname. Notable people with the surname include:

- Charles-Irénée Castel de Saint-Pierre (1658–1743), proposed the creation of a European league of 18 sovereign states
- Georges St-Pierre (born 1981), Canadian MMA fighter
- Guy Saint-Pierre (1934–2022), Canadian politician and businessman
- Jacques-Henri Bernardin de Saint-Pierre (1737–1814), French writer and botanist
- Liliane Saint-Pierre (born 1948), Belgian singer
- Marie-Josée Saint-Pierre (born 1978), Canadian filmmaker
- Allen St. Pierre, executive director of the National Organization for the Reform of Marijuana Laws
- Annie St-Pierre, Canadian film director and producer
- Brian St. Pierre (born 1979), American football quarterback
- Christine St-Pierre (born 1953), journalist and Quebec politician
- Éric St-Pierre, Canadian politician
- Jonathan St-Pierre (born 1983), Canadian professional football player
- Kim St-Pierre (born 1978), Canadian ice hockey player
- Martin St. Pierre (racewalker) (born 1972), Canadian racewalker
- Martin St. Pierre (ice hockey) (born 1983), Canadian ice hockey player
- Monique St. Pierre (born 1953), German-American Playboy model and actress
