= Saint-Pierre-d'Allevard =

- Part of Crêts-en-Belledonne
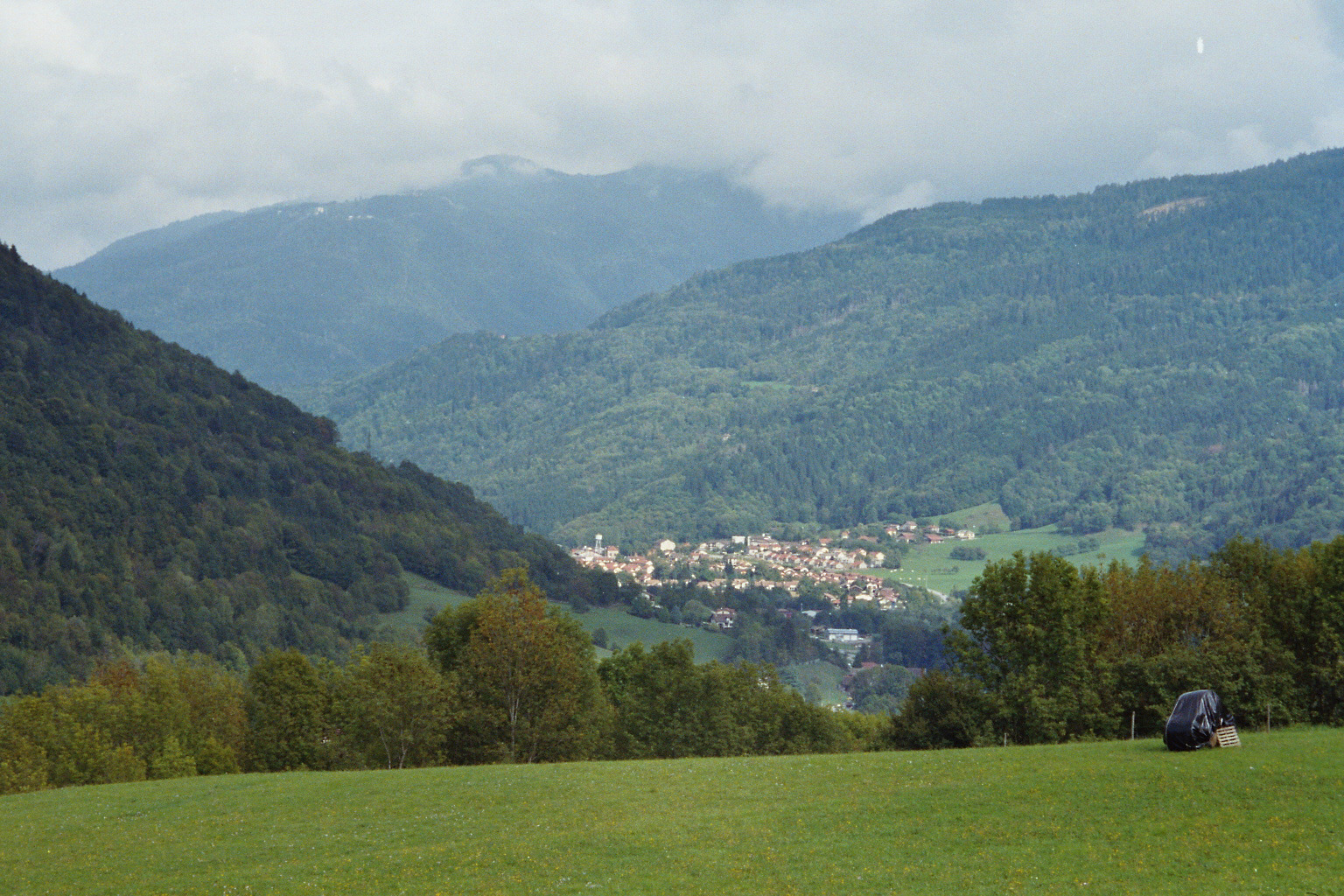
- Location of Saint-Pierre-d'Allevard
- Location within France Location within Auvergne-Rhône-Alpes
- Coordinates: 45°22′32″N 6°02′55″E
- Country: France
- Region: Auvergne-Rhône-Alpes
- Department: Isère
- Arrondissement: Grenoble
- Canton: Allevard
- Commune: Crêts-en-Belledonne
- Area^{1}: 27 km^{2} (10 sq mi)
- Elevation: 943 m (3,094 ft)
- Highest elevation: 1,766 m (5,794 ft)
- Lowest elevation: 429 m (1,407 ft)
- Population (2013): 2,887
  - Density: 110/km^{2} (280/sq mi)
- Time zone: UTC+01:00 (CET)
  - Summer (DST): UTC+02:00 (CEST)
- Postal code: 38830
- ^{1} French Land Register data, which excludes lakes, ponds, glaciers > 1 km^{2} (0.386 sq mi or 247 acres) and river estuaries.

Saint-Pierre-d'Allevard (French pronunciation: [sɛ̃ pjɛʁ dalvaʁ], literally Saint-Pierre of Allevard) is a former commune in the Isère department in southeastern France. On 1 January 2016, it was merged into the new commune of Crêts-en-Belledonne.

== Population ==
Historical population

Year	Pop.	±% p.a.
1793	1,587	—
1821	1,926	+0.69%
1846	2,010	+0.17%
1872	1,975	−0.07%
1901	1,690	−0.54%
1926	1,572	−0.29%
1946	1,506	−0.21%

Year	Pop.	±% p.a.
1962	1,784	+1.06%
1968	2,152	+3.18%
1975	2,147	−0.03%
1982	2,016	−0.90%
1990	2,185	+1.01%
1999	2,282	+0.48%
2013	2,887	+1.69%

Source: EHESS and INSEE

== See also ==
- Communes of the Isère department
