= Saint-Pierre-du-Val =

- Commune
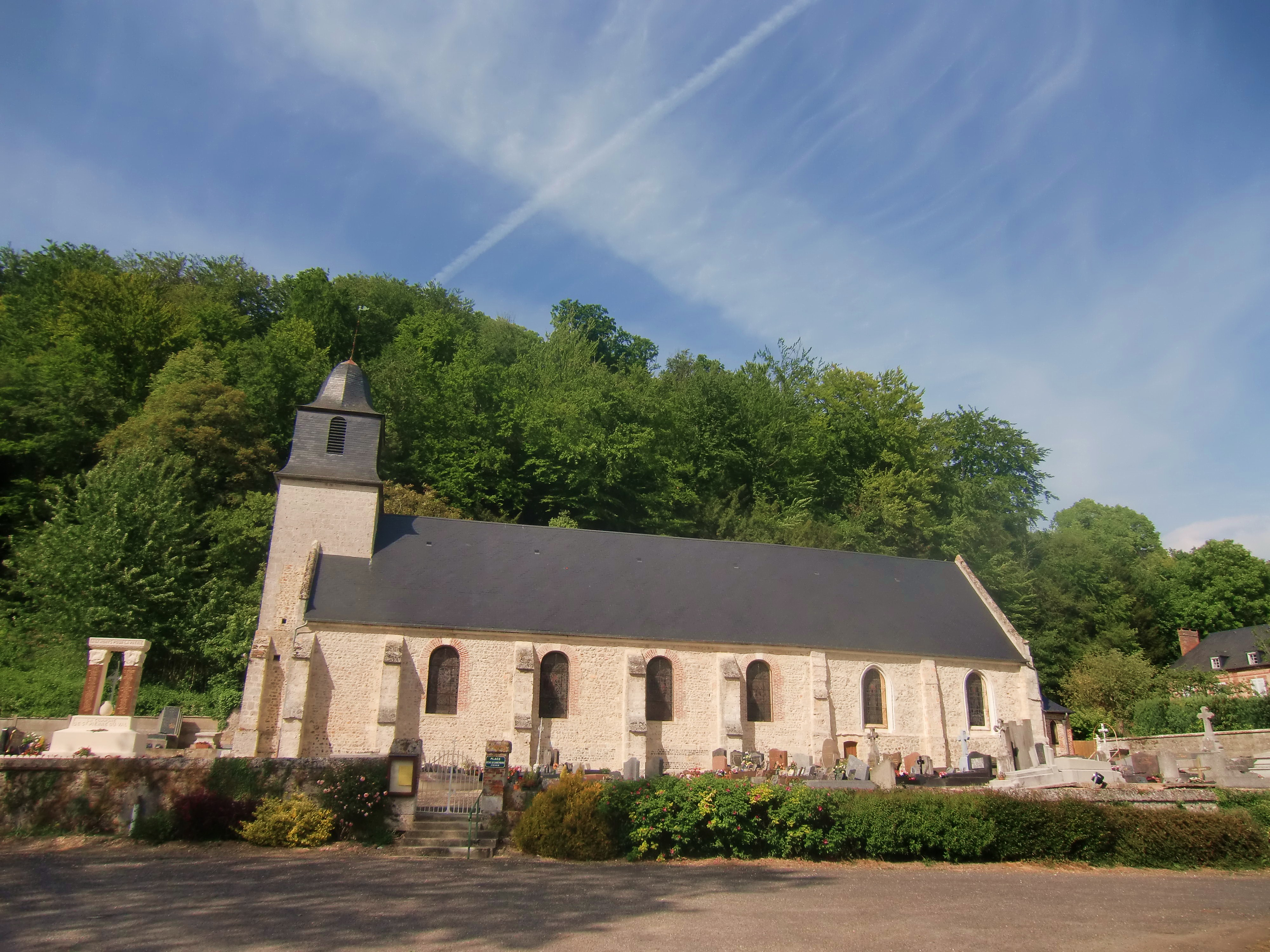
- The church in Saint-Pierre-du-Val

- Coat of arms
- Location of Saint-Pierre-du-Val
- Location within France Location within Normandy
- Coordinates: 49°23′55″N 0°21′42″E
- Country: France
- Region: Normandy
- Department: Eure
- Arrondissement: Bernay
- Canton: Beuzeville

Government
  - Mayor (2020–2026): Martine Houssaye
- Area^{1}: 12.23 km^{2} (4.72 sq mi)
- Elevation: 45 m (148 ft)
- Highest elevation: 118 m (387 ft)
- Lowest elevation: 18 m (59 ft)
- Population (2023): 600
  - Density: 49/km^{2} (130/sq mi)
- Time zone: UTC+01:00 (CET)
  - Summer (DST): UTC+02:00 (CEST)
- INSEE/Postal code: 27597 /27210
- ^{1} French Land Register data, which excludes lakes, ponds, glaciers > 1 km^{2} (0.386 sq mi or 247 acres) and river estuaries.

Saint-Pierre-du-Val is a commune in the Eure department in Normandy in northern France.

== Population ==
Historical population
Year	Pop.	±% p.a.
1968	359	—
1975	320	−1.63%
1982	337	+0.74%
1990	349	+0.44%
1999	456	+3.02%
2007	517	+1.58%
2012	562	+1.68%
2017	572	+0.35%
2023	600	+0.80%
Source: INSEE

== See also ==
- Communes of the Eure department
