= La Rue-Saint-Pierre =

La Rue-Saint-Pierre may refer to the following places in France:

- La Rue-Saint-Pierre, Oise, a commune in the Oise department
- La Rue-Saint-Pierre, Seine-Maritime, a commune in the Seine-Maritime department
