= Saint-Pierre-Eynac =

- Commune
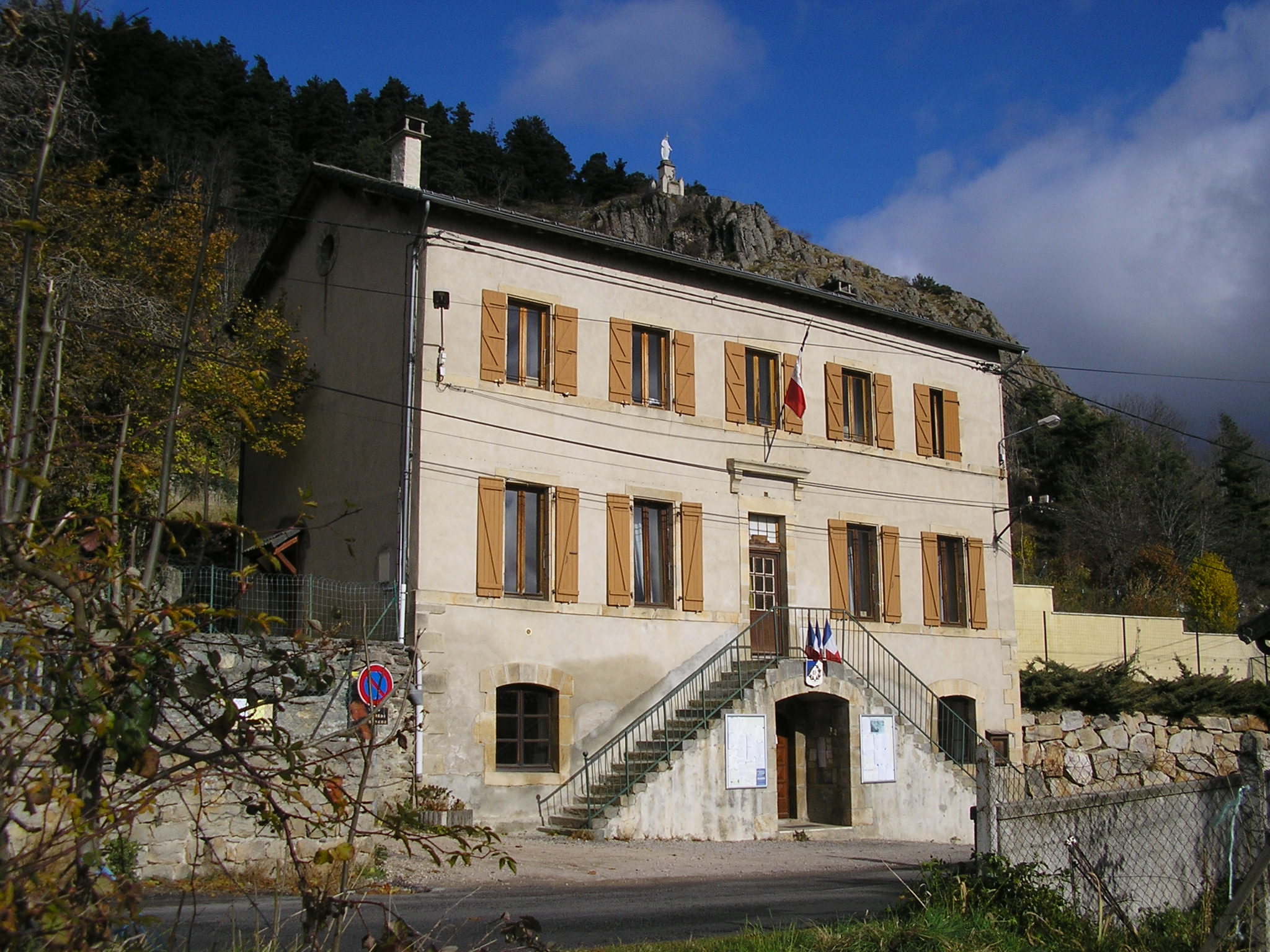
- Town hall
- Location of Saint-Pierre-Eynac
- Location within France Location within Auvergne-Rhône-Alpes
- Coordinates: 45°02′51″N 4°02′05″E
- Country: France
- Region: Auvergne-Rhône-Alpes
- Department: Haute-Loire
- Arrondissement: Le Puy-en-Velay
- Canton: Emblavez-et-Meygal

Government
  - Mayor (2020–2026): Raymond Abrial
- Area^{1}: 23.99 km^{2} (9.26 sq mi)
- Elevation: 865 m (2,838 ft)
- Highest elevation: 1,070 m (3,510 ft)
- Lowest elevation: 685 m (2,247 ft)
- Population (2023): 1,288
  - Density: 53.69/km^{2} (139.1/sq mi)
- Time zone: UTC+01:00 (CET)
  - Summer (DST): UTC+02:00 (CEST)
- INSEE/Postal code: 43218 /43260
- ^{1} French Land Register data, which excludes lakes, ponds, glaciers > 1 km^{2} (0.386 sq mi or 247 acres) and river estuaries.

Saint-Pierre-Eynac (French pronunciation: [sɛ̃ pjɛʁ ɛnak]; Auvergnat: Sant Pèire-Aenac) is a commune in the Haute-Loire department in south-central France.

== Population ==
Historical population
Year	Pop.	±% p.a.
1968	636	—
1975	618	−0.41%
1982	664	+1.03%
1990	775	+1.95%
1999	847	+0.99%
2007	985	+1.90%
2012	1,065	+1.57%
2017	1,147	+1.49%
2023	1,288	+1.95%
Source: INSEE

== See also ==
- Communes of the Haute-Loire department
