= Saint-Pierre-de-Lamps =

- Part of Levroux
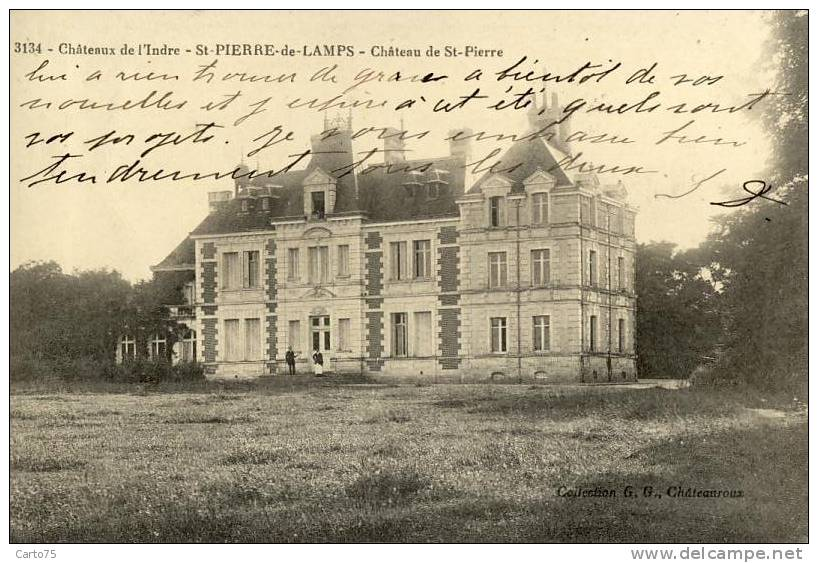
- An old postcard view of the château
- Location of Saint-Pierre-de-Lamps
- Location within France Location within Centre-Val de Loire
- Coordinates: 46°58′19″N 1°30′48″E
- Country: France
- Region: Centre-Val de Loire
- Department: Indre
- Arrondissement: Châteauroux
- Canton: Levroux
- Commune: Levroux
- Area^{1}: 10.28 km^{2} (3.97 sq mi)
- Elevation: 140 m (460 ft)
- Highest elevation: 185 m (607 ft)
- Lowest elevation: 138 m (453 ft)
- Population (2018): 54
  - Density: 5.3/km^{2} (14/sq mi)
- Time zone: UTC+01:00 (CET)
  - Summer (DST): UTC+02:00 (CEST)
- Postal code: 36110
- ^{1} French Land Register data, which excludes lakes, ponds, glaciers > 1 km^{2} (0.386 sq mi or 247 acres) and river estuaries.

Saint-Pierre-de-Lamps (French pronunciation: [sɛ̃ pjɛʁ də lɑ̃]) is a former commune in the Indre department in central France. On 1 January 2019, it was merged into the commune Levroux.

== See also ==
- Communes of the Indre department

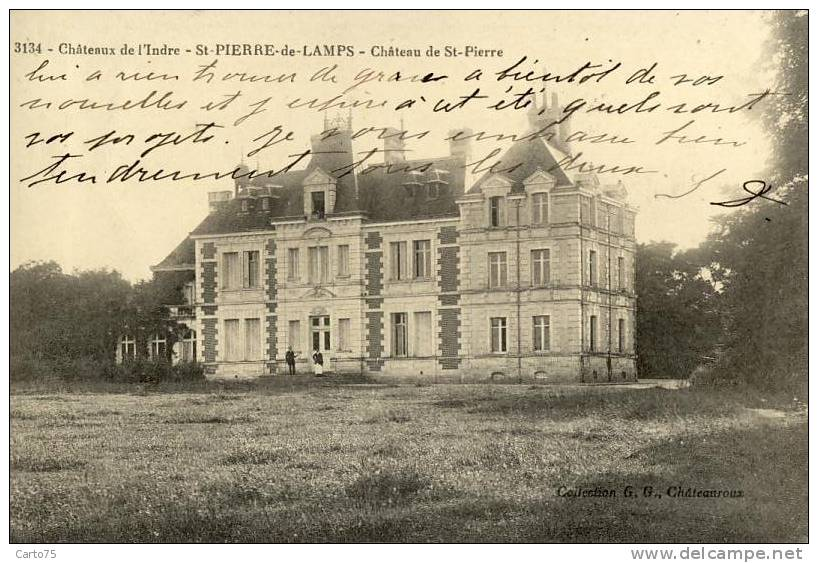
Ancienne carte postale du château de Saint-Pierre de Lamps dans l'Indre
