= Saint-Pierre, Jura =

Commune in Bourgogne-Franche-Comté, France

Saint-Pierre
- Commune
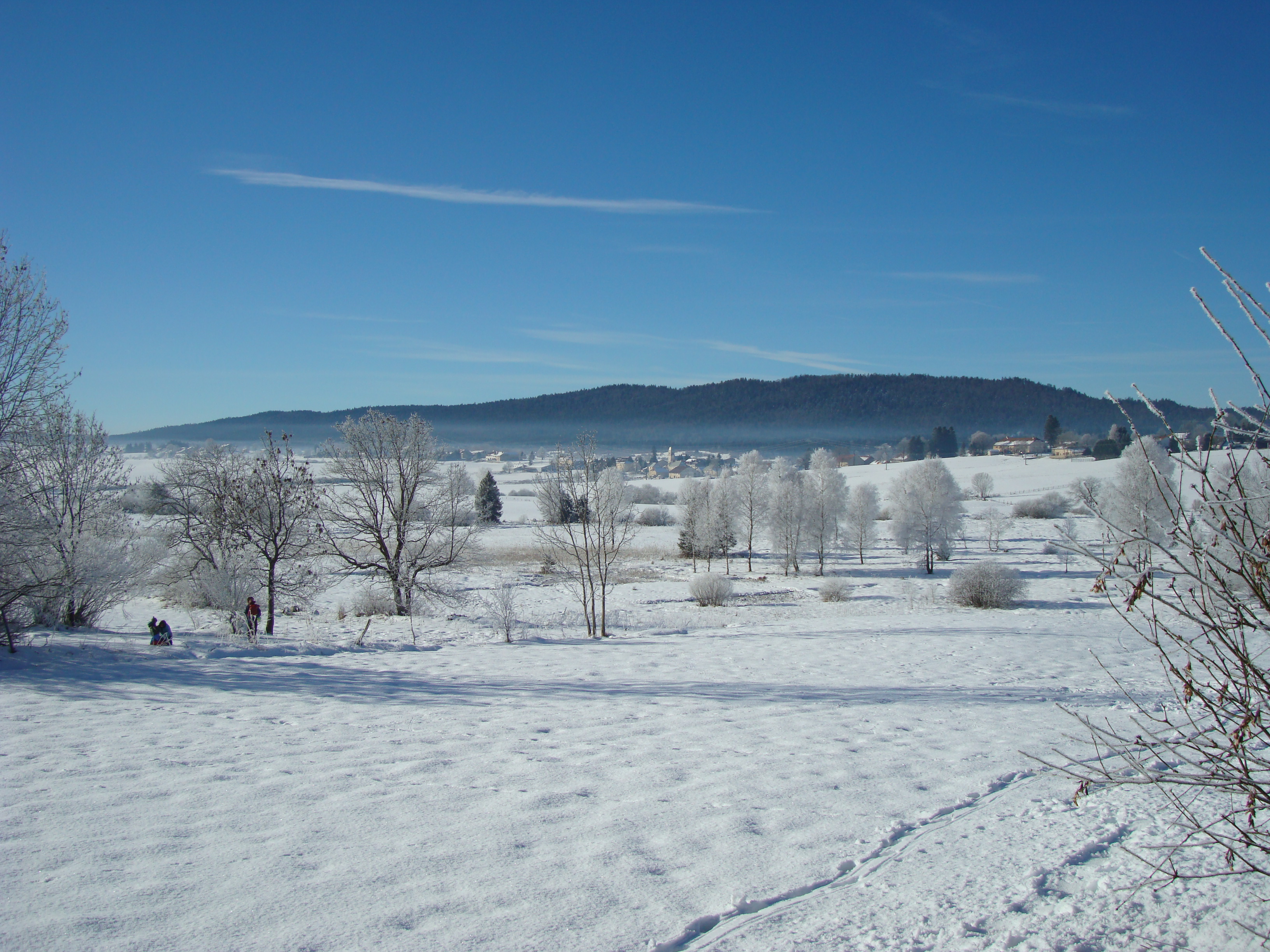
- A general view of Saint-Pierre in winter
- Location of Saint-Pierre
- Location within France Location within Bourgogne-Franche-Comté
- Coordinates: 46°34′12″N 5°55′13″E
- Country: France
- Region: Bourgogne-Franche-Comté
- Department: Jura
- Arrondissement: Saint-Claude
- Canton: Saint-Laurent-en-Grandvaux

Government
  - Mayor (2020–2026): Liliane Faivre
- Area^{1}: 16.37 km^{2} (6.32 sq mi)
- Highest elevation: 1,135 m (3,724 ft)
- Lowest elevation: 846 m (2,776 ft)
- Population (2023): 383
  - Density: 23.4/km^{2} (60.6/sq mi)
- Time zone: UTC+01:00 (CET)
  - Summer (DST): UTC+02:00 (CEST)
- INSEE/Postal code: 39494 /39150
- ^{1} French Land Register data, which excludes lakes, ponds, glaciers > 1 km^{2} (0.386 sq mi or 247 acres) and river estuaries.

Saint-Pierre (French pronunciation: [sɛ̃ pjɛʁ]) is a commune in the Jura department in the Bourgogne-Franche-Comté region in eastern France.

== Population ==
Historical population
Year	Pop.	±% p.a.
1968	163	—
1975	185	+1.83%
1982	204	+1.41%
1990	239	+2.00%
1999	316	+3.15%
2007	319	+0.12%
2012	318	−0.06%
2017	342	+1.47%
2023	383	+1.90%
Source: INSEE

== See also ==
- Communes of the Jura department
