= Saint-Pierre-du-Mont, Calvados =

Saint-Pierre-du-Mont
- Commune
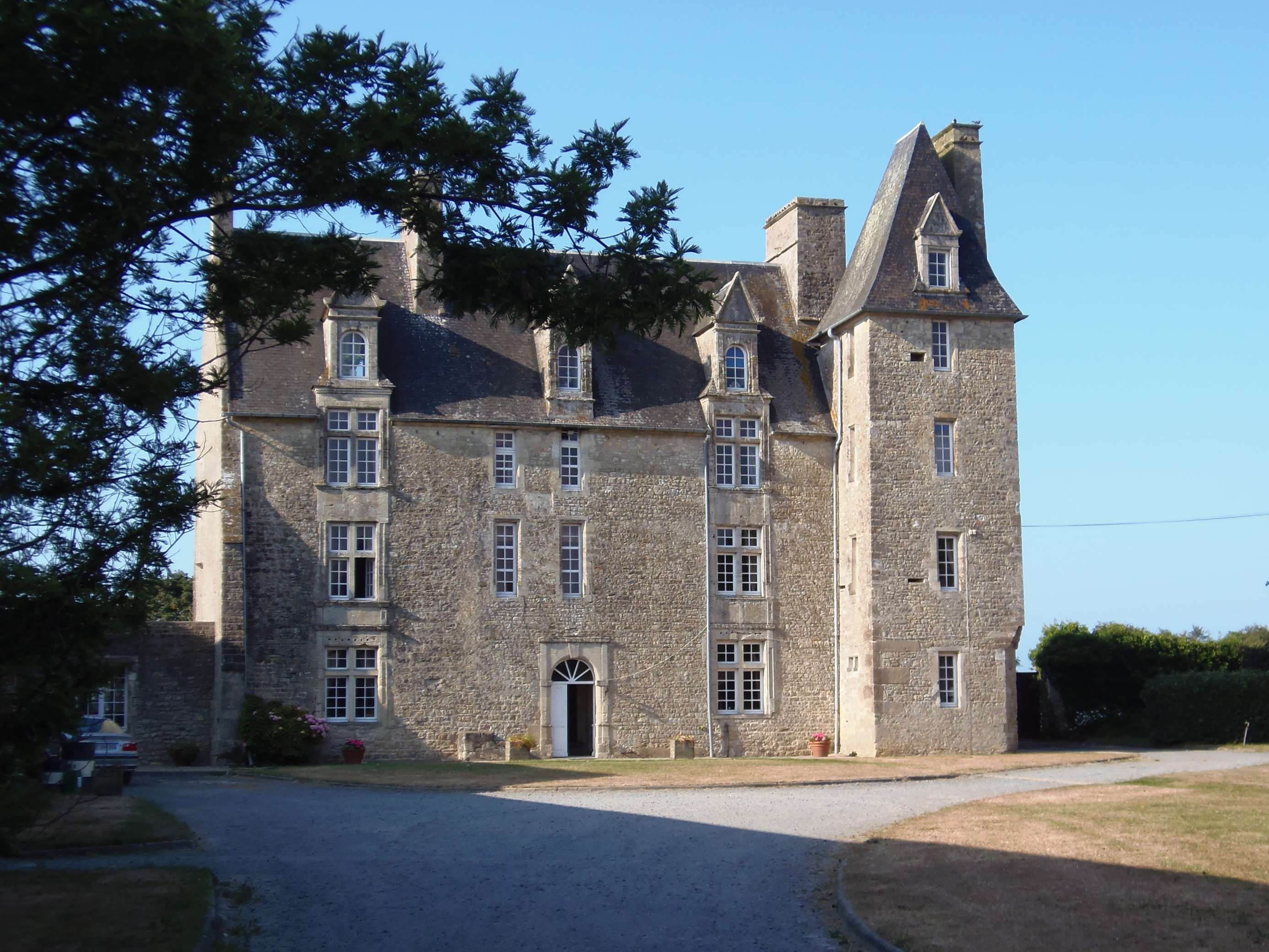
- The chateau in Saint-Pierre-du-Mont
- Location of Saint-Pierre-du-Mont
- Location within France Location within Normandy
- Coordinates: 49°23′13″N 0°58′25″W
- Country: France
- Region: Normandy
- Department: Calvados
- Arrondissement: Bayeux
- Canton: Trévières
- Intercommunality: CC Isigny-Omaha Intercom

Government
  - Mayor (2023–2026): Suzanne Gueroult
- Area^{1}: 4.96 km^{2} (1.92 sq mi)
- Elevation: 36 m (118 ft)
- Highest elevation: 42 m (138 ft)
- Lowest elevation: 0 m (0 ft)
- Population (2023): 72
  - Density: 15/km^{2} (38/sq mi)
- Time zone: UTC+01:00 (CET)
  - Summer (DST): UTC+02:00 (CEST)
- INSEE/Postal code: 14652 /14450
- ^{1} French Land Register data, which excludes lakes, ponds, glaciers > 1 km^{2} (0.386 sq mi or 247 acres) and river estuaries.

Saint-Pierre-du-Mont (French pronunciation: [sɛ̃ pjɛʁ dy mɔ̃]) is a commune in the Calvados department in the Normandy region in northwestern France.

== History ==
=== World War II ===
During World War II, the area was heavily bombarded on several occasions during May and early June 1944 by Allied bombers, attacking German coastal fortifications of the Atlantic Wall just north of the commune along the coast.

Saint-Pierre-du-Mont was liberated by American Ranger forces on 7 June 1944 after moving inland from Pointe du Hoc. The area north of the commune was used by the United States Army Air Forces as a combat airfield, known as Advanced Landing Ground "A-1" (Saint-Pierre-du-Mont). The airfield was used between early June and September 1944. It was abandoned after the Americans moved east into Central France with the advancing Allied Armies.

== Population ==
Historical population
Year	Pop.	±% p.a.
1968	111	—
1975	84	−3.90%
1982	78	−1.05%
1990	84	+0.93%
1999	85	+0.13%
2007	79	−0.91%
2012	73	−1.57%
2017	80	+1.85%
2023	72	−1.74%
Source: INSEE

== See also ==
- Communes of the Calvados department
