= Saint-Pierre-des-Ifs, Calvados =

Saint-Pierre-des-Ifs
- Commune
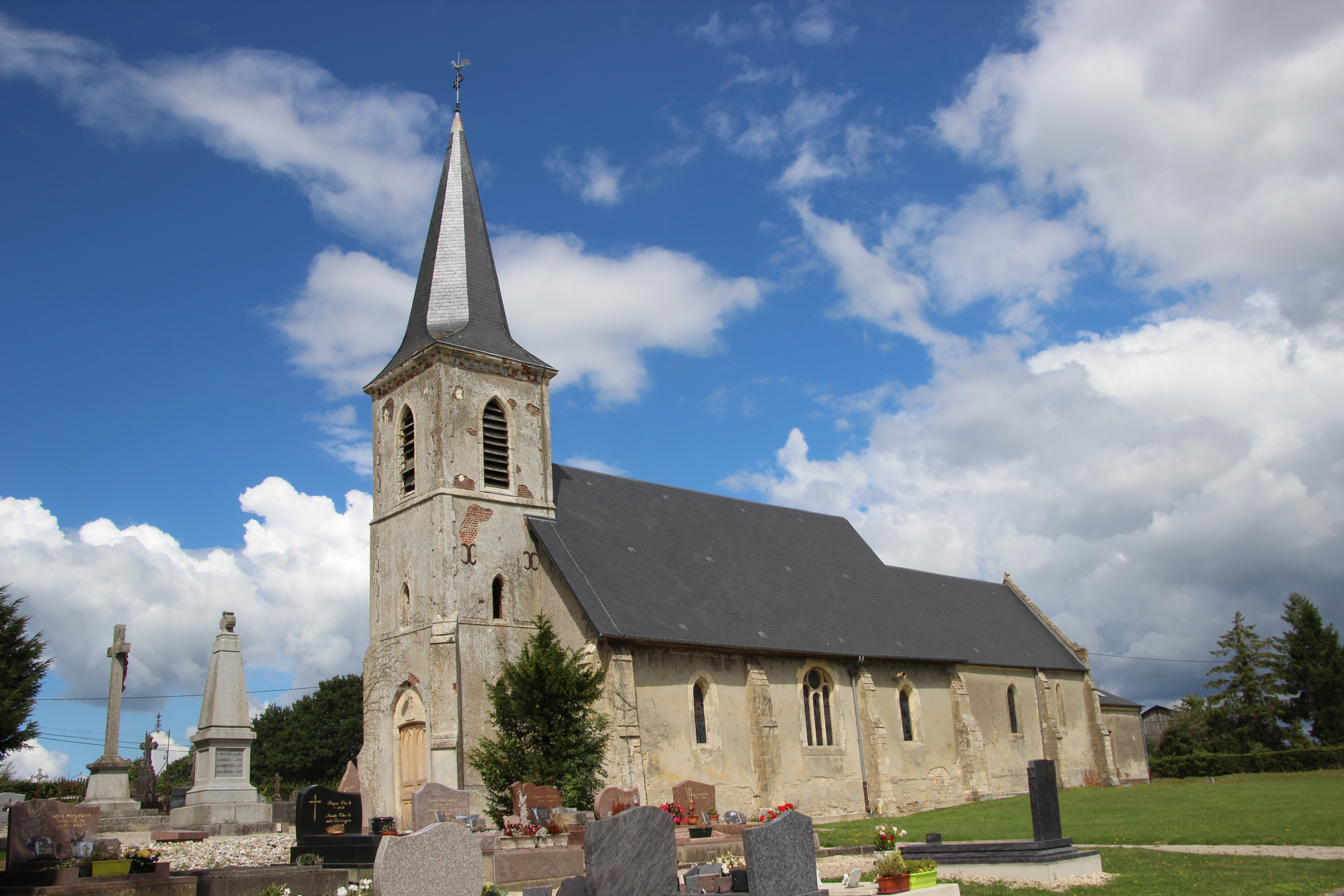
- The church in Saint-Pierre-des-Ifs
- Location of Saint-Pierre-des-Ifs
- Location within France Location within Normandy
- Coordinates: 49°06′48″N 0°09′30″E
- Country: France
- Region: Normandy
- Department: Calvados
- Arrondissement: Lisieux
- Canton: Mézidon Vallée d'Auge
- Intercommunality: CA Lisieux Normandie

Government
  - Mayor (2020–2026): Colette Malherbe
- Area^{1}: 11.16 km^{2} (4.31 sq mi)
- Elevation: 250 m (820 ft)
- Highest elevation: 177 m (581 ft)
- Lowest elevation: 83 m (272 ft)
- Population (2023): 453
  - Density: 40.6/km^{2} (105/sq mi)
- Time zone: UTC+01:00 (CET)
  - Summer (DST): UTC+02:00 (CEST)
- INSEE/Postal code: 14648 /14100
- ^{1} French Land Register data, which excludes lakes, ponds, glaciers > 1 km^{2} (0.386 sq mi or 247 acres) and river estuaries.

Saint-Pierre-des-Ifs (French pronunciation: [sɛ̃ pjɛʁ de.z‿if]) is a commune in the Calvados department in the Normandy region in northwestern France.

== Population ==
Historical population
| Year | Pop. | ±% p.a. |
|---|---|---|
| 1968 | 255 | — |
| 1975 | 283 | +1.50% |
| 1982 | 332 | +2.31% |
| 1990 | 346 | +0.52% |
| 1999 | 385 | +1.19% |
| 2007 | 451 | +2.00% |
| 2012 | 475 | +1.04% |
| 2017 | 451 | −1.03% |
| 2023 | 453 | +0.07% |
Source: INSEE

== See also ==
- Communes of the Calvados department
