= Saint-Pierre-du-Mont, Nièvre =

Saint-Pierre-du-Mont
- Commune
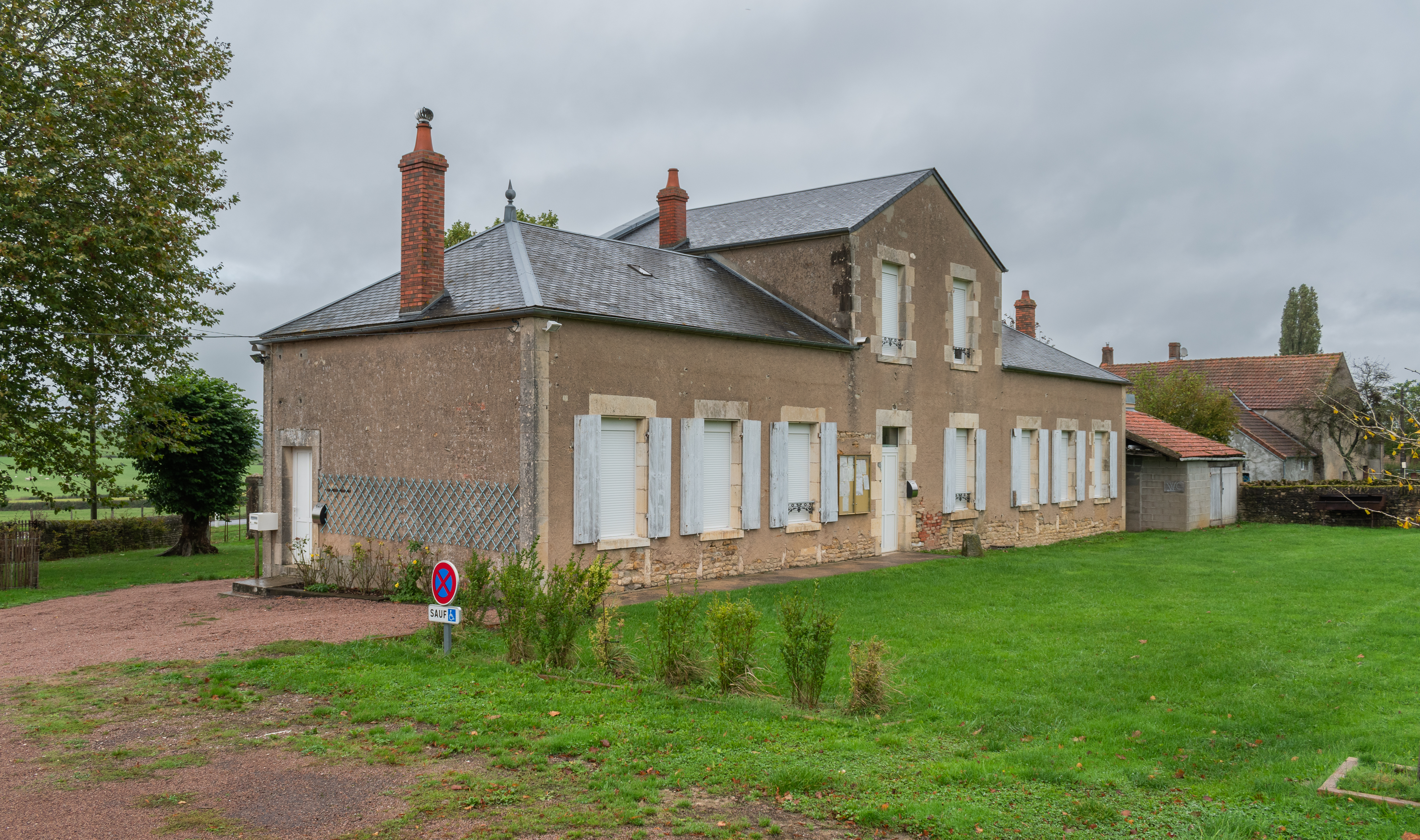
- Town hall of St-Pierre-du-Mont Nievre

- Coat of arms
- Location of Saint-Pierre-du-Mont
- Location within France Location within Bourgogne-Franche-Comté
- Coordinates: 47°23′25″N 3°26′45″E
- Country: France
- Region: Bourgogne-Franche-Comté
- Department: Nièvre
- Arrondissement: Clamecy
- Canton: Clamecy
- Intercommunality: Haut Nivernais-Val d'Yonne

Government
  - Mayor (2020–2026): Jean Jacques Mey
- Area^{1}: 17.57 km^{2} (6.78 sq mi)
- Highest elevation: 320 m (1,050 ft)
- Lowest elevation: 178 m (584 ft)
- Population (2023): 165
  - Density: 9.39/km^{2} (24.3/sq mi)
- Time zone: UTC+01:00 (CET)
  - Summer (DST): UTC+02:00 (CEST)
- INSEE/Postal code: 58263 /58210
- ^{1} French Land Register data, which excludes lakes, ponds, glaciers > 1 km^{2} (0.386 sq mi or 247 acres) and river estuaries.

Saint-Pierre-du-Mont (French pronunciation: [sɛ̃ pjɛʁ dy mɔ̃]) is a commune in the Nièvre department in central France.

== See also ==
- Communes of the Nièvre department
