= Saint-Pierre-des-Ifs, Eure =

Saint-Pierre-des-Ifs
- Commune
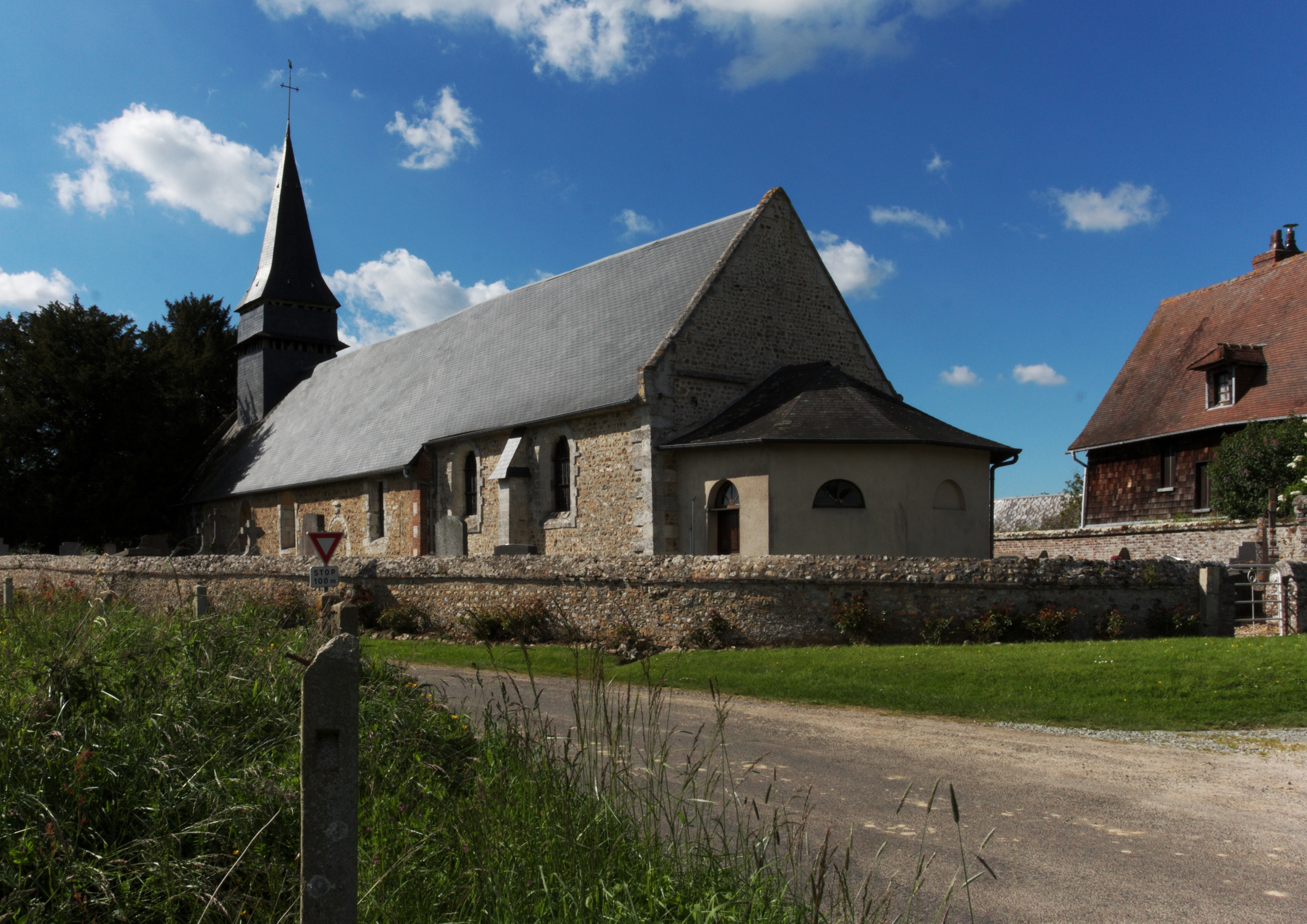
- The church in Saint-Pierre-des-Ifs
- Location of Saint-Pierre-des-Ifs
- Location within France Location within Normandy
- Coordinates: 49°16′14″N 0°36′34″E
- Country: France
- Region: Normandy
- Department: Eure
- Arrondissement: Bernay
- Canton: Beuzeville

Government
  - Mayor (2022–2026): Christophe Lefebvre
- Area^{1}: 6.17 km^{2} (2.38 sq mi)
- Elevation: 110 m (360 ft)
- Highest elevation: 162 m (531 ft)
- Lowest elevation: 130 m (430 ft)
- Population (2023): 253
  - Density: 41.0/km^{2} (106/sq mi)
- Time zone: UTC+01:00 (CET)
  - Summer (DST): UTC+02:00 (CEST)
- INSEE/Postal code: 27594 /27450
- ^{1} French Land Register data, which excludes lakes, ponds, glaciers > 1 km^{2} (0.386 sq mi or 247 acres) and river estuaries.

Saint-Pierre-des-Ifs (French pronunciation: [sɛ̃ pjɛʁ de.z‿if]) is a commune in the Eure department in Normandy in northern France.

== Population ==
Historical population
Year	Pop.	±% p.a.
1968	240	—
1975	202	−2.43%
1982	223	+1.42%
1990	181	−2.57%
1999	197	+0.95%
2007	229	+1.90%
2012	297	+5.34%
2017	277	−1.38%
2023	253	−1.50%
Source: INSEE

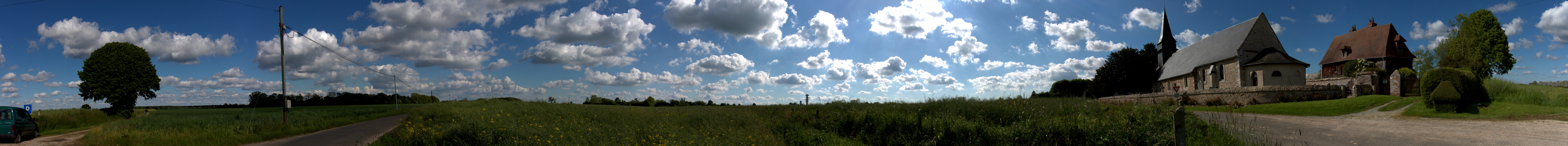
At the church Saint-Pierre

== See also ==
- Communes of the Eure department
