= Les Sept Laux =

Group of winter sports resorts located in the Alps

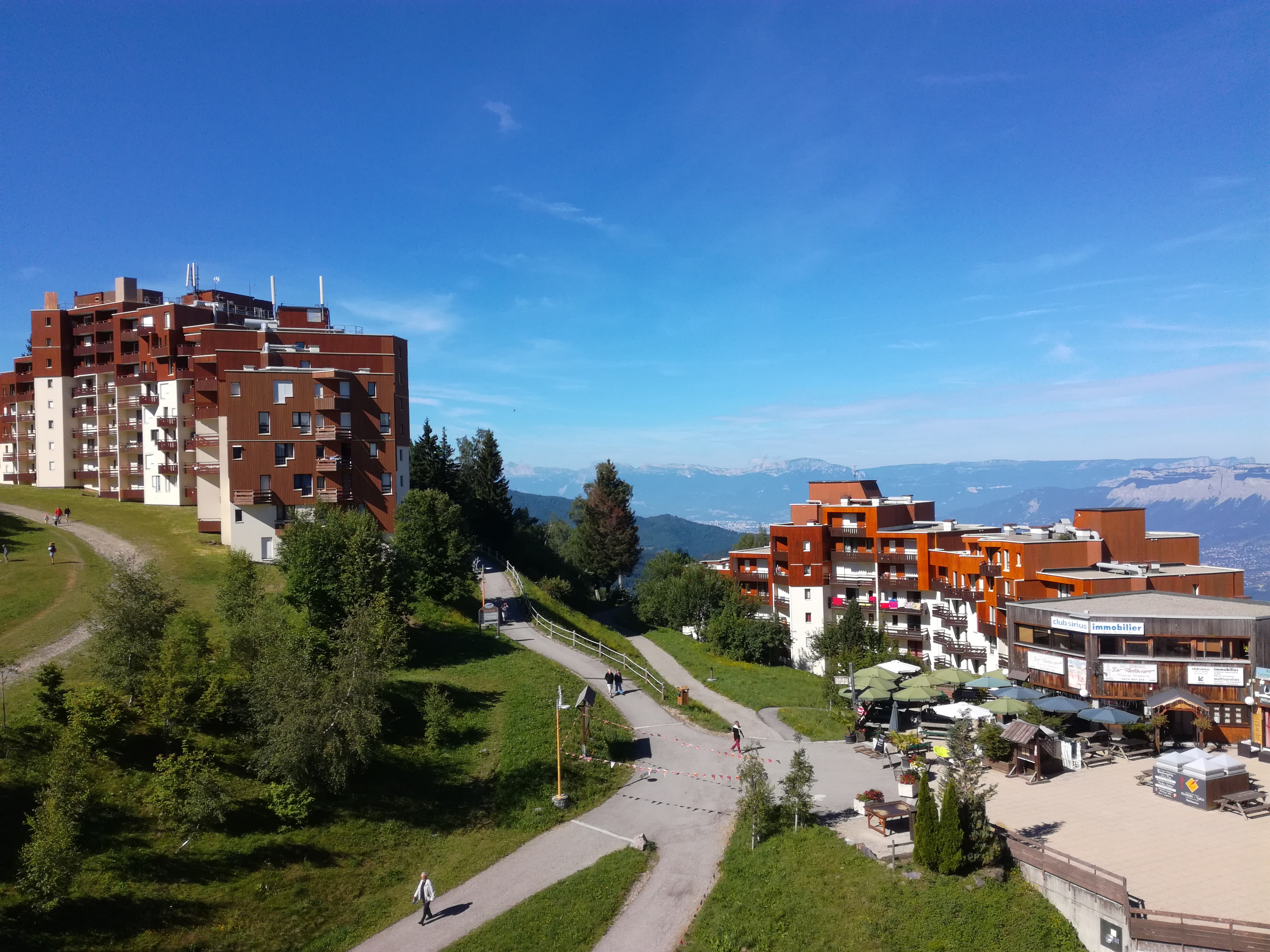
- Prapoutel ski resort

- Location within Alps
- Location: Les Adrets, Theys, La Ferrière
- Nearest city: Grenoble
- Coordinates: 45.2557°N 5.9931°E
- Top elevation: 2,400 m (7,900 ft)
- Base elevation: 1,350 m (4,430 ft)
- Trails: 45
- Total length: 120 km (75 mi)
- Website: www.les7laux.com

Les Sept Laux is a group of three winter sports resorts of the Alps located in the Belledonne (Isère) about 35 km (22 mi) from Grenoble and 50 km (31 mi) from Chambery in the communes of Theys, Les Adrets and Le Haut-Bréda.

Les Sept Laux has two stations side valley of the Isère, (Prapoutel and Pipay) and one (Le Pleynet) on the other side of the massif.

== Climate ==
Climate data for Pipay (1991–2020 averages): elevation 1578m
Month	Jan	Feb	Mar	Apr	May	Jun	Jul	Aug	Sep	Oct	Nov	Dec	Year
Mean daily maximum °C (°F)	2.4 (36.3)	2.6 (36.7)	5.5 (41.9)	9.1 (48.4)	11.4 (52.5)	16.5 (61.7)	19.5 (67.1)	19.3 (66.7)	14.9 (58.8)	11.3 (52.3)	6.8 (44.2)	4.0 (39.2)	10.3 (50.5)
Daily mean °C (°F)	−1.1 (30.0)	−1.3 (29.7)	1.7 (35.1)	5.1 (41.2)	7.5 (45.5)	12.2 (54.0)	14.8 (58.6)	14.6 (58.3)	10.8 (51.4)	7.4 (45.3)	3.3 (37.9)	0.4 (32.7)	6.3 (43.3)
Mean daily minimum °C (°F)	−4.7 (23.5)	−5.2 (22.6)	−2.2 (28.0)	1.0 (33.8)	3.5 (38.3)	8.0 (46.4)	10.0 (50.0)	10.0 (50.0)	6.7 (44.1)	3.5 (38.3)	−0.2 (31.6)	−3.2 (26.2)	2.3 (36.1)
Average precipitation mm (inches)	113.3 (4.46)	97.8 (3.85)	112.1 (4.41)	110.0 (4.33)	186.3 (7.33)	156.4 (6.16)	128.8 (5.07)	122.7 (4.83)	108.4 (4.27)	128.5 (5.06)	139.2 (5.48)	142.3 (5.60)	1,545.8 (60.85)
Source: Météo-France
