= Theys =

- Commune
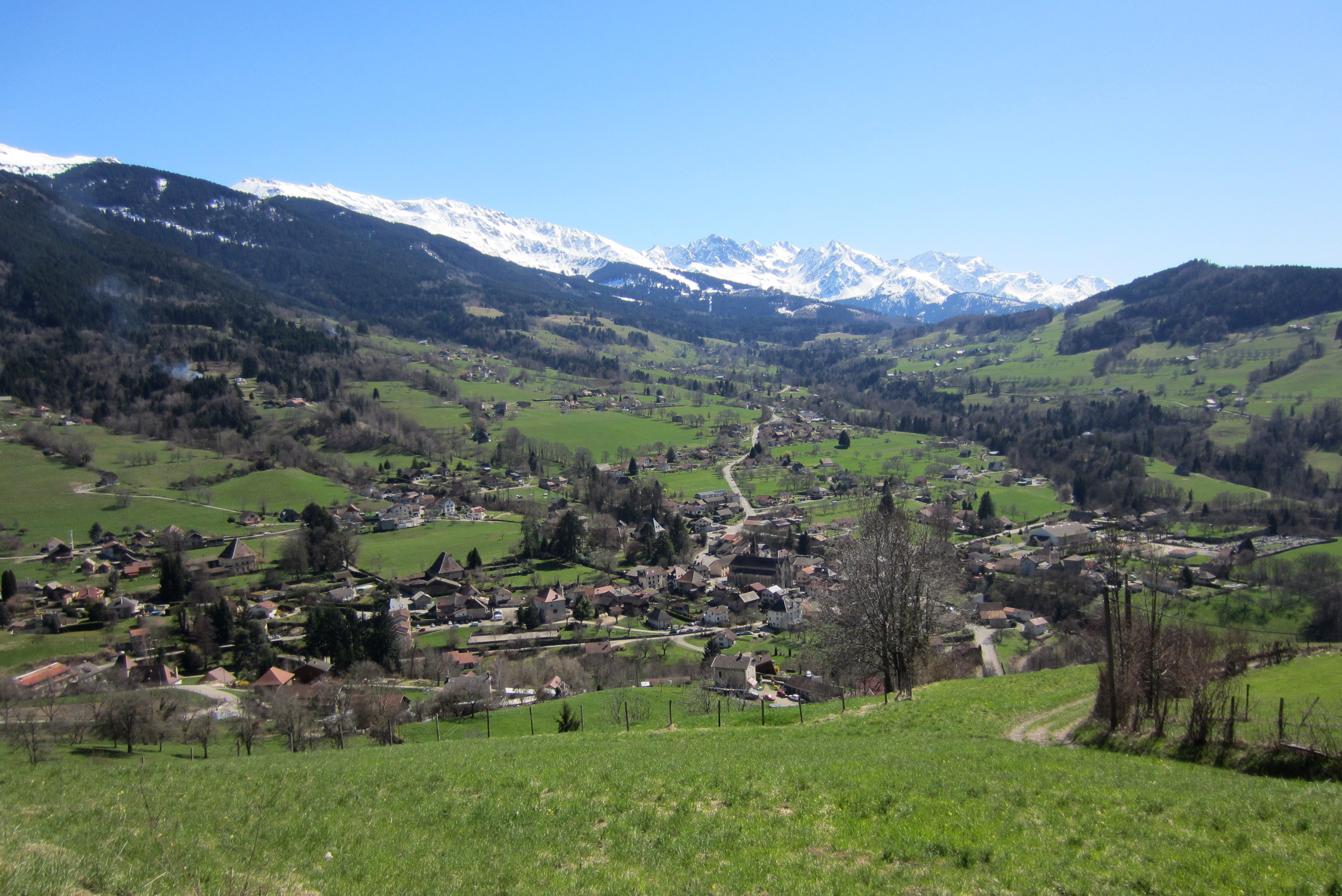
- A general view of Theys

- Coat of arms
- Location of Theys
- Location within France Location within Auvergne-Rhône-Alpes
- Coordinates: 45°18′04″N 5°59′52″E
- Country: France
- Region: Auvergne-Rhône-Alpes
- Department: Isère
- Arrondissement: Grenoble
- Canton: Le Haut-Grésivaudan
- Intercommunality: CC Le Grésivaudan

Government
  - Mayor (2020–2026): Régine Millet
- Area^{1}: 36 km^{2} (14 sq mi)
- Highest elevation: 2,124 m (6,969 ft)
- Lowest elevation: 320 m (1,050 ft)
- Population (2023): 2,011
  - Density: 56/km^{2} (140/sq mi)
- Time zone: UTC+01:00 (CET)
  - Summer (DST): UTC+02:00 (CEST)
- INSEE/Postal code: 38504 /38570
- ^{1} French Land Register data, which excludes lakes, ponds, glaciers > 1 km^{2} (0.386 sq mi or 247 acres) and river estuaries.

Theys (French pronunciation: [tɛs]; Arpitan: Tês) is a commune in the Isère department in southeastern France. It is one of the three communes of Les sept Laux winter sports resort.

== Population ==
Historical population

Year	Pop.	±% p.a.
1793	1,763	—
1821	2,230	+0.84%
1846	2,518	+0.49%
1872	2,294	−0.36%
1901	1,800	−0.83%
1926	1,385	−1.04%
1946	1,257	−0.48%
1962	1,227	−0.15%
1968	1,257	+0.40%

Year	Pop.	±% p.a.
1975	1,114	−1.71%
1982	1,200	+1.07%
1990	1,321	+1.21%
1999	1,572	+1.95%
2007	1,905	+2.43%
2012	1,991	+0.89%
2017	1,961	−0.30%
2023	2,011	+0.42%

Source: EHESS and INSEE (1968-2023)

== See also ==
- Communes of the Isère department
