= Les Adrets =

- Commune
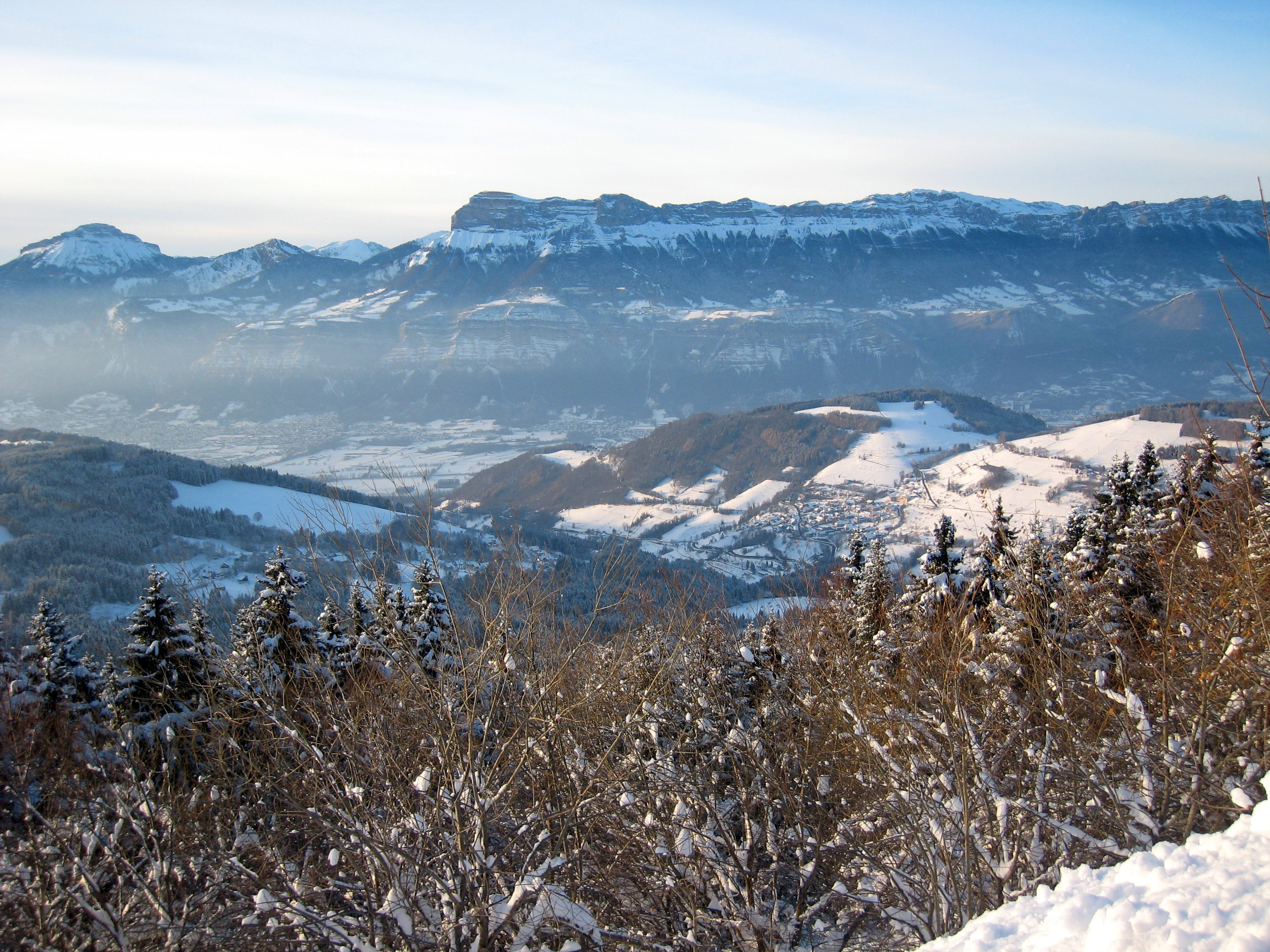
- Les Adrets and the Chartreuse, seen from Prapoutel

- Coat of arms
- Location of Les Adrets
- Location within France Location within Auvergne-Rhône-Alpes
- Coordinates: 45°16′21″N 5°57′55″E
- Country: France
- Region: Auvergne-Rhône-Alpes
- Department: Isère
- Arrondissement: Grenoble
- Canton: Le Haut-Grésivaudan
- Intercommunality: CC Le Grésivaudan

Government
  - Mayor (2022–2026): Delphine Perreau
- Area^{1}: 16 km^{2} (6.2 sq mi)
- Highest elevation: 2,440 m (8,010 ft)
- Lowest elevation: 560 m (1,840 ft)
- Population (2023): 1,079
  - Density: 67/km^{2} (170/sq mi)
- Time zone: UTC+01:00 (CET)
  - Summer (DST): UTC+02:00 (CEST)
- INSEE/Postal code: 38002 /38190
- ^{1} French Land Register data, which excludes lakes, ponds, glaciers > 1 km^{2} (0.386 sq mi or 247 acres) and river estuaries.

Les Adrets (French pronunciation: [le.z‿adʁɛ]) is a commune in the Isère department in southeastern France. It is situated 30 km (19 mi) northeast of Grenoble. It is one of the commune of the Les sept Laux winter sports resort.

== Population ==
Historical population
Year	Pop.	±% p.a.
1968	282	—
1975	297	+0.74%
1982	409	+4.68%
1990	481	+2.05%
1999	643	+3.28%
2007	743	+1.82%
2012	938	+4.77%
2017	1,006	+1.41%
2023	1,079	+1.17%
Source: INSEE

== See also ==
- Communes of the Isère department
