= La Ferrière, Isère =

La Ferrière
- Part of Le Haut-Bréda
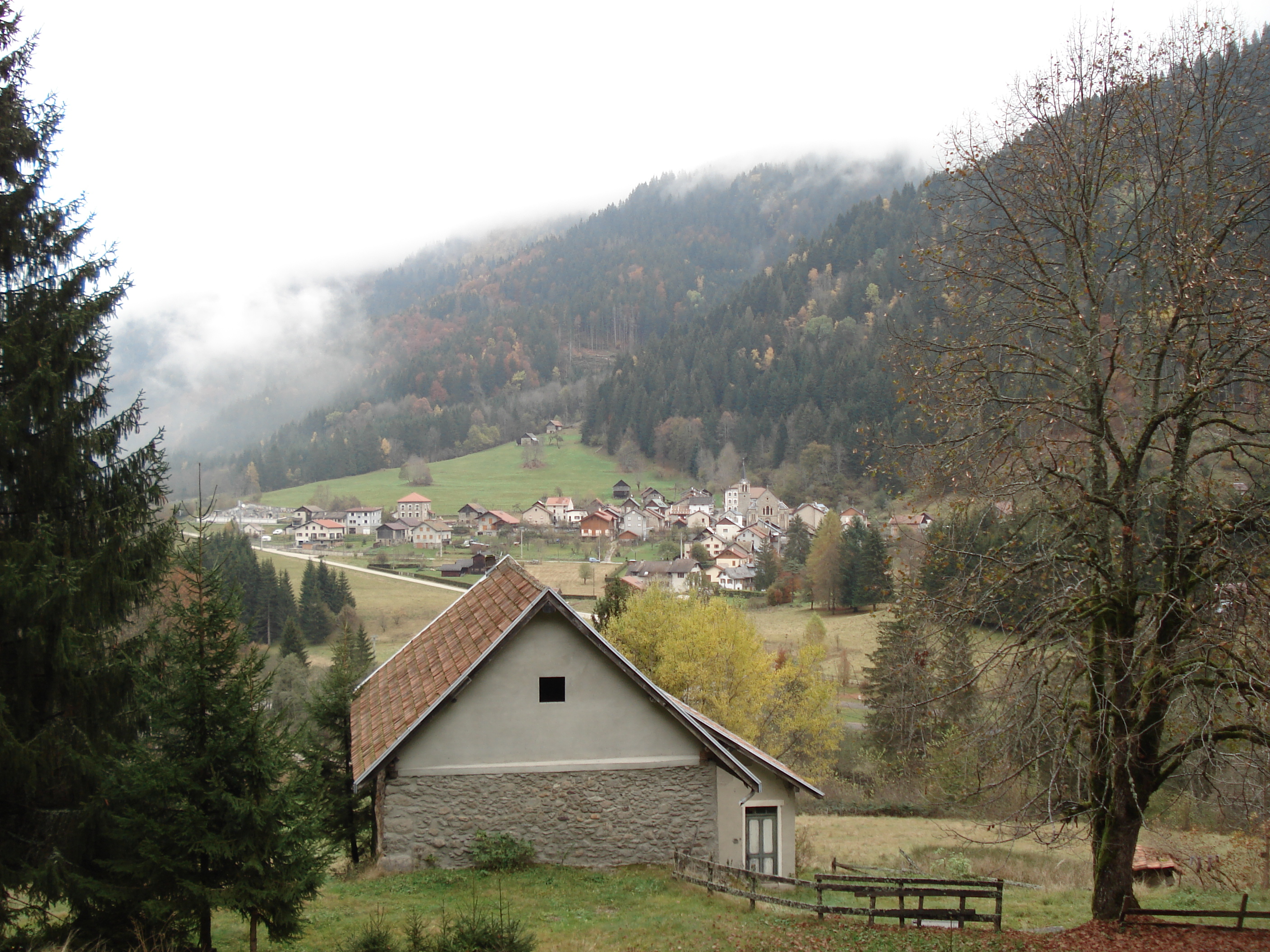
- A general view of La Ferrière
- Location of La Ferrière
- Location within France Location within Auvergne-Rhône-Alpes
- Coordinates: 45°19′14″N 6°05′16″E
- Country: France
- Region: Auvergne-Rhône-Alpes
- Department: Isère
- Arrondissement: Grenoble
- Canton: Le Haut-Grésivaudan
- Commune: Le Haut-Bréda
- Area^{1}: 54 km^{2} (21 sq mi)
- Elevation: 910 m (2,990 ft)
- Highest elevation: 2,928 m (9,606 ft)
- Lowest elevation: 812 m (2,664 ft)
- Population (2023): 256
  - Density: 4.7/km^{2} (12/sq mi)
- Time zone: UTC+01:00 (CET)
  - Summer (DST): UTC+02:00 (CEST)
- Postal code: 38580
- ^{1} French Land Register data, which excludes lakes, ponds, glaciers > 1 km^{2} (0.386 sq mi or 247 acres) and river estuaries.

La Ferrière (French pronunciation: [la fɛʁjɛʁ]) is a former commune in the Isère department in southeastern France. On 1 January 2019, it was merged into the new commune Le Haut-Bréda. It is one of the communes of the Les sept Laux winter sports resort.

== Geography ==
The village is crossed by a little river, the Bréda. It is located near the border with Savoy.

== See also ==
- Communes of the Isère department
