= Loreto Convent, Gibraltar =

Convent and school in Gibraltar

Coordinates: 36°07′35″N 5°20′58″W

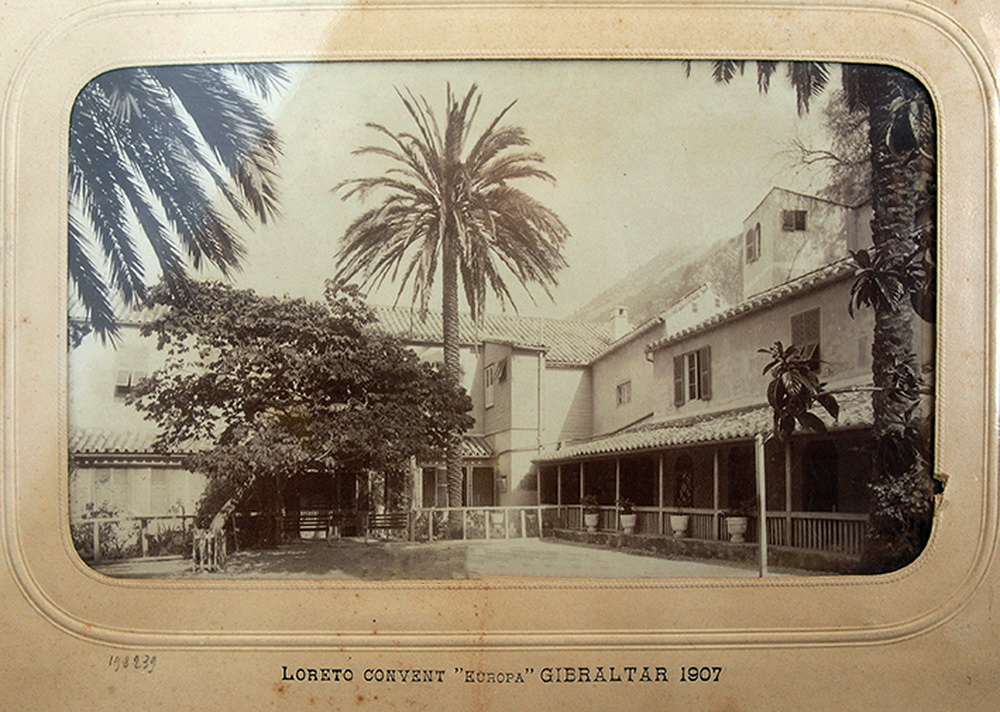
Loreto Convent, photographed by Jules David in 1907

The Loreto Convent is a convent and school in Gibraltar. It is run by the Loreto Nuns.
