= Jules David (photographer) =

French photographer

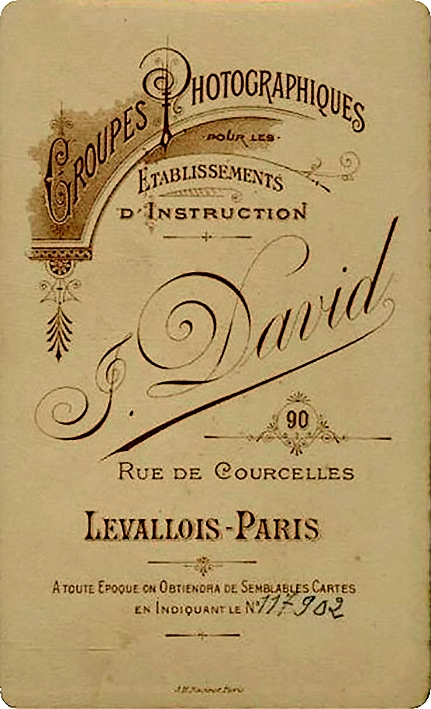
- Back of a carte de visite photograph
- Born: Jules David-Cavaz; 16 April 1848; Pinsot, France
- Died: 8 October 1923 (aged 75); Levallois-Perret, France
- Occupation: Photographer

The photographer Jules David is not to be confused with the lithographer Jules David.

Jules David, also Jules David-Cavaz (16 April 1848 – 8 October 1923), was a French photographer. In France, he was one of the first professional photographers to specialize in school photography. With his specialty, he built up an international career, often returning to schools, institutions and companies that he had worked with previously. Based in Levallois-Perret near Paris, he worked throughout Europe, and beyond, for almost forty years, traveling as far as Norway, Russia, Greece and Brazil.

== Life ==
Jules David-Cavaz was born the son of Jean David-Cavaz and Françoise Capitant in the hamlet of Charvin, near the village of Pinsot in the Isère department of South-Eastern France. His parents were propriétaires, land-owning farmers, so his family was probably not entirely poor.

Little is known about the first 20 years of his life. Nor do we know where he learned his photographic skills. In 1867, nineteen years old, he worked as an independent "group photographer" (photographe des groupes). In 1869 he was working with the photographer Claude Bretagne (1824–1880) in Leuven, Belgium. In 1870–1871 he served in the French army during the Franco-Prussian War. He left the army in August 1871 as a sergeant major. He was a recipient of the French Médaille militaire.

In 1873 David opened, together with Bretagne, a photo studio at the rue Gravel 54 in Levallois-Perret. The studio advertised specifically with "school photographs" (photographies des écoles), whereby schools included secondary schools, boarding schools, teacher training colleges and military academies. The association with Bretagne ended after two or three years, in 1875 or 1876, after which David set up his own studio at the rue Gravel 50. Levallois-Perret was to remain his home base for the rest of his life. After a short stay at the rue Trézel 19, in 1879 he moved to rue des Courcelles 90. In 1897 he won a bronze medal at the Brussels International Exposition. From 1902 to 1910 he lived in the Rue Rivay in Levallois-Perret.

On 8 October 1874 Jules David married Marie Cécile Mathilde Daman (1851-1929) in Leuven, Belgium, where his wife was born. There are indications that David became a relatively wealthy man and that he was involved in philanthropy. After World War I he volunteered to pay for a monument commemorating the dead in his birthplace Pinsot. He also donated a large sum to the local school, which the pupils then decided to devote to the rebuilding of the destroyed school in Manicamp, Northern France.

David died, aged 75, on 8 October 1923 in his home in the rue Président Wilson 90. He was survived by his wife Marie Cécile Mathilde Daman.

== Work ==
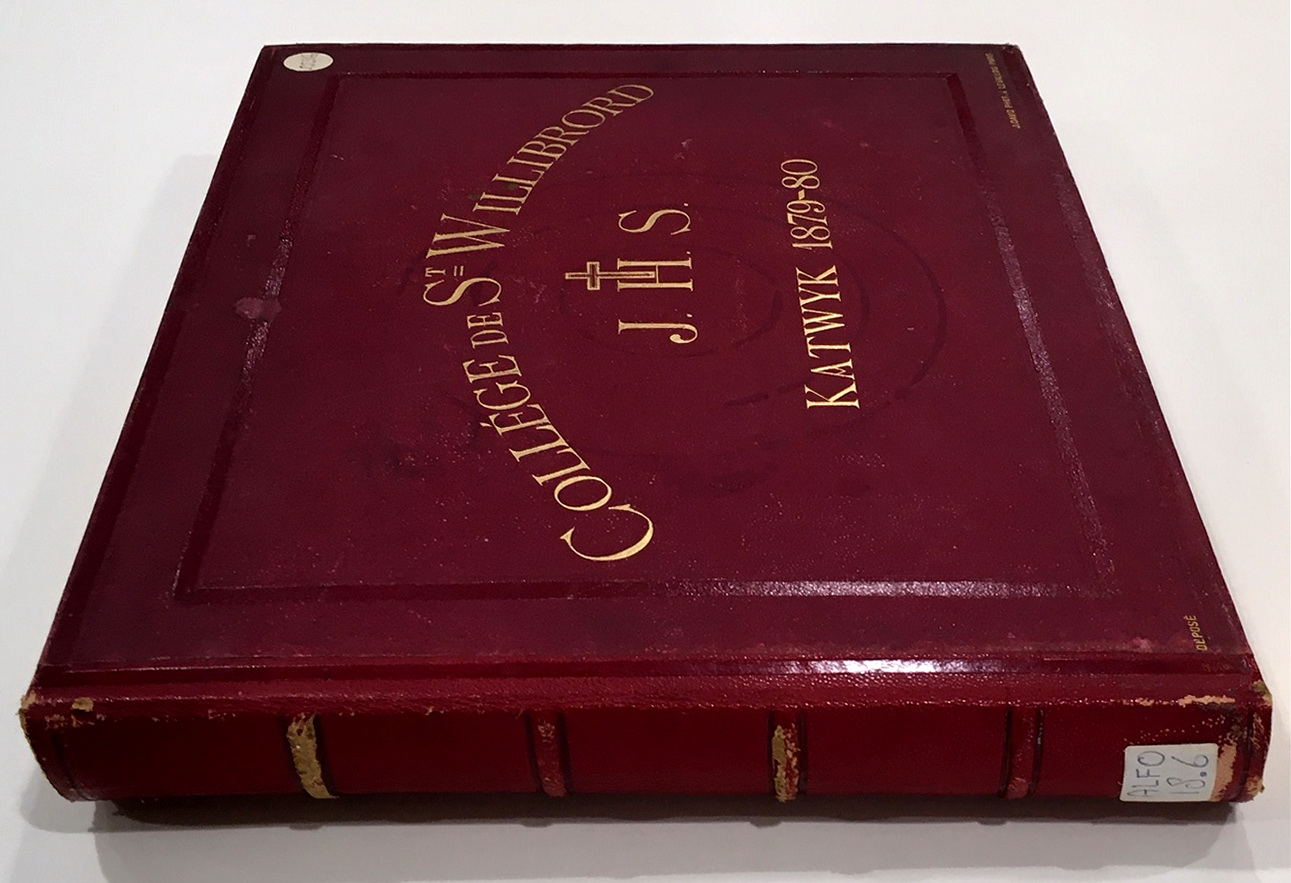
Photo album Collège de St. Willibrord I.H.S. Katwyk 1879–80, David's first commission in the Netherlands

David's work differs from that of the numerous traveling photographers of the late 19th century. Photography was still a relatively new discipline and in some regions of Europe few photo studios existed. Travelling photographers filled the gap, advertising their services wherever they went. Generally, portrait photography was all they had on offer. This was not the case with Jules David who carefully prepared his travels and almost exclusively worked with clients who wanted more than a simple portrait. His preferred clients were educational institutions of the bourgeoisie, among them military schools and boarding schools, where French was often the language of instruction.

As a rule, he would take a series of photographs of the building and its interior, he would then prepare a number of carefully composed group portraits of teachers and students, often complemented with 'action' photographs of students taking classes or involved in leisure activities. He then finished the production in his studio in Levallois. The finished product, often a luxury album bound in linen or red leather with imprints in gold, was sent free of charge to the head of the institution after which directors, teachers, students or employees would choose the images they wanted a copy of.

The demand for this type of photographs diminished towards the end of the century. There was more competition from local photographers who were able to provide schools with simpler – and thus cheaper – class photographs. The era of technical challenges and carefully prepared compositions was over. David ended his international career shortly after 1910, after which he exclusively worked in France. With his associate Edmond Vallois he ran a photo studio at the rue de Rennes in Paris. Many of his negatives on glass were sold to the then flourishing picture postcard industry, which after his retirement remained an important source of income for his successor Vallois.

== Photographs ==
=== France ===
Jules David worked in France as a photographer specialized in school photography from 1867 until around 1915. The majority of his clients were schools and Catholic institutions. Judging by the number of photographs of Paris sixth-form colleges (lycées), quite a few of them made use of his services. However, his reputation in France was not limited to 'school photography', as can be deducted from the prestigious commission to portray the French president Jules Grévy and his military staff in the garden of the Élysée Palace. Other well-known people were photographed by David: a photograph of Gustave Eiffel with his wife and children shows them relaxing in their garden in Levallois-Perret. His work in France continued after 1875, even when increasingly spending time abroad.

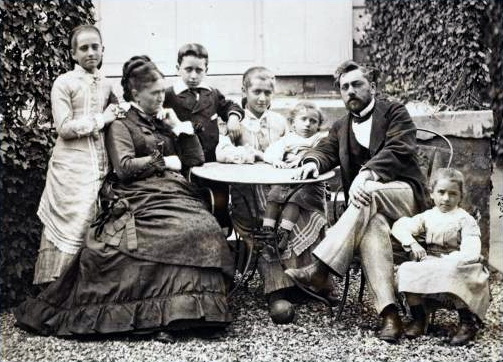
Gustave Eiffel and family in Levallois-Perret (ca. 1875)

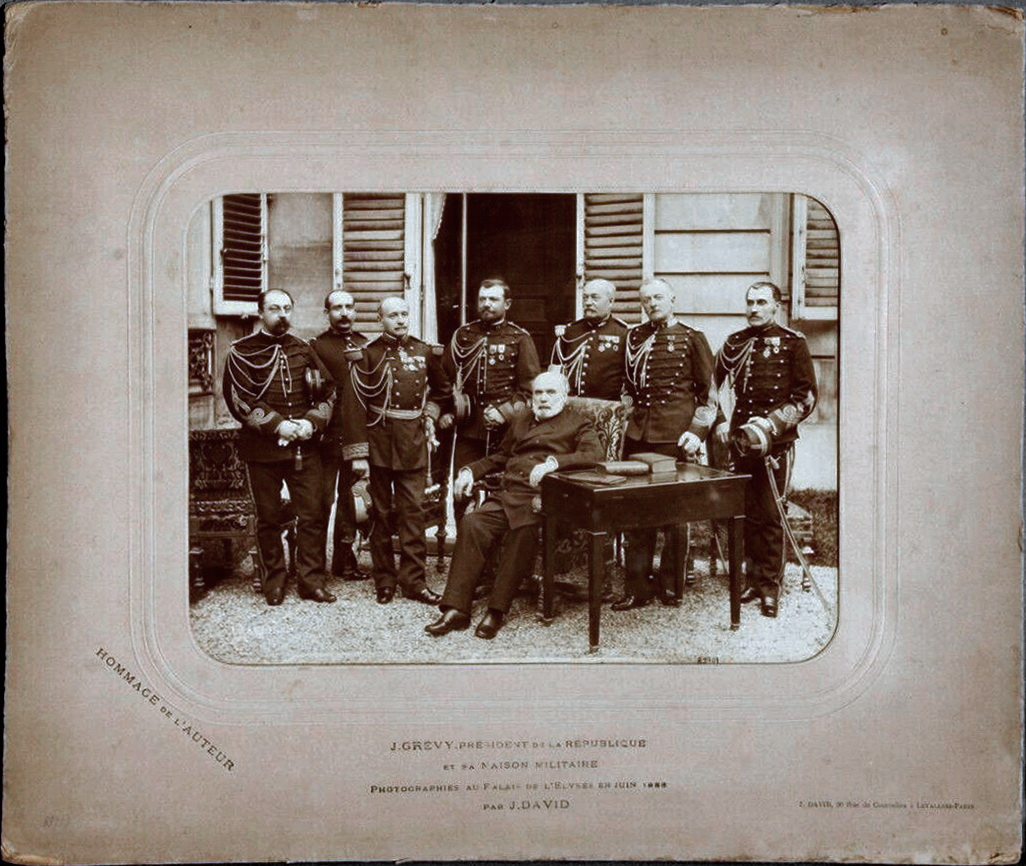
President Jules Grévy and military staff at the Élysée Palace (1886)

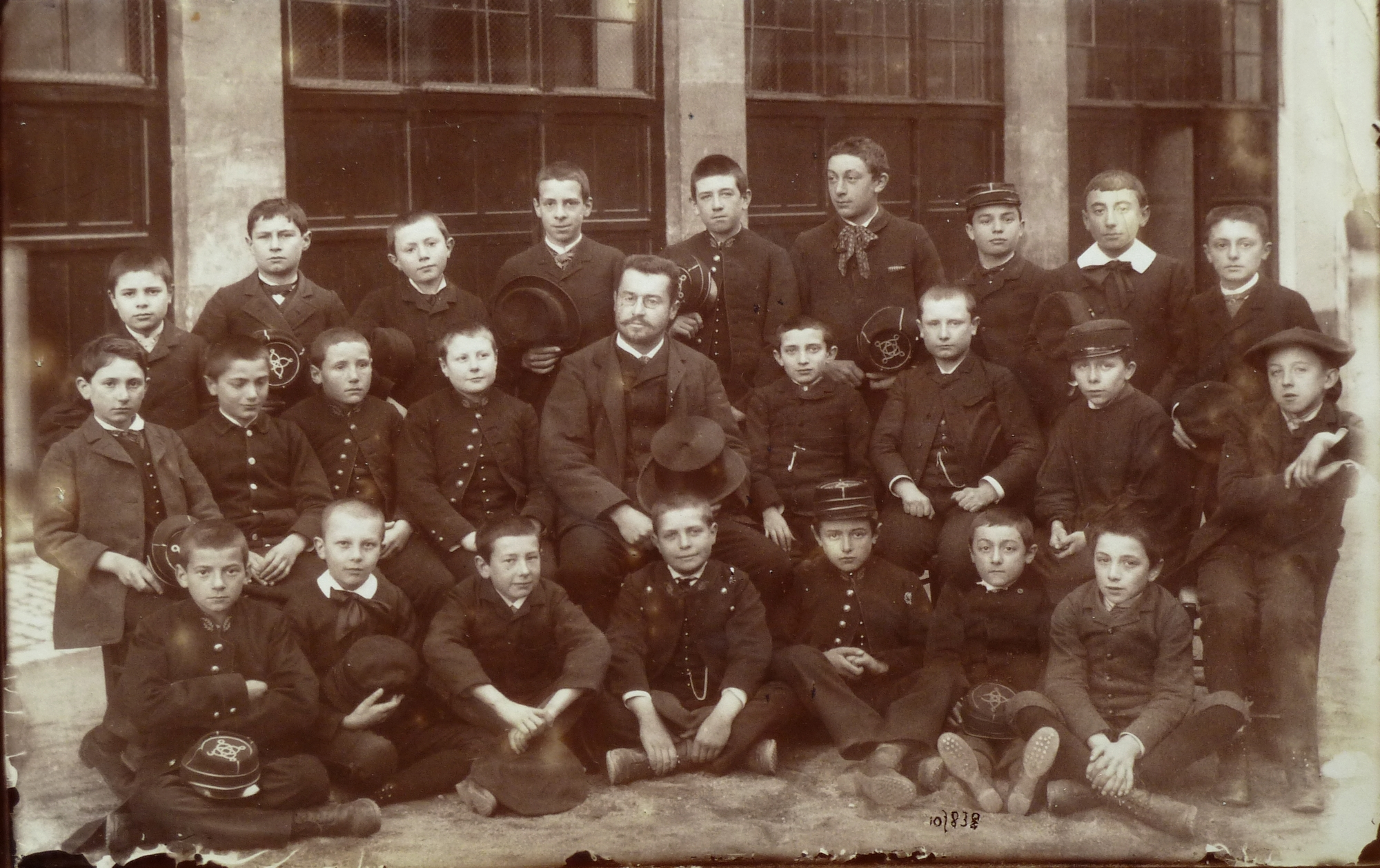
Class photograph, Lycée Pothier, Orléans (1887)

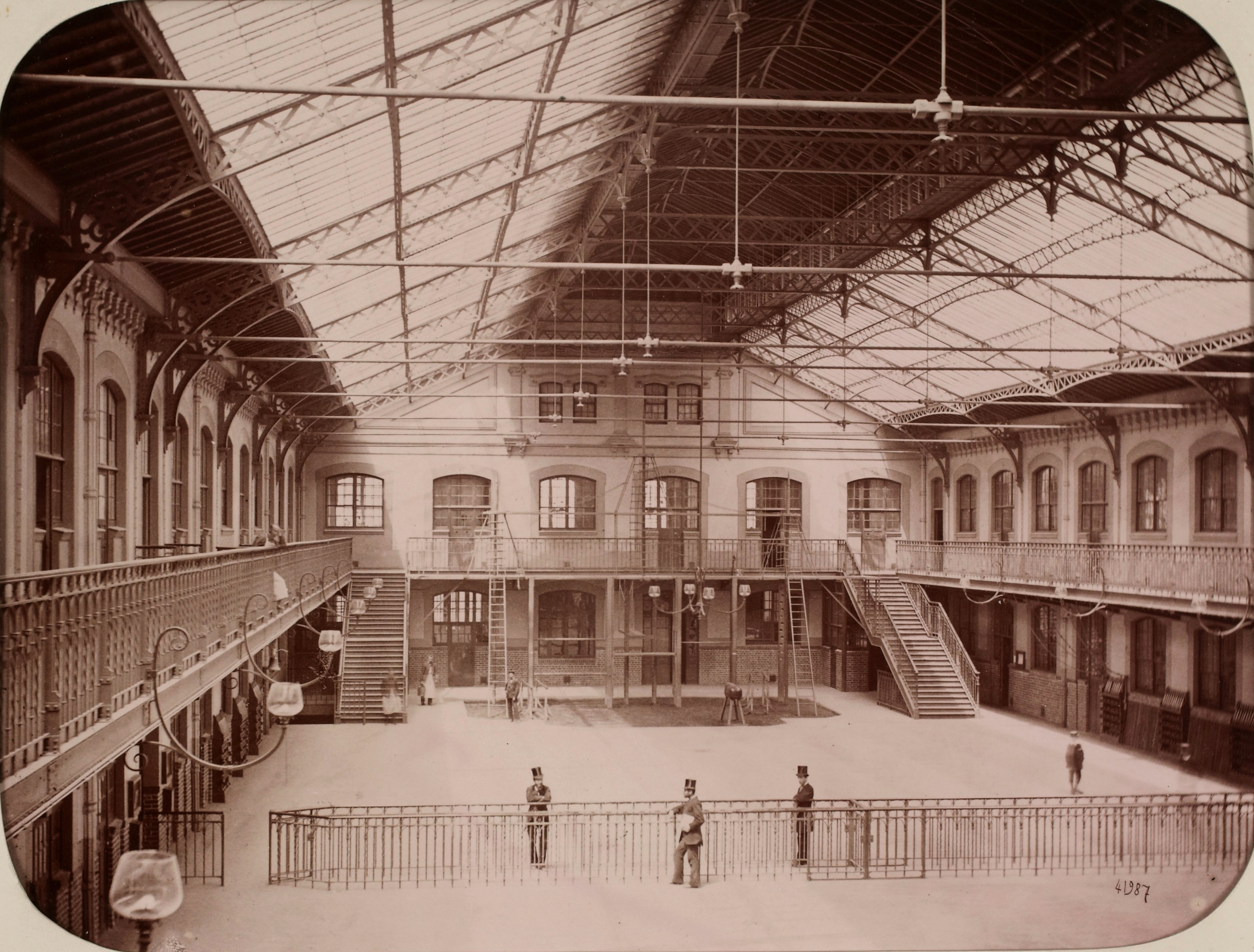
Central hall, École Monge, Paris (1890)

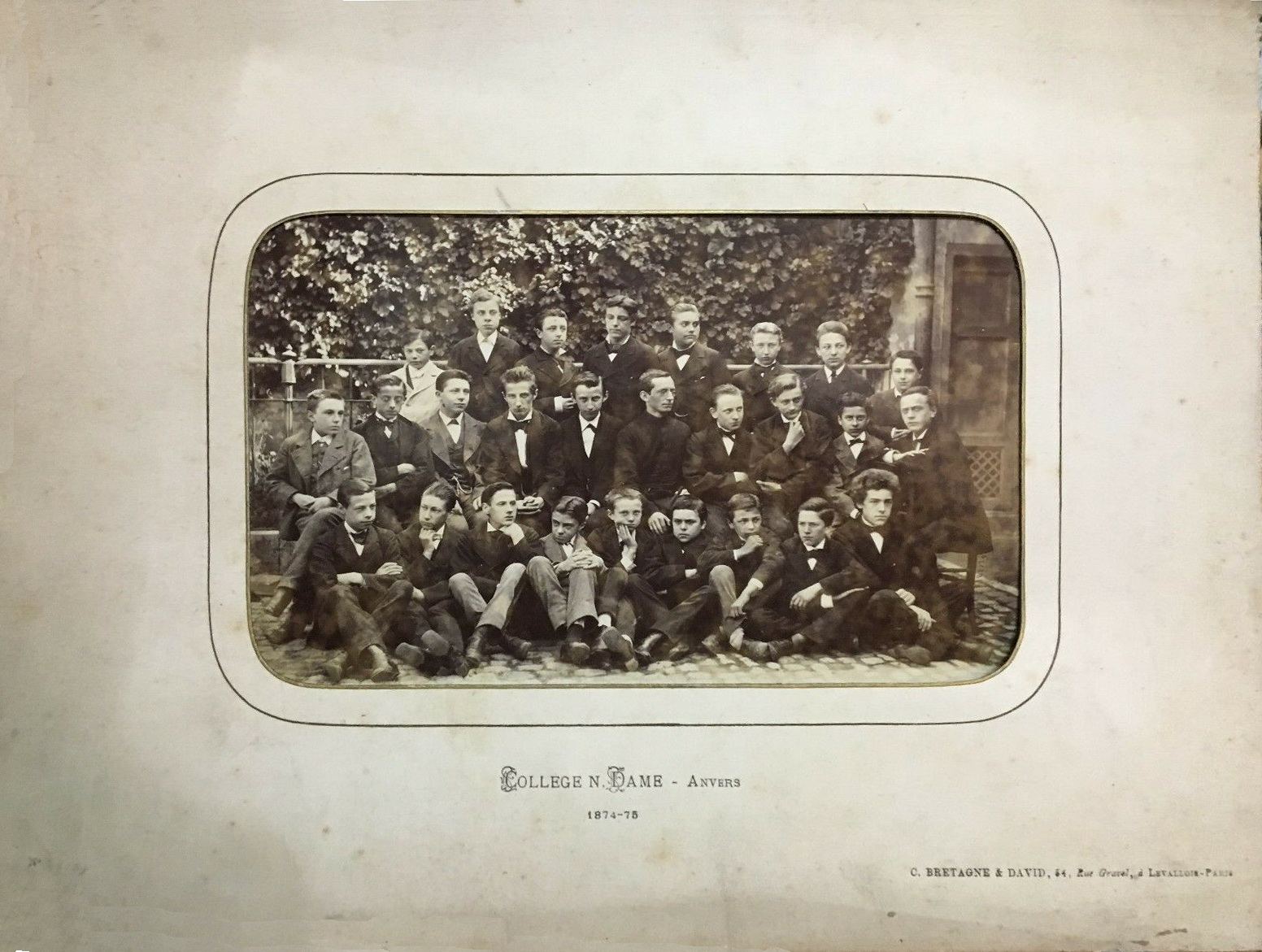
Class of 1874/75, Our Lady College, Antwerp, by Claude Bretagne & Jules David, one of David's oldest known photographs

=== Belgium and Netherlands ===
The first country outside France where David received commissions was Belgium. In 1874, while still associated with Claude Bretagne, he worked in Antwerp and Verviers. Perhaps not entirely accidental, one of his last recorded trips abroad in 1911 was also to Verviers. An important commission, possibly given to him by the bishop of Namur, mgr. Théodore-Joseph Gravez, led in 1878 to the publication of the leather-bound album L'Episcopat Belge 1878, which included portraits of all Belgian bishops, their cathedrals and their episcopal palaces. He must have returned to the country at least fourteen times, each time taking commissions from more than one client.

In the Netherlands, professional school photography was introduced by Jules David in the school year 1879–1880. Between 1879 and 1908 he visited the country at least twenty times. As in France and Belgium, his main clients were Catholic institutions, notably Jesuit and Ursuline boarding schools. However, his best client in the Netherlands was the Royal Naval College in Den Helder, which he visited eight times between 1883 and 1905. Other favoured clients were Rolduc, a Catholic boarding school for boys (6 commissions) and the Episcopal College St. Joseph in Weert (5 commissions).

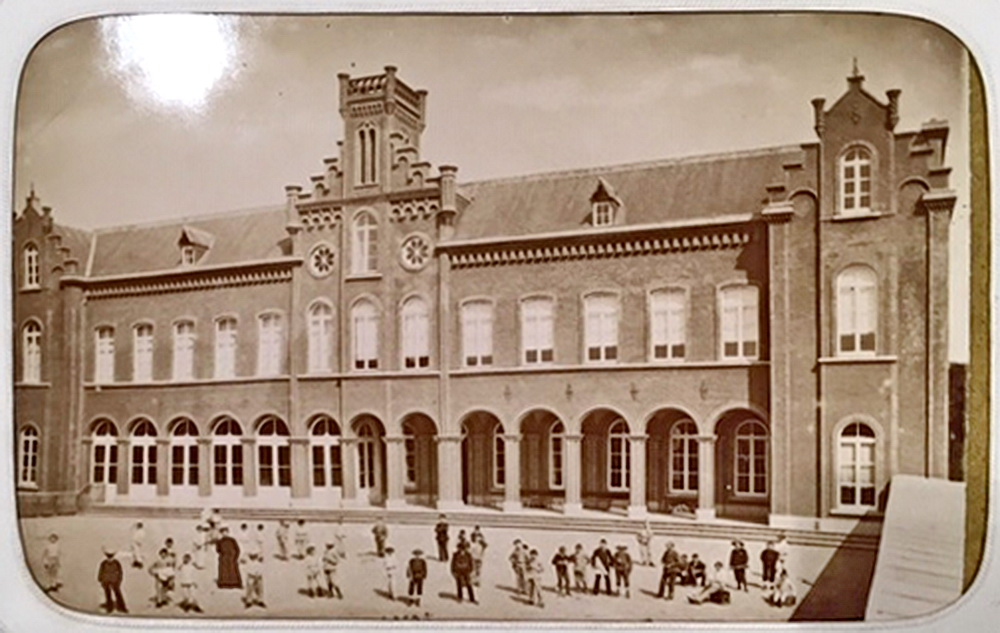
Jesuit school St. Willibrord, Katwijk a/d Rijn (1879/80)

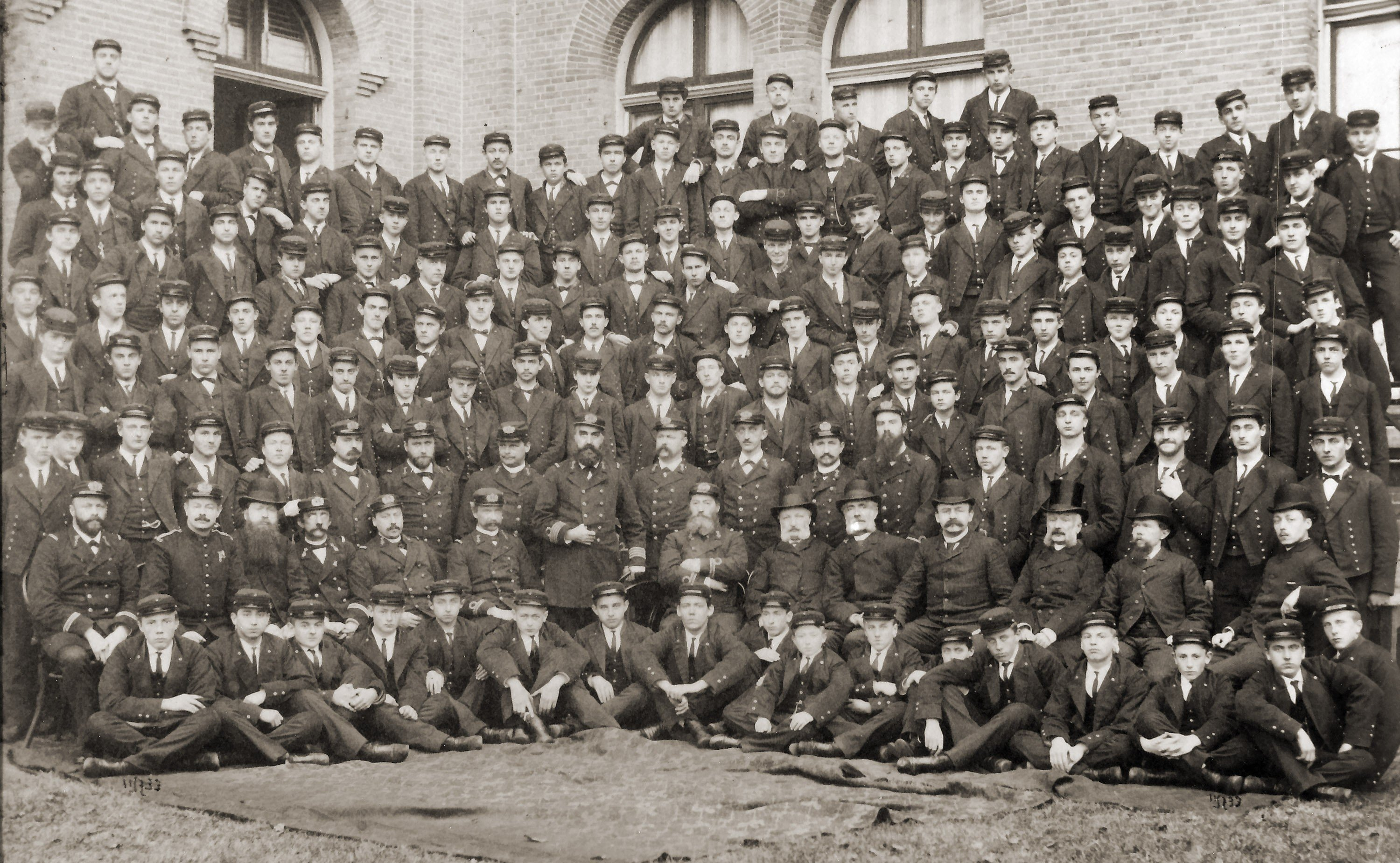
Students of Royal Dutch Navy Institute, Den Helder (1889)

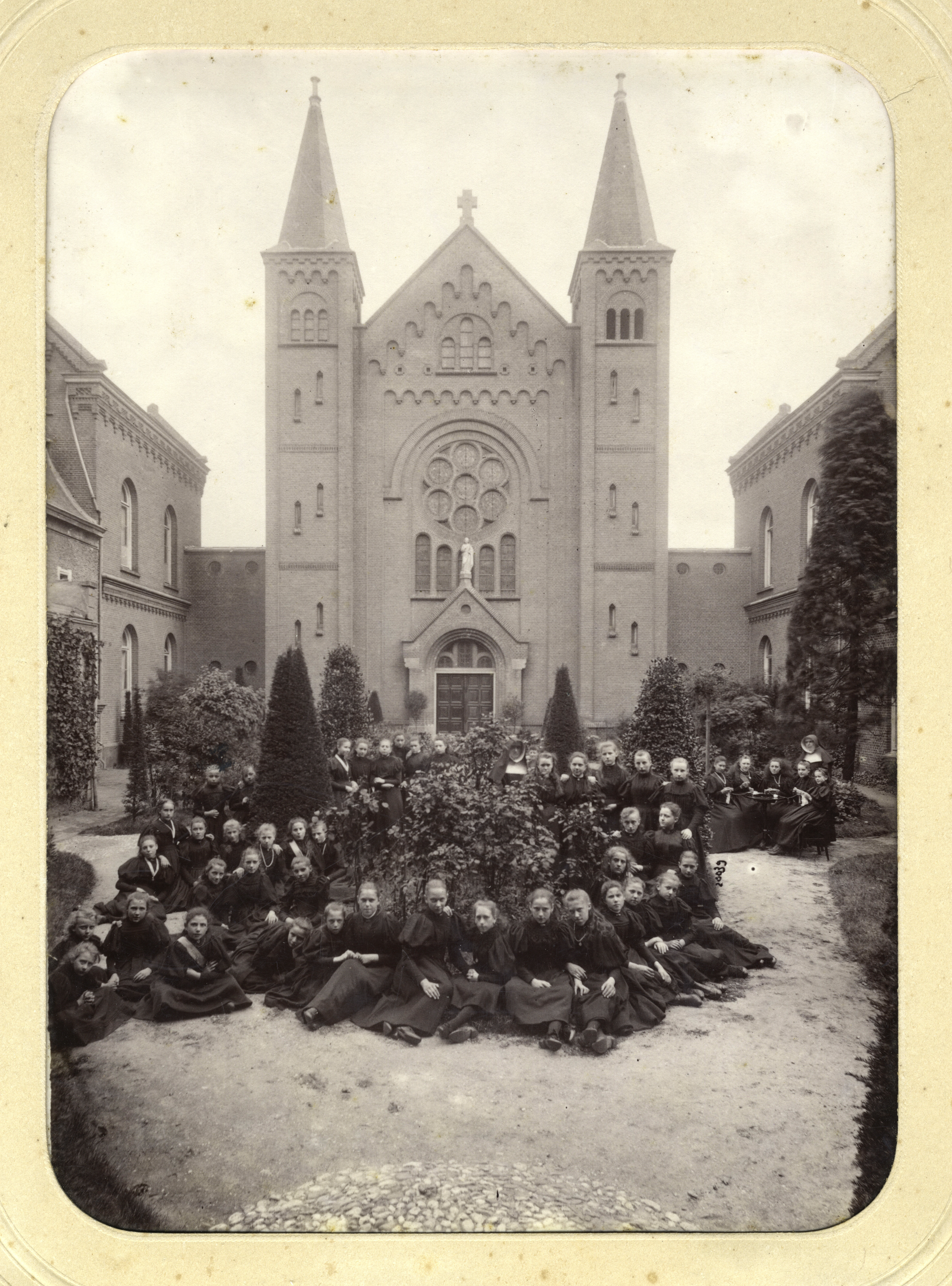
Pupils of Ursuline school posing at the village church, Uden (1896/97)

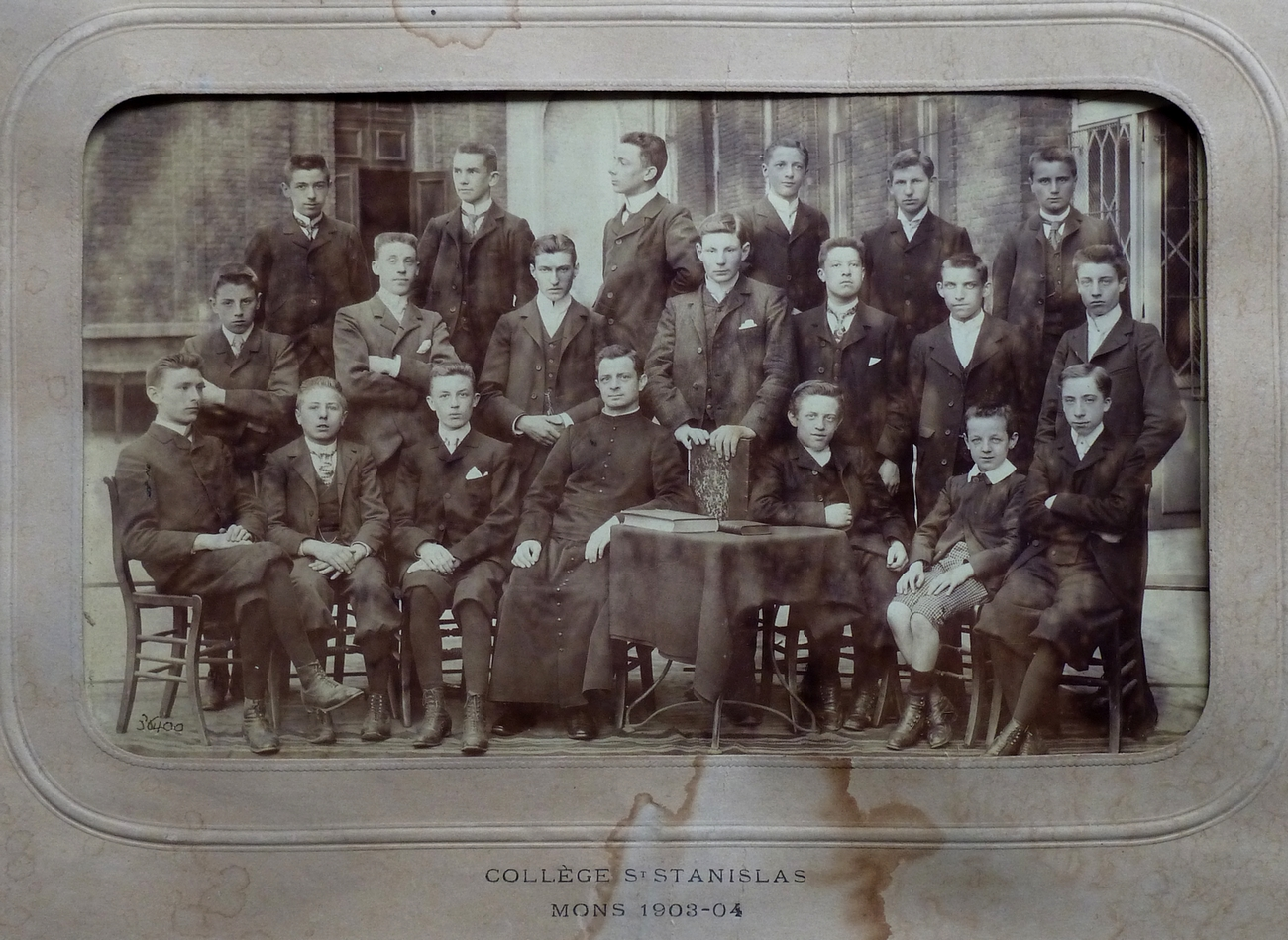
Collège Saint-Stanislas, Namur (1903)

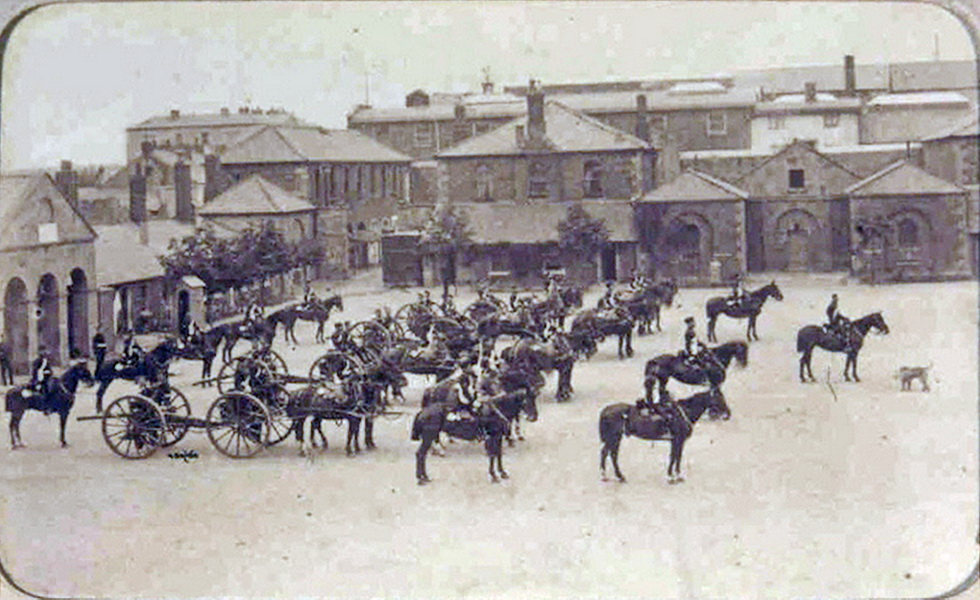
9th Field Battery Royal Artillery, Limerick (1898)

=== British Isles ===
In Britain and Ireland, David was employed by the military. In York he photographed the 2nd Dragoon Guards (Queen's Bays) in 1899 (an album with 34 photographs). He also worked at the Royal Military College, Sandhurst, as well as in the Loreto Convent in Gibraltar. In Limerick, Ireland, he photographed the 9th Field Battery of the Royal Artillery in the courtyard of the Mulgrave Street barracks in 1898.

=== Northern Europe ===
In Scandinavia, he counted many schools among his clients, as well as military institutions and private businesses. He visited Denmark at least once but only photographs of schools in Copenhagen are recorded (1889/90). In Norway the emphasis lay on school photography, although he also had firemen posing in front of his camera, as well as workers at an arms manufacturer (1890, 1892, 1893/94, 1895, 1898, 1899, 1903 and 1908). In Sweden his clients consisted of shipbuilders, a paper factory and a railway company, as well as schools and military institutions, including an equestrian portrait of Prince Carl, Duke of Västergötland (1892, 1894, 1900, 1901 and at least once between 1905 and 1910). In Finland, David took photographs of the various infantry battalions of the Army of the Grand Duchy of Finland (1880s and 1890s). The Finnish revolutionary leader Johan Kock was photographed by David while in Paris.

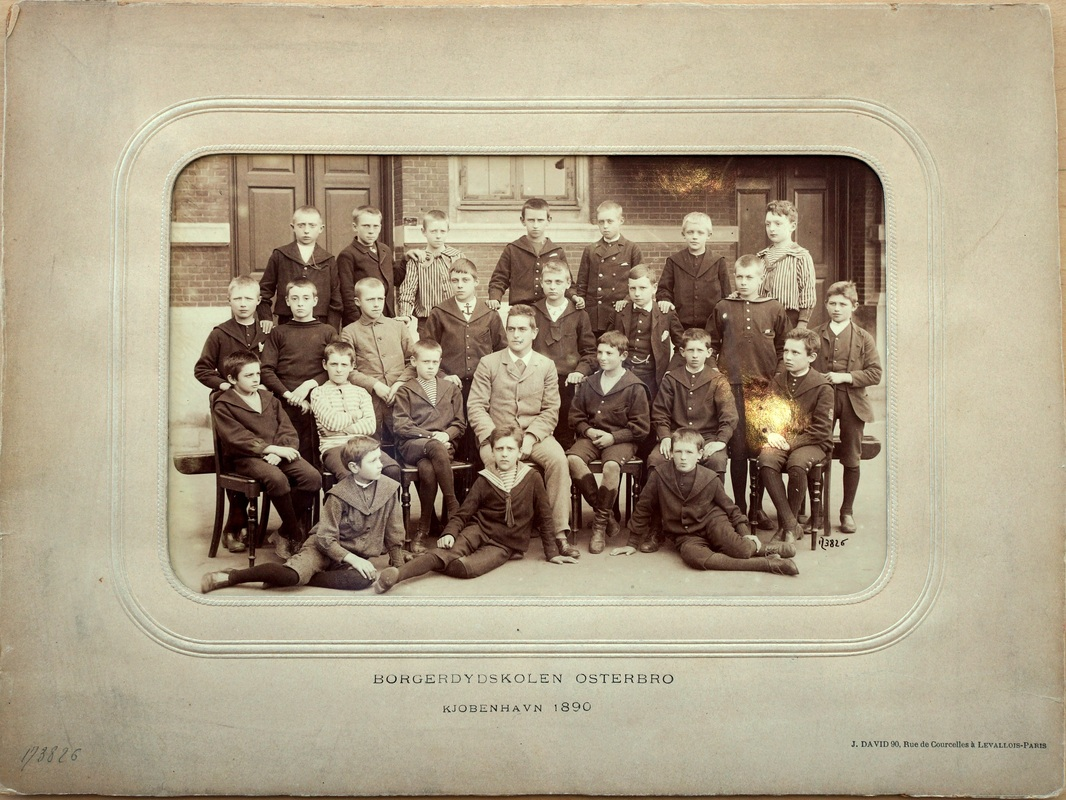
Borgerdydsskolen, Copenhagen-Østerbro (1890)

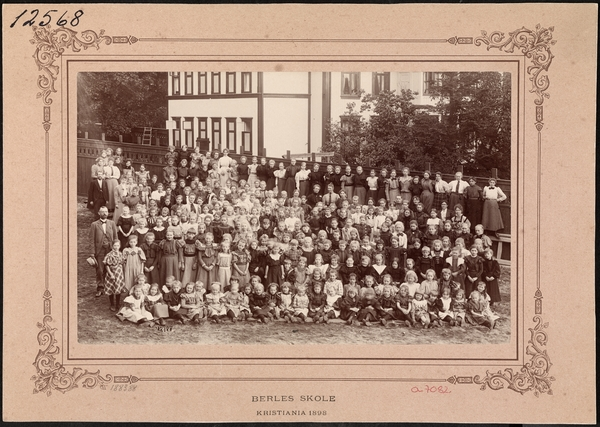
Berles skole, Oslo (1898)

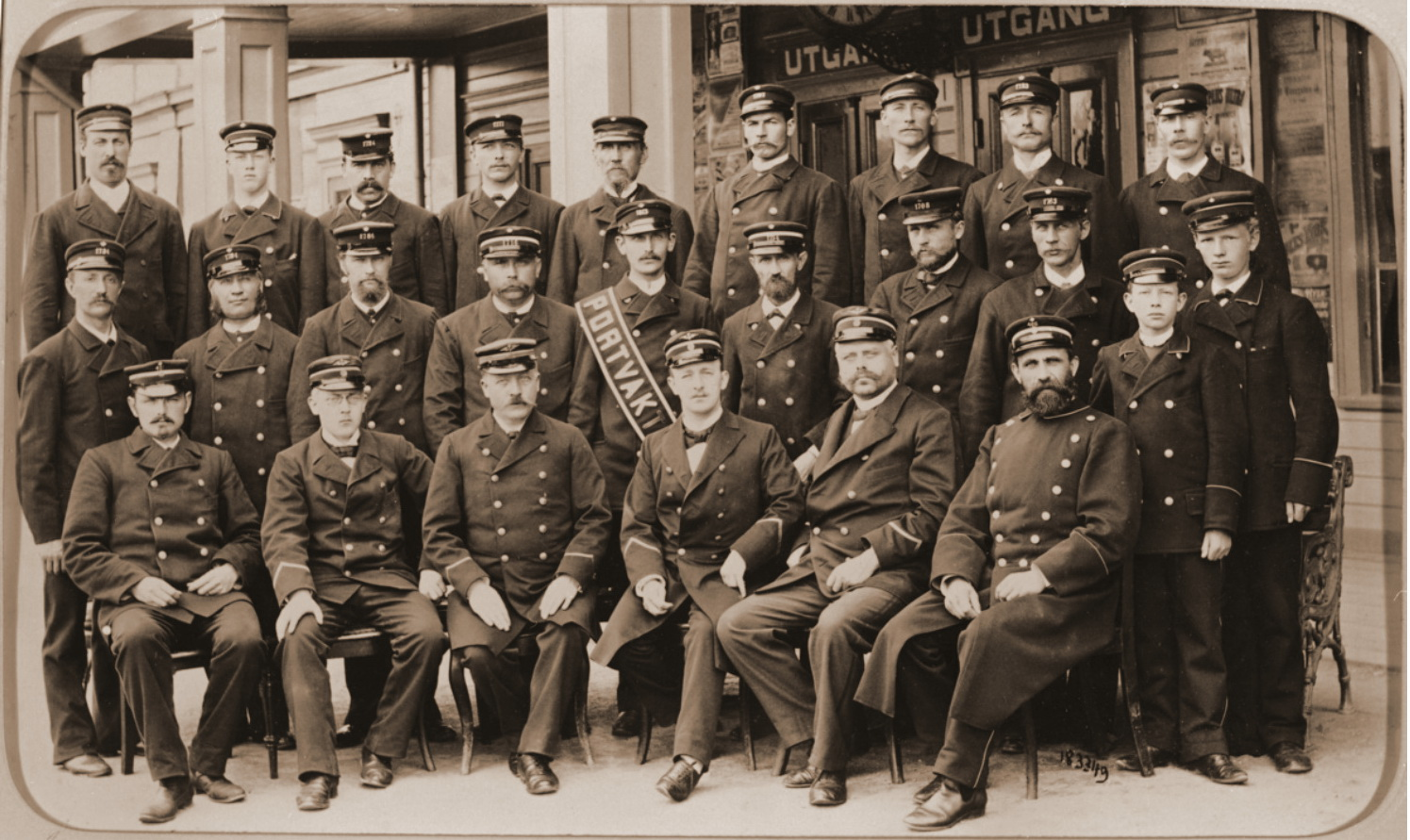
Railway employees in Sundsvall, Sweden (1892)

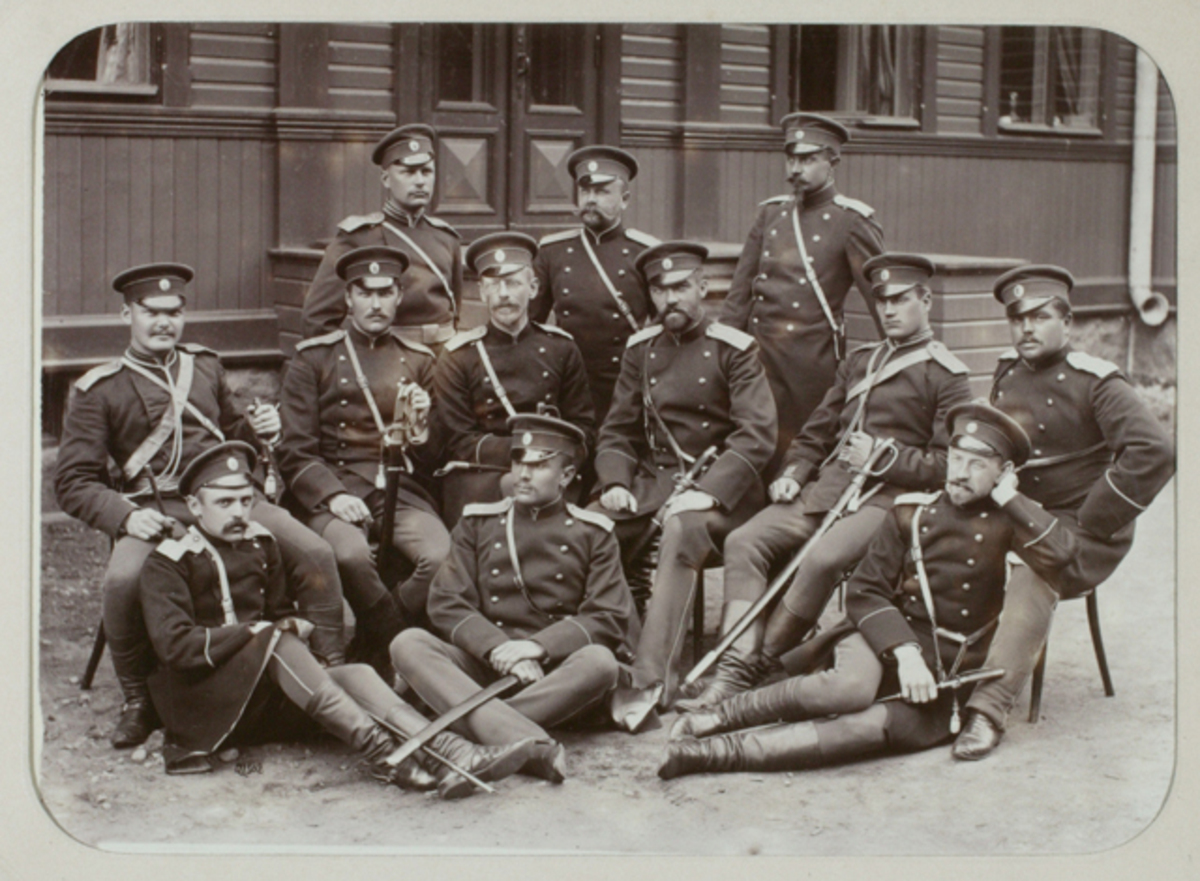
Officers of the Finnish Dragoon Regiment (before 1897)

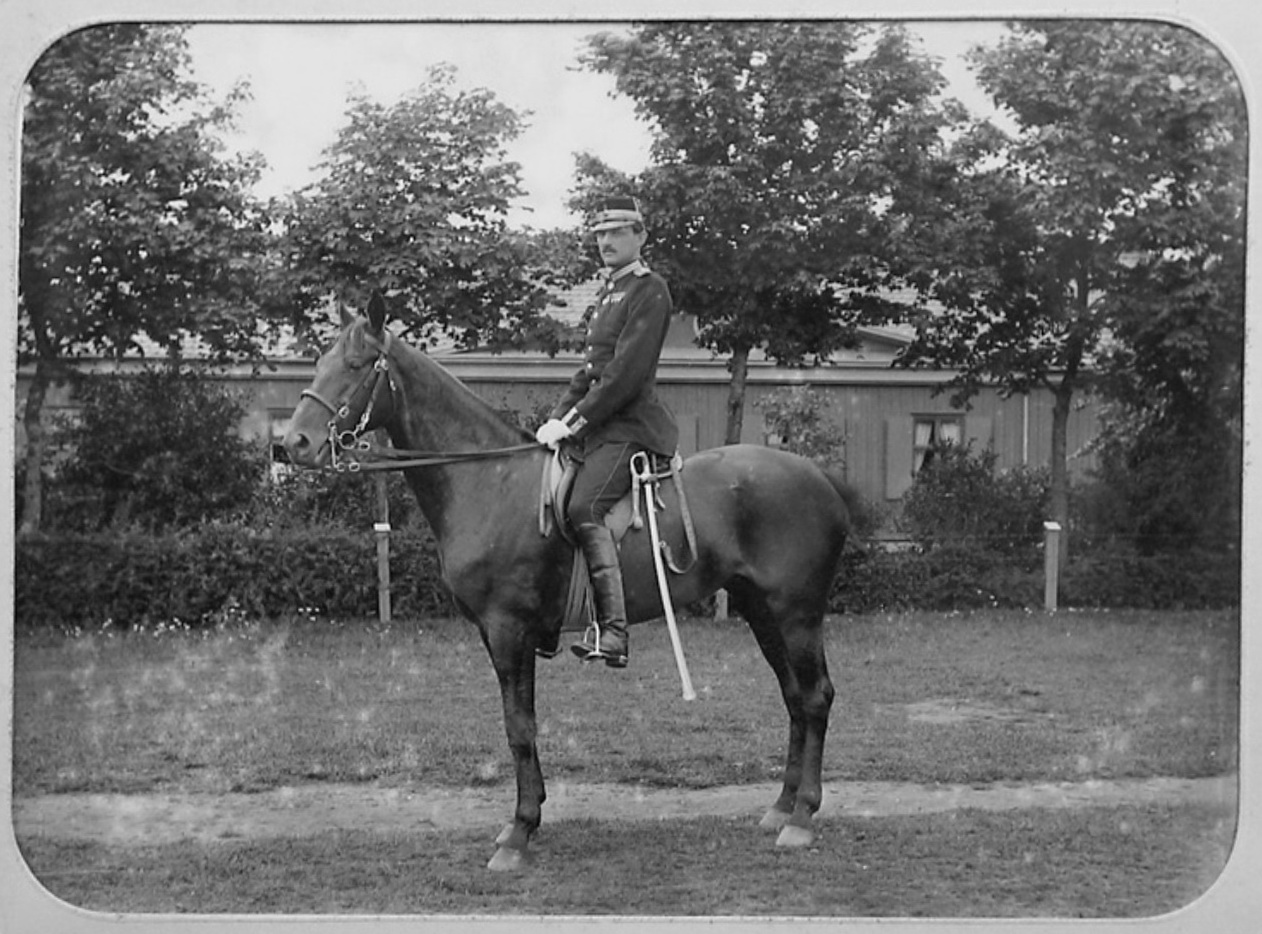
HRH Prince Carl, The Duke of Västergötland in Sweden (1894)

=== Southern Europe ===
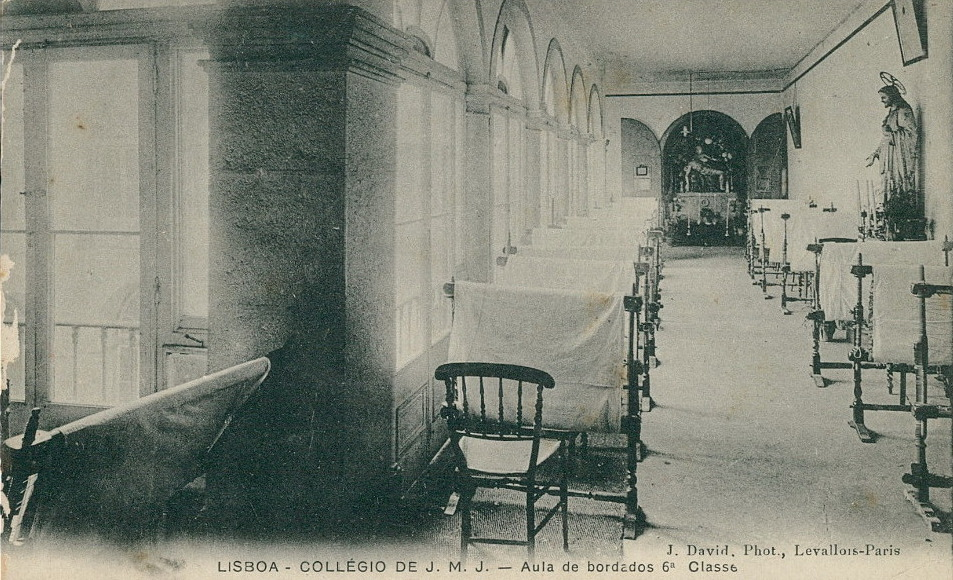
Colégio Jesus Maria José in Lisbon, embroidery room (before 1910)

In 1878 David received a prestigious commission from the Holy See. It resulted in Le Vatican 1878, another luxury album with twenty double-mounted photographs of the new pope Leo XIII, his closest associates, the Papal Swiss Guard and various locations in the Vatican. A copy of this album with a dedication was presented to emperor Alexander II of Russia. There is only one other photograph, taken in Turin in 1895/96, to testify of David's presence in Italy.

In Spain, on the contrary, numerous visits are recorded between 1878 and 1909, including some return visits to clients, as was the case with the railway company Ferrocarriles Andaluces in Málaga in 1895, 1903, 1907 and 1908. Other clients included Catholic (and Protestant) schools, technical schools, military and naval schools, factories and an observatory. Between 1881 and 1905 he visited Galicia at least seven times, where over ninety photographs are catalogued. In 1890 he worked in Gran Canaria.

David visited Portugal at least twice. In 1887/88 he took photographs at the University of Coimbra. A series of photographs of the Jesuit boarding school Colégio Jesus Maria José in Lisbon is undated but must have been taken prior to October 1910, when the school was closed down as a result of the Portuguese Revolution. Only one visit to Greece is recorded.

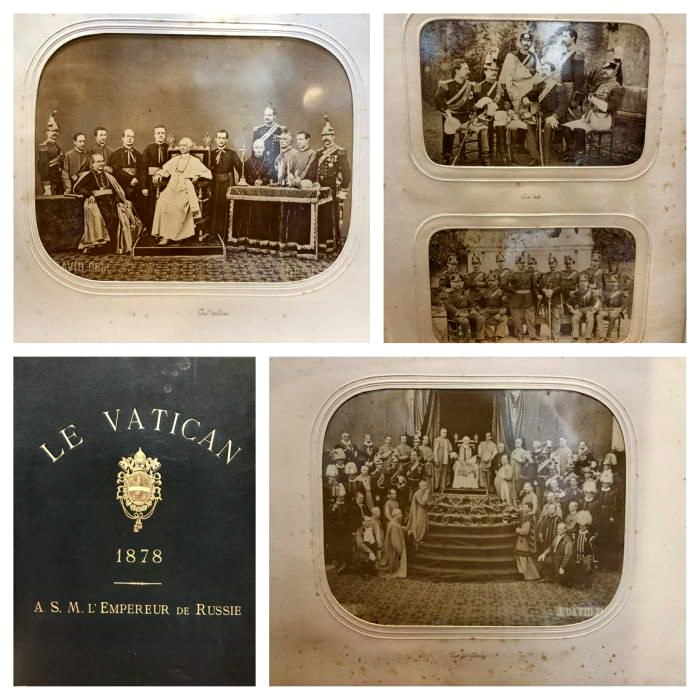
Photo album Le Vatican, Vatican City (1878)>>

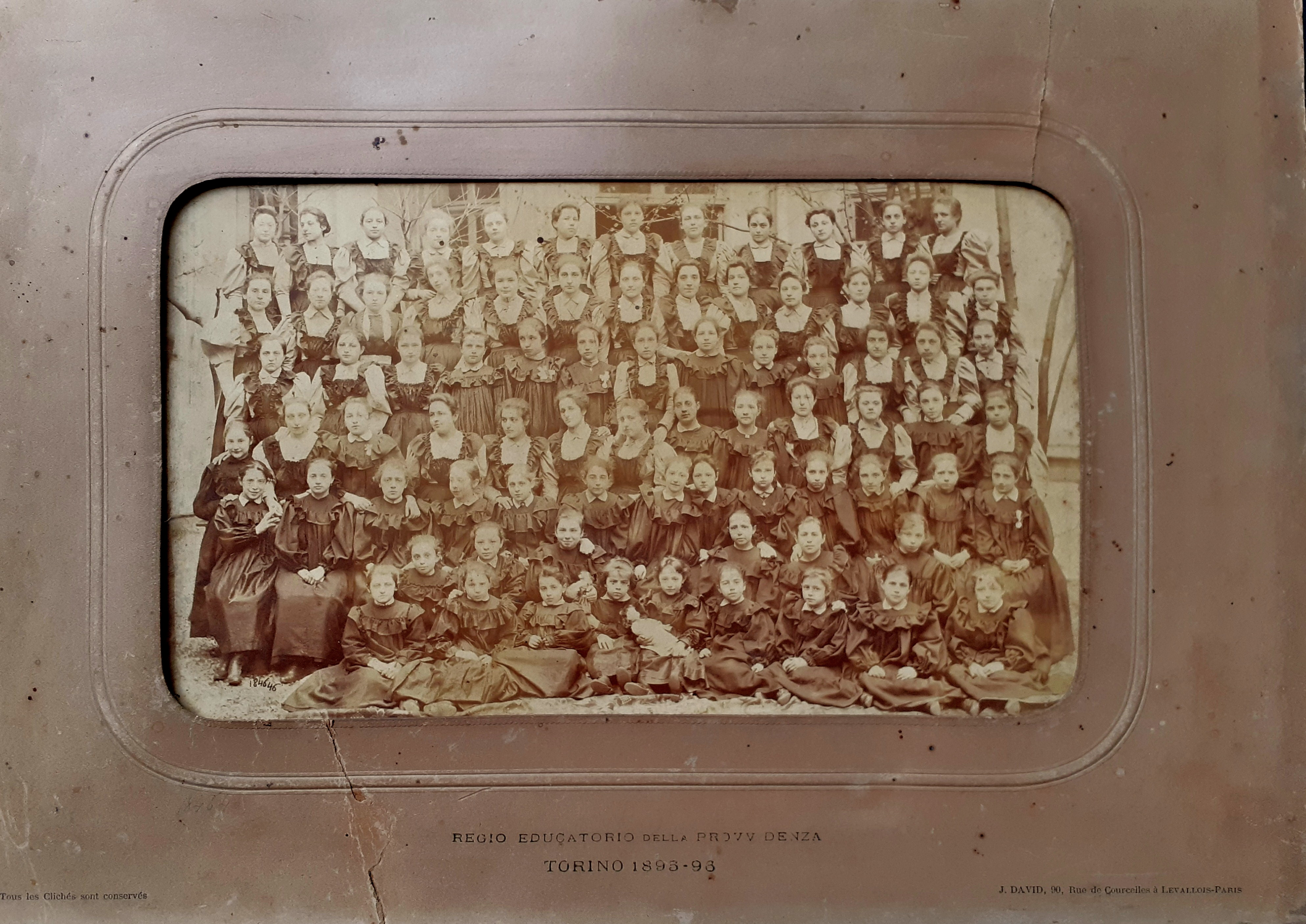
School photograph, Turin (1895/96)

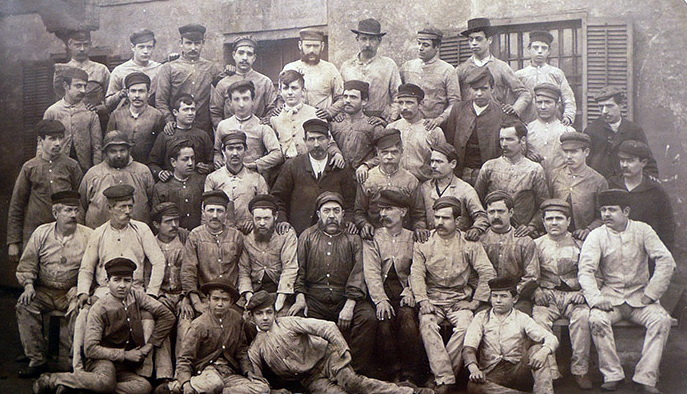
Steelworkers of Ferrería de Heredia, Málaga (1887)

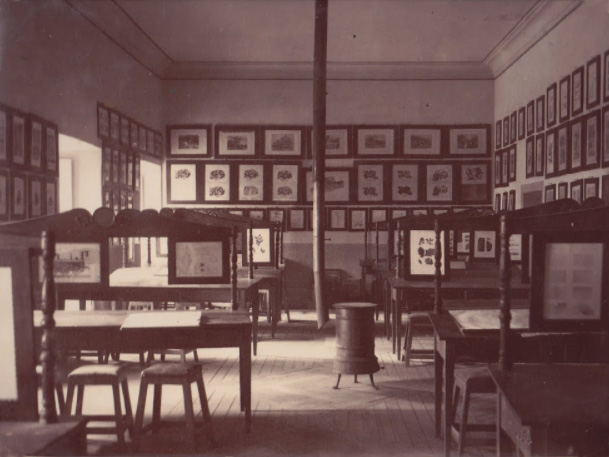
Library of Escuela de Ingenieros de Montes, El Escorial (1892)

=== Elsewhere ===
David's busy schedule took him to every corner of Europe, and beyond. In Central and Eastern Europe he visited institutions and private enterprises in Poland, Moravia, Austria, Croatia, Hungary and Russia. His furthest journey, as far as we know, took him to Brazil in 1906 where he spent several weeks taking photographs at the Colégio Militar in Rio de Janeiro, the Colégio Notre-Dame de Sion in Petrópolis, and the São Paulo Railway around São Paulo.

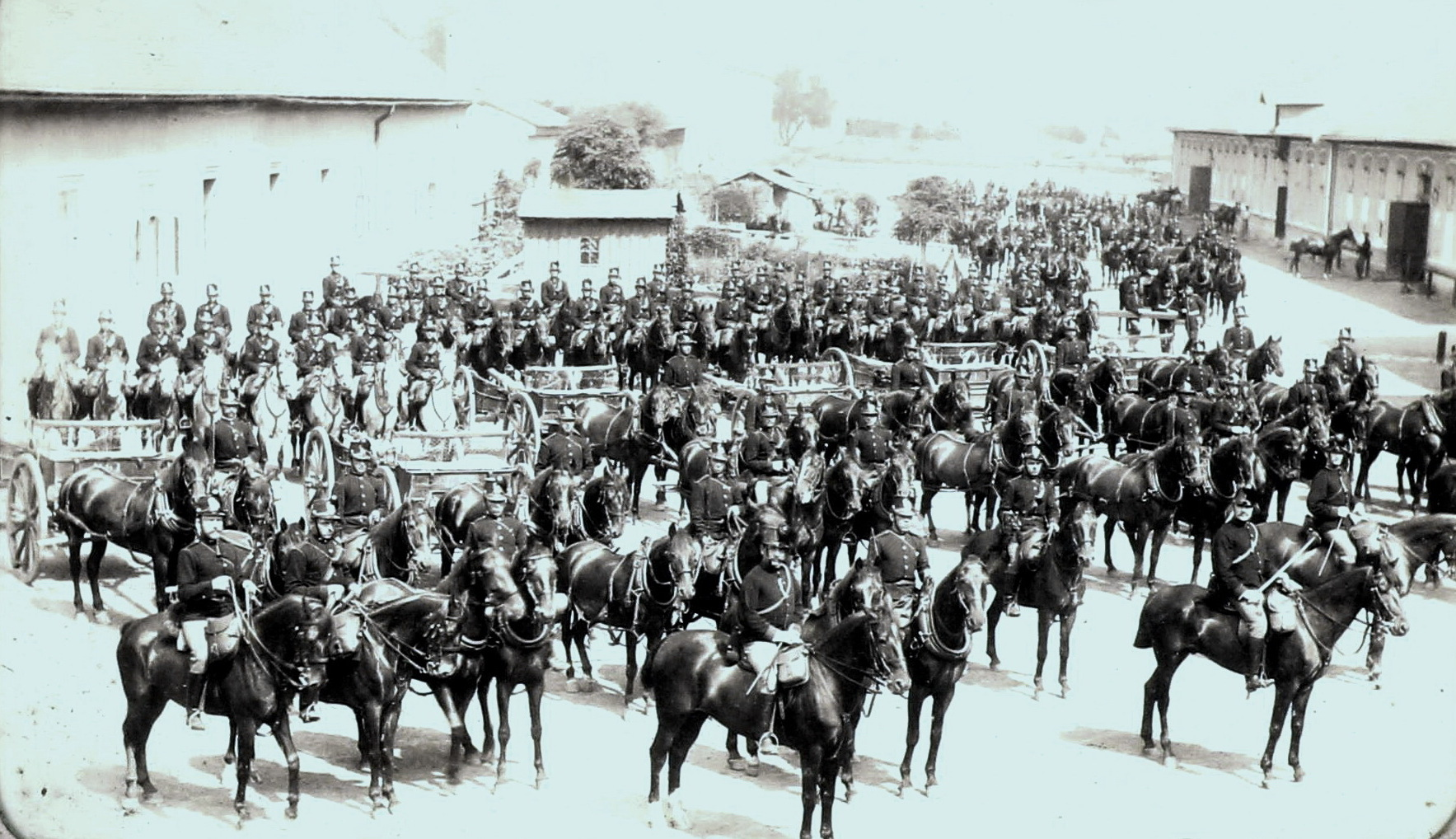
Austro-Hungarian artillery regiment in Brno, Moravia (1888)

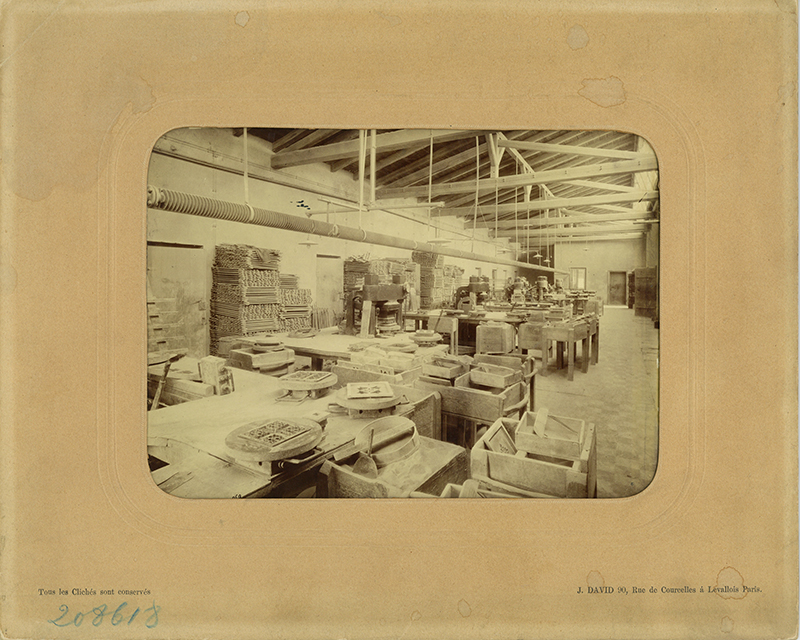
Ceramics factory "Marywil", Radom, Poland (1896-1902)

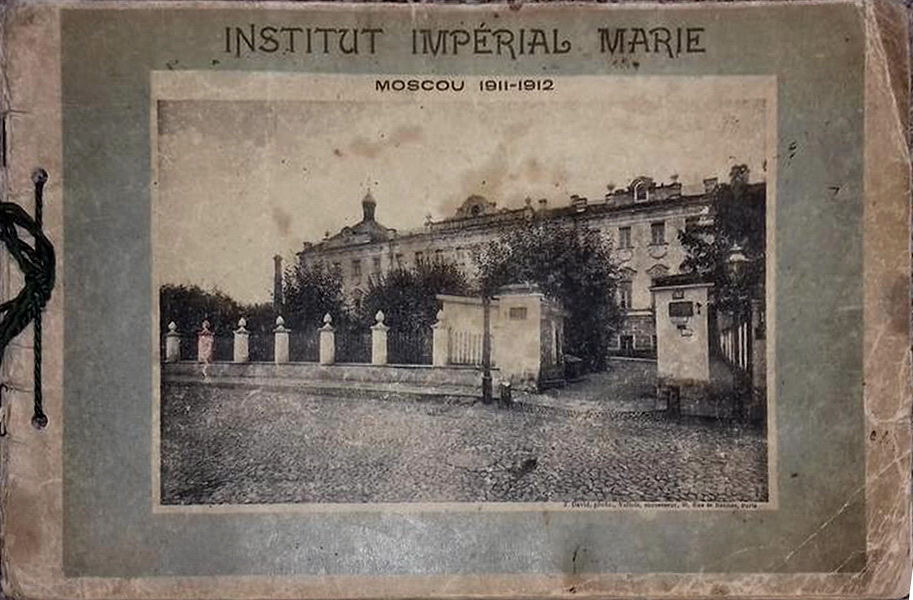
Booklet Institut Impérial Marie, Moscow (1912)

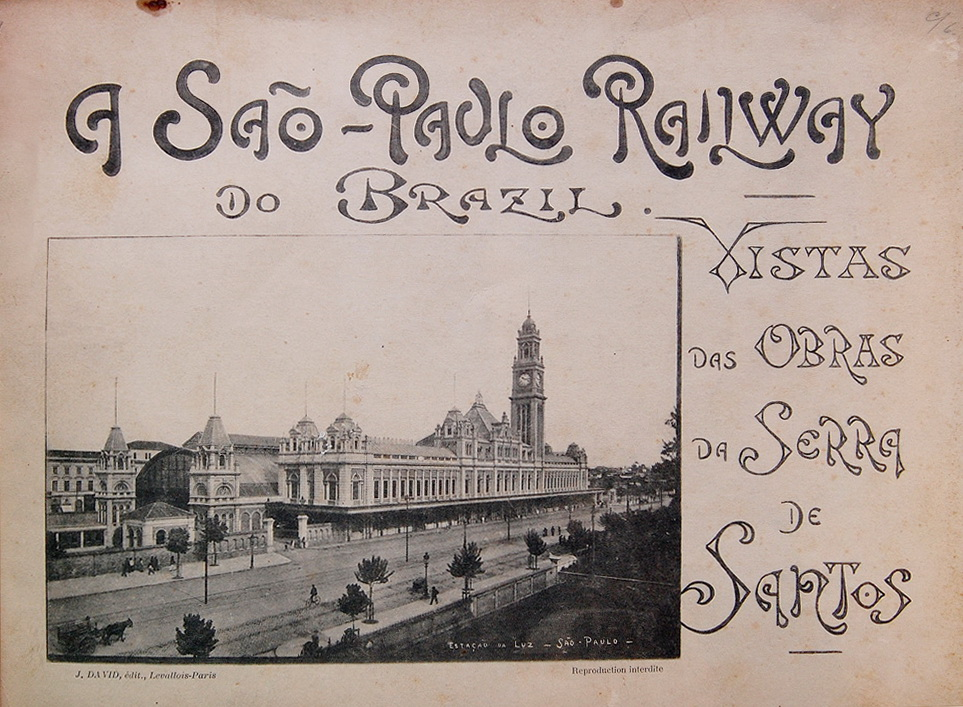
Booklet São Paulo Railway (1906)
