= Pinsot =

- Part of Le Haut-Bréda
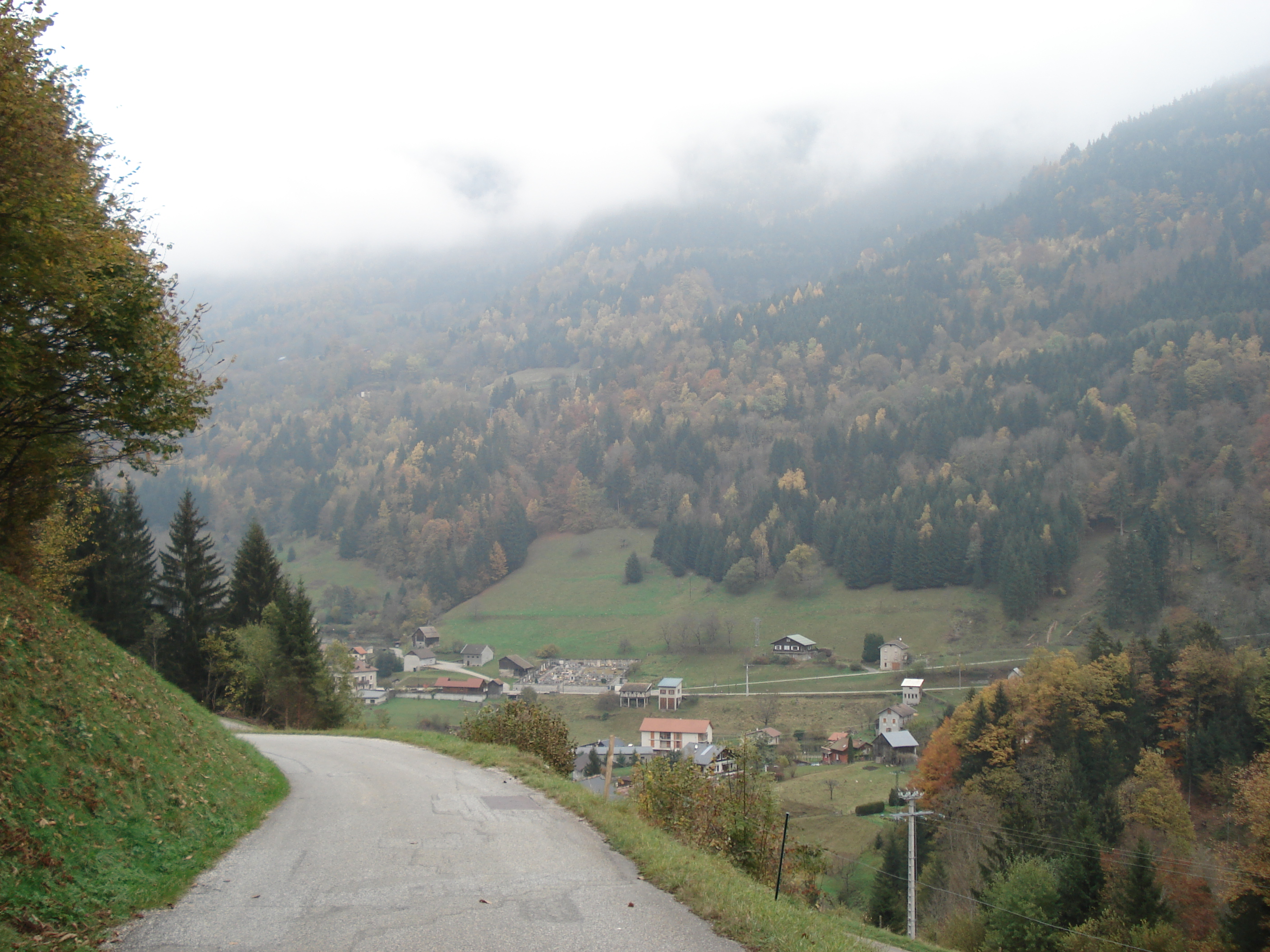
- A view of the village of Pinsot
- Location of Pinsot
- Location within France Location within Auvergne-Rhône-Alpes
- Coordinates: 45°21′28″N 6°06′03″E
- Country: France
- Region: Auvergne-Rhône-Alpes
- Department: Isère
- Arrondissement: Grenoble
- Canton: Le Haut-Grésivaudan
- Commune: Le Haut-Bréda
- Area^{1}: 24 km^{2} (9.3 sq mi)
- Highest elevation: 2,858 m (9,377 ft)
- Lowest elevation: 551 m (1,808 ft)
- Population (2023): 200
  - Density: 8.3/km^{2} (22/sq mi)
- Demonym: Pinsotins / Pinsotines
- Time zone: UTC+01:00 (CET)
  - Summer (DST): UTC+02:00 (CEST)
- Postal code: 38580
- ^{1} French Land Register data, which excludes lakes, ponds, glaciers > 1 km^{2} (0.386 sq mi or 247 acres) and river estuaries.

Pinsot (French pronunciation: [pɛ̃so]) is a former commune in the Isère department in southeastern France. On 1 January 2019, it was merged into the new commune Le Haut-Bréda.

== Sights ==
- The Iron Route of Pinsot (Le Sentier du Fer de Pinsot) is a forest trail leading visitors to discover the old mining industry of the town. Historic sites such as minors houses, disaffected mines and cinders can be seen.
- Le Cohard is a hamlet which is the starting point for many hiking trails into the Gleyzin mountain in the Belledonne massif.

== Born in Pinsot ==
- Jules David (1848-1923), photographer

== See also ==
- Communes of the Isère department
