= Le Haut-Bréda =

- Commune
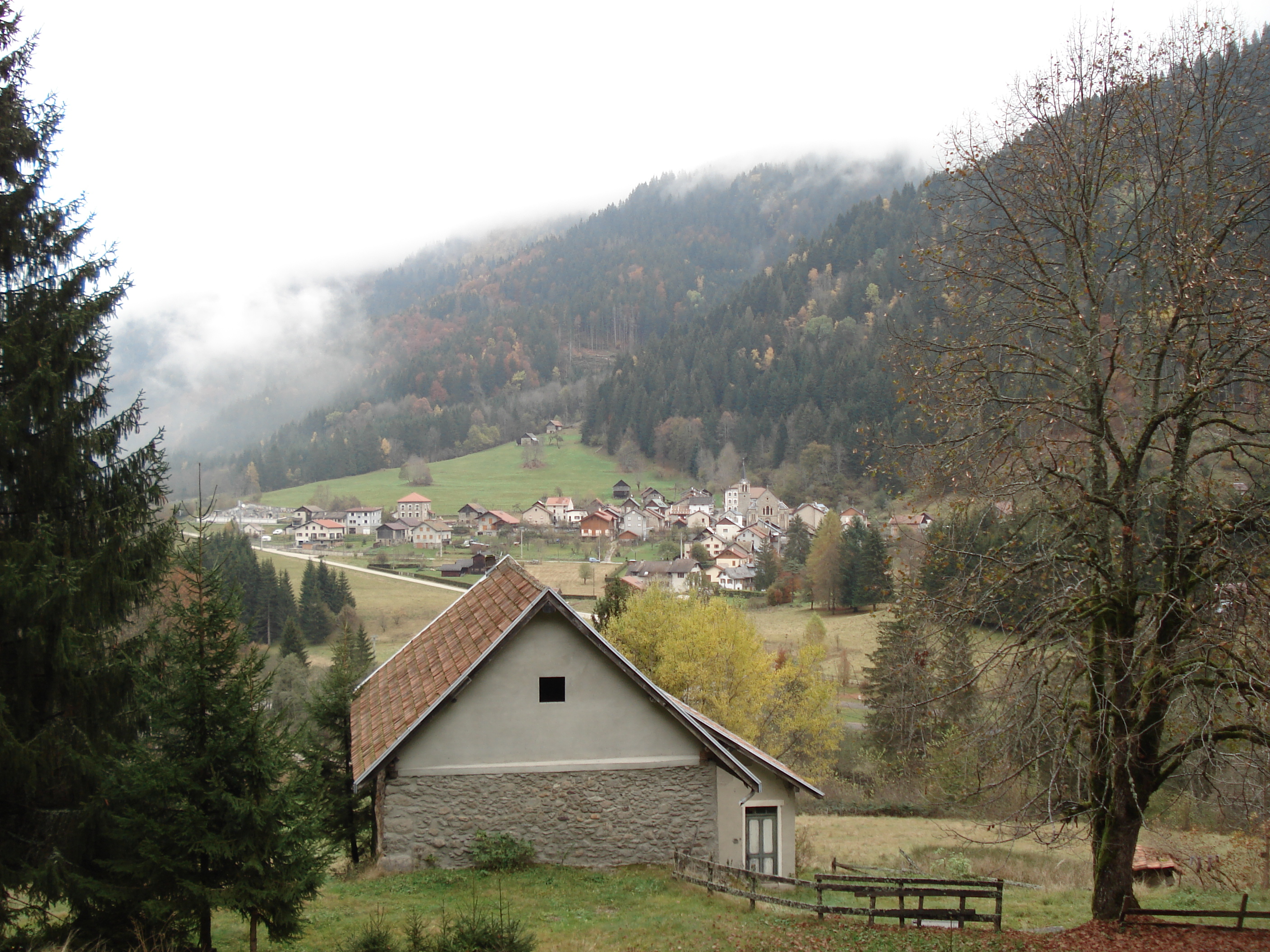
- A general view of La Ferrière
- Location of Le Haut-Bréda
- Location within France Location within Auvergne-Rhône-Alpes
- Coordinates: 45°19′14″N 6°05′16″E
- Country: France
- Region: Auvergne-Rhône-Alpes
- Department: Isère
- Arrondissement: Grenoble
- Canton: Le Haut-Grésivaudan
- Intercommunality: CC Le Grésivaudan

Government
  - Mayor (2020–2026): Sandrine Thilly
- Area^{1}: 78.60 km^{2} (30.35 sq mi)
- Highest elevation: 2,928 m (9,606 ft)
- Lowest elevation: 551 m (1,808 ft)
- Population (2023): 456
  - Density: 5.80/km^{2} (15.0/sq mi)
- Time zone: UTC+01:00 (CET)
  - Summer (DST): UTC+02:00 (CEST)
- INSEE/Postal code: 38163 /38580
- ^{1} French Land Register data, which excludes lakes, ponds, glaciers > 1 km^{2} (0.386 sq mi or 247 acres) and river estuaries.

Le Haut-Bréda (French pronunciation: [lə o bʁeda]) is a commune in the Isère department in southeastern France. It was established on 1 January 2019 by merger of the former communes of La Ferrière (the seat) and Pinsot.

== See also ==
- Communes of the Isère department
