= ENSAIT =

Textile industry and material engineering school

Coordinates: 50°41′40″N 3°10′05″E

- École nationale supérieure des arts et industries textiles
- Type: Public
- Established: 1889
- President: Eric DEVAUX
- Students: 500
- Location: Roubaix, France
- Website: http://www.ensait.fr

The École nationale supérieure des arts et industries textiles (ENSAIT) is a French Engineering grand établissement (grande école) and a member of UP-TEX research cluster (Union Pôle Textile).

ENSAIT is a higher education and research institute, gathering all the disciplines related to textiles. ENSAIT chairs include four departments related to education and research.

== Admission ==
- A majority of full-time students requesting admission have to pass a competitive exam (Concours e3a) in order to attend ENSAIT at the end of their undergraduate studies.
- International students with a bachelor's degree can also request for admission. About fifty percent of students at ENSAIT have an international profile.
- Professional part-time education is also developed.

== Textile curricula and research activities ==
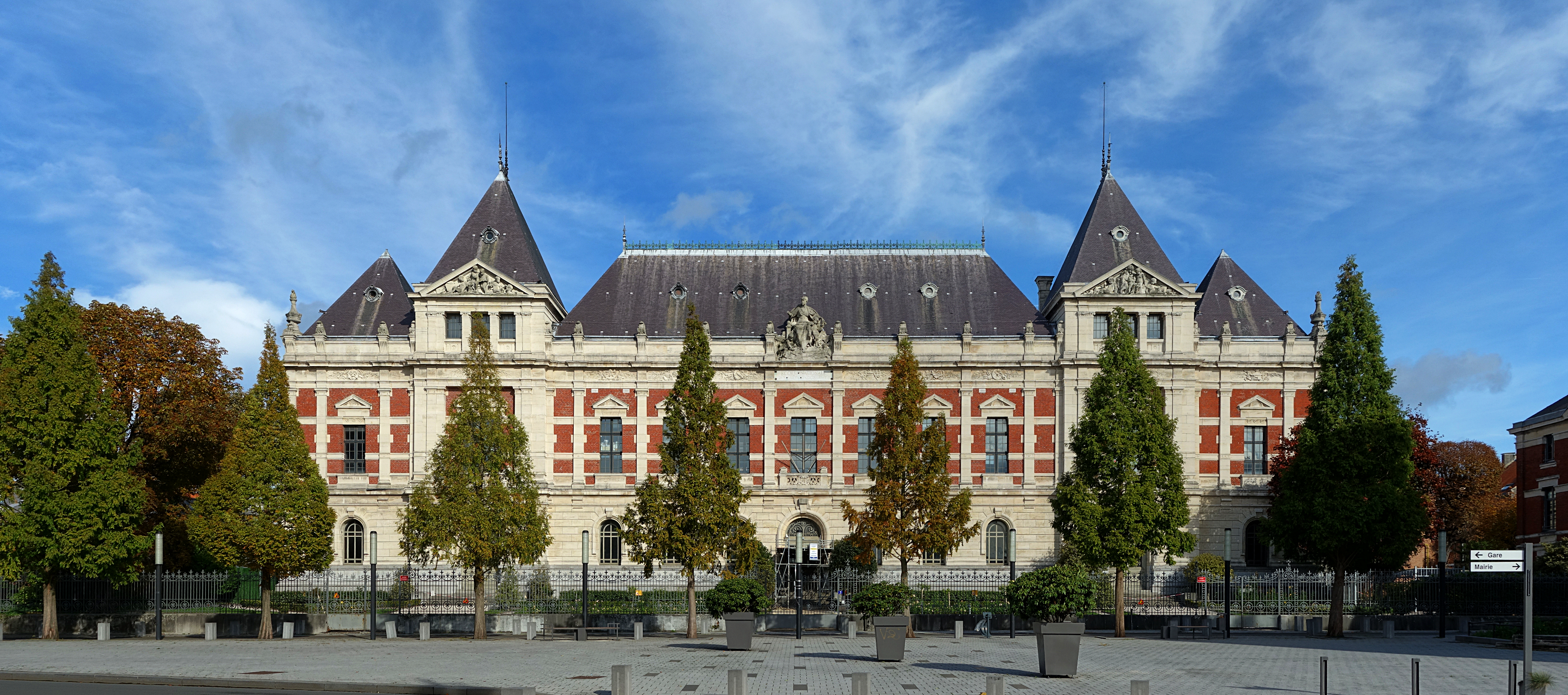
The ENSAIT, in Roubaix, France

ENSAIT different curricula lead to the following degrees :

- Ingénieur ENSAIT Master's degree
- Masters Research and Specialized Masters, in cooperation with the University of Lille, École centrale de Lille and École nationale supérieure de chimie de Lille.
- Doctoral degree

The major fields of study and research at ENSAIT are:

- Technical textiles, Mechanical engineering
- Industrial and manufacturing engineering
- Smart material
- Textiles Chemistry, Biotechnology in Textiles
- Clothing Technologies, Design

During first year at ENSAIT, students study all the basics of textile technology. Each year, approximately 80 students receive an ENSAIT Master's degree referred-to as diplôme d'ingénieur ENSAIT, and around 10 students receive a doctoral degree.

== History ==
The school was founded in Roubaix (Nord-Pas de Calais, France) with municipal funding. It was originally meant to provide a special studying program for the requirements of the textile industry at Roubaix and France. After 1889, the institution became known as the École d'Arts et Métiers Textiles. Because the school was near from the war front, it was closed in some wartime periods (World War I and World War II), many students and academic staff died in these wars.

Nowadays, the ENSAIT has a very large parc of machinery. In 1991, the GEMTEX was inaugurated as the first French center with research competence in all textile engineering fields. Entrepreneurship is also promoted with GENI-INNOTEX.

As of 2004, the institute, together with similar ones, was seen as a major contributor to research and development within the French textile and clothing industry.

The painter and lace designer Jean Chaleyé was director of the school from 1930 to 1939.

ENSAIT in Roubaix.

== Student life ==
Since the ENSAIT foundation, the students perpetuate their own traditions and folklore, and are members of a student society. They call themselves "AIT" . The "BDE" folklore includes traditional clothing, language, songs and legends, related symbolism, and ceremonials. BDE activities are independent of the administration of the school and are exclusively run by the students, although the two parts often cooperate for organising cultural or sporting events.

== Notable alumni ==
- Yasir Nawab – Vice-Chancellor of the University of Kamalia.

== International ==
The ENSAIT has a partnership with more than 300 institutions around the world.
