= Jean Chaleyé =

French painter and lace designer (1878–1960)

- Jean Chaleyé in the 1900s
- Born: Jean-Baptiste Chaleyé; 22 April 1878; Saint-Étienne, France
- Died: 24 February 1960 (aged 81); Le Puy-en-Velay, France
- Other name: Joannès Chaleyé
- Education: École des beaux-arts de Lyon; École nationale supérieure des arts décoratifs; École des beaux-arts (studio of Fernand Cormon)
- Known for: Painting (flower still lifes, landscapes); lace design
- Awards: Officier of the Legion of Honour (1937)

Jean Chaleyé (born Jean-Baptiste Chaleyé, 22 April 1878 – 24 February 1960), known as Joannès Chaleyé, was a French painter and lace designer. Trained in the flower-painting class of the École des beaux-arts de Lyon and in the studio of Fernand Cormon at the École des beaux-arts in Paris, he exhibited at the Salon des artistes français from 1902 and became known for his flower still lifes and for landscapes of the Velay. The Musée Crozatier in Le Puy-en-Velay holds a body of his paintings, of his lace cartoons and of lace made after his designs, several of them referenced in Joconde, the collections database of the French Ministry of Culture, and the French State's fine-arts administration, the Bureau des travaux d'art, opened files for the commission or purchase of his works in 1923 and in 1929. A retrospective of his work was held in 1978 at the Orangerie du Sénat, the orangery of the Jardin du Luxembourg in Paris.

Chaleyé also played a leading part in the twentieth-century revival of French handmade lace. Sent to Le Puy-en-Velay in 1903 to organise the artistic teaching of bobbin lace, he renewed its design repertoire, and lace made after his drawings won awards at international exhibitions, including a gold medal at the Franco-British Exhibition in London (1908) and a grand prix at the Brussels International Exposition (1910). He directed the École nationale supérieure des arts et industries textiles in Roubaix from 1930 to 1939 and founded the departmental conservatory of handmade lace in Le Puy-en-Velay in 1942. He was appointed a Chevalier of the Legion of Honour by decree of 7 May 1921, on the report of the Minister of Public Instruction, and promoted to Officier in 1937.

== Early life and training ==
Jean-Baptiste Chaleyé was born in Saint-Étienne on 22 April 1878. He first studied at the École régionale des arts industriels in Saint-Étienne (now the École supérieure d'art et design de Saint-Étienne), then, from 1896, at the École des beaux-arts de Lyon, where he joined the flower-painting class ("classe de fleurs") and graduated with a gold medal. A grant from the city of Lyon took him to Paris: he entered the École nationale supérieure des arts décoratifs in 1899, in the class of its director Auguste Louvrier de Lajolais, and was admitted in 1900 to the École des beaux-arts, in the studio of Fernand Cormon. According to the summary of his services in his Legion of Honour file, he won the second grand prix of the École nationale des arts décoratifs in 1903.

== Painting ==
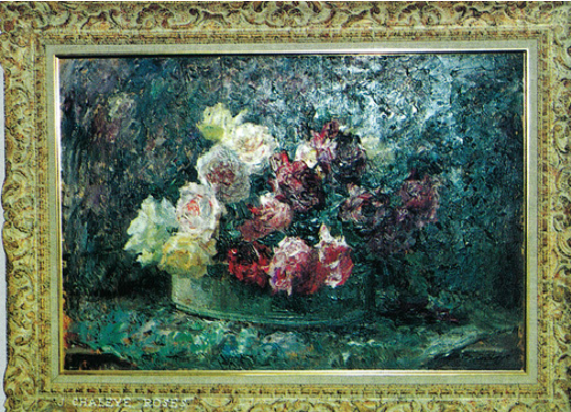
Painting by Jean Chaleyé exhibited at the Musée Crozatier, Le Puy-en-Velay

Alongside his career in lace, Chaleyé exhibited at the Salon des artistes français from 1902, in the architecture and decorative art section according to the summary of his services in his Legion of Honour file. Reviewing an exhibition in Aurillac in 1927, the Revue de la Haute-Auvergne singled out his Vue du Puy and found his flowers "charming". According to the summary of services that he attached to his Legion of Honour file in 1921, he won a third medal at the Salon of the Société lyonnaise des beaux-arts in 1919, then a second medal, in the painting section, in 1921. In June 1923 and in March 1929, the Bureau des travaux d'art opened two files for the commission or purchase of his works.

Several of his paintings and drawings in the Musée Crozatier are referenced in the Joconde database of the French Ministry of Culture. The museum's online collections include the still life Bouquet de renoncules (oil, inv. 1987.2.6) and Vue du Puy-en-Velay, prise de l'actuel hôpital Emile Roux (oil on canvas, inv. 1969.4.1). In the United States, his paintings have been handled by Findlay Galleries (formerly Wally Findlay Galleries), which lists him among its historic artists.

A retrospective, "Rétrospective Chaleyé 1878–1960", was held at the Orangerie du Sénat in Paris in June and July 1978. The contents of his studio were dispersed at auction at the Nouveau Drouot in Paris on 5 June 1987.

=== From drawing to lace ===
The online catalogue of the Musée Crozatier lists sixty-five inventory numbers under his name, thirty-one of them for the album Dentelles du Puy alone, inventoried plate by plate; seventeen of these are also referenced in the Joconde database. The holdings bring together paintings, lace cartoons by his hand and lace executed after his designs. The wash drawing Paysage (inv. 44.76.1), dated to around 1920, is described by Joconde as a lace cartoon whose corresponding lace is kept in the same museum. The cockfight motif, one of the three signed laces awarded a grand prix at the Brussels International Exposition of 1910, also appears in the collection in two forms: a signed oil on paper dated to around 1910 (inv. 2002.60), and a bobbin-lace pelmet of 1910 whose record names Louis Oudin as lacemaker and Chaleyé as designer (inv. 1934.20).

== Lace ==
In 1903, the year France organised professional training in handmade lace by law, Louvrier de Lajolais proposed that Chaleyé move to Le Puy-en-Velay to organise the artistic teaching of bobbin lace. At the local École pratique de commerce et d'industrie he created the course of art applied to lace, and he designed lace executed in the school or by the lacemaker Louis Oudin, replacing the traditional geometric repertoire with supple designs inspired by the local flora. His designs and the lace made after them won distinctions at the international exhibitions of the period, in Paris (musée Galliera, 1904), Liège (1905), London (1908, gold medal), Brussels (1910, grand prix and gold medal), Turin (1911, gold medal) and Lyon (1914).

From 1930 to 1939 he directed the École nationale supérieure des arts et industries textiles in Roubaix, and was artistic director of the lace school of Bailleul, retiring as honorary director. He was promoted to Officier of the Legion of Honour by decree of 6 August 1937, on the report of the Minister of National Education, in his capacity as director of the Roubaix school. His civil pension was approved by decree of 6 April 1939, with effect from 1 February 1939; the Journal officiel then credited him with thirty-three years, ten months and eleven days of civil service and bonuses. Back in Le Puy-en-Velay from 1940, he founded there in 1942, with the lacemaker Paul Fontanille, the departmental conservatory of handmade lace (conservatoire départemental de la dentelle à la main).

== Posthumous exhibitions ==
- Rétrospective Chaleyé 1878–1960, Orangerie du Sénat, Paris, June–July 1978
- Le Puy 1900 (group exhibition), Musée Crozatier, Le Puy-en-Velay, 19 July – 31 October 1980
- Les jardins et les fleurs de J.-B. Chaleyé, baptistery of Saint-Jean, Le Puy-en-Velay, May–August 1984
- Important paintings by the French post-impressionist J. Chaleyé, Wally Findlay Galleries, New York, 9 March – 1 April 1989
- Paintings for collectors: the flowers of Jean Chaleye (group exhibition), Wally Findlay Galleries, New York, 1992
- Jean-Baptiste Chaleyé : peintures et dentelles, Archives départementales de la Haute-Loire, Le Puy-en-Velay, 3 July – 31 August 2015

== Publications ==
Chaleyé published an album of lace designs and then, from 1945, a series of teaching books on the handmade lace of the Velay. His method was reissued and adapted long after his death.

- Dentelles du Puy : compositions de Joannès Chaleyé, trente planches, Paris, Calavas, Librairie des arts décoratifs, 1911; also published in Germany as Le Puy Spitzen. Kompositionen von Joannès Chaleyé, Plauen im Vogtland, C. F. Schulz & Co., 1910. Facsimile, Le Puy-en-Velay, Centre d'enseignement de la dentelle au fuseau, 2018 (BnF FRBNF45558435).
- L'Enseignement professionnel dentellier en Haute-Loire : historique et réalisations récentes, Le Puy, Imprimerie La Haute-Loire, 1945 (BnF FRBNF31924352).
- Méthode d'enseignement de la dentelle aux fuseaux, Clermont-Ferrand, P. Vallier, 1946 (BnF FRBNF31924353).
- La Dentelle à la main du Velay : sa valeur économique, ses perspectives d'avenir, preface by André Siegfried, Le Puy, Imprimerie La Haute-Loire, 1948 (BnF FRBNF31924351).
- La Dentelle à la main en Velay : son évolution historique, sa situation présente, Technique, Art, Science, 1949.

Posthumous reissues and adaptations:

- Principes, exercices, applications, modèles gradués, 2nd edition, Le Puy, Imprimerie des Arts graphiques, 1974 (BnF FRBNF34551337).
- Modèles revus et corrigés, méthode Chaleyé A, Le Puy, Centre d'enseignement de la dentelle au fuseau, 1989 (BnF FRBNF35361869).
- Mick Fouriscot, Dentelle au fuseau, méthode Jean Chaleyé : les bases, Paris, D. Carpentier, 1999, ISBN 2-84167-015-5 (BnF FRBNF37041295).

== Legacy ==
A square in the old town of Le Puy-en-Velay, the square Jean-Baptiste Chaleyé, is named after the artist. It sits at the corner of the Rue Jules Vallès and overlooks the Rue du Général Lafayette. The lace conservatory that Chaleyé founded stood on the same street.

== Bibliography ==
- Testard, Maurice (January–June 1913). "Joannès Chaleyé et la dentelle du Puy". L'Art décoratif (in French). 29: 51–60. doi:10.11588/diglit.69797.8. ISSN 1256-1134.
- Rey, Robert; Gauthier, Maximilien (1966). Jean Chaleyé, 1878–1960. Art-Documents (in French). Vol. 224. Geneva: Pierre Cailler.
- Rolland, Colette (1983). Jean B. Chaleyé (1878–1960) (in French). Paris: Éditions Errance. ISBN 9782903442088.
