= Julia Durzyńska =

Polish molecular biologist (born 1976)

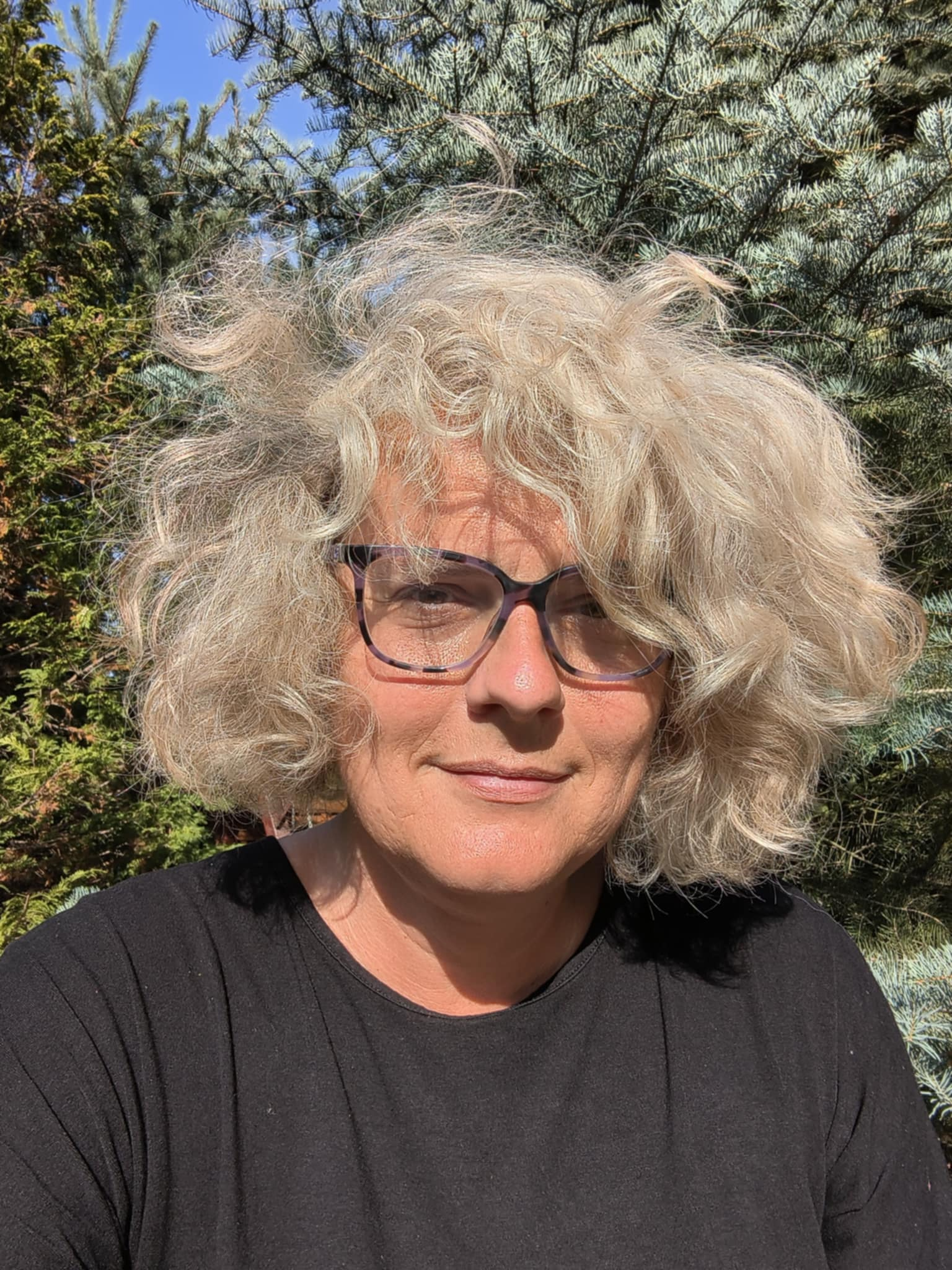
- Julia Durzyńska, 2025
- Born: 1976 (age 49–50); Poznań
- Citizenship: Polish
- Education: Adam Mickiewicz University in Poznań
- Occupation: molecular biologist

Julia Łucja Durzyńska (born 1976) is a Polish molecular biologist and virologist, professor at the Adam Mickiewicz University in Poznań.

== Biography ==
In 1995, she passed her matura examinations in Polish, English, and French at the St. Mary Magdalene High School in Poznań. During her studies, she spent a year in Paris as part of the Erasmus Programme.

In 2000, she completed her master's degree in molecular biology at Adam Mickiewicz University in Poznań. She completed her doctoral studies at the École doctorale chimie biologie at the University of Nantes, which, in conjunction with the Faculty of Biology at Adam Mickiewicz University, awarded her a doctorate in 2004 based on her dissertation entitled Analyse des interactions des récepteurs GPCR exprimés dans l'épithélium lingual humain avec les pseudo particules virales du VPH 11 (Analysis of interactions of GPCR receptors expressed in human lingual epithelial cells with virus-like particles of VPH 11). Her supervisors were Thomas Haertlé and Anna Goździcka-Józefiak.

Since 2005, she has worked at the Faculty of Biology at the Adam Mickiewicz University, initially as an assistant professor; she joined the Department of Genetics. She completed two postdoctoral fellowships in Philadelphia (University of Pennsylvania, 2011–2013) and Florida (University of Florida, 2016–2017), lasting a total of three years. During this period, her mentor was Elisabeth Barton. She obtained her habilitation in 2015 based on her thesis entitled Wpływ insulinopodobnego czynnika wzrostu (IGF-1) na przebieg zakażeń wirusem brodawczaka u człowieka (The influence of insulin-like growth factor (IGF-1) on the course of human papillomavirus infections). In 2019, she assumed the position of professor at the Adam Mickiewicz University. She made research on cancer cell biology in the context of various growth factor isoforms and is interested in epigenetic regulation in cancer cells.

She is a transgender woman. In 2024, Novae Res published her debut novel, Gdy słońce wypieka sny, an autofictional novel about a transgender scientist.
