= Alfred Boiffin =

French professor of clinical surgery

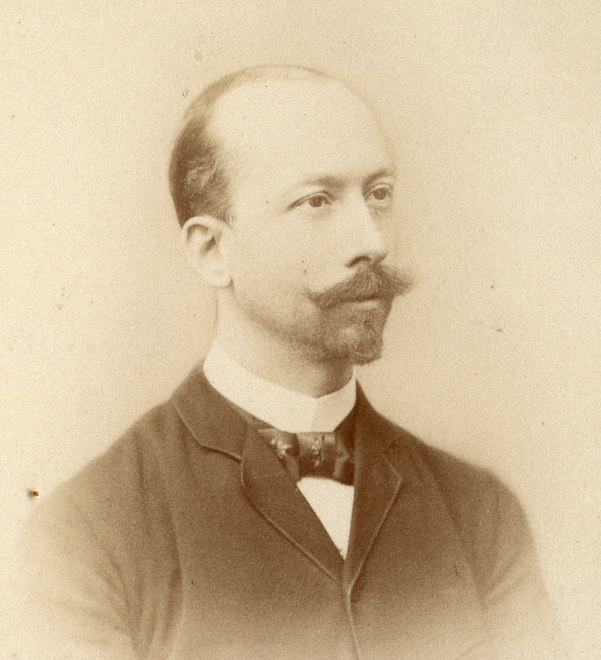
- Photo of the doctor, date unknown.
- Born: 2 June 1856; Nantes
- Died: 1896
- Medical career
- Profession: Professor of clinical surgery
- Institutions: University of Nantes

Alfred Boiffin was a French professor of clinical surgery at the University of Nantes in the 19th century. He died suddenly at age 39.

Born of "a noble Breton family" in Nantes on 2 June 1856, Boiffin studied medicine at the University of Nantes, graduating in 1878. By 1880, he was a surgical clinic assistant at the university. He published several papers and presented many respected lectures at the Nantes Anatomical Society. Also spending time as an intern at the Nantes and Paris hospitals, he became an aide in the Anatomical Department in 1883 and later in 1886, he was a prosector at the ‘’Faculté de médicine de Paris’’. He also served as deputy chief of the surgical clinic under Professor Trélat in 1887. By the time of his death in 1896 he was a professor of clinical surgery at the University of Nantes. He was also corresponding member of the Paris Surgical Society.

An extensive memorial was published in the Archives provinciales de chirurgie in 1896, where he was fondly remembered by numerous colleagues and professionals from Belgium and France. His funeral took place at Nantes; the article notes that several wreaths were placed on his coffin, including some from the local Student Association, one from the faculty of medicine and another from the student body of the University of Nantes, one from the Intern Society of the local hospital, one from the local Doctors Union and one from the staff of the Archives journal.
