= Musée Crozatier =

Coordinates: 45°02′19″N 3°52′59″E

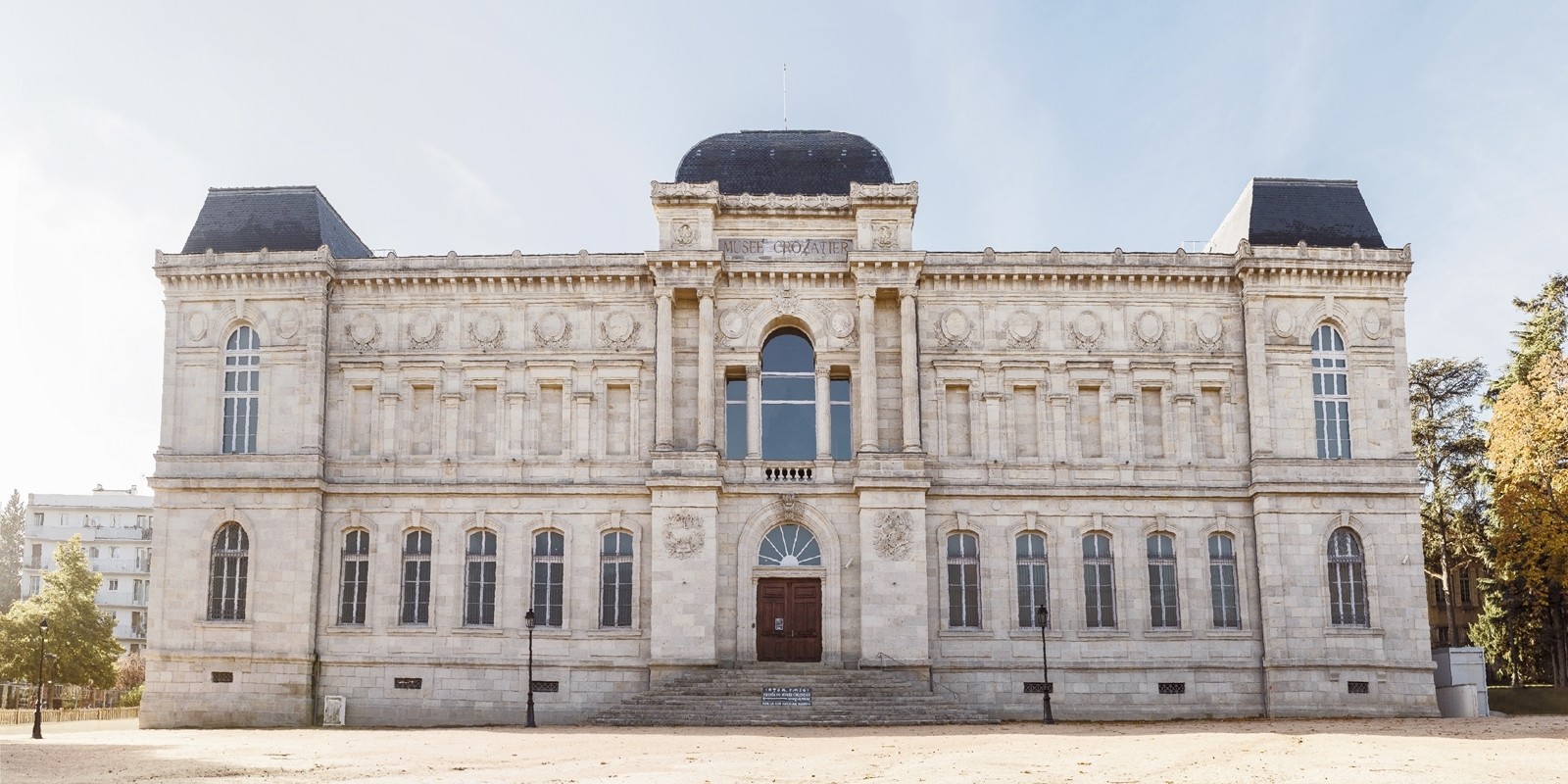
- Façade of the Musée Crozatier
- Established: 1868
- Location: Puy-en-Velay, Auvergne, France
- Type: Archaeological museum, Art museum
- Visitors: 19,101 (2007)

The Musée Crozatier is a museum in Le Puy-en-Velay in the French Auvergne. Inaugurated in 1868, its collection comprises art and archaeological artifacts from Velay and the Haute-Loire region. The museum has undergone a major renovation from 2010 to 2018 (re opening in July 2018).

== Collection ==
The diversity of the museum's collections (painting, sculpture, graphic arts, works of art, archaeology, natural history, mechanics, crafts, lace) allows a discovery of the history of Velay and an overview of art and sciences, through 4 galleries: historical, fine arts, scientific and local crafts.

The collection also includes paintings, drawings and lace by the painter and lace designer Jean Chaleyé, several of which are referenced in the Joconde database of the French Ministry of Culture.

== See also ==
- List of museums in France
