= Jean-Marc Coicaud =

French and American theorist

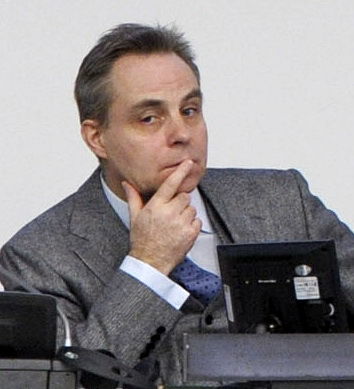
Jean-Marc Coicaud in 2010

Jean-Marc Coicaud is a French and American legal and political theorist focusing on global issues, among numerous other topics. He is Professor of Law and Global Affairs at Rutgers University and a Global Ethics Fellow at the Carnegie Council for Ethics in International Affairs. He is an elected member of the Academia Europaea (the European Academy of Arts and Sciences). Over the years, he has lived and worked in Europe, the Americas (the United States and Latin America), and Asia (Japan, China, and Taiwan). His professional trajectory has combined serving as a policy practitioner at the national, regional, and global levels, and as a scholar and professor in academia.

== Early life and education ==
Born in Les Herbiers, Vendée, Jean-Marc Coicaud studied philosophy, literature, law/political science and linguistics. He attended University of Nantes and then moved to Paris where he studied at Université Paris 1 Panthéon-Sorbonne, Institut d'Etudes Politiques de Paris (Sciences Po), and Université Paris VII. Later on he studied in the United States at Harvard University. He earned a doctorate in Political Science/Law at the Sorbonne and a Doctorat d'Etat in Legal and Political Theory from Sciences Po.

Coicaud holds a PhD in Political Science-Law from the University of Paris 1 Panthéon-Sorbonne and a Doctorat d'Etat in Legal and Political Theory from the Institut d'Etudes Politiques of Paris. He also holds undergraduate and graduate degrees in Philosophy, Literature and Linguistics.

== Career ==
Following his first doctorate, Coicaud worked for the Scientific and Cultural Services of the French Consulate in Houston, Texas. He then returned to France and worked as a legislative assistant for a Parliament Member of the European Parliament. At the same time he taught constitutional law to first-year students at the Sorbonne. With the support of an Arthur Sachs Fellowship and a Ministry of Foreign Affairs Fellowship, he spent six years at Harvard University working on his doctorat d'Etat. At Harvard, Coicaud was affiliated with the Center for European Studies, the Center for International Affairs, the Department of Philosophy, and the Law School. This led to his second doctorat d'Etat, granted by Sciences Po, on the issue of political legitimacy and responsibility, with his dissertation eventually being published in a variety of languages.

Following the end of his studies, Coicaud received a position with the Executive Office of the United Nations Secretary-General, Dr. Boutros-Ghali, as a member of his speech-writing team, at the United Nations Headquarters in New York. He then served as a Senior Academic Officer and Research Director with the United Nations University (a think-tank for the United Nations) in Tokyo, Japan. He then returned to the United States to head the United Nations University Office at UN headquarters in New York.

Coicaud has been a visiting professor at the Ecole Normale Supérieure-Ulm in Paris and has taught at The New School for Social Research (New York). In addition, he has been a senior fellow at the United States Institute of Peace (Washington, D.C.), a Global Research Fellow at New York University School of Law, a visiting scholar at the School of Public Policy and Management of Tsinghua University (Beijing), and a visiting scholar at the Institutum Iurisprudentiae at Academia Sinica (Taipei).

Since 2011 Coicaud has held the position of Professor of Law at Rutgers University Law School with a joint appointment as Professor of Global Affairs at the Division of Global Affairs where he formerly served as director of the program.

He serves on the advisory board of Global Policy Journal (London) and is a member of the Carnegie Council Advisory Board of Global Policy Innovations (New York).

== Publications ==
Jean-Marc Coicaud has published 15 books (single-authored, co-authored and co-edited), and around 90 book chapters and articles in the fields of comparative politics, political and legal theory, international relations and international law. His books are available in English, French, Japanese, Chinese, Spanish and Arabic, and include the following:

- Emotions and Passions in International Politics: Beyond Mainstream International Relations (Cambridge University Press, 2016) (Co-Edited/Authored)
- Fault Lines of International Legitimacy (Cambridge University Press, 2009). (Co-Edited/Authored)
- Mai Xiang Guo Ji Fa Zhi (Towards the International Rule of Law; Sanlian Shudian, 2008)
- Kokuren no Genkai/Kokuren no Mirai (Future of the UN/Limits of the UN, 2007)
- Beyond the National Interest: The Future of UN Peacekeeping and Multilateralism in an Era of U.S. Primacy (United States Institute of Peace Press, 2007)
- Ethics in Action: The Ethical Challenges of International Human Rights Non-Governmental Organizations(Cambridge University Press, 2006) (Co-Edited/Authored)
- Legitimacy and Politics: A Contribution to the Study of Political Right and Political Responsibility (Cambridge University Press, 2002)
- Légitimité et Politique (Presses Universitaires de France, 1997)
- L'introuvable Démocratie Autoritaire L'Harmattan, 1996)
