= Azzedine Bousseksou =

Franco-Algerian physico-chemist (born 1964)

- Born: December 2, 1964 (age 61); Kouba, Algiers, Algeria
- Citizenship: Algeria; France
- Education: Pierre and Marie Curie University (PhD) (until 1992) University of Toulouse (Habilitation) Houari Boumediene University of Science and Technology (Postgraduate Diploma) University of Nantes
- Occupations: Physical chemist, university professor, researcher
- Employer: University of Toulouse French National Centre for Scientific Research
- Organization(s): French Academy of Sciences (2013) Algerian Academy of Sciences and Technologies (2015)

Azzedine Bousseksou (born December 2, 1964) is a French-Algerian physical chemist who researches molecular materials and spintronics. He has worked on molecular materials for potential applications in memory storage, sensors, and optoelectronic devices. He has published work on spintronics phenomena, molecular electronics, and nanotechnology.

== Education ==
Bousseksou obtained a diploma in Materials Physics from Université de Bab Ezzouar (Algiers) in 1983, a Diplôme d'études approfondies (DEA) in Materials Science from the University of Nantes in 1988, and a PhD in Materials Science from Pierre and Marie Curie University (Paris) in 1992. His doctoral research was awarded at the Inorganic Chemistry Laboratory of Johannes Gutenberg University Mainz.

== Memberships ==
Bousseksou was a founding member of the Algerian Academy of Sciences and Technologies (2015). He is also a member of the French Academy of Sciences (elected 2013), the European Academy of Sciences and Arts (elected 2012), and the European Academy of Sciences (elected in 2014).
