= Annie Brisset =

Canadian linguist

Annie Brisset, a member of the Royal Society of Canada, is a Professor of Translation Studies and Discourse Theory at the School of Translation and Interpretation of the University of Ottawa, Canada.

== Career ==
Brisset received a Licence d'anglais from the Université de Nantes (France), an MA in Applied Linguistics (Translation) from the University of Ottawa, and a PhD in Semiotics & Literary Studies from the Université du Québec à Montréal (UQAM). Her areas of research include Translation theories, Discourse theories, Sociology and Sociocritique of translation, and Interpretation. She is a member of the Advisory board of The Translator a refereed international journal that publishes articles on a variety of issues on translation and interpreting as acts of intercultural communication, and a member of the international advisory board of TTR (Translation, Terminology and Writing), a scholarly biannual journal of the Canadian Association for Translation Studies, which publishes articles on Translation, Terminology, Writing and related disciplines.

From 1980-1983, she was the founding Director of the School of Translation, Collège St. Boniface of the University of Manitoba, and then she went on to become Director of the School of Translation and Interpretation of the University of Ottawa from 1989-1992. Professor Brisset's career started at the Translation Bureau (Public Works and Government Services Canada), where she held successive positions, ranging from translator, reviser, interpreter, Head of the Translation and Interpretation services (House of Commons committees of the Canadian Parliament), and Coordinator of the Interpreter Training Centre, University of Ottawa.

She is a UNESCO consultant for the development of multilingual communication for Central and Eastern Europe, and former President and founding member of IATIS (International Association for Translation and Intercultural Studies.

In 2007 she served as a member of jury for the Governor General of Canada's Literary Awards.

In 2009 she was elected fellow of the Royal Society of Canada for her exceptional achievements in the areas of sciences and arts & humanities in 1991, she received the Ann Saddlemyer Award(Canadian Association for the History of Theatre), while in 1987, she received the Jean-Béraud Theatre Critic of the Year Award (Canadian and Quebec associations of theatre critics.

== Publications ==
Brisset has published extensively, and edited several academic articles and reviews in the area of translation studies. Some of her publications are:

- A Sociocritique of Translation. Theatre and Alterity in Quebec;
- Poésie, cognition, traduction;
- « Traduire le texte dans son projet. Le littéralisme est soluble dans la poésie moderne : Auden », in A. Brisset (éd.), TTR;
- « Clémence Royer, ou Darwin en colère », in J. Delisle (ed.), Portraits de traductrices, Presses de l'U d'Ottawa, 2002, 173-203
- "Alterity in Translation : An Overview of Theories and Practices", in S. Petrilli (ed.);
- « Retraduire ou le corps changeant de la connaissance. Sur l'historicité de la traduction », Palimpsestes. Faut-il retraduire?;
- "Translation and Identity", in L. Venuti (ed.), The Translation Studies Reader, Londres/New York, Routledge, 2004 [2000]
- « Le traducteur sujet du sens : conflit de représentations », in M. Lederer (éd »), Le sens en traduction, Paris, Minard, 2006, 21-35
- « La notion de culture dans les manuels de traduction. Domaines allemand, anglais, coréen et français ». Meta;
- Traduire la « création pure ». Altazor de Huidobro et la (dé)raison transformationniste, Palimpsestes. Hommage à Paul Bensimon, no hors série,
- "Translation, theatre and society: Quebec's American dream",
