= Guillaume Coelho =

French professional football player (born 1986)

Personal information
- Date of birth: March 19, 1986 (age 40)
- Place of birth: Le Puy-en-Velay, France
- Height: 1.74 m (5 ft 8 1/2 in)
- Position: Defender

Team information
- Current team: US Orléans

Senior career*
Years	Team	Apps	(Gls)
2004–2006	LB Châteauroux	3	(0)
2006–2007	LB Châteauroux B		
2007–2009	Croix-de-Savoie		
2009–2013	US Orléans		
2013–	Le Puy	76	(0)
- * Club domestic league appearances and goals as of 10:26, 10 February 2018 (UTC)

Guillaume Coelho (born March 19, 1986) is a French professional football player. Currently, he plays in the Championnat National 1 for Le Puy Foot 43 Auvergne.

He played at the professional level in Ligue 2 for LB Châteauroux.

== See also ==
- Football in France
- List of football clubs in France
