= Pierre Roux-Dorlut =

French architect and urbanist

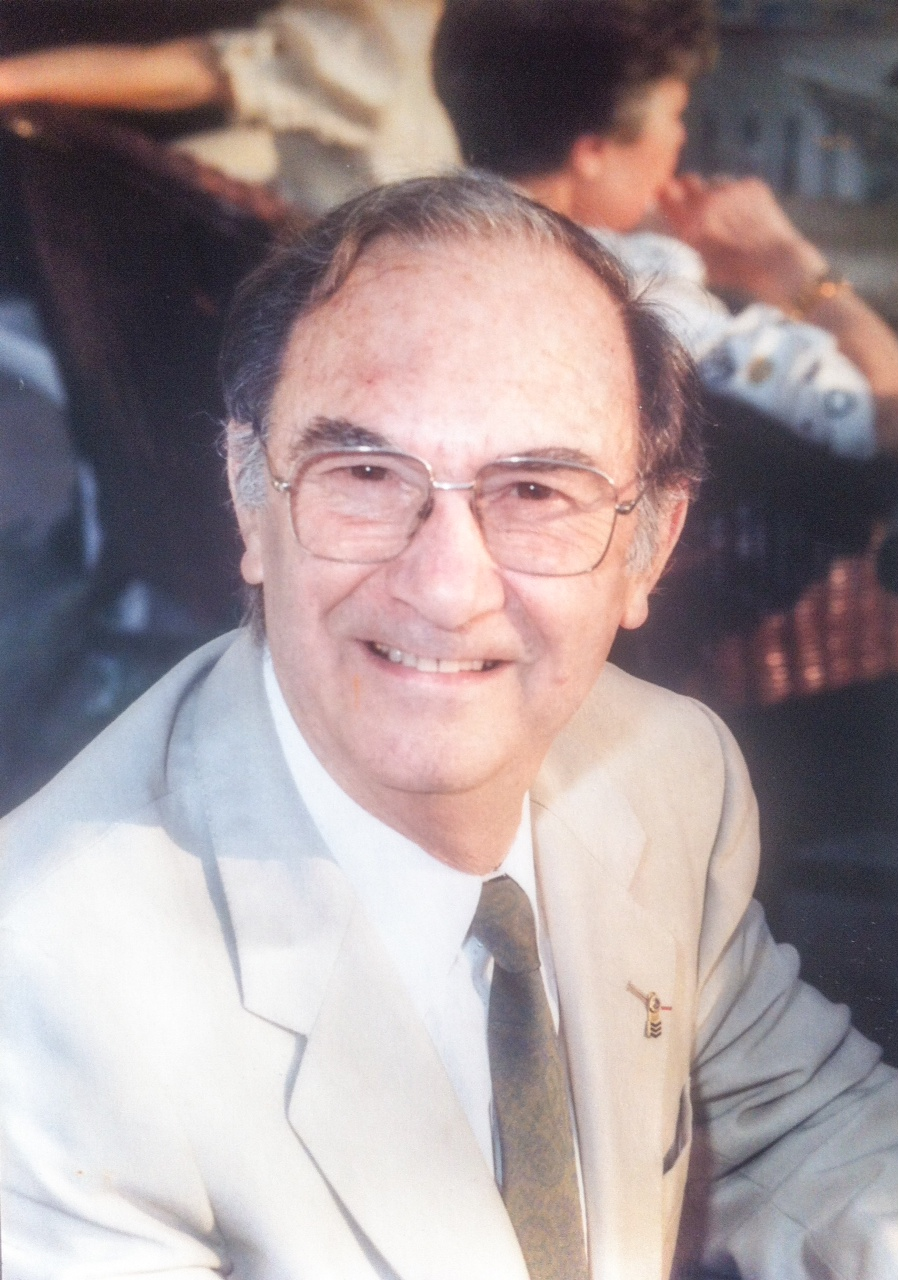
- Pierre Roux-Dorlut in 1992.
- Born: October 10, 1919; Le Puy-en-Velay
- Died: February 19, 1995 (aged 75); 10th arrondissement of Paris
- Citizenship: French
- Occupation: Architect
- Spouse: Christine Roux-Dorlut

Pierre Roux-Dorlut (October 10, 1919 - 19 February 1995) was a French architect and urbanist from Puy-en-Velay.

== Career ==
Pierre Roux-Dorlut graduated in 1941 at the fine arts school of Marseille to become a architecte des bâtiments civils et palais nationaux (civil buildings and national palaces architect), a former architectural body in France which specialised in restoration. He met Daniel Badani at the institute in 1946, and the duo founded an architectural firm together in Montpellier.

The firm operated in French West Africa from 1950 to 1958. Roux-Dorlut and Badani designed urbanism plans and buildings in Abidjan and Dakar, such as the Grand Conseil de l'Afrique-Occidentale française de Dakar (Dakar Grand Council of French West Africa; today the Senegalese National Assembly building), or the Abidjan supreme court. The firm was made up of 75 people across Paris, Montpellier and, in the 1950s, Abidjan.

In France, the firm participated in reconstruction and real estate revitalisation projects, following the devastation of World War II. Such projects include the reconstruction of the Consigne quay in Sète (1946-1950), council estates in Saint-Maurice-Vallon des fleurs and Las Planas in Nice (from 1956), and in the Iranget district of Béziers. These projects demonstrate the firm's integration efforts, namely the use of grey-pink local quarry stones, and the use of ashlar masonry in Béziers.

In the 1960s, the firm worked on numerous public and private contracts in Metropolitan France, including the "nouveau Créteil" (new Créteil), when the Val-de-Marne department was established; the Gambetta tower and the Maréchal Leclerc residence in La Défense; and the new "head" of the Sèvres bridge. The firm also built schools and universities in Béziers and Clermont-Ferrand.

Roux-Dorlut was a consultant architect for the ministère de l'Équipement (equipment minister) for eleven years in the Languedoc-Roussillon departments (Pyrénées-Orientales, Gard, Hérault, Lozère). From 1970, he exercised his functions in Calvados, in Normandy. After having presided the Conseil général des bâtiments de France du ministère des Affaires culturelles (general council of buildings of France of the cultural affairs minister), he was appointed to represent the minister at the regional commission of real estate operations and architecture for the Auvergne region.

=== Career with Christine Roux-Dorlut ===
Pierre Roux-Dorlut worked in partnership with his wife, architect Christine Roux-Dorlut.

Christine Roux-Dorlut graduated from the Warsaw Polytechnic, then the Ecole Spéciale d’Architecture in Paris and the Institute of Urban Planning at the Sorbonne. She devoted a thesis to the Nancy architect Emmanuel HERE, worked under Le Corbusier’s direction for the development of Venise, collaborated with Bodiansky and Candilis at the Atelier des Bâtisseurs set up by Le Corbusier. She is a member of the Academy of Architecture, President of the Anglo-French Union of Architects, Professor at the Schools of American Arts at Fontainbleau. She received the Beauty Award from the City of Paris, member of CIAM, officier of the Legion of Honour.

Christine Roux-Dorlut has designed numerous collective and one-family housing projects, mainly with the Caisse de Dépôts and Consignations. Other achievements include: the Maure Vieil urban plan (Alpes Maritimes), study of an arts and crafts village, head office of Amalgamated Dental at Rueil Malmaison, housing and service premises in Paris and the Île-de-France.

She participated in the urban development plan for Alger (Annassaires new town). Recently she supervised the rehabilitation of the Bel Air Château and estate at Deauville and designed the Gershwin building in Boulogne-sur-Seine. In partnership with Pierre Roux-Dorlut she developed a project for a theme park in a large leisure area, Orlando, Florida. Together they worked on an extensive project at Vence, the home of Matisse, the Artists' City, a centre of contemporary art in the Esterel, a block of one-family housing at Boulogne-sur-Seine, the rehabilitation of a 17th-century château at Montfort l'Amaury.

== Notable works ==
=== Africa ===
Roux-Dorlut and Badani's first achievements were in Africa, notably in Abidjan where they built, among other works, the courtrooms for the Palace of Justice, the Central Posts and Telecommunications Building, and various residential districts; in Dakar, where they built the Palais du Grand Conseil, which became the National Assembly of Senegal; and in Bouake, where they built the general hospital.

=== France ===
In France they produced the plans and numerous buildings for the Centre for Nuclear Studies at Marcoul and at Cadarache, competition projects like the Vincennes Stadium, residential complexes both in the South and in the Paris area, and educational, industrial, public, and administrative buildings throughout the country.

In all these projects, Roux-Dorlut expresses a preference for very careful organization of volumes, spaces, and open green areas in relation to their surroundings.

One of the architect's later projects was St Louis Hospital, where new architectural forms and volumes were incorporated around a 17th-century historical monument. At the University of Nancy, the design emphasized the relationship between the buildings and their urban surroundings, as well as the selection of materials. These projects demonstrate the architect's approach of developing different forms and compositions for individual projects.

He is especially interested in large-scale designs, amongst which the project for the new Royal Hippone City and the University of Constantine in Algeria, also major undertakings such as the Cézeaux Science Park at Clermont Ferrand, the regional head offices of Crédit Agricole bank at Montpellier, the National Polytechnic Institute at Nancy and the Urban Development building complex in the Sèvres bridge quarter at Boulogne-sur-Seine.
