= Cédric Agrain =

French footballer (born 1985)

Personal information
- Date of birth: March 28, 1985 (age 41)
- Place of birth: Le Puy-en-Velay, Haute-Loire, France
- Height: 1.81 m (5 ft 11 1/2 in)
- Position: Striker

Team information
- Current team: Trélissac

Senior career*
Years	Team	Apps	(Gls)
2003–2004	Bordeaux B	25	(7)
2004–2007	LB Châteauroux	5	(0)
2008–2009	Clermont Foot	2	(0)
2009–2011	Carquefou	51	(17)
2012–	Trélissac		
- * Club domestic league appearances and goals

Cédric Agrain (born 28 March 1985) is a French professional footballer who currently plays as a striker for Championnat National 3 club Trélissac FC.

== Career ==
He played on the professional level in Ligue 2 for LB Châteauroux and Clermont Foot.
