= Léon Sagnol =

French politician

Léon Sagnol (5 October 1891 – 7 June 1991) was a French politician.

Sagnol was born in Le Puy-en-Velay. He represented the Radical Party in the National Assembly from 1956 to 1958.
