= Nikolas Weinstein =

American glass artist

- Born: 1968 (age 57–58); New York City
- Education: École des Beaux-Arts, Université de Nantes
- Alma mater: Brown University
- Known for: Large-scale glass sculptures
- Notable work: Pariser Platz Chandelier: DZ Bank Building, Intercontinental Hotel, Shanghai, The Mariott, Hong Kong
- Website: https://nikolas.net

Nikolas Weinstein (born 1968) is a San Francisco-based American glass artist known for his large-scale architectural sculptures. Weinstein's primary medium is Borosilicate Glass tube which he shapes using a modern kiln casting technique in custom kilns —some of which include a computer-operated pin bed. Weinstein's sculptures mimic flowing fabric or origami. Several of Weinstein's sculptures hang in public buildings in Asia.

== Early life ==
Nikolas Weinstein was born in 1968 in New York City to parents who both had artistic careers. His father, Richard S. Weinstein, worked in urban planning for New York City before moving to Los Angeles to become dean of the Graduate School of Architecture and Urban Planning at the University of California, Los Angeles. His mother was a sculptor.

Weinstein received his BA in comparative literature from Brown University in 1990. He also studied at Université de Nantes & École des Beaux-Arts, Nantes, France Before glass blowing, Weinstein worked briefly in a stained glass shop in Brooklyn, New York. Later, Weinstein took lessons at a glassblowing shop in Manhattan's Little Italy neighborhood and became interested in the “smoke and fire” of the trade. Upon returning to Brown, he used extra time in his last semester to enroll in a glassblowing course at Rhode Island School of Design, after which he states he “was hooked.”

After graduation, Weinstein moved to San Francisco and worked as a graphic designer while continuing to blow glass in his free time. He managed to get some of his glassblowing work into a few small design shops. Weinstein's style of glassblowing builds on nature, shapes, and movement, which interested him from an early age via internships at the NY American Museum of Natural History and the Scripps Institution of Oceanography.

== Career ==
Weinstein's studio opened in 1991. Since his first large commission, the DZ Bank building at Pariser Platz, Weinstein has become known for his innovations in glass art which he uses to build his large-scale, sculptural glass installations. Weinstein uses a unique four-meter long kiln which he designed himself to fuse and shape glass tubes in one pass. The kiln features a bed covered with discs on rods that can be raised or lowered to shape softened glass. The design was inspired by “pin screens”, the toys that record impressions of a face or hand in a layer of movable pins.

Weinstein, whose designs focus on light, shapes, and movement describes glassblowing as a “team sport” and has 10 to 12 people working on each project, along with an engineer to analyze the stresses on the sculpture and calculate the amount of glass required.

In an interview with GLASS Quarterly, Weinstein stated that all his pieces are in “response to their surrounding architecture” and that [he] “always wanted pieces that were big enough that they would be considered as much an element in a building as the foundation or the façade.”

== Notable works ==
=== The Pariser Platz Chandelier: DZ Bank Building, Germany ===
Commissioned in 1996 by architect Frank O. Gehry, the project was Weinstein's entry into the commercial market, and his first foray into large-scale glass installations. Weinstein designed and constructed a chandelier for the atrium of the DG Bank building in Berlin. The installation consists of 30 “clouds” of glass floating a few meters above the ground. With a total weight of 2.5 tons, an area of more than 2,000 square feet, taking and four years to complete, the installation was one of the largest all-glass sculptures in the world.

To create the sculpture, which filters a mix of sunlight and artificial light, Weinstein enlisted an expert team including a man who designed windows for the space shuttle, a builder of mirrors for the Hubble Space Telescope, and a physicist who models random processes. Together they designed a brand new kiln and special software to assemble the “clouds.”

To test the safety of hanging huge glass sculptures overhead in public buildings, Weinstein worked with Herb Miska, who designed windows for airlines. During his testing, Miska noted that the glass did not shatter easily, and upon further study, realized that the glass panels behaved “like old Spanish forts built of coral, whose porous material was great at absorbing the impact of cannon balls, with all the energy of an impact being dissipated through the many tiny natural breaks.” He deduced that Weinstein had created a sculpture with “fortress-like strength” and that the panels wouldn't fail catastrophically in a construction accident.” The piece has been called “unparalleled in the whole world.”

Completion of the chandelier led to other architectural and commercial commissions, most of which are in Asia, where Weinstein states the continent has “more adventurous tastes in art.”

=== Bar Agricole, San Francisco, CA ===
Skylights in a cocktail lounge in the San Francisco Bay area, fitted with glass sculptural “curtains” made to resemble fabric blowing in the wind, transform a formerly-abandoned warehouse space into a posh “modern urban tavern.” Listed as “the best restaurant sculpture”, the Bar Agricole artwork was designed to withstand earthquake forces over 1G. The glass curtains contribute to the building's eco-attributes by amplifying the natural light throughout the space.

=== Capella Hotel, Singapore ===
Made of 10,000 tubes of glass, the sculpture floats above the ballroom of the Capella Hotel in Singapore.

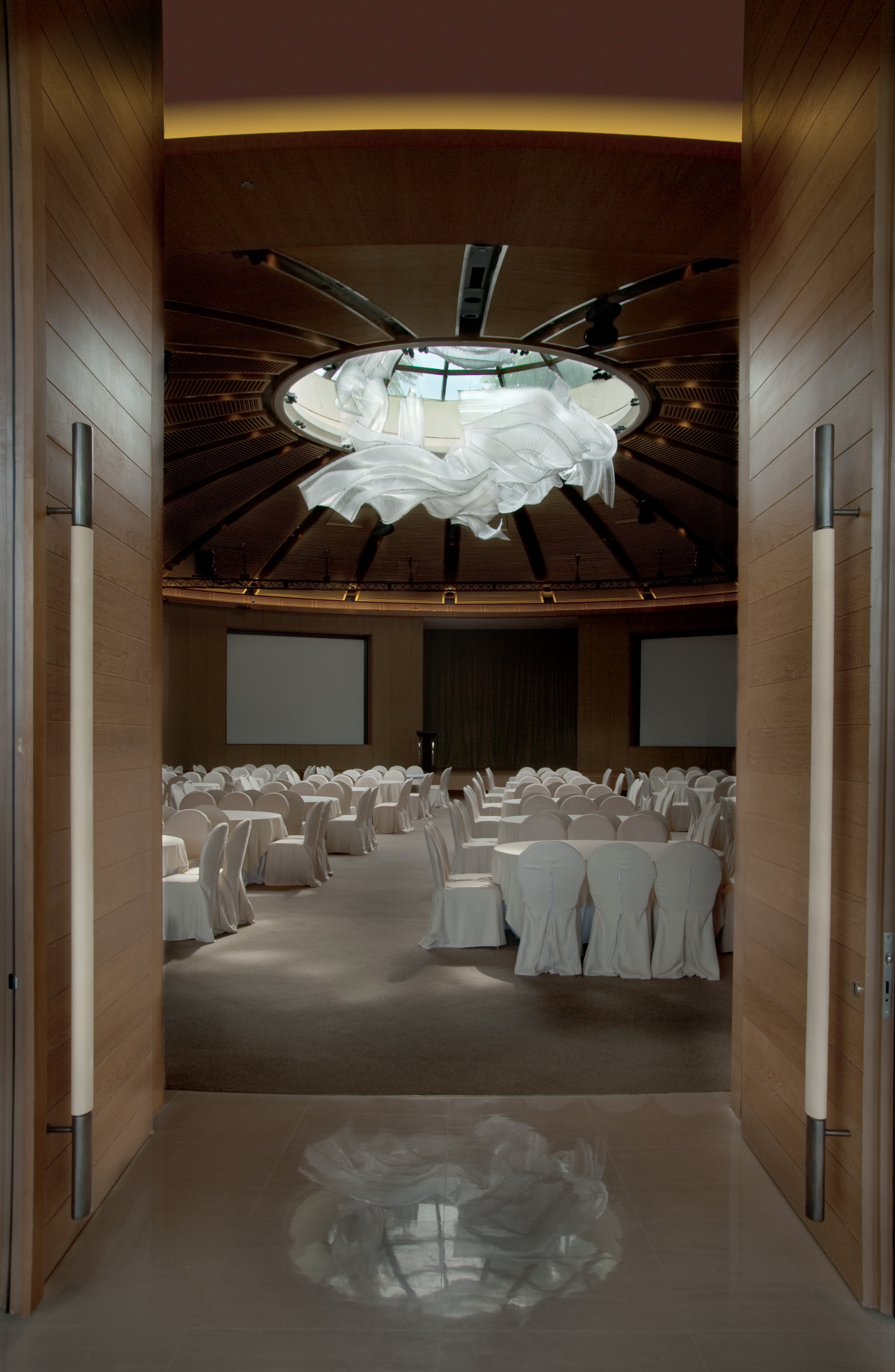
Glass sculpture hanging in the Capella Hotel, Singapore.

=== The Cosmopolitan Condominiums, Singapore ===
Weinstein designed a forest of semi-transparent 20-foot high glass stalks emerging from a bed of stone. The design was inspired by the site's architecture, which is all about columns. A custom kiln was designed for the project.

=== InterContinental Hotel, Shanghai ===
Envisioned by Weinstein as a “loose line of Chinese calligraphy” a jellyfish-like sculpture floats down from the center of the ballroom and twists like a ribbon through two lobbies of the hotel.

=== Leedon Park private residence installation, Singapore ===
Weinstein created a rigid glass tube sculpture resembling rolling waves, with the glass tubes taking on the changing colors of their surroundings.

=== The Mariott, Hong Kong ===
Completed in 2013, the sculpture in the lobby of the Mariott Hong Kong Sha Tim is made of 58,000 glass tubes and almost six miles of steel cable, the artwork weaves between the building's columns, and seems to accompany guests as they ascend the stairs to the second floor. The sculpture is 8.8 feet wide, 53.6 feet long, and 8.4 feet high and is made of nearly 60,000 individual glass tubes. The total length of the sculpture laid end-to-end is over 11 kilometers.

=== Noble House (office building), Jakarta, Indonesia ===
Installed in 2016, the sculpture is the largest and most complex to date with eight panels spanning the length of the building's lobby space, with the largest panel exceeding the size of an 18-wheeler. At 164 feet long, 39 feet wide, and 43 feet tall, it was the largest installation Weinstein completed. The installation required an engineering team to ensure the integrity of the sculpture as the area is prone to earthquakes. In addition to his design team of 10, Weinstein partnered with Arup, the structural engineering firm involved in building the Sydney Opera House.

=== OPUS (Residential Tower), Hong Kong ===
Another Frank Gehry commission for Weinstein is the Opus residential tower in Hong Kong, which is a sculptural impression of the architectural design of the towers and is located in the building's lobby. Four glass-tube columns “mimic the torque of the building, twisting up through the double-height space. Made up of thousands of six-millimeter tubes, the sculpture is delicately constructed to complement the intimate lobby space.”

== Awards ==
- 2012: San Francisco Department of Commerce: Export Achievement Award, Supporting Innovation and Exports in the Bay Area.
- 2013: 33rd Annual Gold Key Awards for Excellence in Hospitality Design: Hospitality Design Award for sculptural glass installation, Courtyard by Marriot, Hong Kong Shat Tin.

== Sources ==
- American Craft. (1999). United States: American Craft Council. Page 85.
- Architecture intérieure-Créé. (2001). France: Société d'édition et de presse. Page 68.
- Art in America: Annual guide to galleries, museums, artists. (2001). United States: Art in America, Incorporated. Pages 209, 317.
- Art Now Gallery Guide: International. (1996). United States: Art Now, Incorporated, Pages 4–5.
- Aya Brackett, Best Life, May 2008, Page 59.
- Borgelt, C., Jost, R. (2004). DZ Bank AG, Pariser Platz, Berlin. Germany: Stadtwandel-Verlag., Pgs, 8, 20. ISBN 9783937123141, 3937123148.
- Collector's Guide - 1999-2000, Active Interest Media, Inc. Volume 13, No. 2. ISSN 1073-2063. Page 394.
- Collector's Guide - 2000, Active Interest Media, Inc. Volume 14, No. 1, ISSN 1073-2063. Page 126.
- Collector's Guide - 2002, Active Interest Media, Inc. Volume 16, No. 1. ISSN 1073-2063 Page 73.
- Dodd, G. Glass Engineering without the Concept of Stress
- Evans, K. (2006). Bay Area by Design: An Insider's Guide to a San Francisco Decorator's Secret Sources. United States: Ten Speed Press. Page 59. ISBN 9781580087469, 1580087469.
- Fodor's Boston 2011. (2010). United Kingdom: Fodor's Travel Publications. Page 204.
- Guides, F. T. (2014). Fodor's New England: With the Best Fall Foliage Drives & Scenic Road Trips. United Kingdom: Fodor's Travel. ISBN 9780804142472, 0804142475.
- Kealy, K. (2009). Fodor's 2010 Boston. United Kingdom: Fodor's, Page 166.
- Knight, J. (2000). Art of glass. New Scientist, 168(2264), 42-5.
- McGee, W., Newell, C., & Willette, A. (2012). Glass Cast: A reconfigurable tooling system for free-form glass manufacturing.
- New Glass Review. (2002). United States: Corning Museum of Glass., Page 62.
- New Scientist, Volume 168, Issues 2263-2271. New Science Publications, 2000. Pages 41–44.
- Richards, B. (2006). New Glass Architecture. United Kingdom: Laurence King. Page 136. ISBN 9781856693769, 1856693767
- RIBA Journal. (2000). United Kingdom: RIBA Journals. Page 79
- Saeks, D. D. (1996). California Cottages: Interior Design, Architecture, and Style. United States: Chronicle Books. Page 173
- 建築と都市. (2002). Japan: A + U Publishing Company.
