= Le Puy-en-Velay =

Prefecture of Haute-Loire, Auvergne-Rhône-Alpes, France

Le Puy-en-Velay Lo Puèi de Velai (Occitan)
- Prefecture and commune
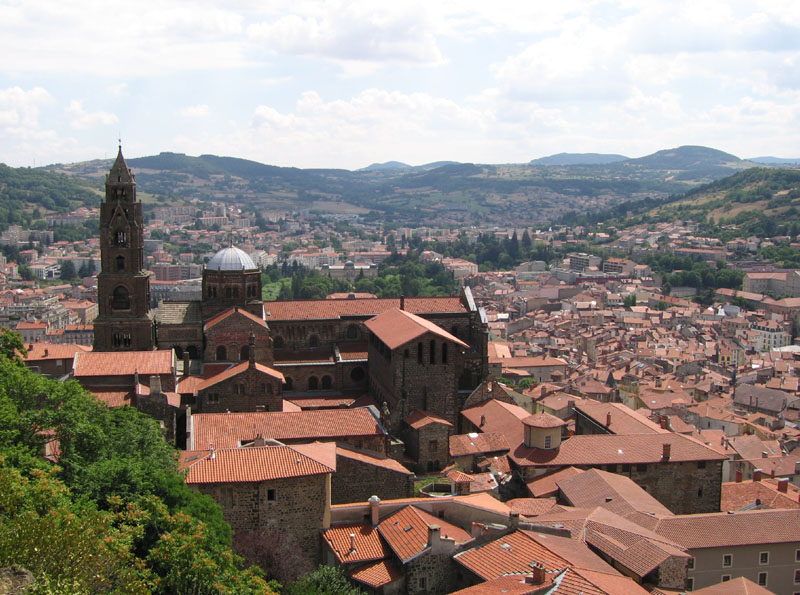
- A view of Le Puy-en-Velay

- Flag Coat of arms
- Location of Le Puy-en-Velay
- Location within France Location within Auvergne-Rhône-Alpes
- Coordinates: 45°02′40″N 3°53′05″E
- Country: France
- Region: Auvergne-Rhône-Alpes
- Department: Haute-Loire
- Arrondissement: Le Puy-en-Velay
- Canton: Le Puy-en-Velay-1, 2, 3 and 4
- Intercommunality: CA du Puy-en-Velay

Government
  - Mayor (2020–2026): Michel Chapuis (DVC)
- Area^{1}: 16.79 km^{2} (6.48 sq mi)
- Elevation: 630 m (2,070 ft)
- Highest elevation: 888 m (2,913 ft)
- Lowest elevation: 600 m (2,000 ft)
- Population (2023): 18,540
  - Density: 1,104/km^{2} (2,860/sq mi)
- Demonym(s): Ponot, anicien (masculine); Ponote, anicienne (feminine)
- Time zone: UTC+01:00 (CET)
  - Summer (DST): UTC+02:00 (CEST)
- INSEE/Postal code: 43157 /43000
- ^{1} French Land Register data, which excludes lakes, ponds, glaciers > 1 km^{2} (0.386 sq mi or 247 acres) and river estuaries.

Le Puy-en-Velay (French pronunciation: [lə pɥi ɑ̃ vəlɛ], lit. 'Le Puy in Velay'; Occitan: Lo Puèi de Velai [lu ˈpœj ðə vəˈlaj], before 1988: Le Puy) is the prefecture of the Haute-Loire department in the Auvergne-Rhône-Alpes region of south-central France.

Located near the river Loire, the city is famous for its cathedral, for a kind of lentil, for its lace-making, as well as for being the origin of the Chemin du Puy, one of the principal origin points of the pilgrimage route of Santiago de Compostela in France. As of 2023, the population of the commune was 18,540.

== History ==
Le Puy-en-Velay was a major bishopric by the early period of medieval France. Its foundation is largely legendary. According to a martyrology compiled by Ado of Vienne, published in many copies in 858, and supplemented in the mid-10th century by Gauzbert of Limoges, a priest named George accompanied a certain Front, the first Bishop of Périgueux, when they were sent to proselytize in Gaul. Front was added to the list of the apostles to Gaul, who in tradition are described as being sent out to reorganize Christians after the persecutions that are associated with Decius, circa 250. As with others of the group, notably Saint Martial of Limoges, later mythology pushed the activities of Saint Front and the priest George back in time. It tells that George had been restored to life with a touch of Saint Peter's staff.

The expanding legend of this St. George, which, according to the Church historian Louis Duchesne is not earlier than the 11th century, then makes that saint one of the seventy disciples of the Gospel of Luke. It tells that he founded the church of the [civitas] que dicitur Vetula in pago Vellavorum, the city "called Vetula in the pays of the Vellavii" was how a document of 1004 termed it. This was what the settlement of Ruessium began to be called during the 4th century. Vetula means "the old woman", and pagans were still making small images of her as late as the 6th century in Flanders, according to the vita of Saint Eligius. This was the first cathedral at Le Puy.

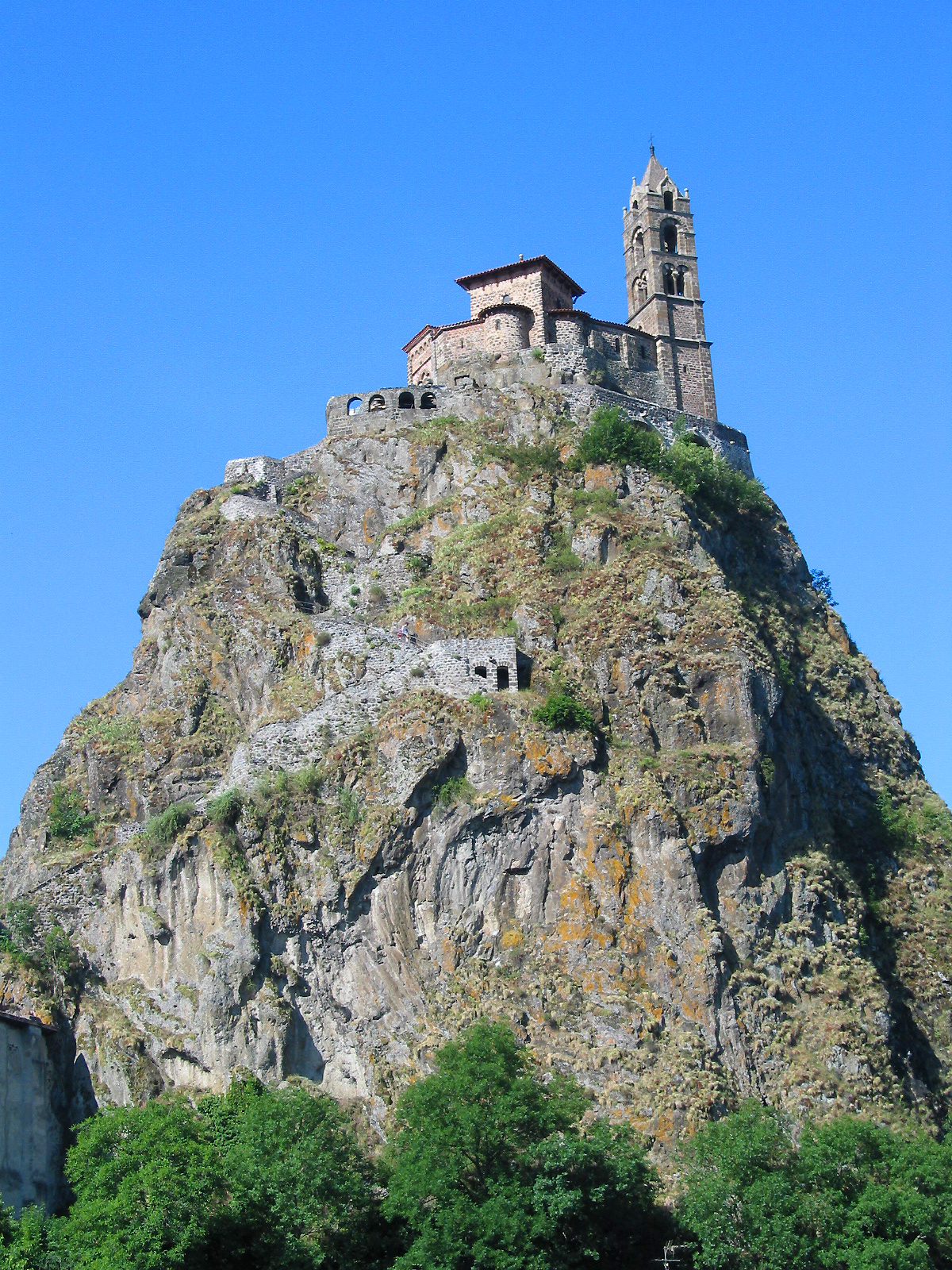
Saint Michel d'Aiguilhe Chapel.

Following St. George the founder, later medieval local traditions evoke a legendary list of bishops at this chief town of the pays of Le Velay: Macarius, Marcellinus, Roricius, Eusebius, Paulianus, and Vosy (Evodius), all of them canonized by local veneration. The Gaulish settlement of Ruessium/Vellavorum was given its Christianizing name, Saint-Paulien, from Bishop Paulianus. A bishop Evodius attended the Council of Valence in 374.

In the early 1180s peasants of Le Puy, led by a carpenter named Durandus, formed a conspiratio (sworn association) called the Capuciati (because of the white hoods they wore as a sign of their conspiratio). They challenged seigneurial dominance in a short-lived attempt at reformation.

=== Our Lady of Le Puy ===
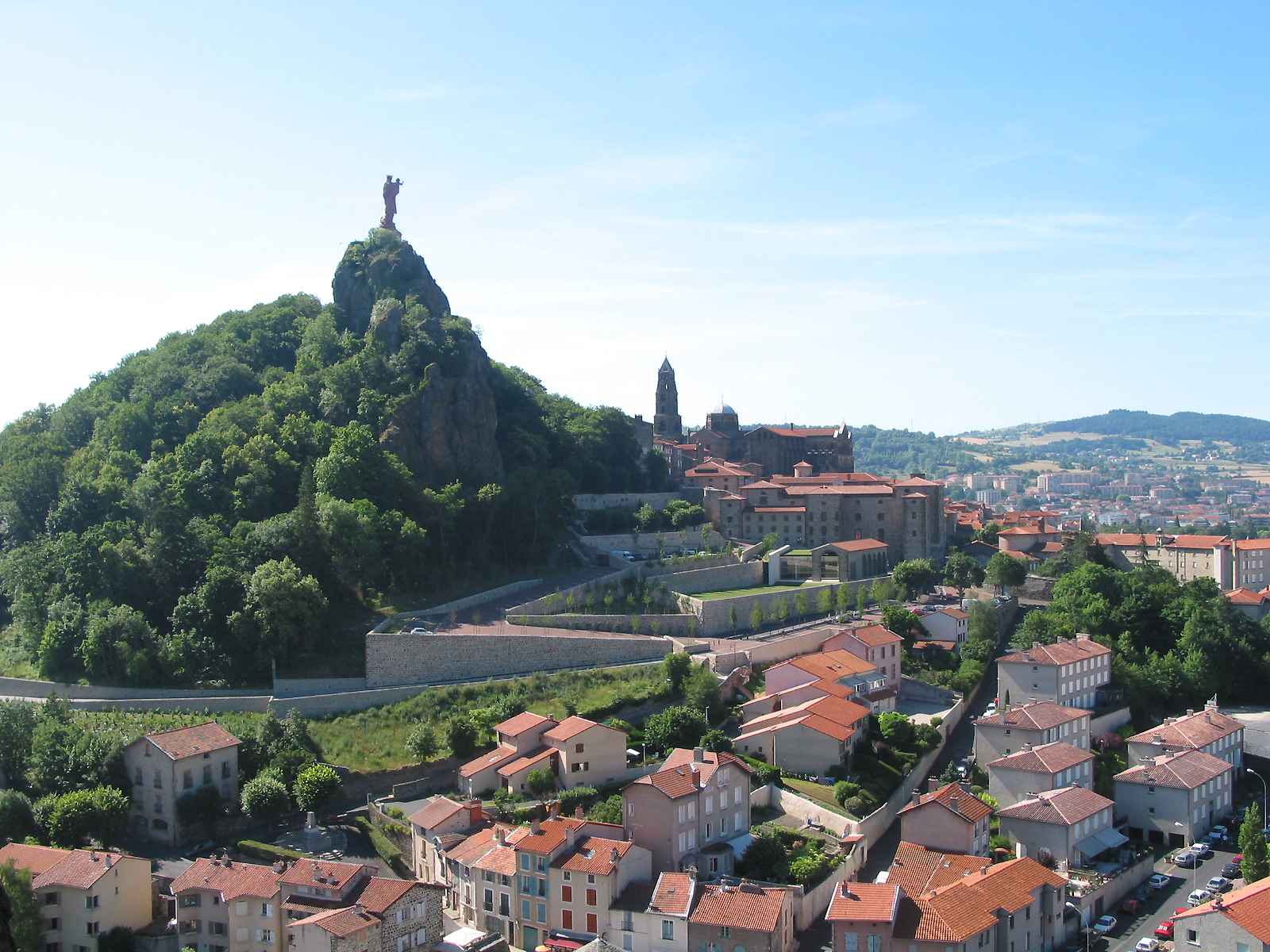
The Rocher Corneille, the Cathédrale Notre-Dame du Puy and the city.

The Christianization legends of Mons Anicius relate that at the request of Bishop Martial of Limoges, Bishop Evodius/Vosy ordered an altar to the Virgin Mary to be erected on the pinnacle that surmounts Mont Anis. Some such beginning of the shrine Christianized the pagan site; it later became the altar site of the cathedral of Le Puy. This marked one starting-point or meeting-point for the pilgrim route to Santiago de Compostela, a walk of some 1600 km, as it still does today. The old town of Le Puy developed around the base of the cathedral.

Pilgrims were early visitors to Le Puy, and it was the most popular destination in France during the Middle Ages. Charlemagne came twice, in 772 and 800. There is a legend that in 772, he established a foundation at the cathedral for ten poor canons (chanoines de paupérie), and he chose Le Puy, with Aachen and Saint-Gilles, as a center for the collection of Peter's Pence. Other notable medieval visitors to Le Puy were Charles the Bald in 877, Odo, count of Paris in 892, Robert II in 1029, and Philip Augustus in 1183.

Louis IX met James I of Aragon here in 1245, and in 1254, when passing through Le Puy on his return from the Holy Land, he gave the cathedral an ebony image of the Blessed Virgin clothed in gold brocade. She is one of the many dozens of venerable "Black Virgins" of France. It was destroyed during the Revolution, but replaced at the Restoration with a copy that continues to be venerated. After him, Le Puy was visited by Philip the Bold in 1282, by Philip the Fair in 1285, by Charles VI in 1394, by Charles VII in 1420, and by Isabelle Romée, the mother of Joan of Arc, in 1429. Louis XI made the pilgrimage in 1436 and 1475, and in 1476 halted three leagues from the city and walked barefoot to the cathedral. Charles VIII visited it in 1495, Francis I in 1533.

The legendary ancient shrine on the summit of Mons Anicius, which drew so many, would seem to predate the founding of an early church of Our Lady of Le Puy at Anicium. It was attributed to Bishop Vosy, who transferred the episcopal see from Ruessium to Anicium. Crowning the hill was a megalithic dolmen. A local tradition rededicated the curative virtue of the sacred site to Mary, who healed ailments when a person touched the standing stone. When the founding bishop Vosy climbed the hill, he found that it was snow-covered in July; in the snowfall the tracks of a deer around the dolmen outlined the foundations of the future church. The Bishop was apprised in a vision that the angels themselves had dedicated the future cathedral to the Blessed Virgin, whence the epithet "Angelic" given to the cathedral of Le Puy. The great dolmen was left standing in the center of the Christian sanctuary, which was constructed around it; the stone was re-consecrated as the Throne of Mary. By the 8th century, however, the stone, popularly known as the "stone of visions", was taken down and broken up. Its pieces were incorporated into the floor of a particular section of the church that came to be called the Chambre Angélique, or the "angels' chamber".

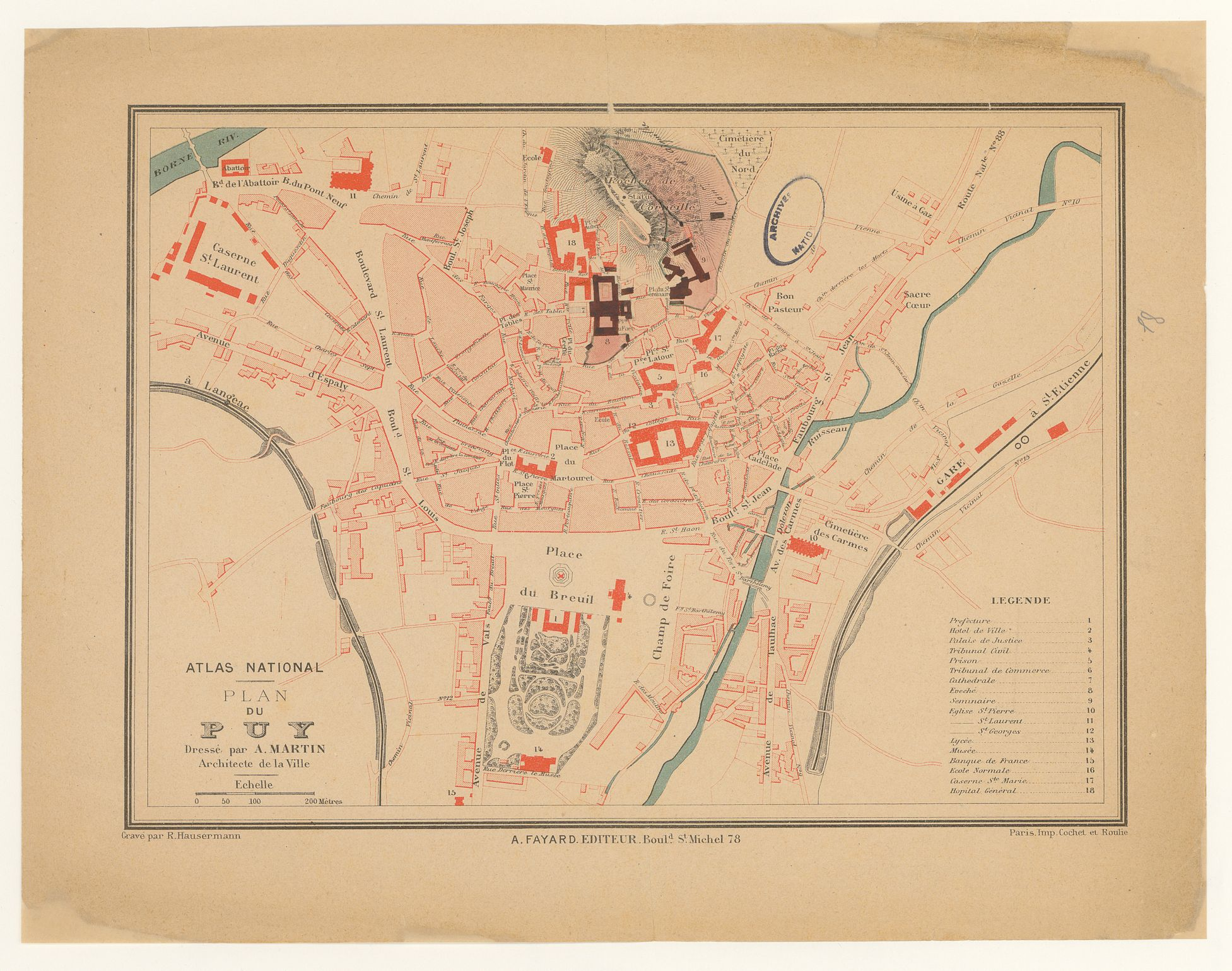
Map of Le Puy-en-Velay (19th century)

It is impossible to say whether this St. Evodius is the same person who signed the decrees of the Council of Valence in 374. Neither can it be affirmed that St. Benignus, who in the 7th century founded a hospital at the gates of the basilica, and St. Agrevius, the 7th-century martyr from whom the town of Saint-Agrève Chiniacum took its name, were really bishops. Duchesne thinks that the chronology of these early bishops rests on very little evidence and that very ill-supported by documents. Before the 10th century, only six individuals are known of whom it can be said with certainty that they were bishops of Le Puy. The first of these, Scutarius, the legendary architect of the first cathedral, dates from the end of the 4th century according to an inscription that notes his name..

Adhemar, bishop of Le Puy was a central figure in the First Crusade. Pope Clement IV was also bishop of Le Puy.

Though the ancient diocese was suppressed by the Concordat of 1801, it was re-erected in 1823.

In February 1965, Le Puy absorbed the former commune Taulhac-près-le-Puy.

== Climate ==
Because of its altitude, Le Puy is close to a warm-summer humid continental climate (Dfb) under the Köppen system but still remains oceanic (Cfb) due to its coldest month, slightly above freezing on average. The city is prone to mountain cold in winter, with at least four months with average lows below freezing and frequent snowfall, like in Saint-Étienne in the neighbouring department of Loire. Summers are pleasantly warm, with quite hot days and cool nights. On the 5th of March 2005, the temperature dipped to −22 °C.

Climate data for Le Puy-en-Velay (1981–2010 averages)
Month	Jan	Feb	Mar	Apr	May	Jun	Jul	Aug	Sep	Oct	Nov	Dec	Year
Record high °C (°F)	17.8 (64.0)	21.4 (70.5)	24.3 (75.7)	28.1 (82.6)	29.7 (85.5)	37.4 (99.3)	37.4 (99.3)	35.8 (96.4)	33.5 (92.3)	26.5 (79.7)	21.8 (71.2)	16.9 (62.4)	37.4 (99.3)
Mean daily maximum °C (°F)	4.9 (40.8)	6.5 (43.7)	9.8 (49.6)	12.5 (54.5)	17.0 (62.6)	21.0 (69.8)	24.2 (75.6)	24.0 (75.2)	19.5 (67.1)	14.8 (58.6)	8.7 (47.7)	5.6 (42.1)	14.0 (57.3)
Daily mean °C (°F)	0.8 (33.4)	1.9 (35.4)	4.6 (40.3)	7.0 (44.6)	11.2 (52.2)	14.7 (58.5)	17.3 (63.1)	17.1 (62.8)	13.3 (55.9)	9.9 (49.8)	4.5 (40.1)	1.7 (35.1)	8.7 (47.6)
Mean daily minimum °C (°F)	−3.3 (26.1)	−2.7 (27.1)	−0.7 (30.7)	1.6 (34.9)	5.3 (41.5)	8.4 (47.1)	10.5 (50.9)	10.1 (50.2)	7.1 (44.8)	4.9 (40.8)	0.4 (32.7)	−2.3 (27.9)	3.3 (37.9)
Record low °C (°F)	−23.2 (−9.8)	−20.8 (−5.4)	−22.0 (−7.6)	−10.2 (13.6)	−4.4 (24.1)	−1.3 (29.7)	1.8 (35.2)	−0.8 (30.6)	−2.5 (27.5)	−9.2 (15.4)	−13.4 (7.9)	−18.2 (−0.8)	−23.2 (−9.8)
Average precipitation mm (inches)	38.5 (1.52)	31.3 (1.23)	33.0 (1.30)	60.2 (2.37)	81.7 (3.22)	69.1 (2.72)	58.6 (2.31)	64.0 (2.52)	73.4 (2.89)	71.4 (2.81)	54.7 (2.15)	42.4 (1.67)	678.3 (26.71)
Average precipitation days	7.2	6.6	7.2	9.8	10.6	8.3	6.7	7.8	7.7	9.2	8.2	7.0	96.3
Mean monthly sunshine hours	93.7	111.1	166.9	163.8	191.0	221.4	261.2	234.6	179.7	126.7	84.0	75.5	1,909.6
Source: Infoclimat

== Transport ==
The city is served by Le Puy–Loudes Airport, located 12 km (7.5 mi) north west of Le Puy-en-Velay. However, the airport only provides one flight to Paris which is operated by Twin Jet. The nearest major airport is Lyon–Saint-Exupéry Airport, located 148 km (92 mi) north east of the city. The airport provides most domestic and international flights.

The city is also served by trains to St Etienne and to Clermont-Ferrand.

== Population ==
Historical population

Year	Pop.	±% p.a.
1793	11,060	—
1800	10,601	−0.60%
1806	12,318	+2.53%
1821	14,844	+1.25%
1831	14,930	+0.06%
1836	14,924	−0.01%
1841	14,674	−0.34%
1846	14,995	+0.43%
1851	15,723	+0.95%
1856	16,666	+1.17%
1861	17,015	+0.42%
1866	19,532	+2.80%
1872	19,233	−0.26%
1876	19,250	+0.02%
1881	18,825	−0.45%
1886	19,031	+0.22%
1891	20,308	+1.31%
1896	20,793	+0.47%
1901	20,570	−0.22%

Year	Pop.	±% p.a.
1906	21,420	+0.81%
1911	20,944	−0.45%
1921	18,488	−1.24%
1926	19,821	+1.40%
1931	20,288	+0.47%
1936	21,660	+1.32%
1946	22,705	+0.47%
1954	23,453	+0.41%
1962	25,125	+0.86%
1968	26,389	+0.82%
1975	26,594	+0.11%
1982	24,064	−1.42%
1990	21,743	−1.26%
1999	20,490	−0.66%
2007	18,885	−1.01%
2012	18,599	−0.30%
2017	18,995	+0.42%
2023	18,540	−0.40%

Source: EHESS and INSEE (1968–2023)

== Sights ==
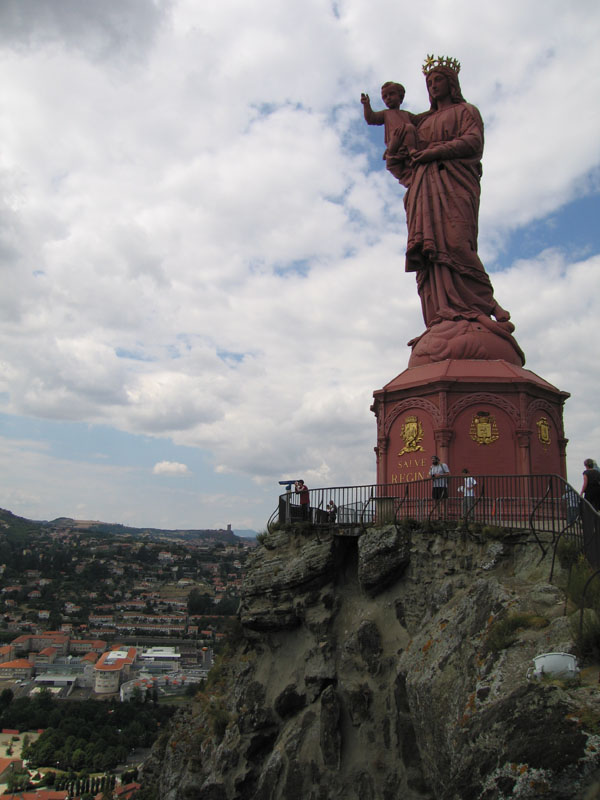
Notre-Dame de France

Le Puy-en-Velay's most striking attraction is the Cathédrale Notre-Dame du Puy, dating chiefly from the first half of the 12th century. The façade, striped in courses of white sandstone and black volcanic breccia, is reached by a flight of sixty steps, and consists of three orders, the lowest composed of three high arcades opening into the porch, which extends beneath the first bays of the nave. Above it are three central windows that light the nave, and above them are three gables on the gable-end of the nave, flanked by two openwork screening gables. The south transept doorway is sheltered by a Romanesque porch. Behind the choir rises a separate Romanesque bell-tower in seven storeys.

The bays of the nave are roofed by octagonal cupolas, the cupola at the crossing forming a lantern; the choir and transepts are barrel vaulted. The striking parti-colored cloister is connected to remains of 13th-century fortifications that separated the cathedral precincts from the rest of the city. Near the cathedral, the 11th-century baptistery of St John is built on Roman foundations.

The iron statue of Notre-Dame de France (The Virgin Mary) overlooking the town was designed by the French sculptor Jean-Marie Bonnassieux, and is made from 213 Russian cannons taken in the Siege of Sevastopol (1854–1855). It was presented to the town on 12 September 1860 in front of 120,000 people.

Three miles from Le Puy are the ruins of the Château de Polignac, one of the most important feudal strongholds.

Each morning, pilgrims gather to be blessed before starting their journey to Santiago de Compostela. The cathedral has been a Unesco World Heritage Site since 1998, as part of the "Routes of Santiago de Compostela in France". Fountain Crozatier is also a noted site in the centre of the town.

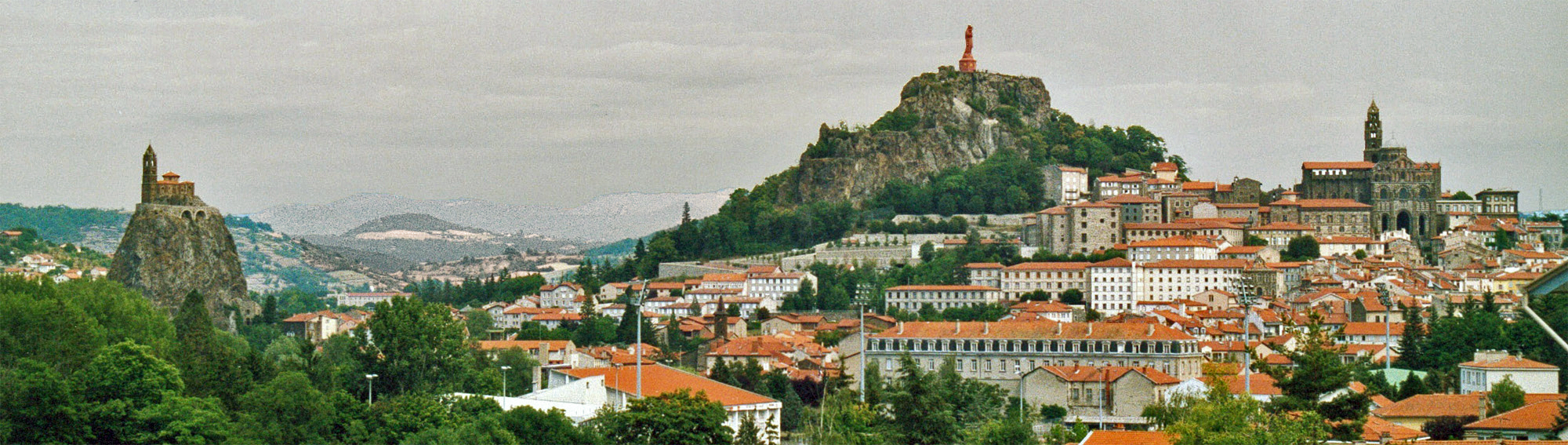

== Notable people ==
- Adhemar of Le Puy (c. 1045–1098), papal legate, one of the main leaders during the First Crusade
- Cédric Agrain (b. 1985), footballer
- Auguste Aymard (1808–1889), prehistorian, palaeontologist.
- Marion Bartoli (b. 1984), tennis player, 2013 Wimbledon champion
- Peire Cardenal (1180–1278), Occitan troubadour
- Jean Chaleyé (1878–1960), painter and lace designer, taught lace design and died in Le Puy-en-Velay
- Antoine Clet (1705–1785), king's printer, writer
- Guillaume Coelho (b. 1986), footballer
- Grégory Coupet (b. 1972), ex-football player for Lyon, France national team
- Johanne Defay (b. 1993), surfer
- Pierre Roux-Dorlut (1919–1995), architect and urbanist
- Charles Dupuy (1851–1923), politician, president of the council during the Third Republic
- Émile Fayolle (1852–1928), marshall, commanded troops in World War I
- Guy François (1578–1650), painter
- Sidney Govou (b. 1979), football player for Evian TG, France national team
- Pierre Julien (1731–1804), neoclassical sculptor
- Bruno Julliard (b. 1981), chairman of UNEF, son of mayor of Le Puy-en-Velay, Arlette Arnaud-Landau
- Julien Malzieu (b. 1983), rugby union player with ASM Clermont Auvergne, France national team
- Anne-Marie Martel (1644–73), founder of what is now the Congrégation des Sœurs de l'Enfant-Jésus
- Gustave Mesny (1886–1945), army general
- Pierre de Mirmande, dignitary and superior of the Order of Saint-John of Jerusalem during the Crusades
- Gilbert du Motier, Marquis de Lafayette (1757–1834), born near Le-Puy-en-Velay, supporter of US during the war of independence
- Jérémy Perbet (b. 1984), football player for RC Strasbourg and RAEC Mons
- François Peyrard (1760–1822), first librarian of the École Polytechnique, scholar at the Collège of Le Puy in the 1770s
- Charles-Émile Reynaud (1844–1918), inventor from a Le-Puy-en-Velay family, lived there for many years
- Jean-Claude Risset (1938–2016), composer, best known for his pioneering contributions to computer music
- Léon Sagnol (1891–1991), deputy
- Jules Vallès (1832–1885), writer and journalist, author of L'Enfant
- Louis Vigouroux (1865–1956), economist, deputy for Le Puy from 1900 to 1910
- Simone Weil (1909–1943), philosopher, taught philosophy at a lycée in Le Puy in 1931–32

== Twin towns – sister cities ==
Le-Puy-en-Velay is twinned with:

- Brugherio, Italy
- Mangualde, Portugal
- Meschede, Germany
- Tonbridge and Malling, England, United Kingdom
- Tortosa, Spain

== Gastronomy ==
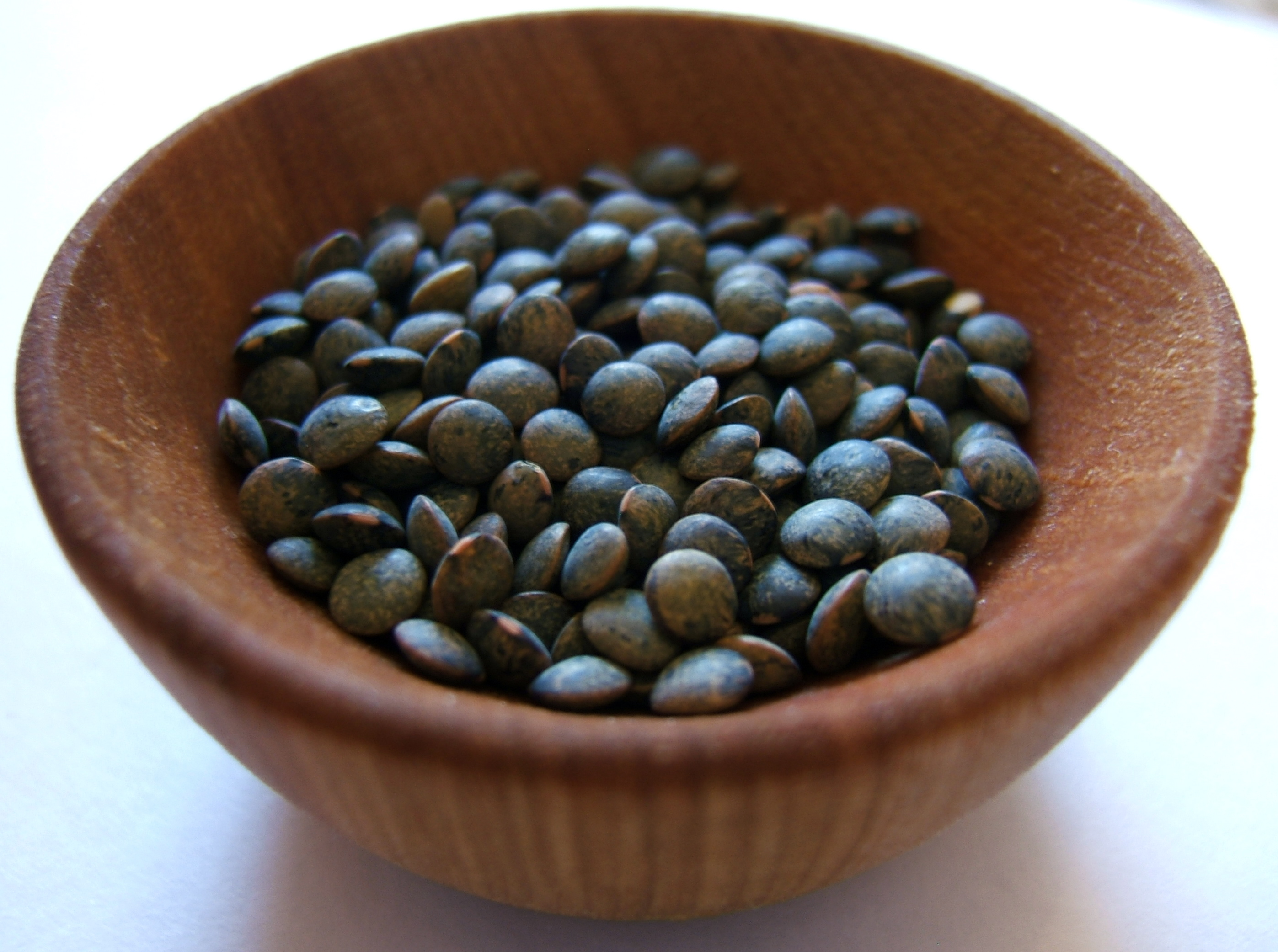
Puy lentils in a wooden bowl

Le Puy is famous for a particular strain of green lentils and for its green liqueur "Verveine" flavored with verbena.

The lentils, grown on the thin soils of the area, are very small and almost black in colour. Their unique quality and flavour derive from their high protein and relatively low carbohydrate content. They are widely used in soups and also to accompany goose, duck and sausage dishes. Le Puy green lentil (Lentille Verte du Puy) is an appellation recognised throughout the European Union (Protected Designation of Origin).

== Noteworthy events ==
=== Catholic Jubilee ===
The town holds a jubilee in years when the feast of the Annunciation falls on Good Friday. The Jubilee of Le Puy (see Jubilé du Puy-en-Velay in the French Wikipedia) occurred last in 2005 and 2016, but the next occurrence will not be until 2157. The Jubilee of Le Puy is the oldest aside from those of Rome and Jerusalem, taking its original cue from the statement of a monk Bernhard who predicted the end of the world in 992 when the feast of the Annunciation would fall on Good Friday. The number of pilgrims to Le Puy was so remarkable that, after the dread date had safely passed, Pope John XV declared that each such date would be marked by a Jubilee. The first such anniversary occurred in 1065. In the Jubilee of 1407, the press of the crowd was so great that two hundred pilgrims suffocated. Of three Jubilees in the 20th century, the Jubilee of 1932 attracted over 300,000 pilgrims.

=== Tour de France ===
Le Puy has hosted the Tour de France on six occasions. In 1954, it was the finish town of stage 15, from Millau, which was won by Dominique Forlini. The next day, Jean Forestier won the race from Le Puy to Lyon. The race did not return until 1990, when the riders retraced their predecessors' route to Millau. Marino Lejarreta won the day. In 1996 the town again hosted two stages, stage 12 from Valence, won by Pascal Richard, and stage 13 to Super-Besse, won by Rolf Sørensen. Recently, Giuseppe Guerini won the stage from Issoire in 2005. Stage 15 of the 2017 Tour de France finished in Le Puy-en-Velay. It was won by Bauke Mollema of Trek-Segafredo.

=== Fête du Roi de l'Oiseau ===
It is an annual event held for five days in late September, during which the attendants reenact a Renaissance style living, showcasing costumes, culinary traditions and spectacles inspired by the 16th century.

== See also ==
- Musée Crozatier
- List of the works of Charles Cottet depicting scenes of Brittany
