= Nantes University =

Public French university, founded in 1460

- Nantes Université
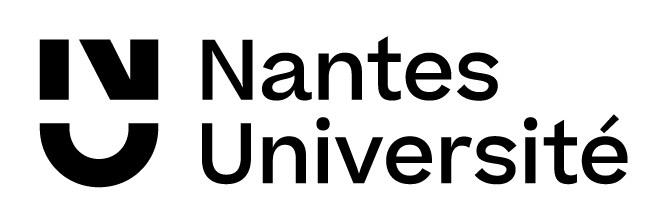
- Type: Public
- Established: April 4, 1460; 566 years ago
- Endowment: €353 million
- Chancellor: William Marois (2013-present); Rector of the Academy of Nantes
- President: Olivier Laboux (2012-present)
- Academic staff: 2,153 (2018)
- Students: 37,140 (2018-2019)
- Location: Nantes, France; 47.240°N 1.55°W
- Website: www.univ-nantes.fr

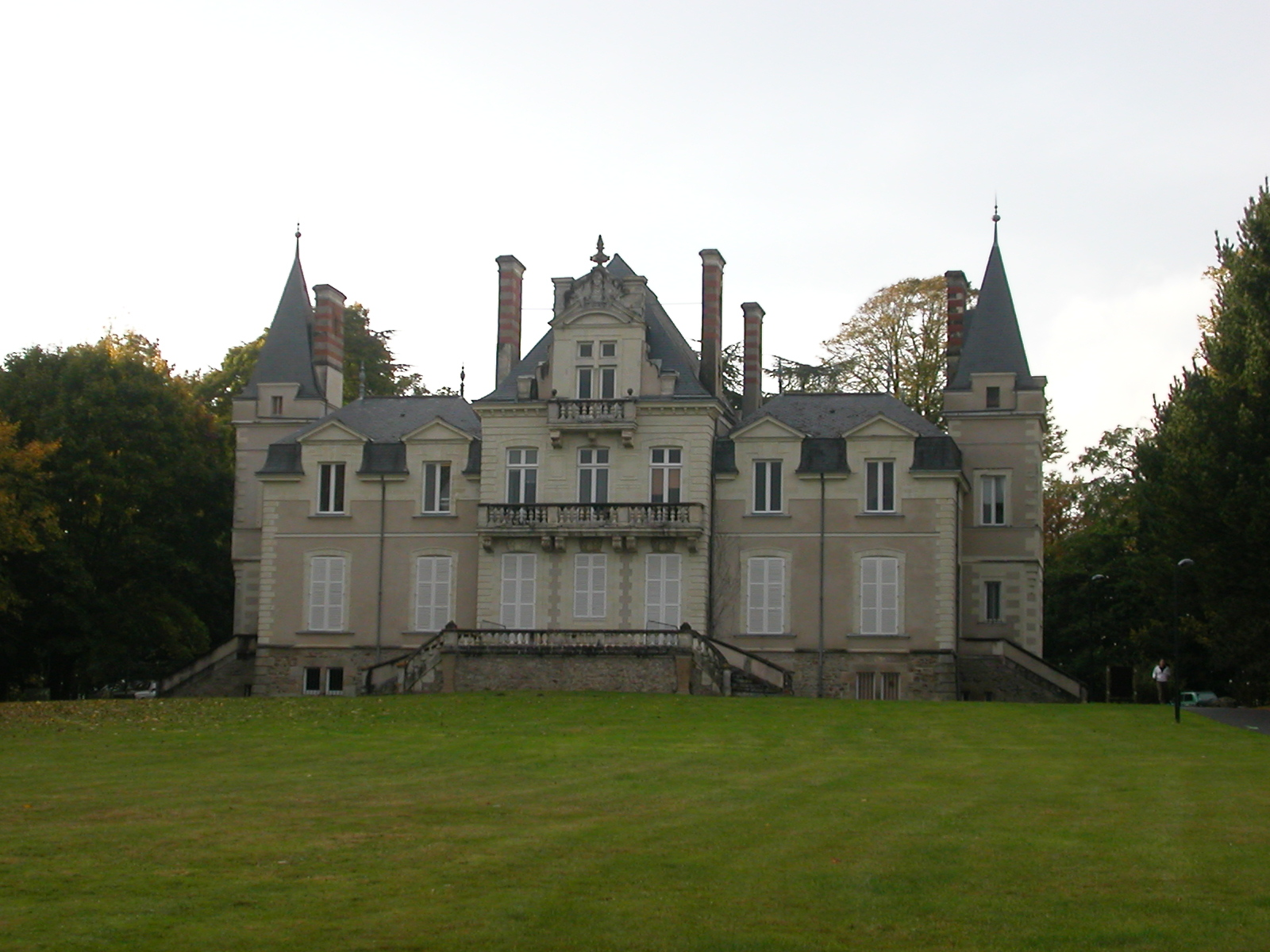
Château Tertre, Nantes University

Nantes University (French: Nantes Université) is a public university located in the city of Nantes, France. In addition to the several campuses scattered in the city of Nantes, there are two satellite campuses located in Saint-Nazaire and La Roche-sur-Yon. The university ranked between 401-500th in the Times Higher Education of 2016.

On a national scale and regarding the professional insertion after graduation, the University of Nantes oscillates between 3rd and 40th out of 69 universities depending on the field of studies. Currently, the university is attended by approximately 34,500 students. More than 10% of them are international students coming from 110 countries.

Notable alumni include former Prime Minister Jean-Marc Ayrault, former Minister of Agriculture Stéphane Le Foll, and United Nations official Clément Nyaletsossi Voule.

== History ==
The current University was founded in 1970 under the terms of the 1968 law which reformed French higher education. This newly established institution replaced the former University of Nantes which had been founded in the early 1960s. This itself was a re-establishment of the original University of Nantes which was established by papal bull in 1460 but was abolished during the French Revolution.

=== Medieval University ===
The university of Brittany was founded by Bertrand Milon on 4 April 1460, at the initiative of Francis II, Duke of Brittany under the form of a papal bull of Pope Pius II given to Sienna. This embodied the wish of François II to affirm his independence towards the French king, while near the duchy in Angers in 1432, Poitiers in 1432 and Bordeaux in 1441, universities were created. Founded under the structure of a studium generale, this university taught the traditional disciplines: Arts, Theology, Law and Medicine. The number of students between the end of the 15th century and during the two following centuries reached a thousand or 1500, according to the highest estimates.

The first attempt to move the university of Nantes to Rennes took place at the end of the 16th century. Henry IV wanted to punish Nantes, which was loyal to the Catholic League, for its support of Philippe Emmanuel, Duke of Mercœur. The university received an order from the king by a letter of 8 August 1589 to move to Rennes, a city which was loyal to the monarchy, but financial issues prevented the move. Another letter of 5 September 1591 from the king reiterated the order of transfer, but again it did not happen. In April 1598, a letter from the king stabilised the situation by confirming the establishment of the university in Nantes.

== Academics ==
=== The LMD and ECTS systems ===
Since 2004, the university has followed the LMD European system that divides the post-secondary education in 3 degrees: the Licence (equivalent of a Bachelor's degree), the Master and the Doctorat (PhD). Each course provides credits according to the European Credit Transfer System (ECTS) developed by the European Commission and a certain number of credits will allow a student to obtain their degree. For instance, the first post-secondary education degree, the Licence, can be obtained with 180 ECTS accumulated within 3 years. A full year gives 60 ECTS while a semester gives 30 ECTS.

=== List of faculties and schools ===
- Faculty of Medicine
- Faculty of Pharmacy
- Faculty of Dentistry
- Faculty of Psychology
- Faculty of Science and Technology
- Faculty of Law and Political Science
- Department of History, Art History and Archaeology
- Department of Humanities and Languages
- Department of Languages - International Language Centre (CIL)
- Department of Sociology
- Department of Science and Technology of Physical Activities and Sports (STAPS)
- Institute of Geography and Regional Planning of Université de Nantes (IGARUN)
- Institute of Economics and Management - Institute of Business Administration (IEMN-IBE)
- Institute for Research and Education in French as a Foreign Language (IRFFLE)
- Institute of Teacher Training (ÉSPÉ)
- Institute of Preparation for General Administration (IPAG)
- Observatory of Earth and Planetary Sciences (OSUNA)
- Institute of Technology of Nantes
- Institute of Technology of La Roche-sur-Yon
- Institute of Technology of Saint-Nazaire
- School of Engineering - École Polytechnique de Nantes

== Life on campus ==
=== Athletics ===
The university offers the students to practice more than 50 sports, whether it is for competitive or recreational purposes. The university also provides adapted training to athlete students and participates in national and international competitions in the following disciplines: athletics, rowing, badminton, French boxing, soccer, ice hockey, judo, swimming, and sailing. In 2011, the university was one of the first French universities to create a quidditch team.

=== Residence ===
Approximately 3,500 places on residence are available each year. These places are distributed by the CROUS on a social status basis taking into account the yearly income of the student's parents or legal representative, the number of siblings remaining under the parents' responsibility and the distance between the university and the student's place of residence.

There are two types of residences:

- The traditional ones gather 9 m^{2} single bedrooms in a building with common bathrooms and kitchens at each floor.
- The renovated ones with individual furnished apartments going from 13 to 18m^{2}.

=== Food locations ===
The CROUS from Nantes manages the student restaurants on campus as well as the meals they offer. Most of the restaurants are open for lunch and dinner from Monday to Friday and offer a complete meal at a price regulated on a yearly basis. For the academic year of 2013–2014, the price of a meal was set at €3.30 (2019-2020).

==== In Nantes ====
- La Chantrerie
- La Lombarderie
- Le Grill CHANZY
- Le Restaurant Oniris Chantrerie
- Le Restaurant Universitaire de la Fleuriaye
- Le Ricordeau
- Le Rubis
- Le Tertre

==== In Saint-Nazaire ====
- Heinlex
- Gavy

==== In La Roche-sur-Yon ====
- La Courtaisière

== International exchanges ==
The university currently has partnerships with 397 institutions in 60 countries worldwide. The majority of these partnerships are located in Europe. Each year, more than 1,000 students go abroad to study in one of those partner institutions for one or two semesters. The university receives each year students from its partner universities in exchange for welcoming the students from Nantes. The existing partnerships are ruled according to international conventions such Erasmus (Europe), ISEP and CREPUQ (Quebec).

University rankings

Global – Overall
- QS World: 851-900 (2026)

Exchange students are still registered in the University of Nantes and transfer the credits they gained in their host university. Conversely, the international students who came on exchange in Nantes will receive their credits in their home university.

There were 4,210 international students registered in the University of Nantes for the year 2018.

| Continent | Partner Universities |
|---|---|
| Africa | 19 |
| America | 52 |
| Asia | 40 |
| Europe | 283 |
| Oceania | 3 |
| Total | 397 |

== Notable faculty ==
- François Bonamy (1710–1786 in Nantes) - botanist and physician; regent to the medical faculty, procureur général, academic rector
- Gaston Bouatchidzé (1935, Georgia – 2022) - Georgian-French writer and translator.
- Pascal Salin (born 1939) - economist
- Denis Moreau (born 1967) - philosopher

== Notable alumni ==
- René Laennec (1781) - physician and musician; inventor of stethoscope
- Georges Clemenceau (1841–1929) - Prime Minister of France 1906–1909, 1917–1920
- Gabriel Guist'hau (1863–1931) - politician
- Jacqueline Auriol (1917, Challans, Vendée – 2000) - aviator who set several world speed records
- Annie Brisset - Professor of Translation Studies, Canada
- Jean-Marc Ayrault (born 1950) - Prime Minister of France 2012–2014
- Pierre Bordage (born 1955, La Réorthe, Vendée) - science fiction author
- François Bréda (1956, Romania – 2018) - Romanian essayist, poet, literary critique, literary historian, translator and theatrologist.
- Stéphane Le Foll (born 1960, Le Mans) - politician Socialist Party
- Azzedine Bousseksou (born 1964), Franco-Algerian physico-chemist
- Laurent Berger (born 1968 in Guérande, Loire-Atlantique) - trade unionist; general secretary of the French Democratic Confederation of Labour (CFDT)
- Sylvie Tellier (born 1978) - television personality, businesswoman, and beauty pageant titleholder who was crowned Miss France 2002
- Yvonne Okoro (born 1984, Nigeria) - Ghanaian-Nigerian actress
- Clément Nyaletsossi Voule (born in Togo) - diplomat and jurist.
- Jean-Marc Coicaud - legal and political theorist
- Sarah El Haïry - politician
- Nikolas Weinstein (born 1968), American glass artist
- Yasir Nawab – Vice-Chancellor of the University of Kamalia.

== See also ==
- List of medieval universities
