= University of Kamalia =

Public university in Punjab, Pakistan

- یونیورسٹی آف کمالیہ
- Motto: Transforming Potential into Excellence
- Type: Public
- Established: August 31, 2022
- Affiliations: HEC, PHEC
- Chancellor: Governor of Punjab
- Vice-Chancellor: Yasir Nawab
- Location: Kamalia, Punjab, Pakistan; 30°43′40″N 72°39′15″E
- Campus: Toba Road, Kamalia (former Government Teachers Training School building)
- Website: ukm.edu.pk

The University of Kamalia (UKM) is a public university located in Kamalia, Toba Tek Singh District, Punjab, Pakistan.

== History ==
The university was established under the University of Kamalia Act 2022 (Act XVII of 2022). A bill for its creation was moved on the initiative of Begum Ashfa Fatyana, a member of the Provincial Assembly from Kamalia, and her husband Riaz Fatyana, a member of the National Assembly, and was passed by the Provincial Assembly on 19 August 2022. The Governor of Punjab subsequently withheld assent and raised objections to the bill as originally passed. The Assembly reconsidered and re-passed it on 31 August 2022, at which point it was deemed to have received the Governor's assent under Article 116(3) of the Constitution of Pakistan. The Act was published in the Punjab Gazette (Extraordinary) on 8 September 2022 and the university was formally incorporated as a body corporate with academic, financial, and administrative autonomy under the Government of Punjab.

For two years following its establishment, the university operated under a series of acting vice chancellors while a permanent leadership structure was developed. On 14 November 2024, the Punjab government appointed Yasir Nawab as the founding regular Vice Chancellor of the university, along with vice chancellors for five other public universities in the province, after the Governor did not act within the constitutional 15-day period for reconsidering the Chief Minister's advice.

Regular academic classes began at the university for the first time on 15 September 2025, marked by an inaugural ceremony attended by Vice Chancellor Yasir Nawab, Akhuwat Foundation chairman Amjad Saqib, and local political figures including MNA Riaz Fatyana and MPA Ashifa Riaz Fatyana.

In December 2025, the Punjab Higher Education Department directed the vice chancellors of 17 public universities in the province, including the University of Kamalia, to submit feasibility reports on taking over public sector commerce colleges in their respective regions, as part of a wider restructuring of commerce education across Punjab. The universities were given an initial one-year period to prepare academic and administrative plans, including proposed programmes and resource utilisation, for the proposed takeovers.

== Campus ==
The university initially operates from premises in a former government teachers' training school building on Toba Road in Kamalia. The Government of Punjab has allocated 45 acres of land on Mull Fatyana Road, which connects Kamalia and Sahiwal via a newly constructed bridge over the Ravi River, for the development of a permanent campus.

== Admissions ==
As of the 2023–24 academic year, the University of Kamalia had not yet implemented the two percent quota reserved for religious minorities that is mandated across public universities in Punjab, with the university citing administrative delays as it was not yet fully operational. Regular classes at the university did not begin until 15 September 2025, nearly a year after Yasir Nawab's appointment as vice chancellor; whether the minority quota has since been implemented has not been reported in reliable sources found to date.
