= Joconde (database) =

French database of museum collections

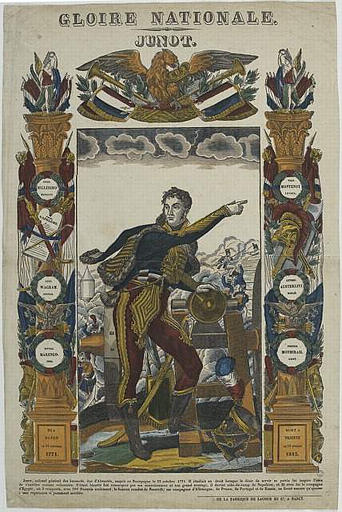
A popular print of General Junot, 19th century.

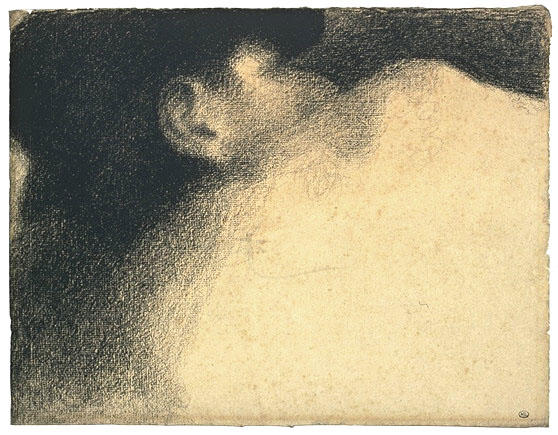
The Sleeper, drawing by Georges Seurat, one of 49 items by him. Joconde is very rich in drawings.

Joconde is the central database created in 1975 and now available online, maintained by the French Ministry of Culture, for objects in the collections of the main French public and private museums listed as Musées de France, according to article L. 441-1 of the Code du patrimoine amounting to more than 1,200 institutions.

"La Joconde" is the French name of the Mona Lisa, which like about half of the collections of the Louvre, is included in the database, as one of 295 items by, after, or connected with Leonardo da Vinci; of these, only 42 works are by Leonardo da Vinci, including 6 paintings. By November 2012, Joconde contained over 475,000 object online and over 290,000 with images, from 366 collections in France, including 209,350 drawings, 63,547 paintings, 34,561 prints, 34,102 sculptures or 16,631 costumes and their accessories and is still expanding. By June 2022 it counted 636,405 objects.

The database is not only dedicated to the information of the public but as well to the needs of the administrators and curators of the museums, thanks to the online presentation of professional tools to facilitate notably the museums collections cataloguing and state inventory (récolement). This explains the great precision of the listings. Since the museums participate on a voluntary basis to the regular enrichment of the database, some can present a large part of their collection, while others appear only because of the mere permanent deposits made by the first ones.

Live on the French Minitel system from 1992, the database went online in 1995. Originally just for objects from the fine arts and decorative arts, in 2004 Joconde was united with what had been separate databases for objects from archeology and ethnology. It comes under the "Direction des Musées de France" (DMF) section of the Ministry.

A small number of the best known objects have a prose commentary. Not all images are in colour, especially for the archaeological collections. When an object created after the mid-20th century has no image this is most often for copyright reasons. On the original database, the listing of 49 search criteria is highly structured, using a special vocabulary, which allows for very specific and accurate searches, helped as well by the index.

Since July 9, 2019, Joconde is available on the Plateforme Ouverte du Patrimoine (POP), the general database of the ministry of culture, which gathers 8 databases and offers only 9 main advanced search criteria, but 3,976,845 objects, on 25 June 2022, including 253,677 drawings, 146,620 paintings or 226,777 sculptures. The former search page of Joconde is still available, but no more updated since 19 March 2019.
