= Finiels =

Coordinates: 44°24′13″N 3°44′46″E

Finiels is a hamlet on the slopes of Mont Lozère. It has a small number of inhabitants and a chambre d'hote and other visitor accommodation. The nearest village with convenience shopping is Le Pont-de-Montvert, roughly 6 kilometres (3.7 mi) to the south. Finiels lies on the Robert Louis Stevenson Trail (GR 70), a popular long-distance path following approximately the route travelled by Robert Louis Stevenson in 1878 and described in his book Travels with a Donkey in the Cévennes. A 'Fete of the Myrtilles' (bilberries) is held every August.
