= Château de Luc =

Rined castle in Occitania, France

Coordinates: 44°39′8″N 3°53′21″E

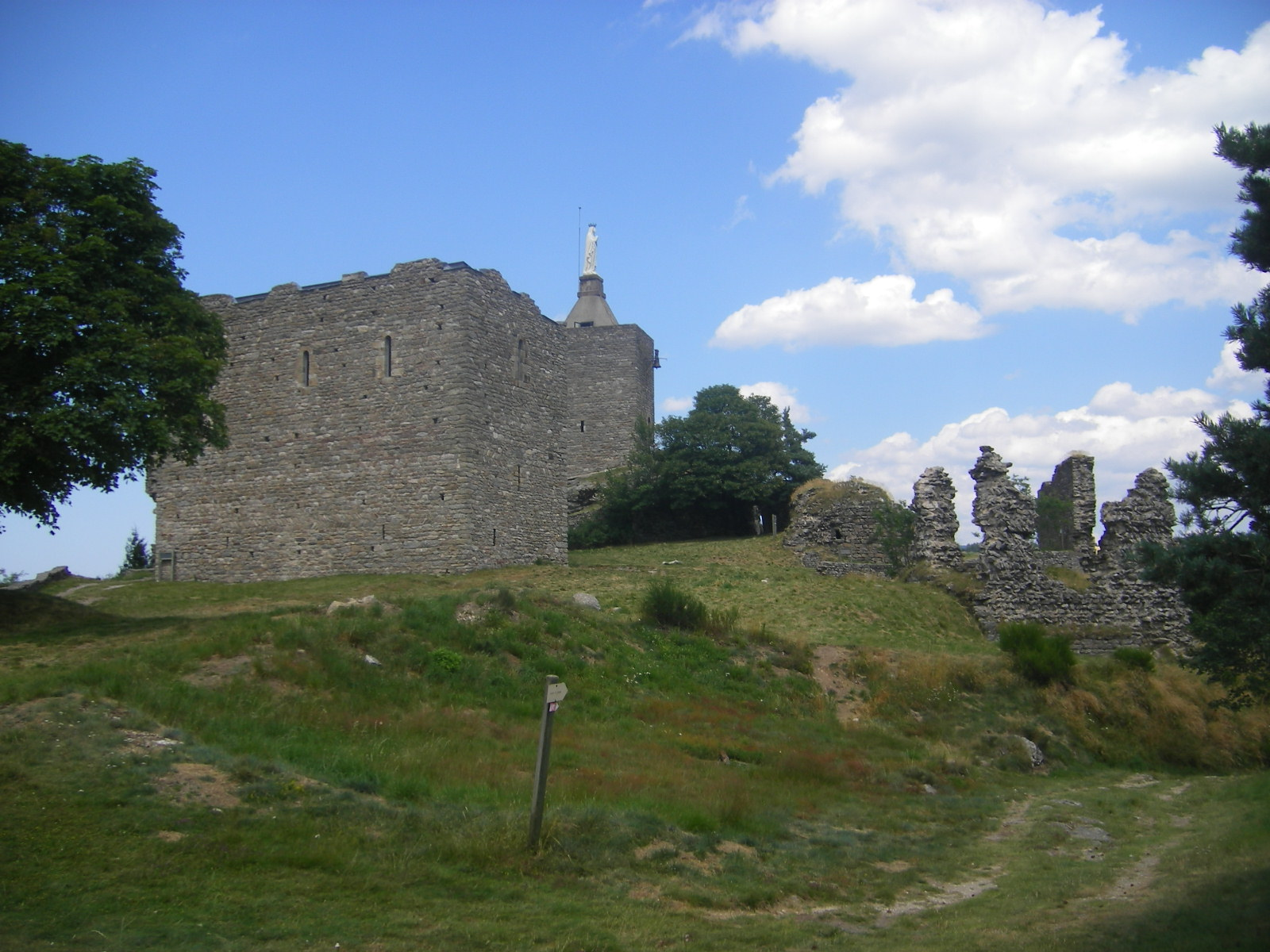
General view

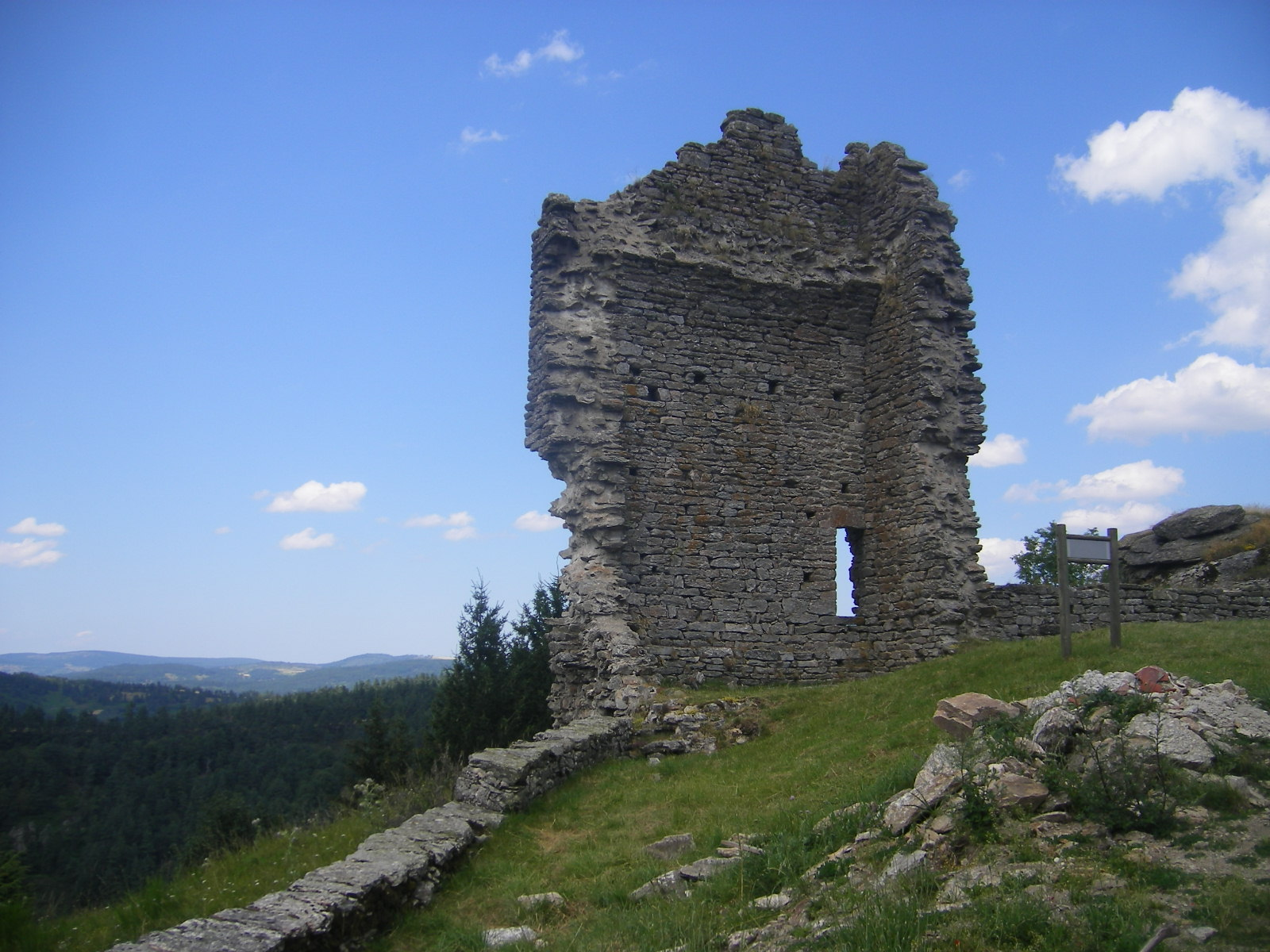
One of the ruined walls

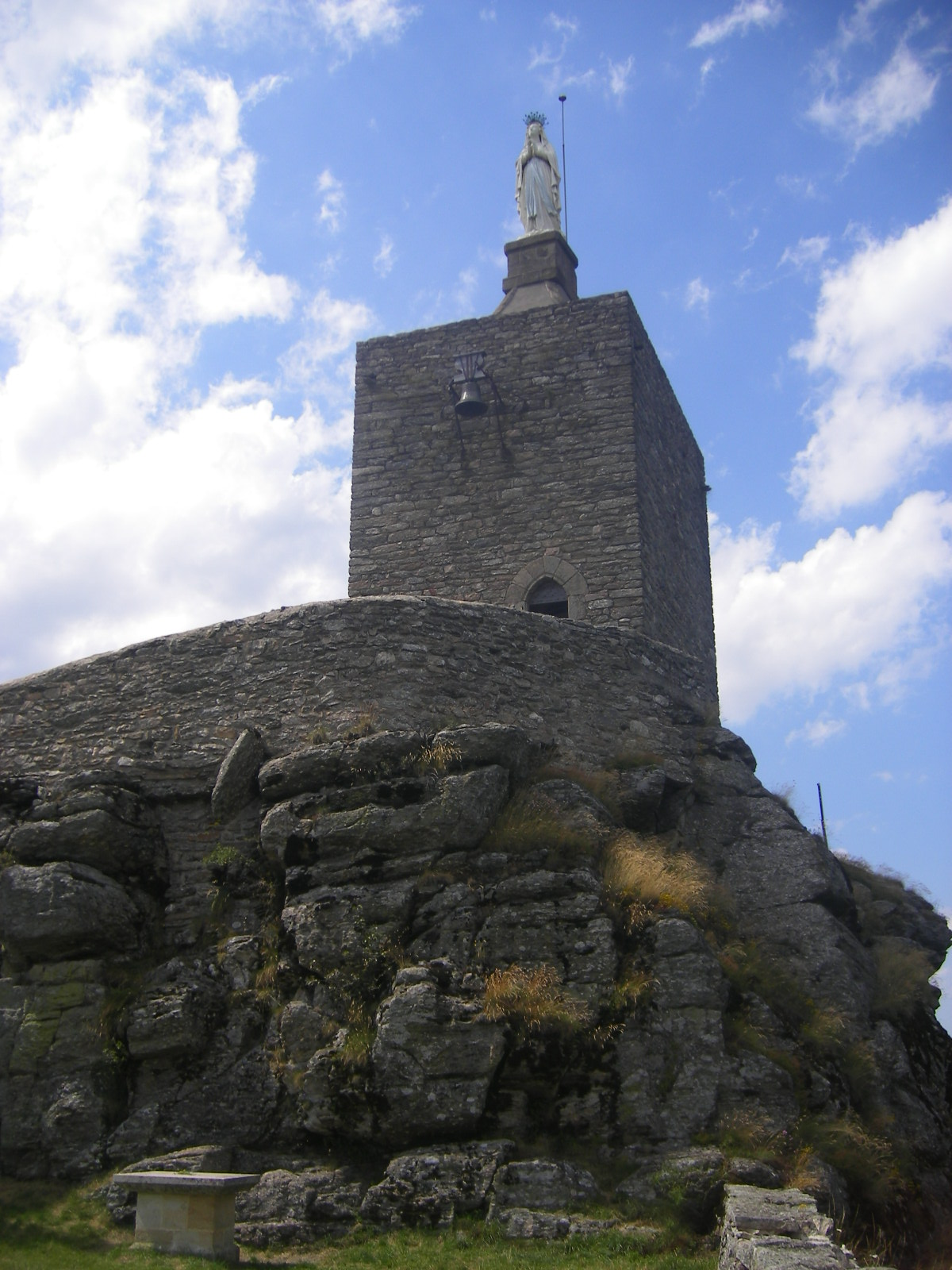
The castle has been crowned with a statue of the Virgin Mary since 1878

The Château de Luc is a ruined castle in the town of Luc in the Lozère département, in the Occitanie région of France. It was built in the 12th century on a previous Celtic site.

The castle, as a strategic point between the two provinces of Gévaudan and Vivarais, guarded a link to the south of France of the Auvergne frequently used by pilgrims of Saint Gilles, also known as the Regordane Way, on which it was a toll-gate.

For the first 100 years or so of its existence it was the home of the Luc family. In the 13th century it became the property of other regional seigneurs. During the Hundred Years' War it withstood a number of sieges. During the 16th century Wars of Religion the state of Gévaudan garrisoned the castle. Around 1630 the castle was dismantled under orders of Richelieu. During the period surrounding the French Revolution it continued to fall apart from neglect.

In 1878, local parishioners renovated the keep into a chapel, installing a shrine to the Virgin Mary. In the same year, the English writer Robert Louis Stevenson passed through on his travel-adventure, as he recorded in Travels with a Donkey in the Cévennes:

... [the hill] came to a point in the ruins of the castle of Luc, which pricked up impudently from below my feet, carrying on a pinnacle a tall white statue of Our Lady, which, I heard with interest, weighed fifty quintals, and was to be dedicated on the 6th of October ... Luc itself was a straggling double file of houses wedged between hill and river. It had no beauty, nor was there any notable feature, save the old castle overhead with its fifty quintals of brand-new Madonna.

It remains in ruins today and attracts hikers who re-trace Stevenson's route on the GR 70.

The castle is the property of the commune. It was declared a monument historique by the French Ministry of Culture in 1986.

== See also ==
- List of castles in France
