= Chaudeyrac =

- Commune
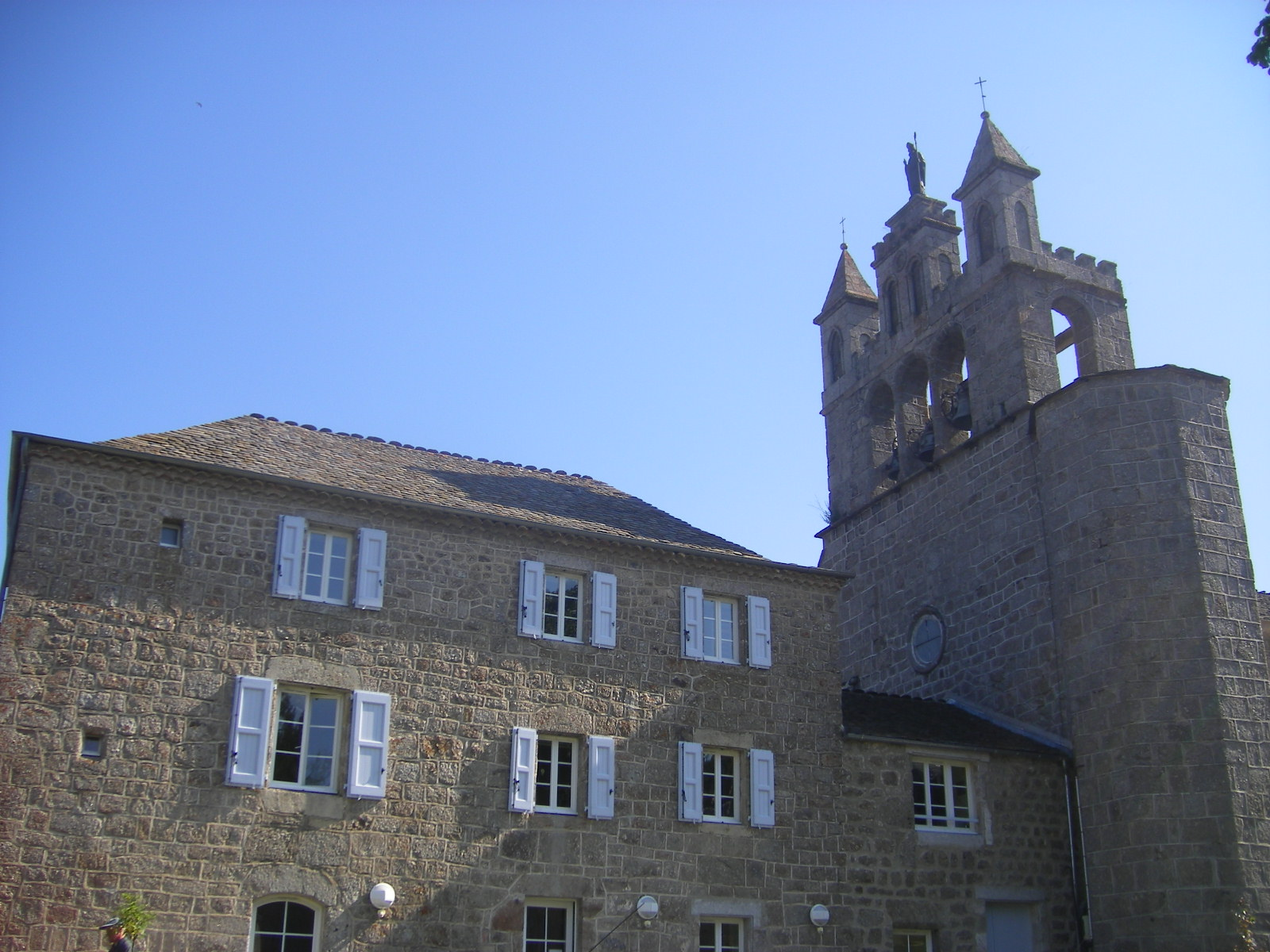
- The bell tower in Chaudeyrac

- Coat of arms
- Location of Chaudeyrac
- Location within France Location within Occitanie
- Coordinates: 44°39′37″N 3°45′26″E
- Country: France
- Region: Occitania
- Department: Lozère
- Arrondissement: Mende
- Canton: Grandrieu

Government
  - Mayor (2020–2026): Serge Romieu
- Area^{1}: 44.10 km^{2} (17.03 sq mi)
- Elevation: 1,143 m (3,750 ft)
- Highest elevation: 1,436 m (4,711 ft)
- Lowest elevation: 1,119 m (3,671 ft)
- Population (2023): 291
  - Density: 6.60/km^{2} (17.1/sq mi)
- Time zone: UTC+01:00 (CET)
  - Summer (DST): UTC+02:00 (CEST)
- INSEE/Postal code: 48045 /48170
- ^{1} French Land Register data, which excludes lakes, ponds, glaciers > 1 km^{2} (0.386 sq mi or 247 acres) and river estuaries.

Chaudeyrac (French pronunciation: [ʃodeʁak]; Occitan: Chaudairac) is a commune in the Lozère department in southern France.

The small villages of Fouzillic and Fouzillac, 300 m from each other, are located on the territory of the commune. The villages are mentioned by Robert Louis Stevenson in Travels with a Donkey in the Cévennes. He was there on September 24–25, 1878, while on his way to Cheylard-l'Évêque. He refers to the villages as "Fouzilhic" and "Fouzilhac".

== See also ==
- Communes of the Lozère department
