= Château de Beaufort =

Castle in Auvergne-Rhône-Alpes, France

Coordinates: 44°53′17″N 3°55′26″E

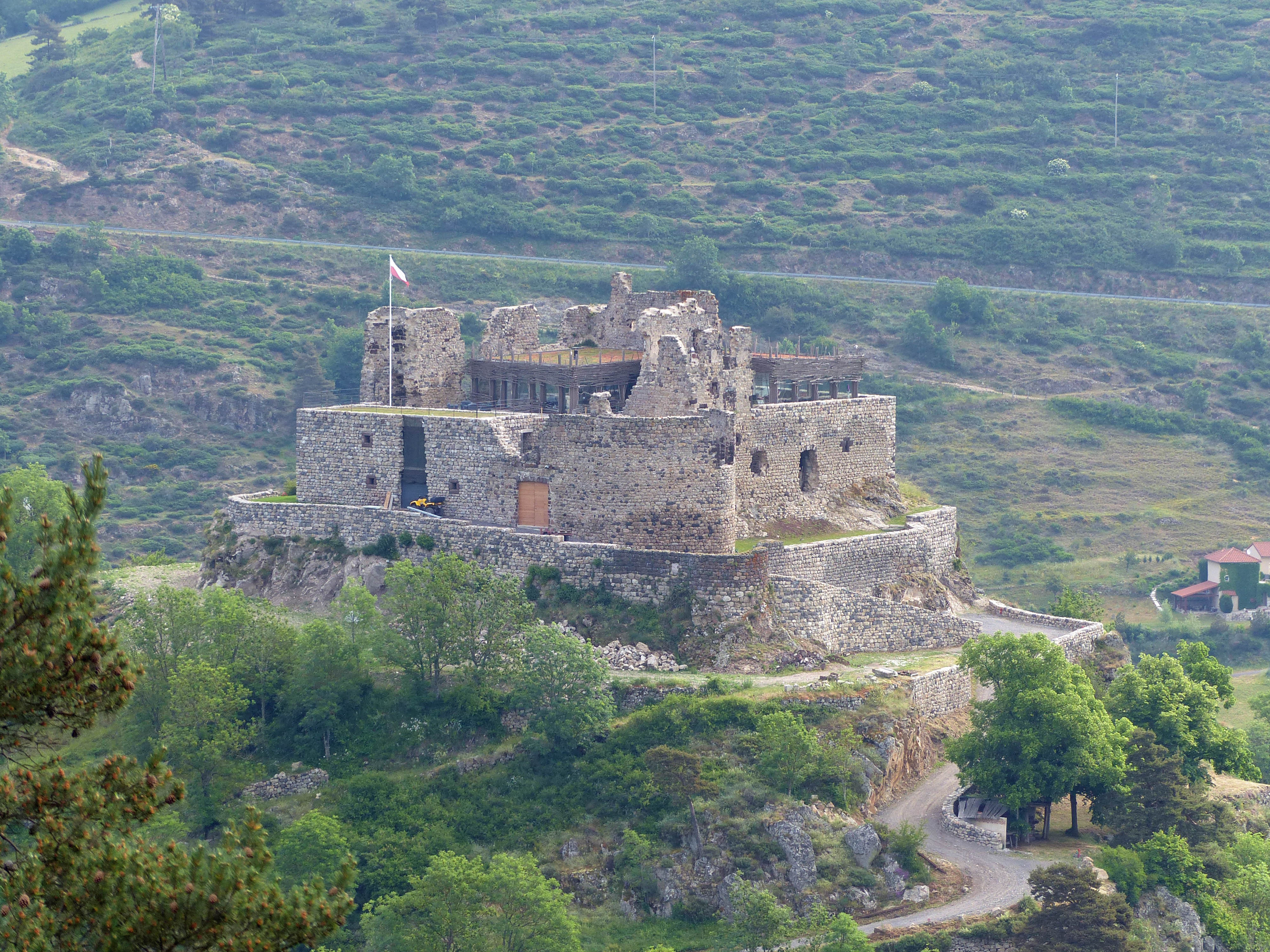
Ruin of Beaufort Castle

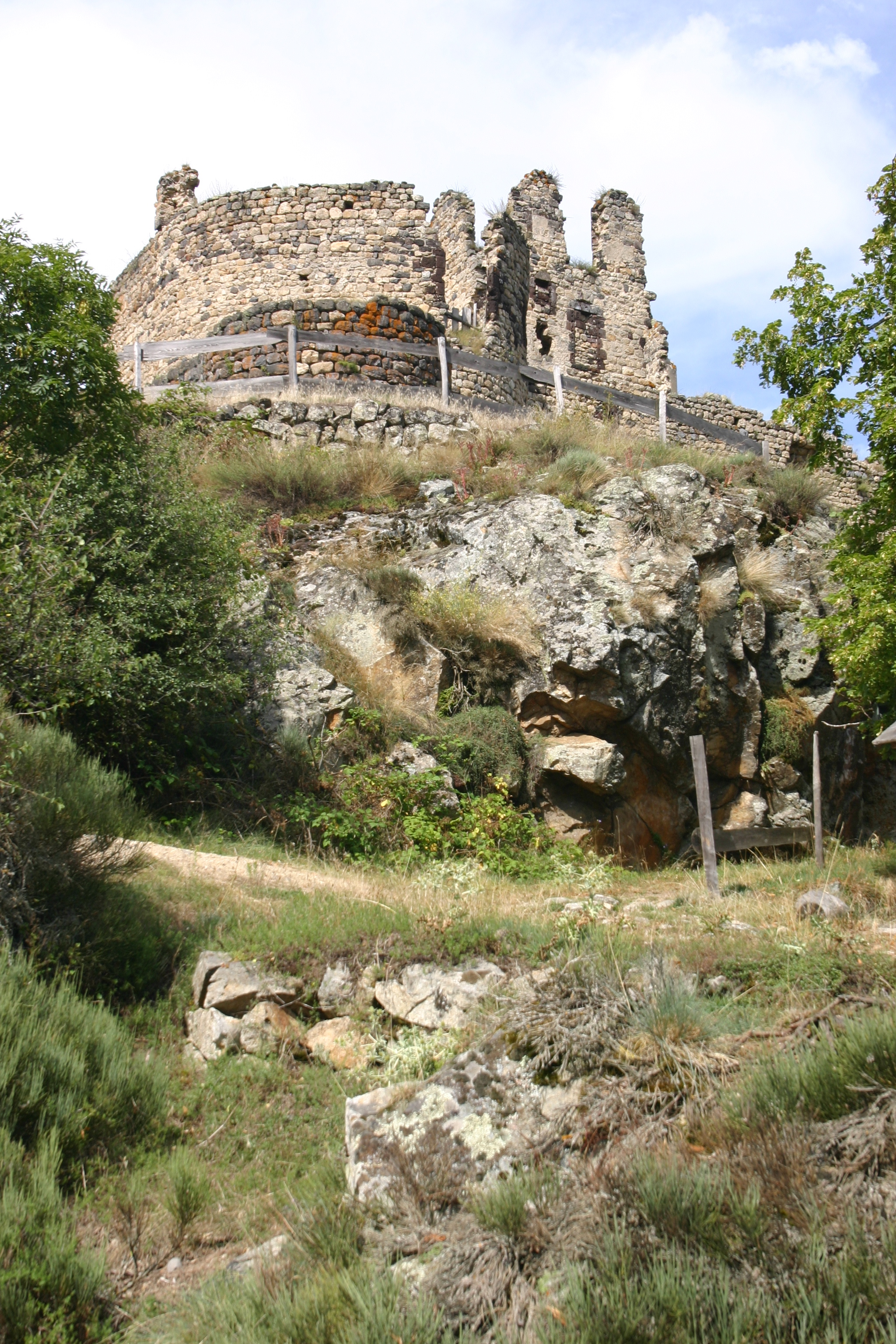
Ruin of Beaufort Castle

The Château de Beaufort is a ruined castle located along the upper reaches of the river Loire in France. It is near the village of Goudet in the département of Haute-Loire, in the Auvergne region. It was built in the 13th century and modified in the 15th and 16th centuries. Perched on a rocky headland overhanging the granitic rocks of the Margeride, the fortress is today a ruined shell.

Robert Louis Stevenson stopped here on his trip documented in Travels with a Donkey in the Cévennes (1879).

"In this pleasant humour I came down the hill to where Goudet stands in a green end of a valley, with Château Beaufort opposite upon a rocky steep, and the stream, as clear as crystal, lying in a deep pool between them."

== History ==
Built for surveillance and domination of the Loire valley, the castle provides an interesting example of how a 13th-century feudal castle could be adapted to the evolution of military construction, notable with the development of artillery. During the Hundred Years' War and the Wars of Religion it was of historical importance but after the French Revolution it fell victim to a gradual abandonment which reduced it to the state of ruin. The site includes an enceinte, partly rebuilt in the 15th century, which surrounded the fortress halfway up the hill.

The castle itself was, right from the start, of square plan with a courtyard occupied on the south by a residence. In the 16th century, Antoine de la Tour added a tower in the north-western corner, a large horseshoe-shaped tower in the south-western corner, and other walls, parts of which remain on the north and south sides, the latter with a corner tower. with turn of angle.

Inside the enceinte, the vestiges on the ground or hidden provide little help to suggest how the inhabited parts were divided. In the north-east, are remnants of an arched room and a chimney. The 15th-century tower was reinforced internally by a second wall and was pierced with holes for archers and cannons.

It has been listed since 1994 as a monument historique by the French Ministry of Culture.

== See also ==
- List of castles in France
