= Château de Grèzes =

Coordinates: 44°30′50″N 3°20′21″E

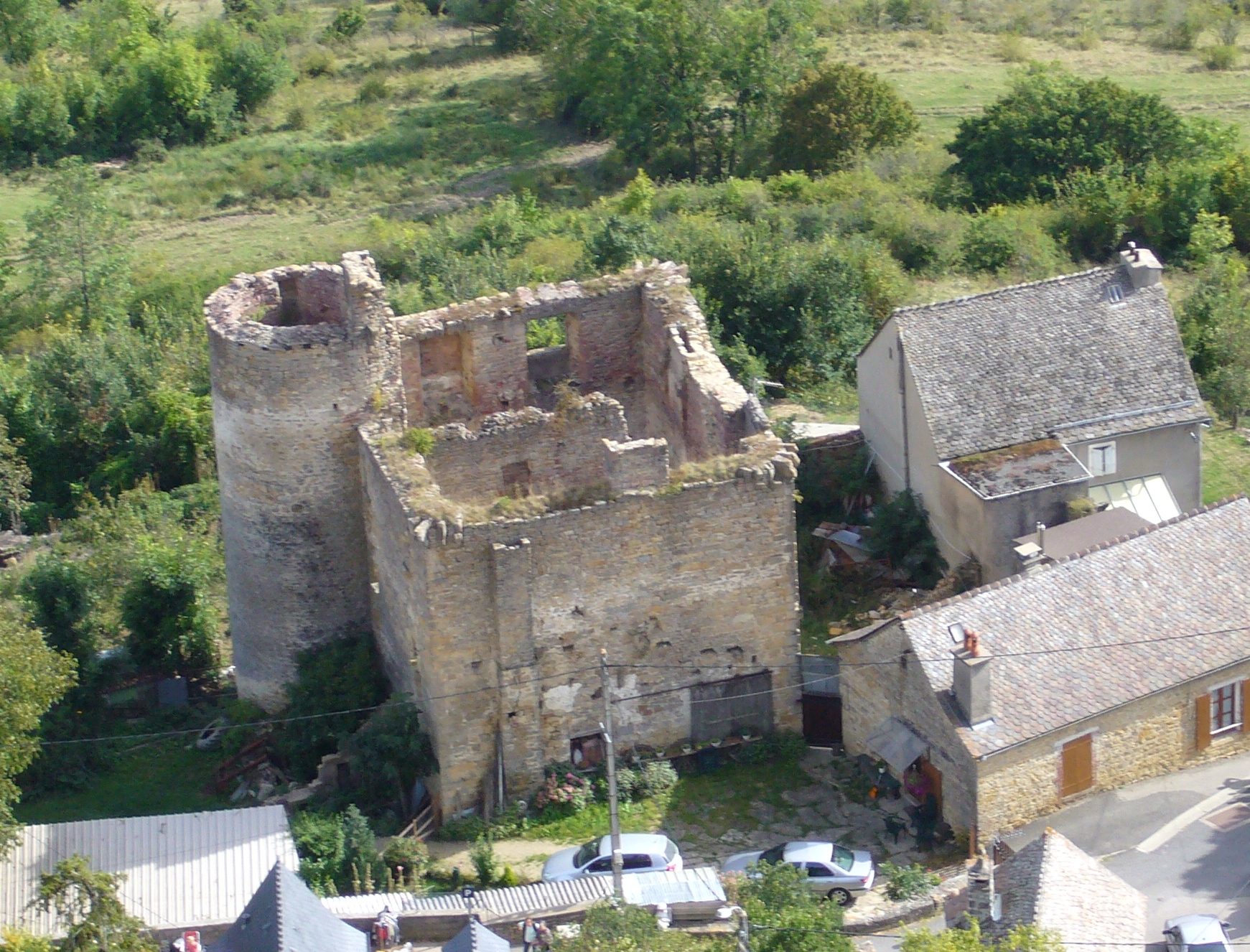
Château de Grèzes seen from the Truc de Grèzes

The Château de Grèzes is a ruined 17th century castle in the commune of Grèzes in the Lozère département of France.

== Early castle ==
Before the Roman occupation of Gaul, an oppidum had been constructed for defence on the Truc de Grèzes, a hill (1 008 m) near the present day village. During the Gallo-Roman period in Grèzes, then named Gredonense castrum, a fortress came to replace the oppidum. Below this, on the site of the present village, the village of Gredone was built during a period of peace. After the Romans had left, the hill remained a strong point; the castle was enlarged over the course of the years.

The castle witnessed the Hundred Years' War though the reinforcement of its walls did not prevent the English from seizing the town. It was only after the victories of troops led by Bertrand du Guesclin over Astorg de Peyre, one of the Barons of Gévaudan and the liberation of Apcher and Randon, that Grèzes recovered its freedom, though much weakened.

Later, the Wars of Religion shook the region. Grèzes was one of many villages pillaged by the Huguenot captain, Matthieu Merle, at the behest of the widow of Astorg de Peyre, seeking vengeance against the Catholics. (It was her husband's death in the St. Bartholomew's Day massacre which started the war in Gévaudan.) A strategic point, Grèzes was occupied for seven years by Merle's troops. The fortress was destroyed in 1576 in order to drive them out. However, this did not prevent them capturing Mende on Christmas night in 1579.

Around 1632, King Louis XIII ordered the dismantling of the castles at Luc, Grèzes and Châteauneuf-de-Randon.

== Later castle ==
The castle visible in the village today is not the one that made the name of Grèzes. It was only built after the destruction of the earlier castle, on the orders of Cardinal Richelieu, and thus dates from the 17th century. It consists of a four storeyed, heavy, square building, with a tower attached. This is the only tower remaining; others were destroyed in the wars of religion at the start of the 18th century.

== See also ==
- List of castles in France
