= Saint-Flour (disambiguation) =

Saint-Flour is a town in the Cantal département, France.

Saint-Flour may also refer to:

- Saint-Flour-de-Mercoire, in the Lozère département
- Saint-Flour-l'Étang, in the Puy-de-Dôme département
- Roman Catholic Diocese of Saint-Flour
