= Rocles =

Rocles is the name of several communes in France:

- Rocles, in the Allier department
- Rocles, in the Ardèche department
- Rocles, in the Lozère department
