= Canton of Langogne =

Coordinates: 44.73°N 3.86°E

The canton of Langogne is an administrative division of the Lozère department, southern France. Its borders were modified at the French canton reorganisation which came into effect in March 2015. Its seat is in Langogne.

It consists of the following communes:

1. Auroux
2. Chastanier
3. Cheylard-l'Évêque
4. Naussac-Fontanes
5. Langogne
6. Luc
7. Rocles
8. Saint-Bonnet-Laval
9. Saint-Flour-de-Mercoire
