= Saint-Laurent-les-Bains-Laval-d'Aurelle =

- Commune
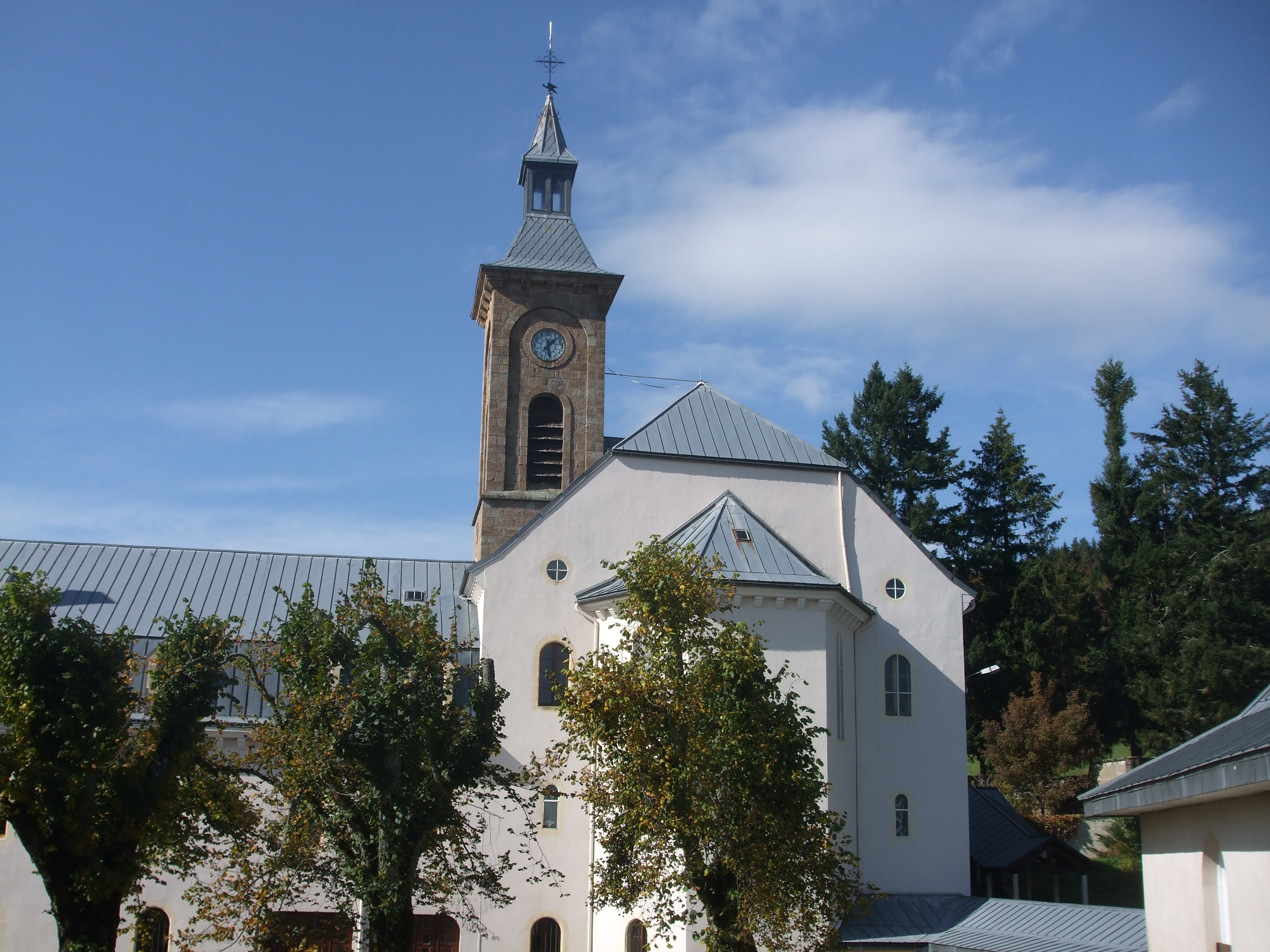
- Location of Saint-Laurent-les-Bains-Laval-d'Aurelle
- Location within France Location within Auvergne-Rhône-Alpes
- Coordinates: 44°36′26″N 3°58′14″E
- Country: France
- Region: Auvergne-Rhône-Alpes
- Department: Ardèche
- Arrondissement: Largentière
- Canton: Haute-Ardèche
- Intercommunality: Montagne d'Ardèche

Government
  - Mayor (2020–2026): Émile Louche
- Area^{1}: 35.48 km^{2} (13.70 sq mi)
- Highest elevation: 1,379 m (4,524 ft)
- Lowest elevation: 600 m (2,000 ft)
- Population (2023): 183
  - Density: 5.16/km^{2} (13.4/sq mi)
- Time zone: UTC+01:00 (CET)
  - Summer (DST): UTC+02:00 (CEST)
- INSEE/Postal code: 07262 /07590
- ^{1} French Land Register data, which excludes lakes, ponds, glaciers > 1 km^{2} (0.386 sq mi or 247 acres) and river estuaries.

Saint-Laurent-les-Bains-Laval-d'Aurelle (French pronunciation: [sɛ̃ lɔʁɑ̃ le bɛ̃ laval doʁɛl]; Occitan: Sant Laurenç daus Banhs e L'Aval d'Aurèla) is a commune in the Ardèche department in southern France. The municipality was established on 1 January 2019 by merger of the former communes of Saint-Laurent-les-Bains and Laval-d'Aurelle.

== Politics and administration ==
=== List of mayors ===
List of successive mayors of Saint-Laurent-les-Bains-Laval-d'Aurelle
In office		Name	Party	Capacity	Ref.
1 January 2019	Present	Émile Louche			

== See also ==
- Communes of the Ardèche department
