= Saint-Germain-de-Calberte =

- Commune
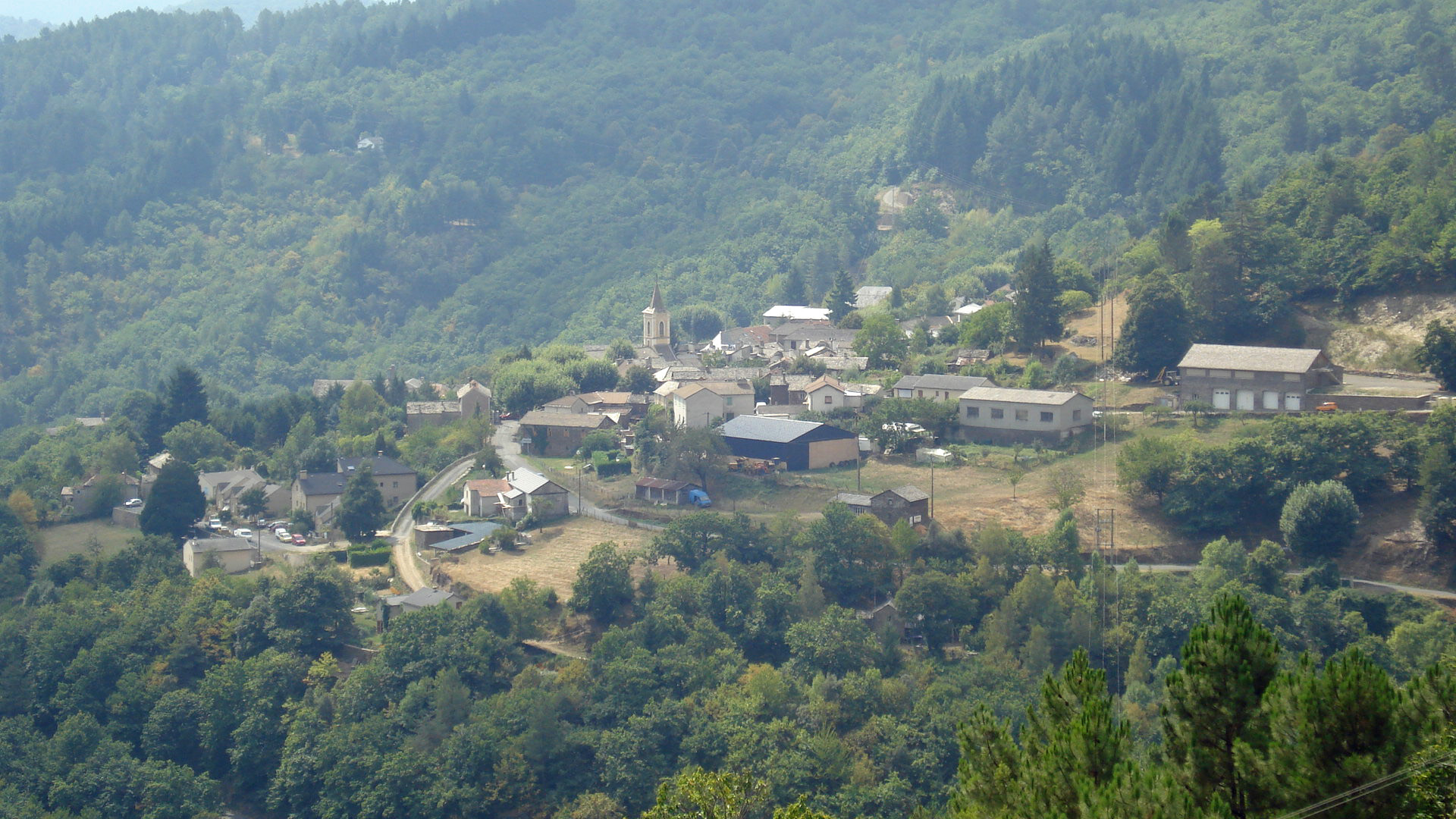
- The village of Saint-Germain-de-Calberte, seen from the west

- Coat of arms
- Location of Saint-Germain-de-Calberte
- Location within France Location within Occitanie
- Coordinates: 44°13′04″N 3°48′34″E
- Country: France
- Region: Occitania
- Department: Lozère
- Arrondissement: Florac
- Canton: Le Collet-de-Dèze

Government
  - Mayor (2023–2026): Coralie Atek
- Area^{1}: 38.60 km^{2} (14.90 sq mi)
- Elevation: 500 m (1,600 ft)
- Highest elevation: 1,147 m (3,763 ft)
- Lowest elevation: 275 m (902 ft)
- Population (2023): 456
  - Density: 11.8/km^{2} (30.6/sq mi)
- Time zone: UTC+01:00 (CET)
  - Summer (DST): UTC+02:00 (CEST)
- INSEE/Postal code: 48155 /48370
- ^{1} French Land Register data, which excludes lakes, ponds, glaciers > 1 km^{2} (0.386 sq mi or 247 acres) and river estuaries.

Saint-Germain-de-Calberte (French pronunciation: [sɛ̃ ʒɛʁmɛ̃ də kalbɛʁt]; Occitan: Sent German de Calbèrta) is a commune in the Lozère department in southern France.

The Scottish author Robert Louis Stevenson stayed at an inn in the village on the night of 1 October 1878, as recounted in his book Travels with a Donkey in the Cévennes:

At a certain point, as I went downward, turning many acute angles, the moon disappeared behind the hill; and I pursued my way in great darkness, until another turning shot me without preparation into St. Germain de Calberte. The place was asleep and silent, and buried in opaque night. Only from a single open door, some lamplight escaped upon the road to show me I was come among men's habitations. The two last gossips of the evening, still talking by a garden wall, directed me to the inn. The landlady was getting her chicks to bed; the fire was already out, and had, not without grumbling, to be rekindled; half an hour later, and I must have gone supperless to roost.

The Robert Louis Stevenson Trail (GR 70), a popular long-distance path following Stevenson's approximate route, runs through the village.

== See also ==
- Communes of the Lozère department
