= Saint-Laurent-les-Bains =

Commune in Ardèche, France

- Part of Saint-Laurent-les-Bains-Laval-d'Aurelle
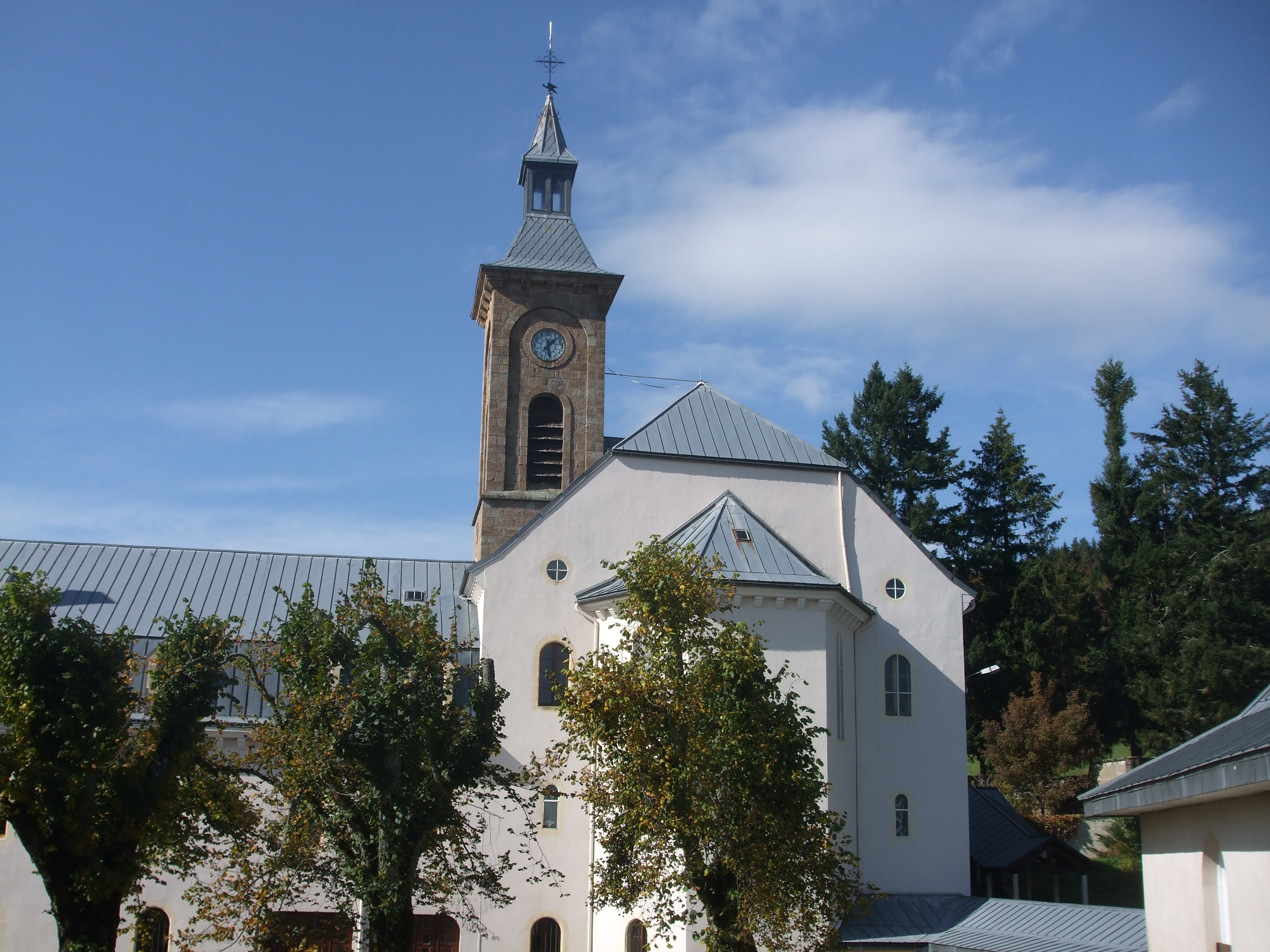
- The abbey church in Saint-Laurent-les-Bains

- Coat of arms
- Location of Saint-Laurent-les-Bains
- Location within France Location within Auvergne-Rhône-Alpes
- Coordinates: 44°36′26″N 3°58′14″E
- Country: France
- Region: Auvergne-Rhône-Alpes
- Department: Ardèche
- Arrondissement: Largentière
- Canton: Haute-Ardèche
- Commune: Saint-Laurent-les-Bains-Laval-d'Aurelle
- Area^{1}: 26.76 km^{2} (10.33 sq mi)
- Elevation: 840 m (2,760 ft)
- Highest elevation: 1,379 m (4,524 ft)
- Lowest elevation: 623 m (2,044 ft)
- Population (2023): 154
  - Density: 5.75/km^{2} (14.9/sq mi)
- Time zone: UTC+01:00 (CET)
  - Summer (DST): UTC+02:00 (CEST)
- Postal code: 07590
- ^{1} French Land Register data, which excludes lakes, ponds, glaciers > 1 km^{2} (0.386 sq mi or 247 acres) and river estuaries.

Saint-Laurent-les-Bains (French pronunciation: [sɛ̃ lɔʁɑ̃ le bɛ̃]; Auvergnat: Sant Laurenç daus Banhs) is a former commune in the Ardèche department in southern France. On 1 January 2019, it was merged into the new commune Saint-Laurent-les-Bains-Laval-d'Aurelle.

== See also ==
- Our Lady of the Snows (Trappist monastery)
- Communes of the Ardèche department
