= La Bastide-Puylaurent =

- Commune
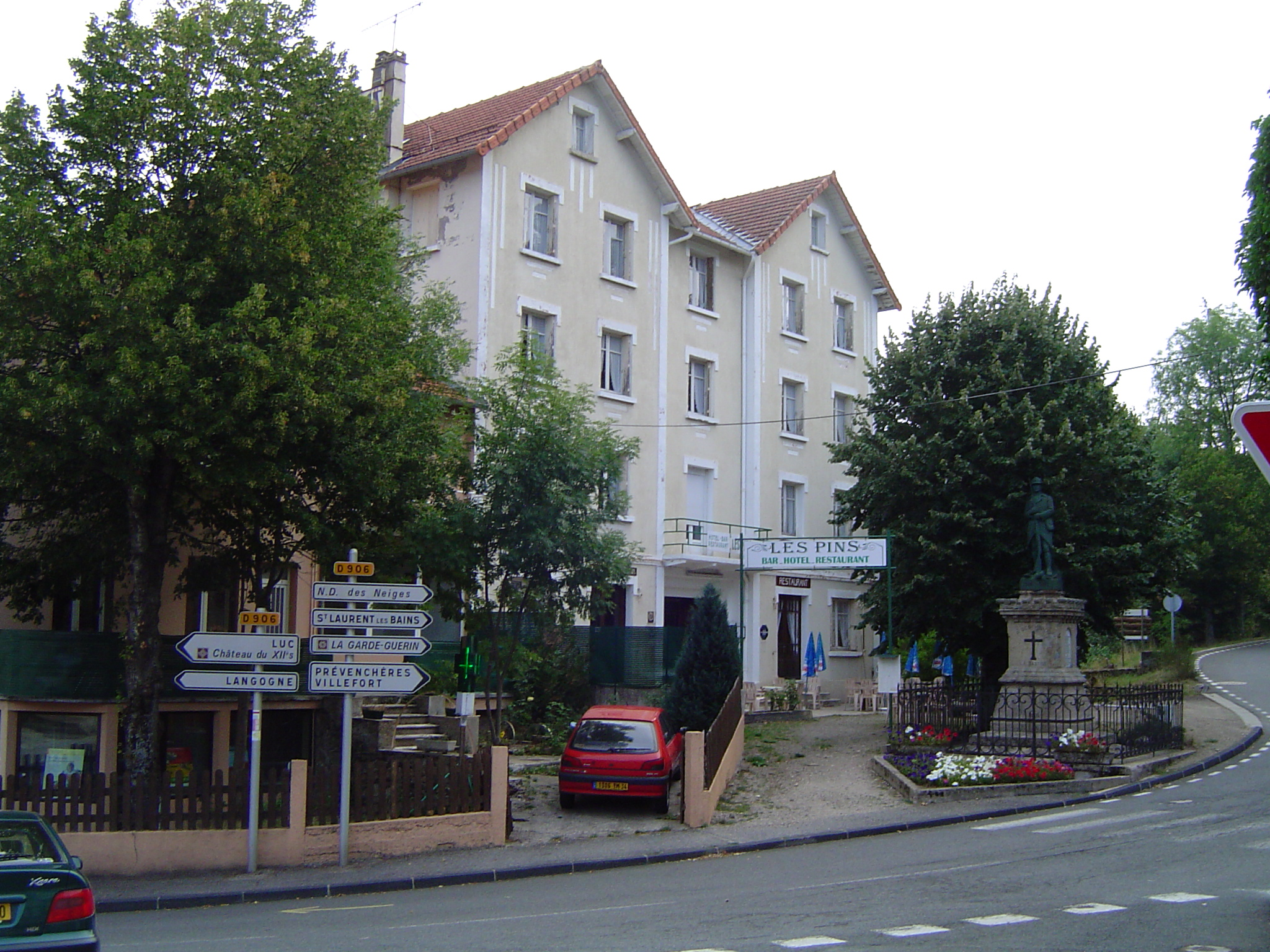
- The war memorial outside the Les Pins Hotel, in La Bastide-Puylaurent

- Coat of arms
- Location of La Bastide-Puylaurent
- Location within France Location within Occitanie
- Coordinates: 44°35′36″N 3°54′22″E
- Country: France
- Region: Occitania
- Department: Lozère
- Arrondissement: Mende
- Canton: Saint-Étienne-du-Valdonnez

Government
  - Mayor (2020–2026): Michel Teissier
- Area^{1}: 24.19 km^{2} (9.34 sq mi)
- Elevation: 1,024 m (3,360 ft)
- Highest elevation: 1,328 m (4,357 ft)
- Lowest elevation: 751 m (2,464 ft)
- Population (2023): 167
  - Density: 6.90/km^{2} (17.9/sq mi)
- Time zone: UTC+01:00 (CET)
  - Summer (DST): UTC+02:00 (CEST)
- INSEE/Postal code: 48021 /48250
- ^{1} French Land Register data, which excludes lakes, ponds, glaciers > 1 km^{2} (0.386 sq mi or 247 acres) and river estuaries.

La Bastide-Puylaurent (French pronunciation: [la bastid pɥiloʁɑ̃]; Occitan: Puèglaurenç) is a commune in the southern French department of Lozère.

The Trappist monastery Notre-Dame-des-Neiges (Our Lady of the Snows), visited by Robert Louis Stevenson in 1878 and described in his book Travels with a Donkey in the Cévennes, is about one and a half miles east of the village, in the department of Ardèche. The Robert Louis Stevenson Trail (GR 70), a popular long-distance path approximately following Stevenson's journey, runs through the village.

== Geography ==
The Chassezac forms part of the commune's southwestern border.

The town lies in the northern part of the commune, where it is crossed by the Allier, which flows northeast through the northern part of the commune.

== Population ==
Historical population
| Year | Pop. | ±% p.a. |
|---|---|---|
| 1968 | 242 | — |
| 1975 | 191 | −3.32% |
| 1982 | 176 | −1.16% |
| 1990 | 183 | +0.49% |
| 1999 | 157 | −1.69% |
| 2007 | 172 | +1.15% |
| 2012 | 177 | +0.57% |
| 2017 | 157 | −2.37% |
| 2023 | 167 | +1.03% |
Source: INSEE

== See also ==
- Communes of the Lozère department
