= GR 70 =

Long-distance footpath in France

Coordinates: 44.9397°N 3.9961°E

GR70
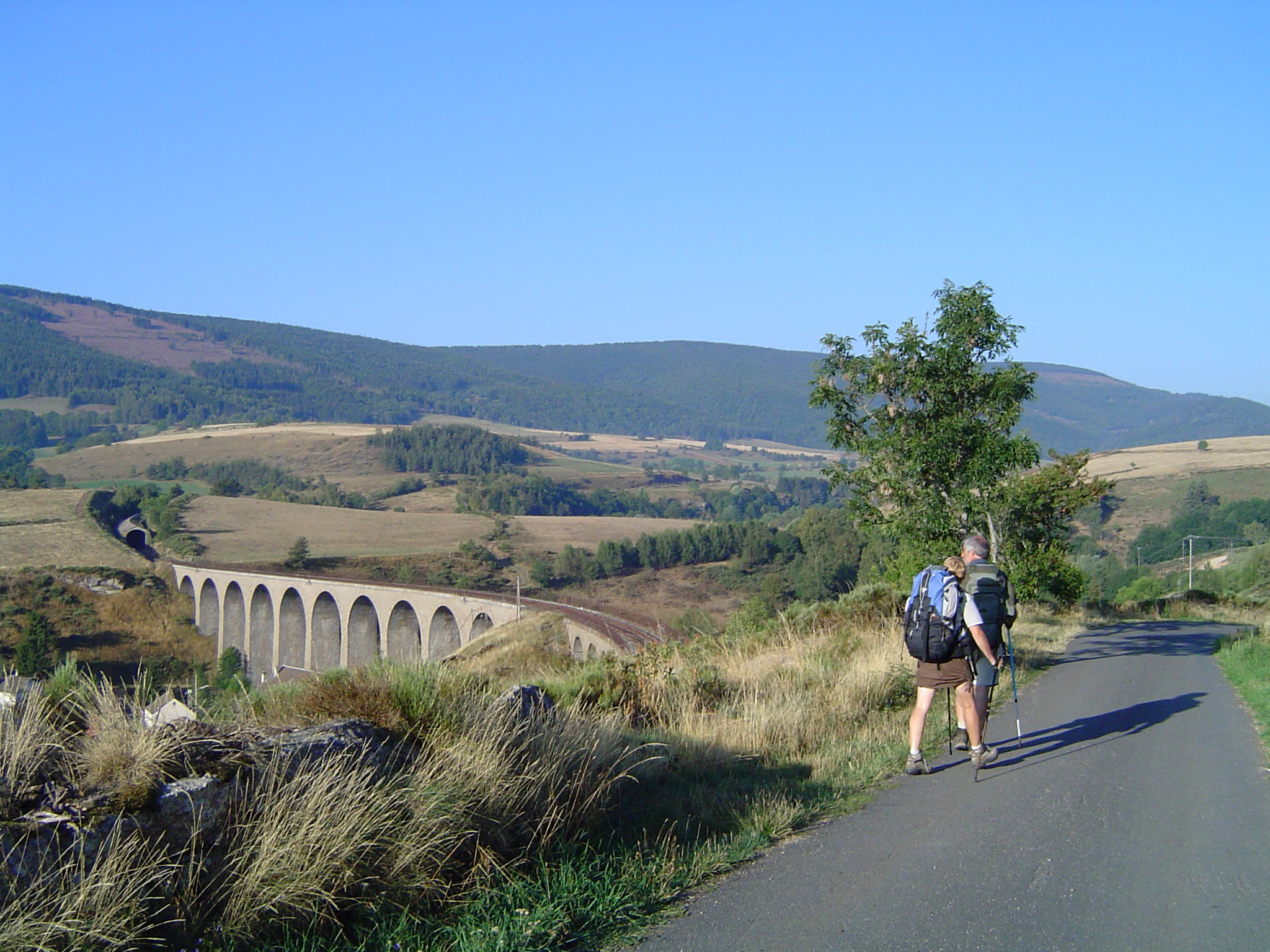
- The GR70 approaching the Viaduc du Mirandol near Chasseradès
- Length: 276 km (171 mi)
- Location: France
- Designation: GR footpath
- Trailheads: Le Monastier-sur-Gazeille, Saint-Jean-du-Gard
- Use: Hiking
- Highest point: 1,697 m (5,568 ft), Mont Lozère
- Website: www.chemin-stevenson.org/en/

The GR 70, also known as the Chemin de Stevenson or the Robert Louis Stevenson Trail, is a Grande Randonnée (long-distance footpath) that runs for approximately 225 kilometres (140 mi) through the French departments of Haute-Loire, Lozère and Gard in a generally north–south direction from Le Monastier-sur-Gazeille to Saint-Jean-du-Gard. It follows approximately the route taken by Robert Louis Stevenson in 1878, a journey described in his book Travels with a Donkey in the Cévennes.

Although it is not on the formal route, many hikers begin at Le-Puy-en-Velay and walk to Le Monastier-sur-Gazeille via a section of the GR 430. Similarly, many walkers continue beyond the official end-point of Saint-Jean-du-Gard to Alès via sections of the GR 61 and GR 44 D. Both of these cities have railway stations.

The route was formally adopted by the Fédération Française de la Randonnée Pédestre (French Hiking Federation) in 1994, and by 2007 an estimated 6000 hikers walked its full length each year. A dedicated organisation, the Association Sur Le Chemin de Robert Louis Stevenson, promotes the trail and maintains an accommodation list.

== Route ==
Places marked with an asterisk are not on the formal route, but are often included by those walking the GR 70.

- Le-Puy-en-Velay*
- Coubon*
- Le Monastier-sur-Gazeille
- Saint-Martin-de-Fugères
- Goudet
- Le Bouchet-Saint-Nicolas
- Landos
- Pradelles
- Langogne
- Saint-Flour-de-Mercoire
- Cheylard-l'Évêque
- Luc
- Laveyrune
- Abbaye Notre-Dame-des-Neiges*
- La Bastide-Puylaurent
- Chasseradès
- Le Bleymard
- Mont Lozère
- Finiels
- Le Pont-de-Montvert
- Florac
- Saint-Julien-d'Arpaon
- Cassagnas
- Saint-Germain-de-Calberte
- Saint-Étienne-Vallée-Française
- Saint-Jean-du-Gard
- Mialet*
- Alès*

== Trivia ==
The trail and Stevenson's journey are central to the plot of the movie My Donkey, My Lover & I.
