= Le Monastier-sur-Gazeille =

- Commune
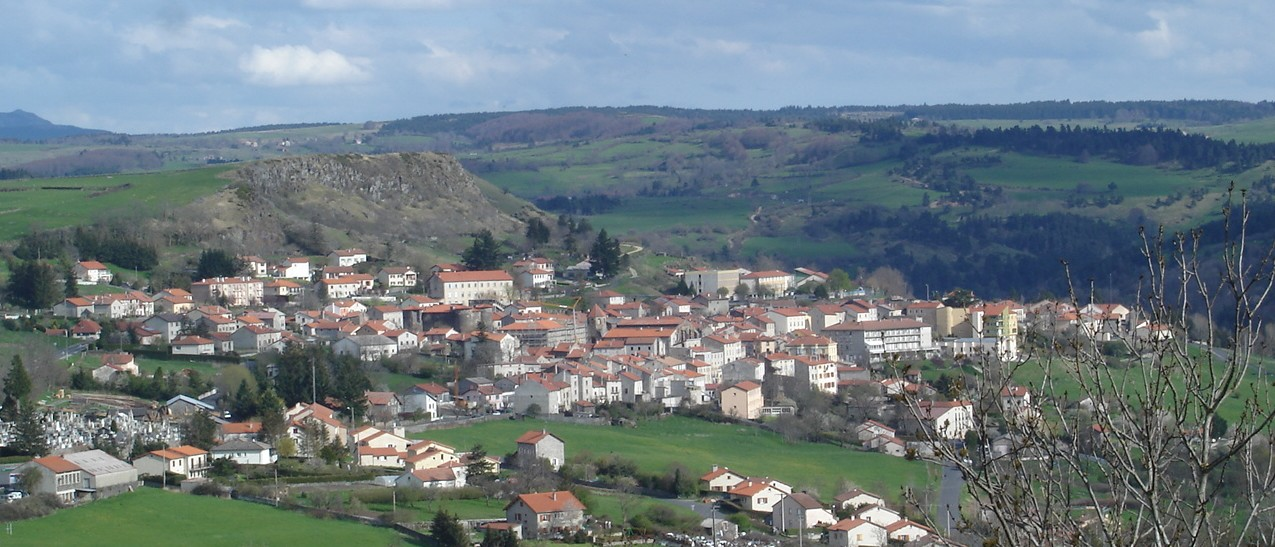

- Coat of arms
- Location of Le Monastier-sur-Gazeille
- Location within France Location within Auvergne-Rhône-Alpes
- Coordinates: 44°56′23″N 3°59′46″E
- Country: France
- Region: Auvergne-Rhône-Alpes
- Department: Haute-Loire
- Arrondissement: Le Puy-en-Velay
- Canton: Mézenc

Government
  - Mayor (2020–2026): Michel Arcis
- Area^{1}: 39.39 km^{2} (15.21 sq mi)
- Elevation: 950 m (3,120 ft)
- Highest elevation: 1,283 m (4,209 ft)
- Lowest elevation: 752 m (2,467 ft)
- Population (2023): 1,784
  - Density: 45.29/km^{2} (117.3/sq mi)
- Time zone: UTC+01:00 (CET)
  - Summer (DST): UTC+02:00 (CEST)
- INSEE/Postal code: 43135 /43150
- ^{1} French Land Register data, which excludes lakes, ponds, glaciers > 1 km^{2} (0.386 sq mi or 247 acres) and river estuaries.

Le Monastier-sur-Gazeille (French pronunciation: [lə mɔnastje syʁ ɡazɛj]; Occitan: Lo Monestier de Gaselha) is a commune in the Haute-Loire department in south-central France.

== Population ==
Historical population
Year	Pop.	±% p.a.
1968	2,085	—
1975	1,966	−0.84%
1982	1,911	−0.40%
1990	1,828	−0.55%
1999	1,734	−0.58%
2007	1,738	+0.03%
2012	1,777	+0.44%
2017	1,789	+0.13%
2023	1,784	−0.05%
Source: INSEE

== Sights ==
The official start of the Robert Louis Stevenson Trail (GR 70), a popular long-distance path, is at Place de la Poste in the centre of the village, marked by a plaque. Stevenson spent about a month in Le Monastier before setting off on his travels, as recounted in Travels with a Donkey in the Cévennes.

== See also ==
- Communes of the Haute-Loire department
