= Laval-d'Aurelle =

Commune in Ardèche, France

- Part of Saint-Laurent-les-Bains-Laval-d'Aurelle
- Location of Laval-d'Aurelle
- Location within France Location within Auvergne-Rhône-Alpes
- Coordinates: 44°33′56″N 3°57′41″E
- Country: France
- Region: Auvergne-Rhône-Alpes
- Department: Ardèche
- Arrondissement: Largentière
- Canton: Haute-Ardèche
- Commune: Saint-Laurent-les-Bains-Laval-d'Aurelle
- Area^{1}: 8.72 km^{2} (3.37 sq mi)
- Elevation: 600 m (2,000 ft)
- Highest elevation: 1,180 m (3,870 ft)
- Lowest elevation: 600 m (2,000 ft)
- Population (2021): 28
  - Density: 3.2/km^{2} (8.3/sq mi)
- Time zone: UTC+01:00 (CET)
  - Summer (DST): UTC+02:00 (CEST)
- Postal code: 07590
- ^{1} French Land Register data, which excludes lakes, ponds, glaciers > 1 km^{2} (0.386 sq mi or 247 acres) and river estuaries.

Laval-d'Aurelle (French pronunciation: [laval doʁɛl]; Auvergnat: L'Aval d'Aurèla) is a former commune in the Ardèche department in southern France. On 1 January 2019, it was merged into the new commune Saint-Laurent-les-Bains-Laval-d'Aurelle.

== See also ==
- Communes of the Ardèche department
