= Sommet de Finiels =

Mountain in France

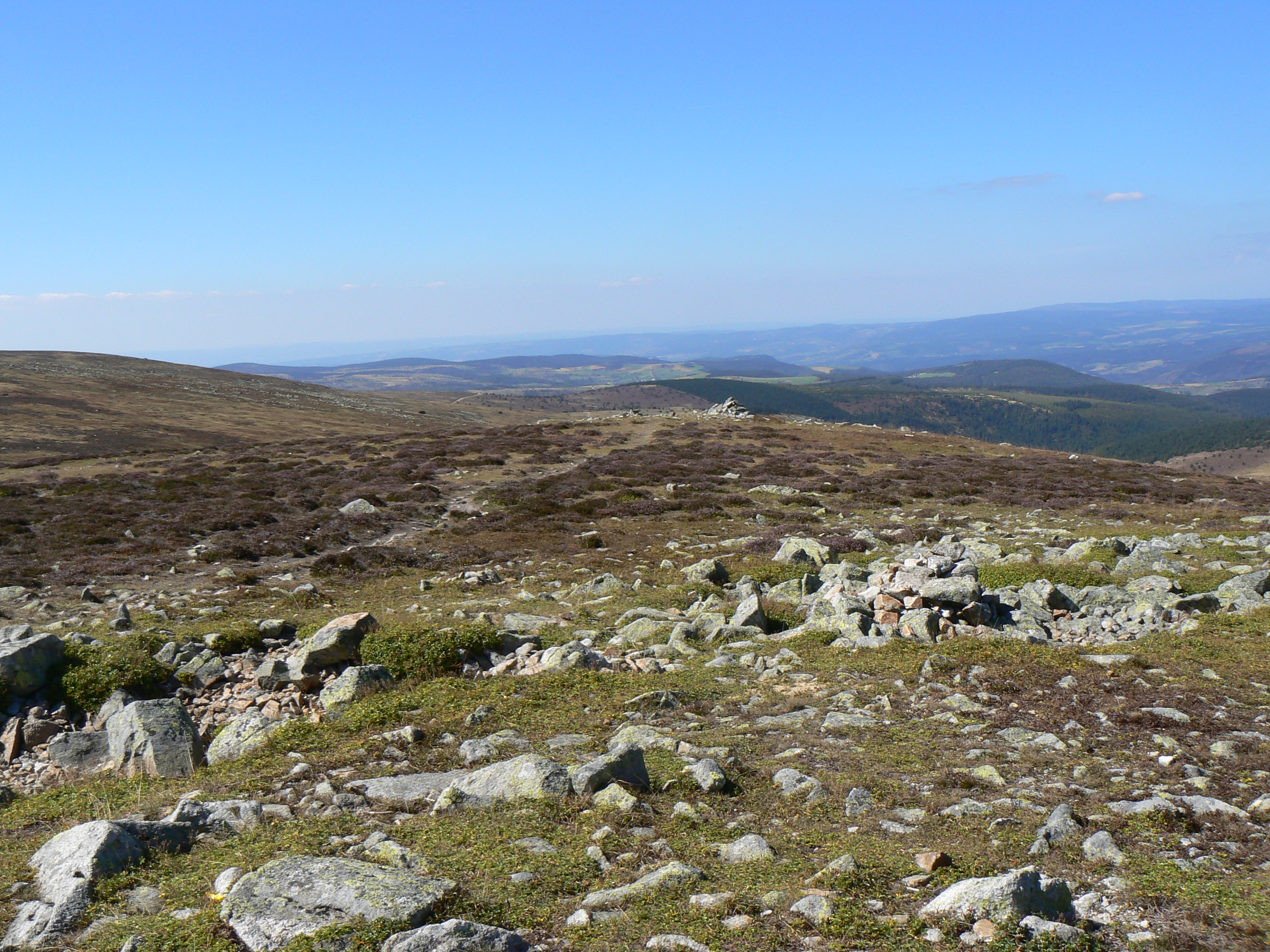
- View from the Sommet de Finiels.

Highest point
- Elevation: 1,699 m (5,574 ft)
- Coordinates: 44°25′34″N 3°44′21″E

Geography
- Location within France
- Location: Lozère, France
- Parent range: Mont Lozère (Massif Central)

The Sommet de Finiels (Occitan: Cim de Finiels) (1,699 m) is the highest point of Mont Lozère, a mountain range extending from Florac to Villefort in an east–west direction, and from Bleymard to Pont-de-Monvert in a north–south direction.

== Geography ==
In the Cévennes National Park, it is also the highest point in Lozère and the Cévennes, surpassing Mont Aigoual (1,565 m), which is located on the Gard-Lozère border.

The position and altitude of this point allow for views of the Alps to the east, the Mediterranean Sea to the south, and Plomb du Cantal to the northwest on very clear days.

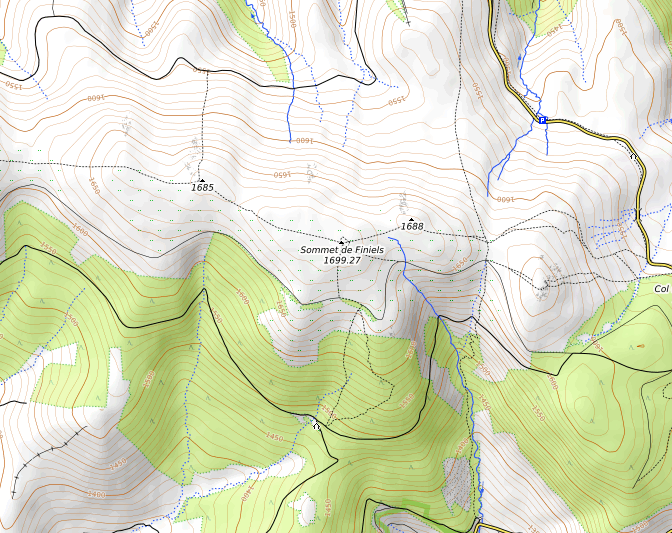
Topographic map
