= Pradelles, Haute-Loire =

Pradelles
- Commune
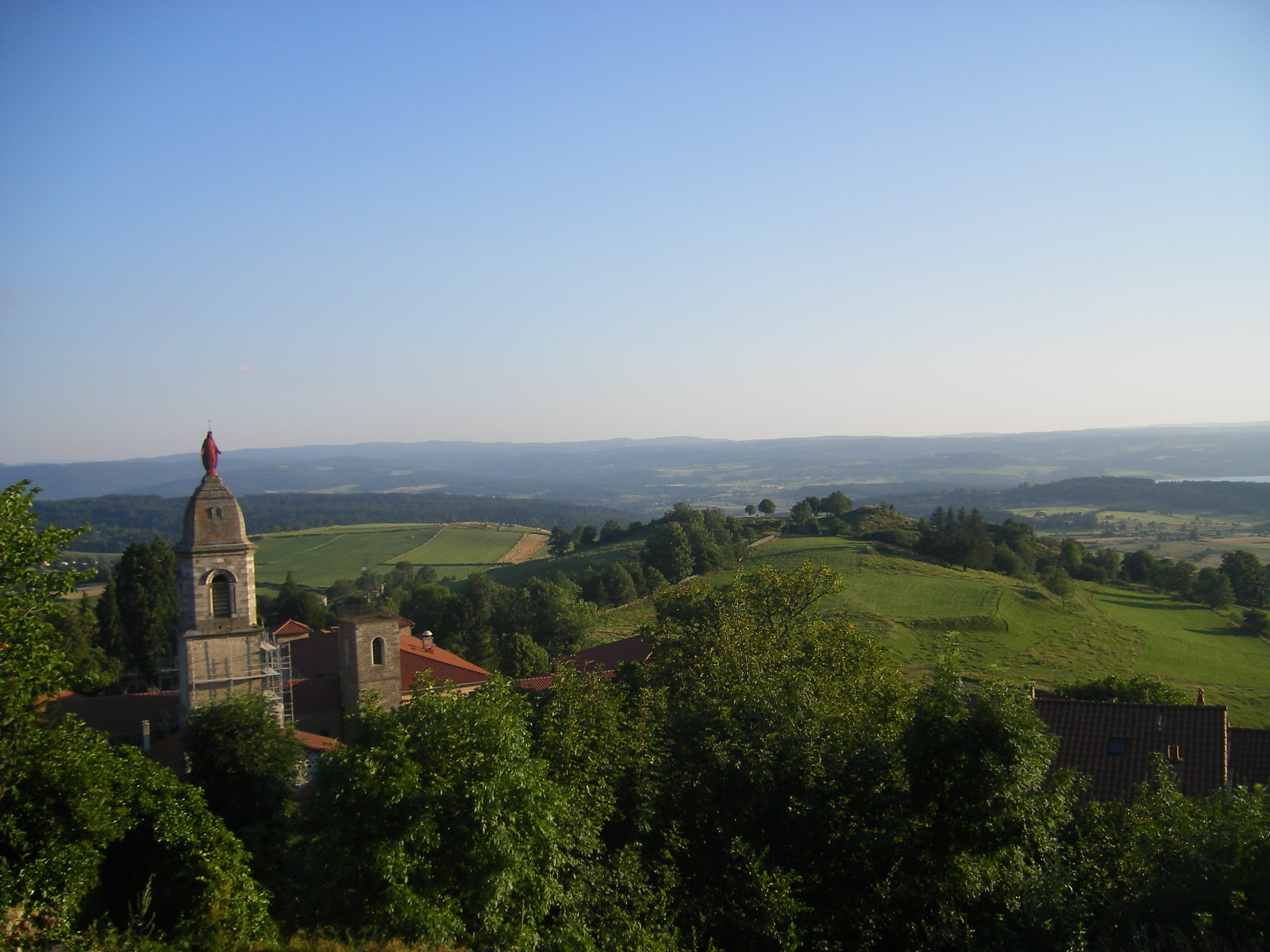

- Coat of arms
- Location of Pradelles
- Location within France Location within Auvergne-Rhône-Alpes
- Coordinates: 44°46′14″N 3°52′59″E
- Country: France
- Region: Auvergne-Rhône-Alpes
- Department: Haute-Loire
- Arrondissement: Le Puy-en-Velay
- Canton: Velay volcanique

Government
  - Mayor (2020–2026): Alain Robert
- Area^{1}: 17.48 km^{2} (6.75 sq mi)
- Elevation: 1,157 m (3,796 ft)
- Highest elevation: 1,302 m (4,272 ft)
- Lowest elevation: 880 m (2,890 ft)
- Population (2023): 531
  - Density: 30.4/km^{2} (78.7/sq mi)
- Time zone: UTC+01:00 (CET)
  - Summer (DST): UTC+02:00 (CEST)
- INSEE/Postal code: 43154 /43420
- ^{1} French Land Register data, which excludes lakes, ponds, glaciers > 1 km^{2} (0.386 sq mi or 247 acres) and river estuaries.

Pradelles (French pronunciation: [pʁadɛl]; Occitan: Pradèlas) is a commune in the Haute-Loire department in south-central France. It is a member of Les Plus Beaux Villages de France (The Most Beautiful Villages of France) Association.

== Sights ==
The Robert Louis Stevenson Trail (GR 70), a popular long-distance path, runs through the town, though Stevenson stayed here less than an hour during his 1878 journey, described in the book Travels with a Donkey in the Cévennes.

== Population ==
Historical population
Year	Pop.	±% p.a.
1968	733	—
1975	618	−2.41%
1982	570	−1.15%
1990	584	+0.30%
1999	581	−0.06%
2007	626	+0.94%
2012	621	−0.16%
2017	549	−2.43%
2023	531	−0.55%
Source: INSEE

== See also ==
- Communes of the Haute-Loire department
