= Chasseradès =

- Part of Mont Lozère et Goulet
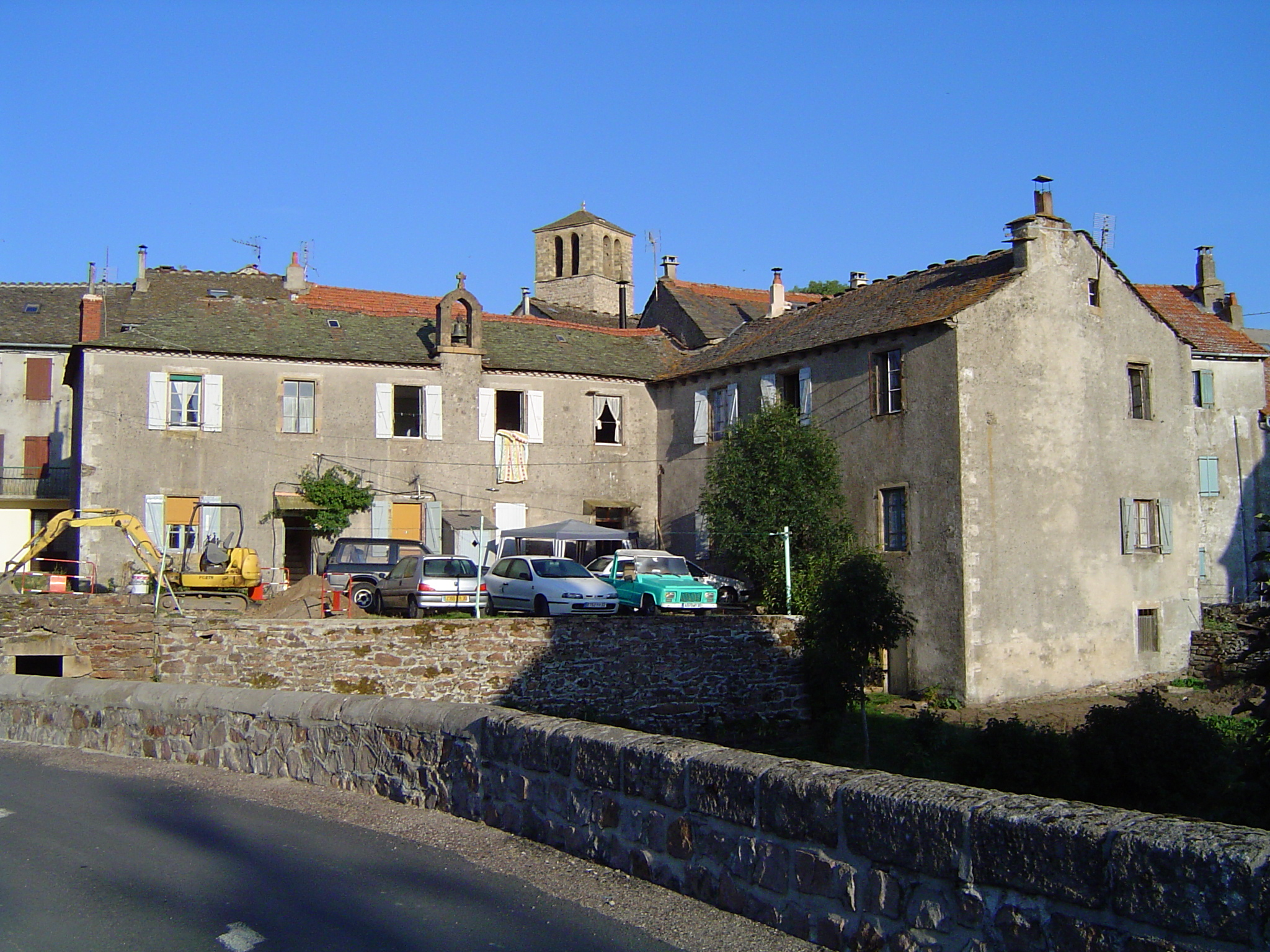
- The church tower and surrounding buildings, in Chasseradès
- Location of Chasseradès
- Location within France Location within Occitanie
- Coordinates: 44°33′07″N 3°49′36″E
- Country: France
- Region: Occitania
- Department: Lozère
- Arrondissement: Mende
- Canton: Saint-Étienne-du-Valdonnez
- Commune: Mont Lozère et Goulet
- Area^{1}: 61.93 km^{2} (23.91 sq mi)
- Elevation: 1,171 m (3,842 ft)
- Highest elevation: 1,482 m (4,862 ft)
- Lowest elevation: 951 m (3,120 ft)
- Population (2022): 152
  - Density: 2.45/km^{2} (6.36/sq mi)
- Time zone: UTC+01:00 (CET)
  - Summer (DST): UTC+02:00 (CEST)
- Postal code: 48250
- ^{1} French Land Register data, which excludes lakes, ponds, glaciers > 1 km^{2} (0.386 sq mi or 247 acres) and river estuaries.

Chasseradès (French pronunciation: [ʃasʁadɛs]; Occitan: Chassaradés) is a former commune in the Lozère department in southern France. On 1 January 2017, it was merged into the new commune Mont Lozère et Goulet. Its population was 152 in 2022.

The Scottish author Robert Louis Stevenson stayed at an inn in the village of Chasseradès on the night of 27 September 1878, as recounted in his book Travels with a Donkey in the Cévennes. The Robert Louis Stevenson Trail (GR 70), a popular long-distance path following Stevenson's approximate route, runs through the village.

== Geography ==
The commune is traversed by the river Chassezac.

== See also ==
- Communes of the Lozère department
