= Saint-Étienne-Vallée-Française =

- Commune
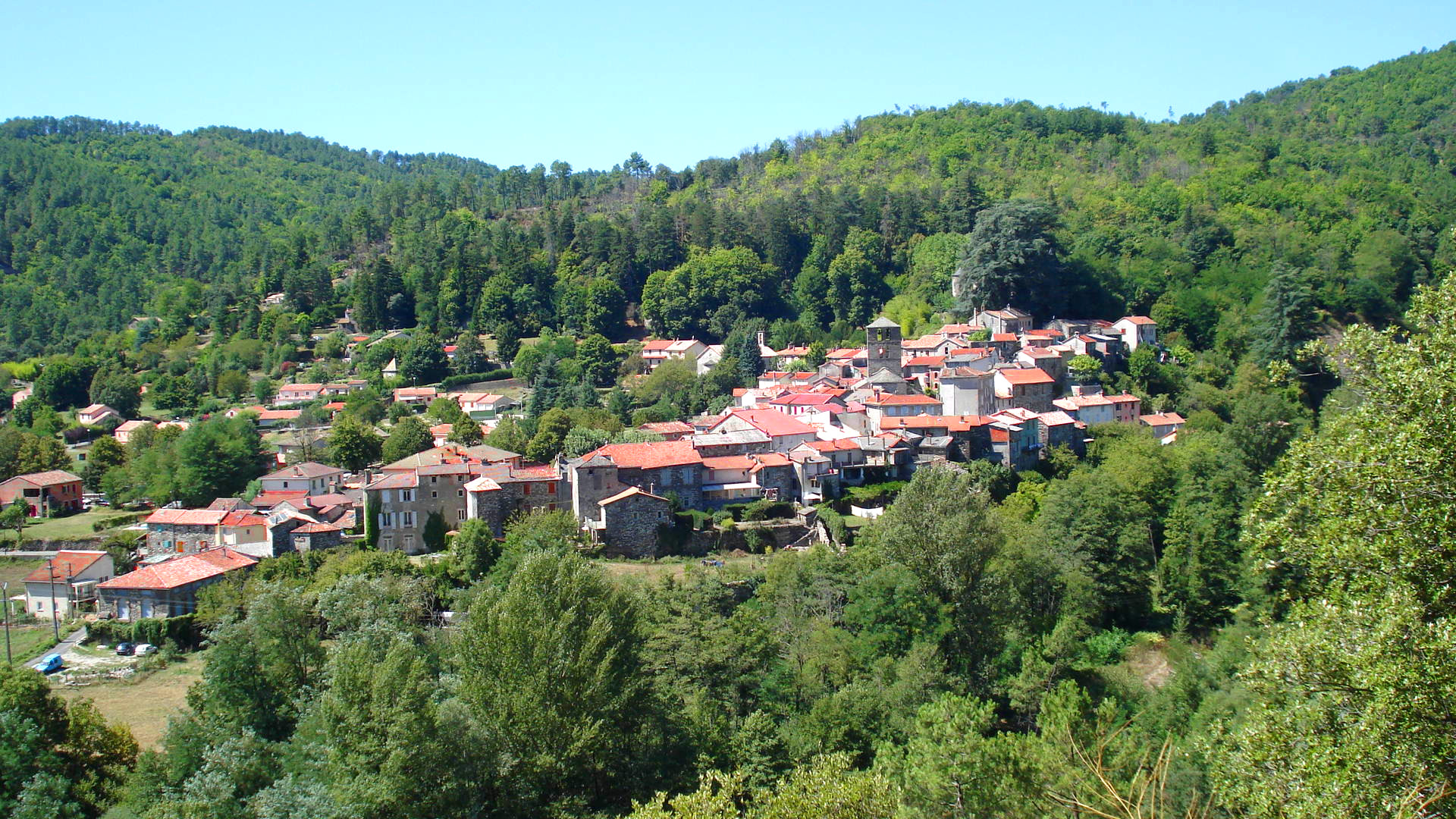
- A view of the village from the south
- Location of Saint-Étienne-Vallée-Française
- Location within France Location within Occitanie
- Coordinates: 44°10′04″N 3°50′33″E
- Country: France
- Region: Occitania
- Department: Lozère
- Arrondissement: Florac
- Canton: Le Collet-de-Dèze

Government
  - Mayor (2021–2026): Patrick Valdeyron
- Area^{1}: 50.99 km^{2} (19.69 sq mi)
- Elevation: 245 m (804 ft)
- Highest elevation: 925 m (3,035 ft)
- Lowest elevation: 194 m (636 ft)
- Population (2023): 493
  - Density: 9.67/km^{2} (25.0/sq mi)
- Time zone: UTC+01:00 (CET)
  - Summer (DST): UTC+02:00 (CEST)
- INSEE/Postal code: 48148 /48330
- ^{1} French Land Register data, which excludes lakes, ponds, glaciers > 1 km^{2} (0.386 sq mi or 247 acres) and river estuaries.

Saint-Étienne-Vallée-Française (French pronunciation: [sɛ̃t‿etjɛn vale fʁɑ̃sɛːz]; Occitan: Sent Estève de Valfrancesca) is a commune in the Lozère department in southern France.

The Scottish author Robert Louis Stevenson passed through the village on 2 October 1878, as recounted in his book Travels with a Donkey in the Cévennes:

I went down beside the Gardon of Mialet, a great glaring watercourse devoid of water, and through St. Etienne de Vallée Française, or Val Francesque, as they used to call it; and towards evening began to ascend the hill of St. Pierre.

The Robert Louis Stevenson Trail (GR 70), a popular long-distance path following Stevenson's approximate route, runs through the village.

== See also ==
- Communes of the Lozère department
