= Travels with a Donkey in the Cévennes =

Book by Robert Louis Stevenson

- Author: Robert Louis Stevenson
- Language: English
- Publication date: 1879

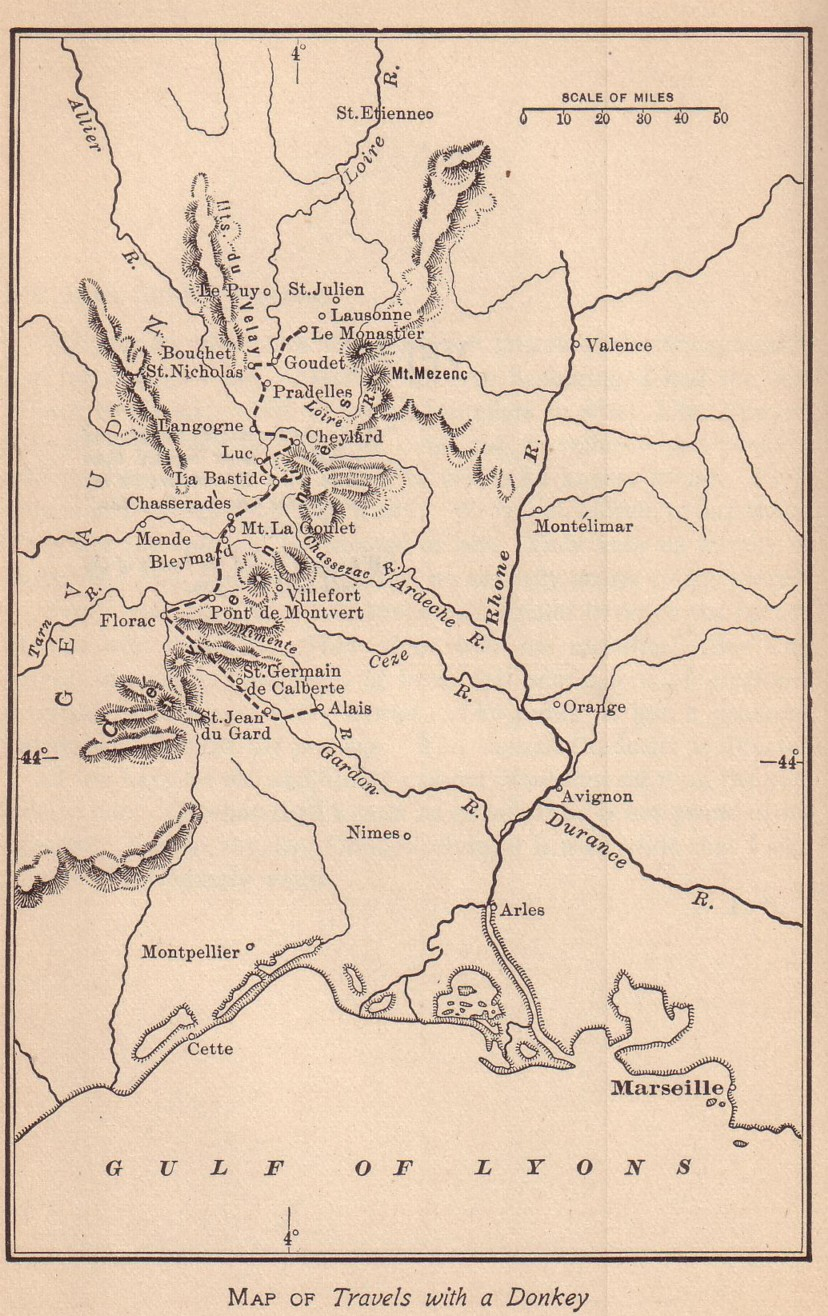
Map of route

Travels with a Donkey in the Cévennes (1879) is one of Robert Louis Stevenson's earliest published works and is considered a pioneering classic of outdoor literature.

== Background ==
Stevenson was in his late 20s and still dependent on his parents for support. His journey was designed to provide material for publication while allowing him to distance himself from a love affair with an American woman of which his friends and family did not approve and who had returned to her husband in California.

Travels recounts Stevenson's 12-day, 200-kilometre (120 mi) solo hiking journey through the sparsely populated and impoverished areas of the Cévennes mountains in south-central France in 1878. The terrain, with its barren rocky heather-filled hillsides, he often compared to parts of Scotland. The other principal character is Modestine, a stubborn, manipulative donkey he could never quite master. It is one of the earliest accounts to present hiking and camping outdoors as a recreational activity. It also tells of commissioning one of the first sleeping bags, large and heavy enough to require a donkey to carry. Stevenson is several times mistaken for a peddler, the usual occupation of someone traveling in his fashion. Some locals are horrified that he would sleep outdoors and suggest it is dangerous to do so because of wolves or robbers. Stevenson provides the reader with the philosophy behind his undertaking:

For my part, I travel not to go anywhere, but to go. I travel for travel's sake. The great affair is to move; to feel the needs and hitches of our life more clearly; to come down off this feather-bed of civilization, and find the globe granite underfoot and strewn with cutting flints. Alas, as we get up in life, and are more preoccupied with our affairs, even a holiday is a thing that must be worked for. To hold a pack upon a pack-saddle against a gale out of the freezing north is no high industry, but it is one that serves to occupy and compose the mind. And when the present is so exacting who can annoy himself about the future?

The Cévennes was the site of a Protestant rebellion around 1702, severely suppressed by Catholic Louis XIV. The Protestant insurgents were known as the Camisards. Stevenson was Protestant by upbringing, and a non-believer by philosophy. Stevenson was well-versed in the history and evokes scenes from the rebellion as he passes through the area of the rebellion during the final days of his trek. He notes that the Catholics and the Protestants, at the time of his travels, live peaceably alongside one another, though each community is faithful to its own traditions and its version of the region's history. All disapprove equally of a young Catholic man who married a Protestant girl and changed his faith, agreeing that "It's a bad idea for a man to change." As for a Catholic priest who left the priesthood and married, the sentiment common to all was that it is wrong to change one's commitments.

The book appeared the following year, 1879, and is dedicated to his friend Sidney Colvin, an art historian and critic who had befriended him when he was unpublished and seeking to develop a career as a writer.

== Stevenson's itinerary ==
Day	Day of the week	Date 1878	Region	Points passed Stevenson's stages
1	Saturday	September 22	Velay	Le Monastier, Saint-Martin-de-Fugères, Goudet, Ussel, Costaros, Le Bouchet-Saint-Nicolas
2	Sunday	September 23	Velay	Landos, Pradelles, Langogne
3	Monday	September 24	Gévaudan	Sagnerousse, Fouzilhic, Fouzilhac, night under the stars
4	Tuesday	September 25	Gévaudan	Cheylard-l'Évêque, Luc
5	Wednesday	September 26	Gévaudan	La Bastide-Puylaurent, Our Lady of the Snows Monastery
6	Thursday	September 27	Gévaudan	Chasseradès
7	Friday	September 28	Mont Lozère	l'Estampe, Le Bleymard, night under the stars
8	Saturday	September 29	Mont Lozère	Le Pont-de-Montvert, La Vernède, Cocurès
9	Sunday	September 30		Florac
10	Monday	October 1	Cévennes	Cassagnas
11	Tuesday	October 2	Cévennes	Saint-Germain-de-Calberte, Saint-Étienne-Vallée-Française
12	Wednesday	October 3	Cévennes	Saint-Jean-du-Gard

== Stevenson Trail ==
Beginning in the last decades of the twentieth century, hikers – sometimes with donkeys – have retraced the route Stevenson took on hiking paths (GR footpath GR 70), some of which were once transhumance routes taken annually by shepherds and their flocks. Asked in 2007 why this "Ecossais veritable" continues to have such an impact on the identity of the people of the Cévennes today, a local politician and historian at St Germain de Calberte told the Scottish writer Alastair McIntosh, "Because he showed us the landscape that makes us who we are."

Several writers, such as the Scottish novelist Christopher Rush, have written of their own efforts to retrace Stevenson's steps. Accounts include a bicycle trip 25 years after Stevenson's hike and a comic adventure on the part of two British women. A section of Richard Holmes' Footsteps: Adventures of a Romantic Biographer chronicles the author's retracing of Stevenson's journey as well.

== Cultural references ==
- In John Steinbeck's 1932 novel The Pastures of Heaven, one character regards Stevenson's Travels with a Donkey in the Cévennes as one of the greatest works of English literature and names his son Robert Louis. Steinbeck and his wife Elaine were inspired by Stevenson in choosing the title of his 1962 book Travels with Charley.

== Adaptations ==
=== Films ===
- Voyage avec un âne dans les Cévennes (1975), directed by Jean Kerchbron
- Travels with a Donkey (1978), directed by Gavin Millar
- Voyage avec un âne dans les Cévennes (2015), directed by François Marret
- My Donkey, My Lover & I (original title: Antoinette dans les Cévennes) (2020), directed by Caroline Vignal

=== Theatre ===
- Voyages avec un âne dans les Cévennes, a show by Théâtre S'Amourailles
