= Mont Lozère =

Mountain in southern France

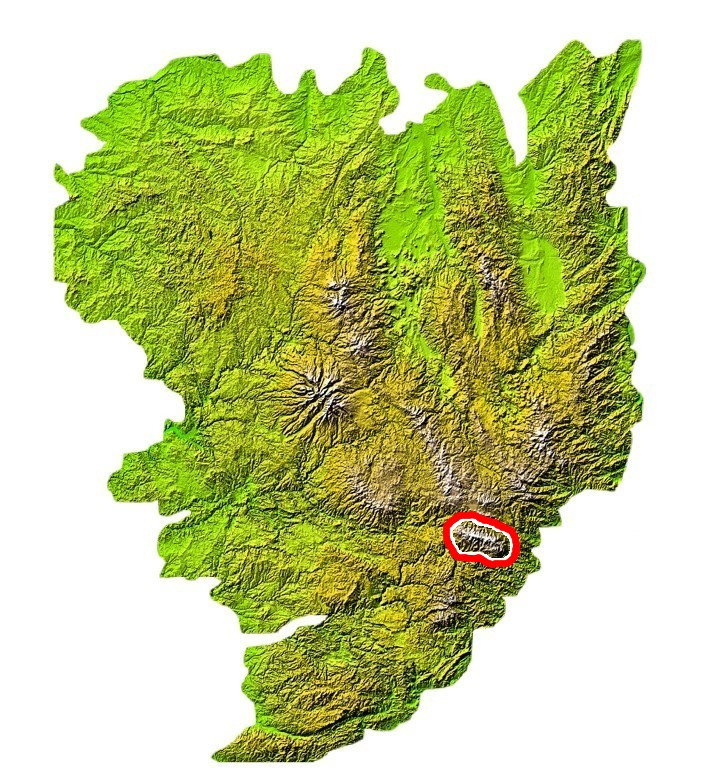

Highest point
- Elevation: 1,699 m (5,574 ft) at Sommet de Finiels
- Prominence: 649 m (2,129 ft)
- Coordinates: 44°25′34″N 3°44′21″E

Geography
- Location within France
- Location: Lozère, France
- Parent range: Cévennes

Mont Lozère (Occitan: Mont Losera) is a massif in the Cévennes, a subrange of the Massif Central in France. It is 1,699 metres (5,574 ft) above sea level and lies within the Cévennes National Park.

Mont Lozère is commonly used for skiing during the winter months. It is also a popular destination for student groups during the summer months. It offers some natural scenery and is covered by coniferous plantations and 'broom' scrub moorland.

Mont Lozère is the source of the River Tarn, and also the highest point on the Robert Louis Stevenson Trail (GR 70), a popular long-distance path following approximately the route travelled by Robert Louis Stevenson in 1878 and described in his book Travels with a Donkey in the Cévennes. The GR70 follows a draille (drove road) across the mountain, marked by montjoies (standing stones).
