= Cassagnas =

- Commune
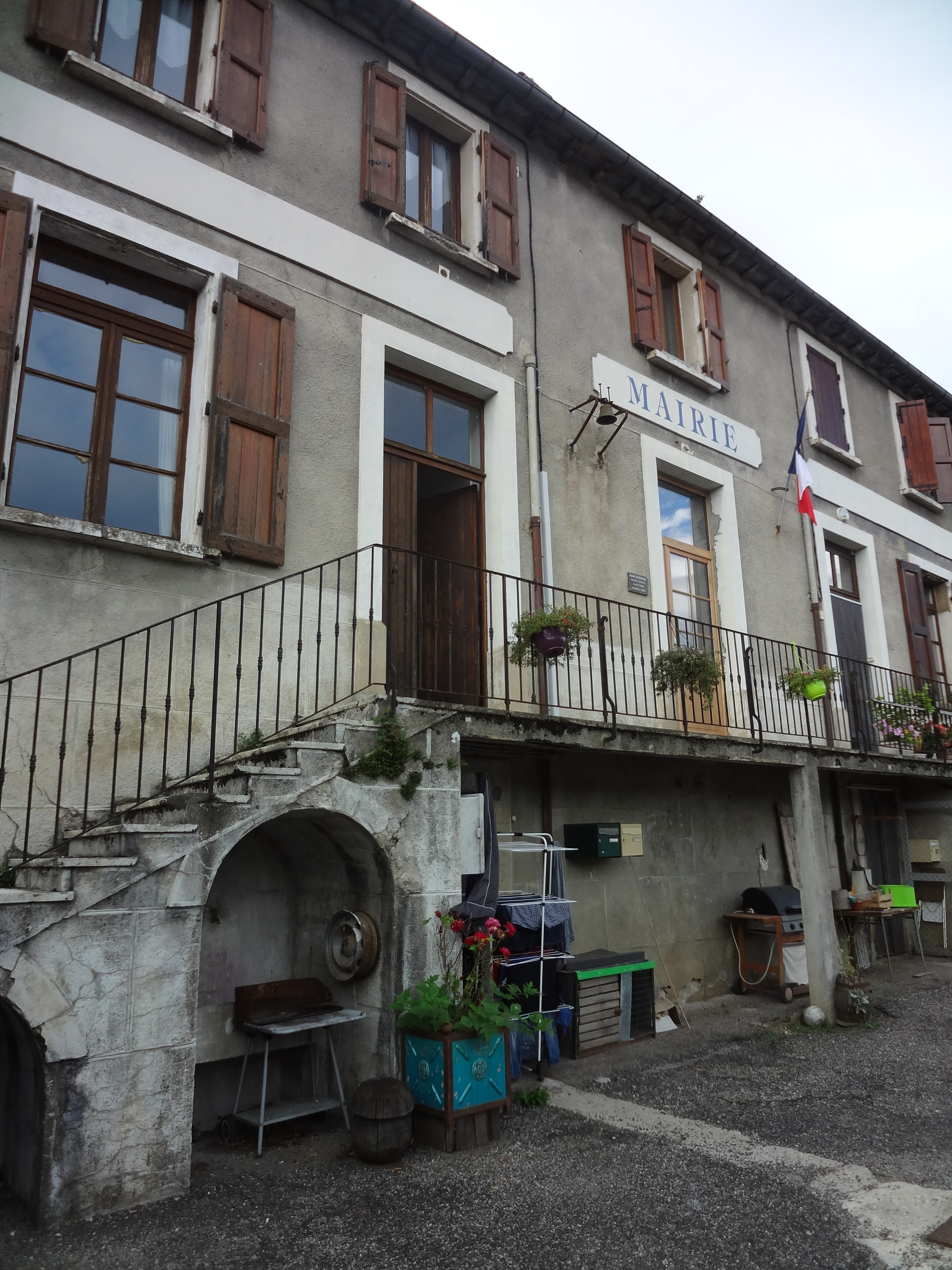
- The town hall of Cassagnas
- Location of Cassagnas
- Location within France Location within Occitanie
- Coordinates: 44°16′19″N 3°44′50″E
- Country: France
- Region: Occitania
- Department: Lozère
- Arrondissement: Florac
- Canton: Le Collet-de-Dèze
- Intercommunality: CC Gorges Causses Cévennes

Government
  - Mayor (2020–2026): Jean Wilkin
- Area^{1}: 35.19 km^{2} (13.59 sq mi)
- Elevation: 770 m (2,530 ft)
- Highest elevation: 1,398 m (4,587 ft)
- Lowest elevation: 667 m (2,188 ft)
- Population (2023): 126
  - Density: 3.58/km^{2} (9.27/sq mi)
- Time zone: UTC+01:00 (CET)
  - Summer (DST): UTC+02:00 (CEST)
- INSEE/Postal code: 48036 /48400
- ^{1} French Land Register data, which excludes lakes, ponds, glaciers > 1 km^{2} (0.386 sq mi or 247 acres) and river estuaries.

Cassagnas is a commune in the Lozère department in southern France.

The village of Cassagnas lies in the valley of the River Mimente, and on the Robert Louis Stevenson Trail (GR 70), a popular long-distance path following approximately the route travelled by Robert Louis Stevenson in 1878 and described in his book Travels with a Donkey in the Cévennes. Stevenson mentions the village by name:

I was now drawing near to Cassagnas, a cluster of black roofs upon the hillside, in this wild valley, among chestnut gardens, and looked upon in the clear air by many rocky peaks. The road along the Mimente is yet new, nor have the mountaineers recovered their surprise when the first cart arrived at Cassagnas.

== See also ==
- Communes of the Lozère department
