= Landos =

- Commune
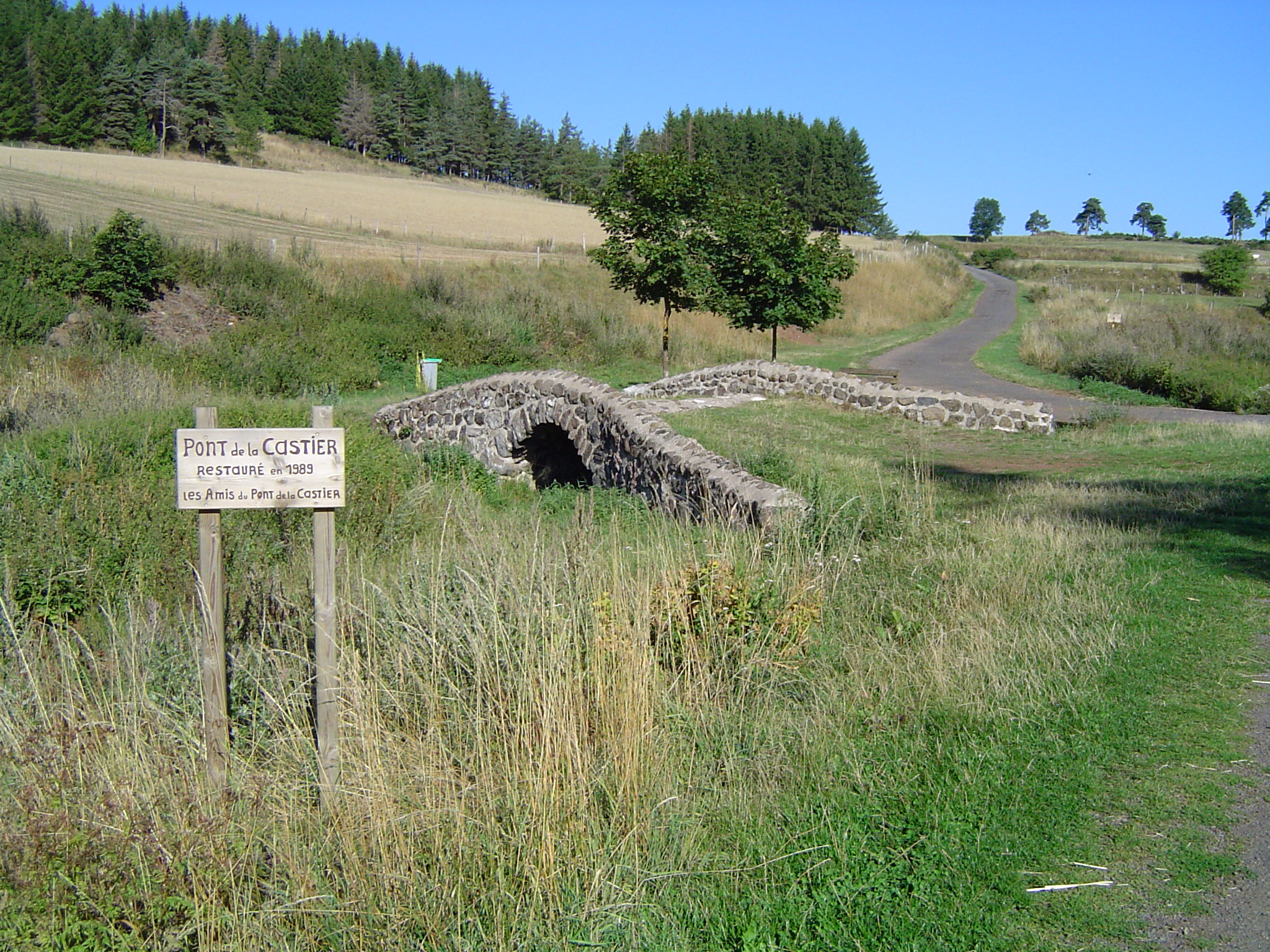
- Castier Bridge
- Location of Landos
- Location within France Location within Auvergne-Rhône-Alpes
- Coordinates: 44°50′37″N 3°49′57″E
- Country: France
- Region: Auvergne-Rhône-Alpes
- Department: Haute-Loire
- Arrondissement: Le Puy-en-Velay
- Canton: Velay volcanique

Government
  - Mayor (2020–2026): Jean-Louis Reynaud
- Area^{1}: 36.51 km^{2} (14.10 sq mi)
- Elevation: 1,120 m (3,670 ft)
- Highest elevation: 1,237 m (4,058 ft)
- Lowest elevation: 978 m (3,209 ft)
- Population (2023): 873
  - Density: 23.9/km^{2} (61.9/sq mi)
- Time zone: UTC+01:00 (CET)
  - Summer (DST): UTC+02:00 (CEST)
- INSEE/Postal code: 43111 /43340
- ^{1} French Land Register data, which excludes lakes, ponds, glaciers > 1 km^{2} (0.386 sq mi or 247 acres) and river estuaries.

Landos (French pronunciation: [lɑ̃dɔs]; Occitan: Landòs) is a commune in the Haute-Loire department in south-central France.

The Robert Louis Stevenson Trail (GR 70), a popular long-distance path, runs through the town, which is also on a disused railway from Le Puy-en-Velay to Langogne.

== Population ==
Historical population
| Year | Pop. | ±% p.a. |
|---|---|---|
| 1968 | 1,205 | — |
| 1975 | 1,147 | −0.70% |
| 1982 | 1,064 | −1.07% |
| 1990 | 1,006 | −0.70% |
| 1999 | 901 | −1.22% |
| 2007 | 876 | −0.35% |
| 2012 | 926 | +1.12% |
| 2017 | 891 | −0.77% |
| 2023 | 873 | −0.34% |
Source: INSEE

== See also ==
- Communes of the Haute-Loire department
