= Cheylard-l'Évêque =

- Commune
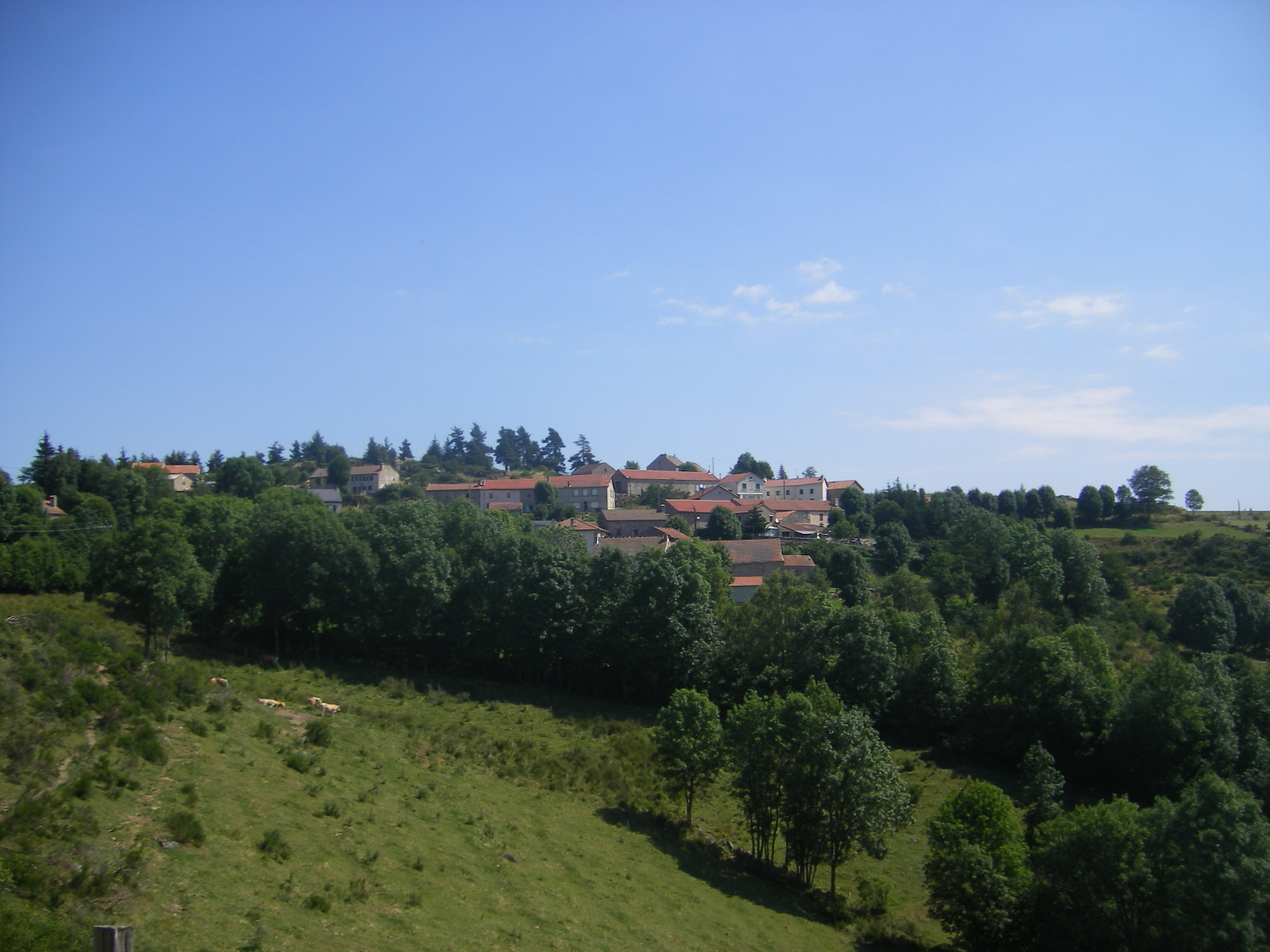
- A general view of Cheylard-l'Évêque
- Location of Cheylard-l'Évêque
- Location within France Location within Occitanie
- Coordinates: 44°38′55″N 3°48′12″E
- Country: France
- Region: Occitania
- Department: Lozère
- Arrondissement: Mende
- Canton: Langogne

Government
  - Mayor (2020–2026): Patrick Ferreres
- Area^{1}: 29.64 km^{2} (11.44 sq mi)
- Elevation: 1,200 m (3,900 ft)
- Highest elevation: 1,491 m (4,892 ft)
- Lowest elevation: 1,055 m (3,461 ft)
- Population (2023): 65
  - Density: 2.2/km^{2} (5.7/sq mi)
- Time zone: UTC+01:00 (CET)
  - Summer (DST): UTC+02:00 (CEST)
- INSEE/Postal code: 48048 /48300
- ^{1} French Land Register data, which excludes lakes, ponds, glaciers > 1 km^{2} (0.386 sq mi or 247 acres) and river estuaries.

Cheylard-l'Évêque (French pronunciation: [ʃelaʁ levɛk]; Occitan: Lo Chailar de l'Avesque) is a commune in the Lozère department in southern France.

Sagnerousse, which is within the commune of Cheylard-l'Évêque, and the village of Cheylard-l'Évêque itself, were visited by Robert Louis Stevenson on September 24 and 25, 1878, respectively. They are mentioned in Travels with a Donkey in the Cévennes. The Robert Louis Stevenson Trail (GR 70), a popular long-distance path approximately following Stevenson's journey, runs through both settlements.

== See also ==
- Communes of the Lozère department
