= Rocles, Lozère =

Rocles
- Commune
- Location of Rocles
- Location within France Location within Occitanie
- Coordinates: 44°42′51″N 3°47′01″E
- Country: France
- Region: Occitania
- Department: Lozère
- Arrondissement: Mende
- Canton: Langogne

Government
  - Mayor (2020–2026): Pierre Mallet
- Area^{1}: 19.84 km^{2} (7.66 sq mi)
- Elevation: 1,100 m (3,600 ft)
- Highest elevation: 1,243 m (4,078 ft)
- Lowest elevation: 976 m (3,202 ft)
- Population (2023): 249
  - Density: 12.6/km^{2} (32.5/sq mi)
- Time zone: UTC+01:00 (CET)
  - Summer (DST): UTC+02:00 (CEST)
- INSEE/Postal code: 48129 /48300
- ^{1} French Land Register data, which excludes lakes, ponds, glaciers > 1 km^{2} (0.386 sq mi or 247 acres) and river estuaries.

Rocles (French pronunciation: [ʁɔkl]; Occitan: Ròcla) is a commune in the Lozère department in southern France.

== See also ==
- Communes of the Lozère department
