= Saint-Flour-de-Mercoire =

- Commune
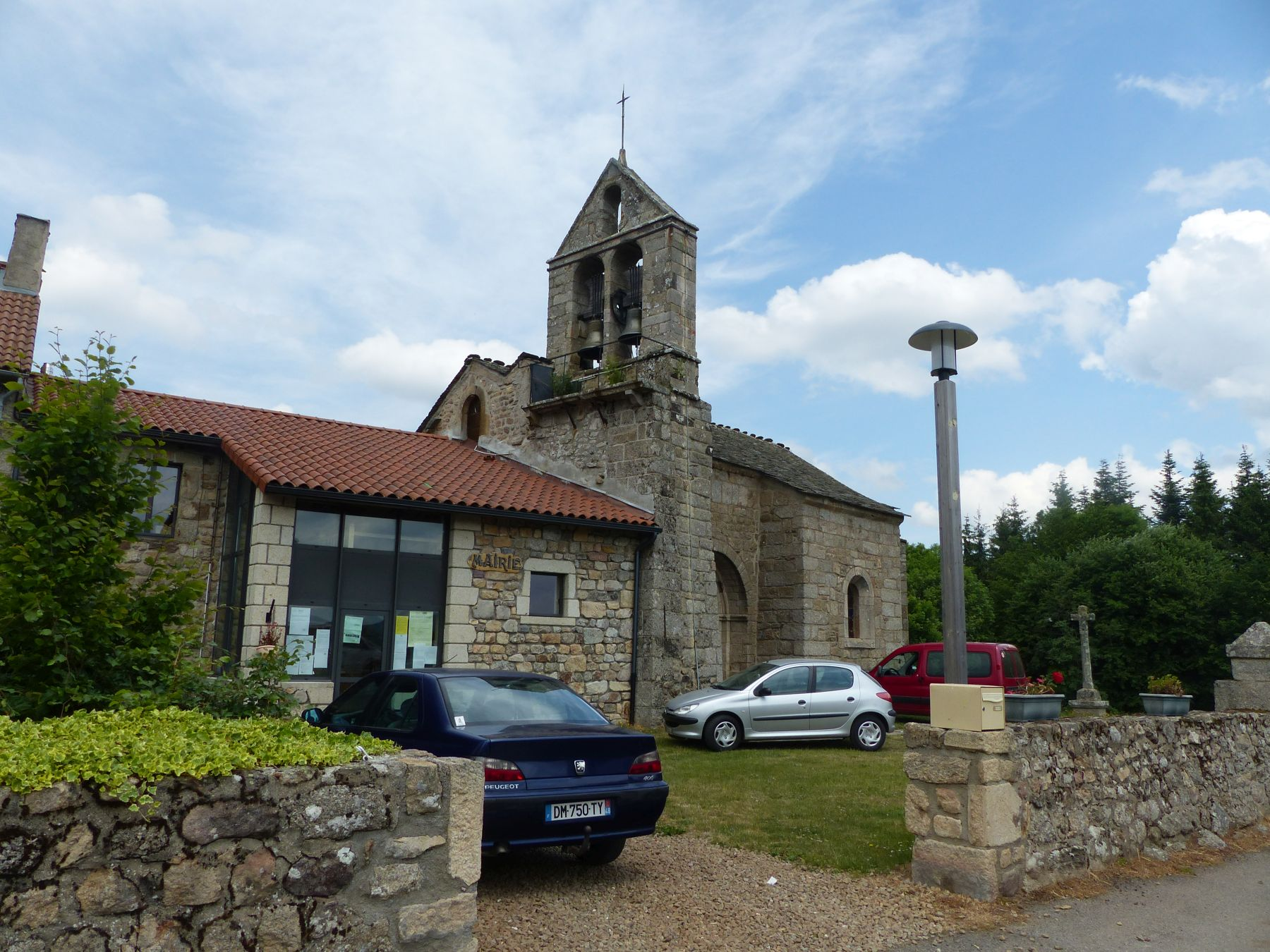
- Church and Mairie
- Location of Saint-Flour-de-Mercoire
- Location within France Location within Occitanie
- Coordinates: 44°41′47″N 3°49′34″E
- Country: France
- Region: Occitania
- Department: Lozère
- Arrondissement: Mende
- Canton: Langogne
- Intercommunality: CC Haut Allier Margeride

Government
  - Mayor (2020–2026): Guy Mayrand
- Area^{1}: 12.17 km^{2} (4.70 sq mi)
- Elevation: 1,000 m (3,300 ft)
- Highest elevation: 1,229 m (4,032 ft)
- Lowest elevation: 954 m (3,130 ft)
- Population (2023): 185
  - Density: 15.2/km^{2} (39.4/sq mi)
- Time zone: UTC+01:00 (CET)
  - Summer (DST): UTC+02:00 (CEST)
- INSEE/Postal code: 48150 /48300
- ^{1} French Land Register data, which excludes lakes, ponds, glaciers > 1 km^{2} (0.386 sq mi or 247 acres) and river estuaries.

Saint-Flour-de-Mercoire (French pronunciation: [sɛ̃ fluʁ də mɛʁkwaʁ]; Occitan: Sant Flor de Mercoira) is a commune in the Lozère department in southern France. The Robert Louis Stevenson Trail (GR 70), a popular long-distance path, runs through the village.

== See also ==
- Communes of the Lozère department
