= Goudet =

- Commune
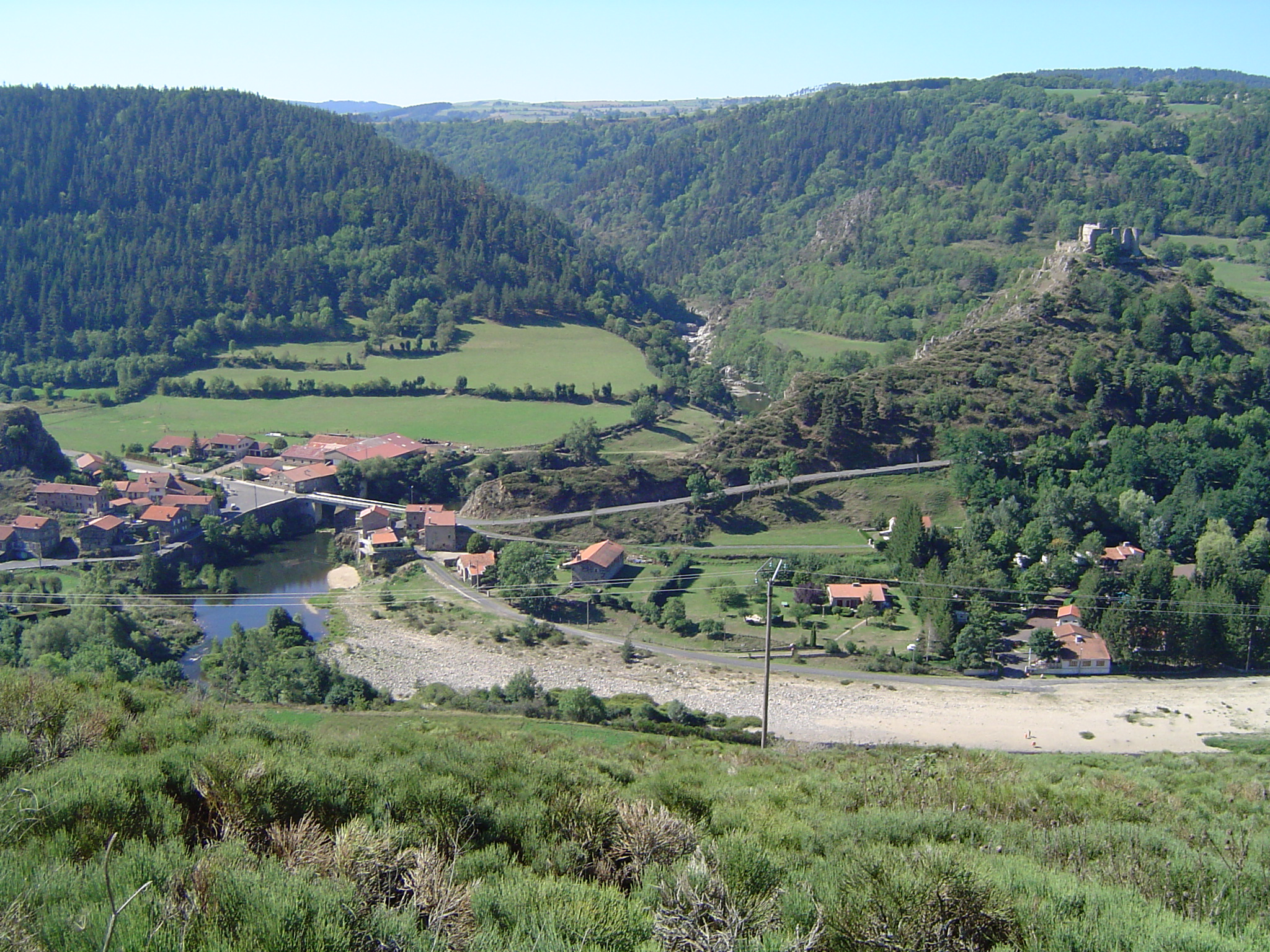
- The Loire and the Château de Beaufort
- Location of Goudet
- Location within France Location within Auvergne-Rhône-Alpes
- Coordinates: 44°53′24″N 3°55′35″E
- Country: France
- Region: Auvergne-Rhône-Alpes
- Department: Haute-Loire
- Arrondissement: Le Puy-en-Velay
- Canton: Mézenc

Government
  - Mayor (2023–2026): Jean-Claude Massebeuf
- Area^{1}: 4.5 km^{2} (1.7 sq mi)
- Elevation: 770 m (2,530 ft)
- Highest elevation: 1,018 m (3,340 ft)
- Lowest elevation: 733 m (2,405 ft)
- Population (2023): 85
  - Density: 19/km^{2} (49/sq mi)
- Time zone: UTC+01:00 (CET)
  - Summer (DST): UTC+02:00 (CEST)
- INSEE/Postal code: 43101 /43150
- ^{1} French Land Register data, which excludes lakes, ponds, glaciers > 1 km^{2} (0.386 sq mi or 247 acres) and river estuaries.

Goudet (French pronunciation: [ɡudɛ]) is a commune in the Haute-Loire department in south-central France. The village stands on the upper reaches of the river Loire and is overlooked by the Château de Beaufort, built in the 13th century, of importance during the Hundred Years War and the French Wars of Religion but abandoned after the Revolution of 1789.

The Robert Louis Stevenson Trail (GR 70), a popular long-distance path, runs through the village, as do the GR3 and GR40.

== Population ==
Historical population
Year	Pop.	±% p.a.
1968	92	—
1975	82	−1.63%
1982	80	−0.35%
1990	65	−2.56%
1999	63	−0.35%
2007	62	−0.20%
2012	56	−2.02%
2017	60	+1.39%
2023	85	+5.98%
Source: INSEE

== See also ==
- Communes of the Haute-Loire department
