= Saint-Martin-de-Fugères =

- Commune
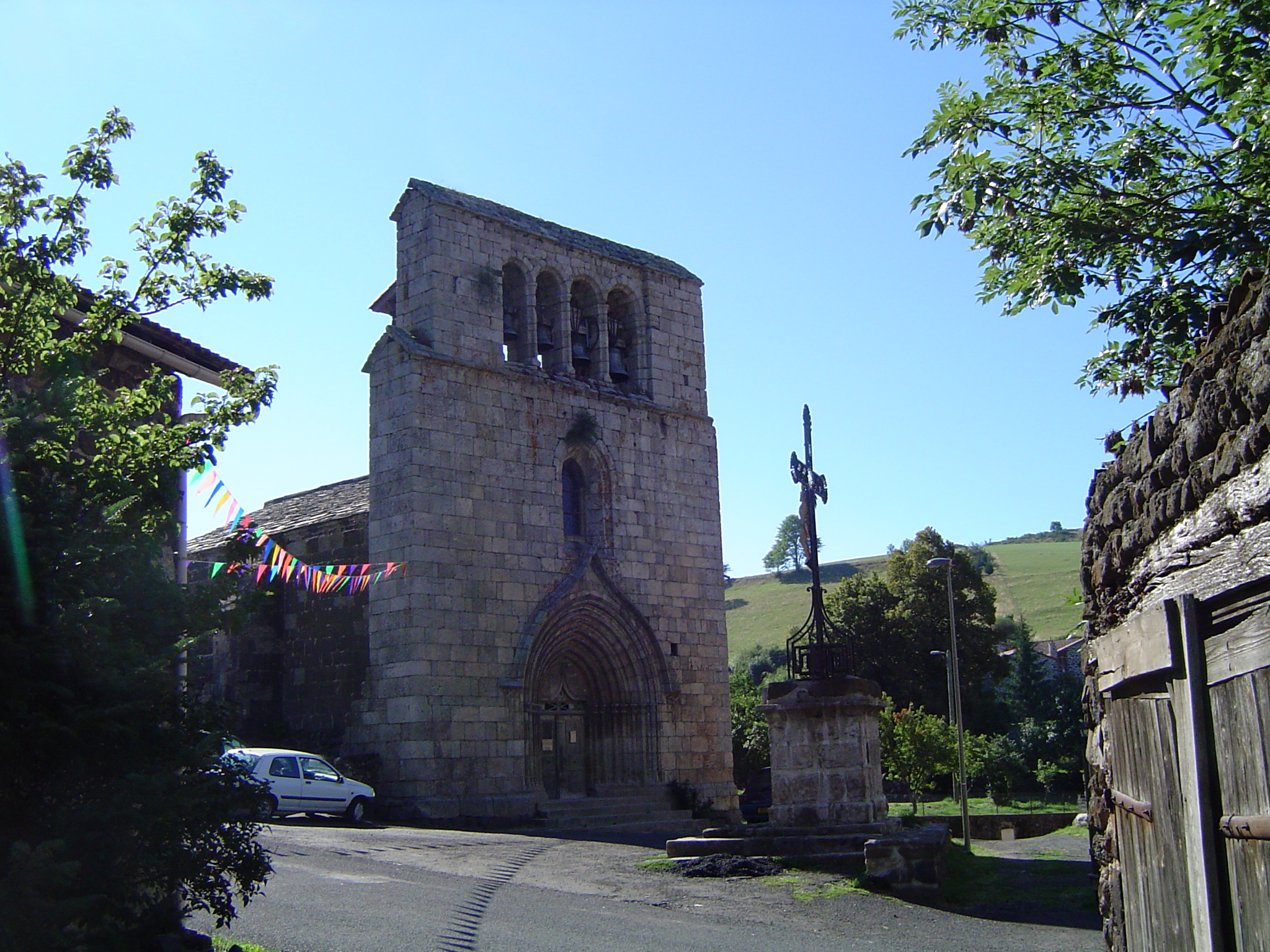
- Location of Saint-Martin-de-Fugères
- Location within France Location within Auvergne-Rhône-Alpes
- Coordinates: 44°54′24″N 3°56′07″E
- Country: France
- Region: Auvergne-Rhône-Alpes
- Department: Haute-Loire
- Arrondissement: Le Puy-en-Velay
- Canton: Mézenc

Government
  - Mayor (2023–2026): Jean Chambon
- Area^{1}: 20.87 km^{2} (8.06 sq mi)
- Elevation: 1,003 m (3,291 ft)
- Highest elevation: 1,185 m (3,888 ft)
- Lowest elevation: 725 m (2,379 ft)
- Population (2023): 228
  - Density: 10.9/km^{2} (28.3/sq mi)
- Time zone: UTC+01:00 (CET)
  - Summer (DST): UTC+02:00 (CEST)
- INSEE/Postal code: 43210 /43150
- ^{1} French Land Register data, which excludes lakes, ponds, glaciers > 1 km^{2} (0.386 sq mi or 247 acres) and river estuaries.

Saint-Martin-de-Fugères (French pronunciation: [sɛ̃ maʁtɛ̃ də fyʒɛʁ]) is a commune in the Haute-Loire department in south-central France.

== Population ==
Historical population
Year	Pop.	±% p.a.
1968	512	—
1975	422	−2.72%
1982	363	−2.13%
1990	266	−3.81%
1999	245	−0.91%
2007	240	−0.26%
2012	197	−3.87%
2017	219	+2.14%
2023	228	+0.67%
Source: INSEE

== Sights ==
The Robert Louis Stevenson Trail (GR 70), a popular long-distance path, runs through the village.

== See also ==
- Communes of the Haute-Loire department
