= Luc, Lozère =

Luc
- Commune
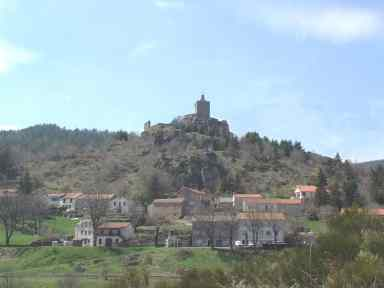
- The village of Luc, and the chateau

- Coat of arms
- Location of Luc
- Location within France Location within Occitanie
- Coordinates: 44°39′04″N 3°53′30″E
- Country: France
- Region: Occitania
- Department: Lozère
- Arrondissement: Mende
- Canton: Langogne

Government
  - Mayor (2020–2026): Patrice Clavel
- Area^{1}: 46.10 km^{2} (17.80 sq mi)
- Elevation: 971 m (3,186 ft)
- Highest elevation: 1,386 m (4,547 ft)
- Lowest elevation: 925 m (3,035 ft)
- Population (2023): 208
  - Density: 4.51/km^{2} (11.7/sq mi)
- Time zone: UTC+01:00 (CET)
  - Summer (DST): UTC+02:00 (CEST)
- INSEE/Postal code: 48086 /48250
- ^{1} French Land Register data, which excludes lakes, ponds, glaciers > 1 km^{2} (0.386 sq mi or 247 acres) and river estuaries.

Luc (French pronunciation: [lyk]) is a commune in the Lozère department in southern France.

The village of Luc is overlooked by the castle-ruin of Château de Luc. The Robert Louis Stevenson Trail (GR 70), a popular long-distance path, runs past the chateau and through the village.

== See also ==
- Communes of the Lozère department
