= Abbey of Notre-Dame des Neiges =

Cistercian abbey in Ardèche, France

Coordinates: 44.6003°N 3.9337°E

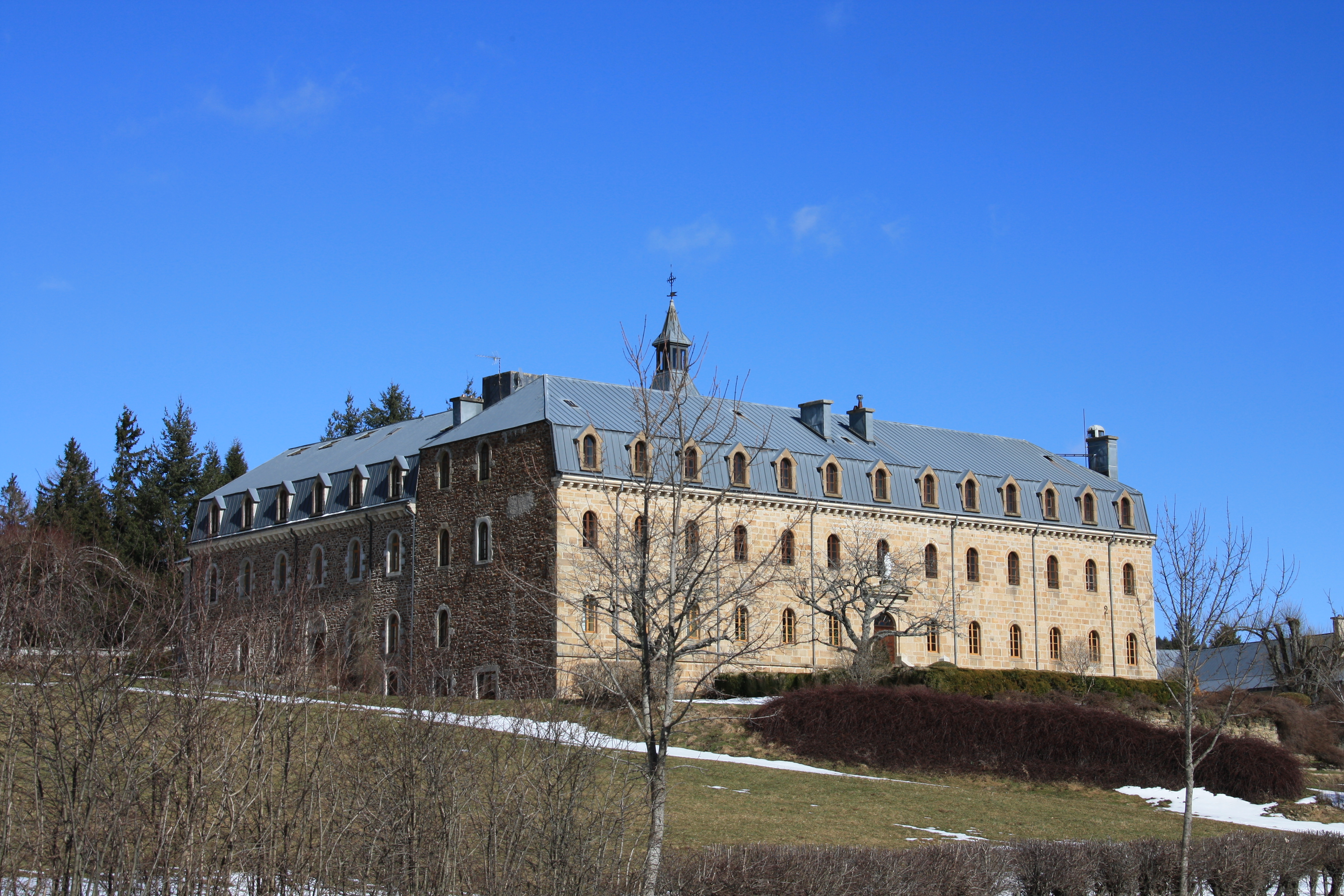
Abbey of Notre-Dame des Neiges

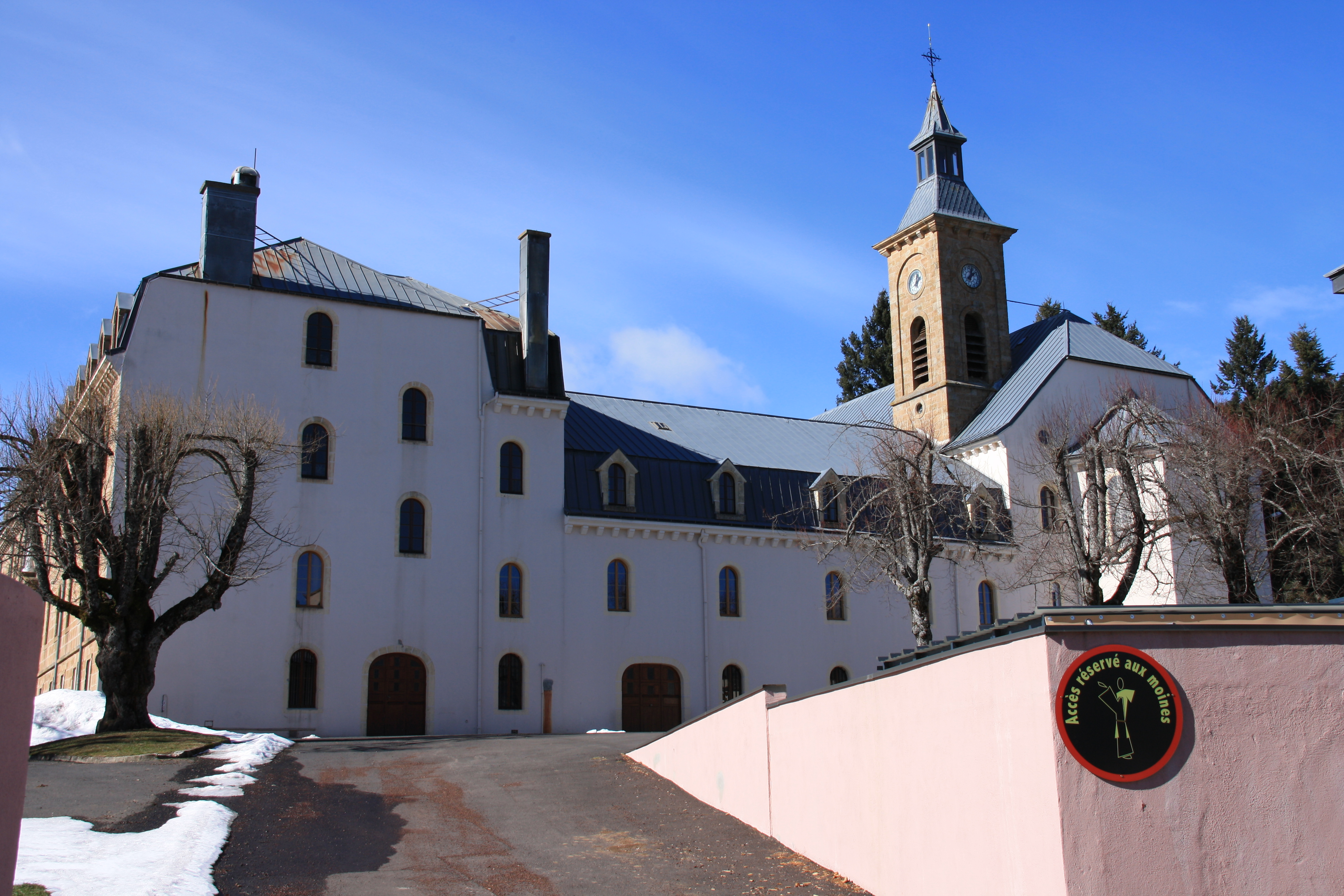
Entrance of the monastery

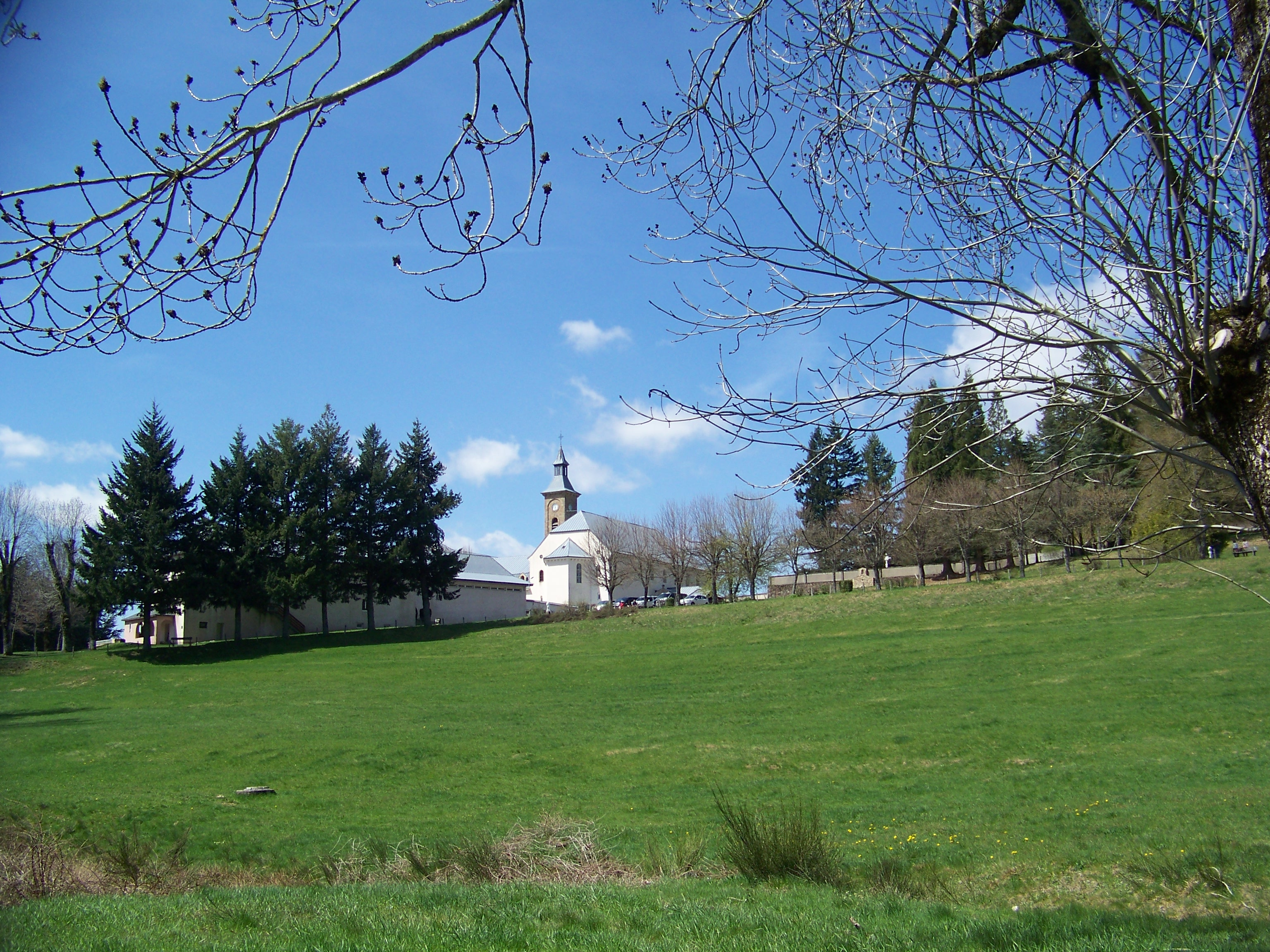
Buildings of the monastery

The Abbey of Notre-Dame des Neiges or Our Lady of the Snows (French: Abbaye Notre-Dame-des-Neiges) is a Cistercian monastery in the Ardèche département of south-central France. The former Trappist monastery has been resettled by Cistercian nuns in 2022. The abbey was built in 1850, and is located within the commune of Saint-Laurent-les-Bains, about one and a half miles east of the village of La Bastide-Puylaurent (Lozère).

== History ==
Before the French Revolution, there were several Cistercian monasteries in the region, namely Mazan Abbey, Les Chambons Abbey, and Mercoire Abbey, but these were destroyed and sold off during the Revolution.

In 1791, Jean Chalbos purchased a former barn of Les Chambons. His descendants offered to return the land to monastic use and offered it to Aiguebelle Abbey, who initially declined the offer, but eventually accepted the second time, having received encouragement from the bishops of Valence and Viviers.

The monastery was officially founded on 5 August 1850, the feast day of Our Lady of the Snows. The priory was elevated to an abbey in 1874, with the election of their first abbot, Polycarpe Marthoud. At the time, there were some 90 members of the abbey.

Robert Louis Stevenson visited in 1878 while on a hiking trip he described in Travels with a Donkey in the Cévennes.

The French Third Republic initially planned to expel the monks again in November 1880; however, a sudden snowfall prevented the expulsion. With the threat of persecution, the abbot made a foundation in Akbes, Syria, so as to ensure that a refuge was available for the monks should they be expelled again.

In January 1890, Charles de Foucauld entered the monastery as a novice, and was given the religious name "Marie-Albéric". Because of his plea, after some months he was sent to the Syrian abbey of La Trappe at Akbès.

The monastery was burned down in a fire in 1912 and was rebuilt. In January 2022, the Vatican announced that Notre-Dame des Neiges had to be closed because of the lack of novices and the death of two brothers in 2021. According to the newspaper La Croix, the remaining ten brothers made the decision together on Christmas Eve 2021.

The abbey was resettled in December 2022 by eight Cistercian nuns from St Mary's Abbey in Boulaur, whose number had grown to twelve by 2024. The sisters' revenue-generating activities include the sale of spring water, essential oils, soap and other cleaning products.
