= Randon =

Randon may refer to:

== Places ==
- Arzenc-de-Randon, commune in the Lozère department in southern France
- Canton of Châteauneuf-de-Randon, a former canton of France, located in the Lozère department
- Châteauneuf-de-Randon, commune in the Lozère department in southern France
- Monts-de-Randon, commune in the Lozère department in southern France
- Rieutort-de-Randon, former commune in the Lozère department in southern France
- Signal de Randon, the highest summit of Margeride in the Massif Central, France

== People with the given name ==
- Randon Fontenette (born 2005), American football player

== People with the surname ==
- Frederick Randon senior (1845–1883), English cricketer
- Frederick Randon junior (1873–1949), English cricketer
- Gabriel Randon, real name of the poet Jehan-Rictus (1867–1933)
- Jacques Louis Randon, 1st Comte Randon (1795–1871), French military and political leader
- Lucile Randon (1904–2023), French supercentenarian

== See also ==
- Geneviève-Françoise Randon de Malboissière, French-born poet, playwright, correspondent and multi-language translator
- Random (disambiguation)
