= Canton of Châteauneuf-de-Randon =

Coordinates: 44°39′19″N 3°40′56″E

Châteauneuf-de-Randon
- Former canton
- Interactive map of Châteauneuf-de-Randon
- Country: France
- Region: Occitania
- Department: Lozère
- No. of communes: {{{nbcomm}}}
- Disbanded: 2015
- Area: 243.17 km^{2} (93.89 sq mi)
- Population (2012): 1,694
  - Density: 6.966/km^{2} (18.04/sq mi)

The canton of Châteauneuf-de-Randon is a former canton of France, located in the Lozère department, in the Languedoc-Roussillon region. It had 1,694 inhabitants (2012). It was disbanded following the French canton reorganisation which came into effect in March 2015. It consisted of 8 communes, which joined the canton of Grandrieu in 2015.

== Communes ==
The canton of Châteauneuf-de-Randon covered 8 communes:

- Châteauneuf-de-Randon (chief town)
- Chaudeyrac
- Arzenc-de-Randon
- Pierrefiche
- Saint-Jean-la-Fouillouse
- Montbel
- Laubert
- Saint-Sauveur-de-Ginestoux

== Population ==
Evolution of the population of the canton of Châteauneuf-de-Randon
1999	1990	1982	1975	1968	1962	1954	1936	1931	1921	1911	1901	1891	1881
1,632	1,622	1,862	2,023	2,144	2,436	2,588	3,628	3,721	4,228	4,938	5,031	4,882	5,134
(1999-1962: population without double counting - 1954-1881: total population)
