= Boschman =

Boschman is a Dutch and Mennonite surname. It may refer to:

- Dick Boschman (born 1974), Dutch sports shooter
- Eric Boschman (born 1964), Belgian sommelier
- Laurie Boschman (born 1960), Canadian Canadian retired professional ice hockey centre
