= Saint-Symphorien, Lozère =

Saint-Symphorien
- Part of Bel-Air-Val-d'Ance
- Coat of arms
- Location of Saint-Symphorien
- Location within France Location within Occitanie
- Coordinates: 44°50′26″N 3°37′31″E
- Country: France
- Region: Occitania
- Department: Lozère
- Arrondissement: Mende
- Canton: Grandrieu
- Commune: Bel-Air-Val-d'Ance
- Area^{1}: 33.28 km^{2} (12.85 sq mi)
- Elevation: 1,230 m (4,040 ft)
- Highest elevation: 1,237 m (4,058 ft)
- Lowest elevation: 948 m (3,110 ft)
- Population (2022): 245
  - Density: 7.36/km^{2} (19.1/sq mi)
- Time zone: UTC+01:00 (CET)
  - Summer (DST): UTC+02:00 (CEST)
- Postal code: 48600
- ^{1} French Land Register data, which excludes lakes, ponds, glaciers > 1 km^{2} (0.386 sq mi or 247 acres) and river estuaries.

Saint-Symphorien (French pronunciation: [sɛ̃ sɛ̃fɔʁjɛ̃]; Occitan: Sent Eferian) is a former commune in the Lozère department in southern France. On 1 January 2019, it was merged into the new commune Bel-Air-Val-d'Ance.

== See also ==
- Communes of the Lozère department
