= Chambon-le-Château =

- Part of Bel-Air-Val-d'Ance
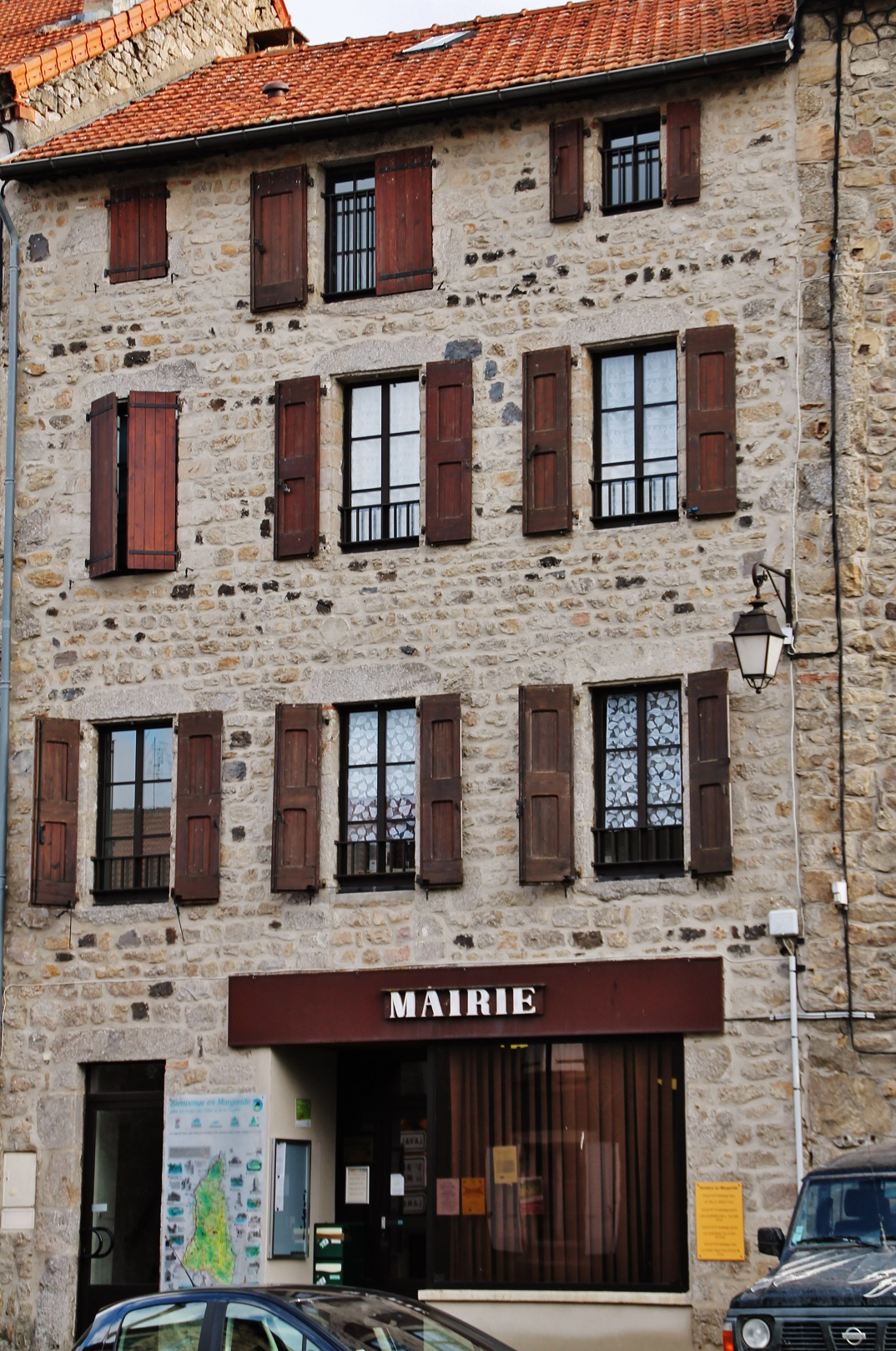
- The town hall in Chambon-le-Château
- Location of Chambon-le-Château
- Location within France Location within Occitanie
- Coordinates: 44°51′14″N 3°39′37″E
- Country: France
- Region: Occitania
- Department: Lozère
- Arrondissement: Mende
- Canton: Grandrieu
- Commune: Bel-Air-Val-d'Ance
- Area^{1}: 8.12 km^{2} (3.14 sq mi)
- Elevation: 1,000 m (3,300 ft)
- Highest elevation: 1,153 m (3,783 ft)
- Lowest elevation: 891 m (2,923 ft)
- Population (2022): 295
  - Density: 36.3/km^{2} (94.1/sq mi)
- Time zone: UTC+01:00 (CET)
  - Summer (DST): UTC+02:00 (CEST)
- Postal code: 48600
- ^{1} French Land Register data, which excludes lakes, ponds, glaciers > 1 km^{2} (0.386 sq mi or 247 acres) and river estuaries.

Chambon-le-Château (French pronunciation: [ʃɑ̃bɔ̃ lə ʃato]; Occitan: Lo Chambon del Chastèl) is a former commune in the Lozère department in southern France. On 1 January 2019, it was merged into the new commune Bel-Air-Val-d'Ance.

== See also ==
- Communes of the Lozère department
