= Atger =

Atger may refer to:

- Laval-Atger, a former French commune
- Virginie Atger (born 1984), French equestrian
- Stéphanie Atger (born 1975), French politician
