= La Villedieu =

Villedieu is the name of several communes in France:

- La Villedieu, Charente-Maritime, in the Charente-Maritime département
- La Villedieu, Creuse, in the Creuse département
- La Villedieu, Lozère, in the Lozère département
- La Villedieu-du-Clain, in the Vienne département
- La Villedieu-en-Fontenette, in the Haute-Saône département
- La Ville-Dieu-du-Temple, in the Tarn-et-Garonne département

== See also ==
- Villedieu (disambiguation)
