= Auroux =

- Commune
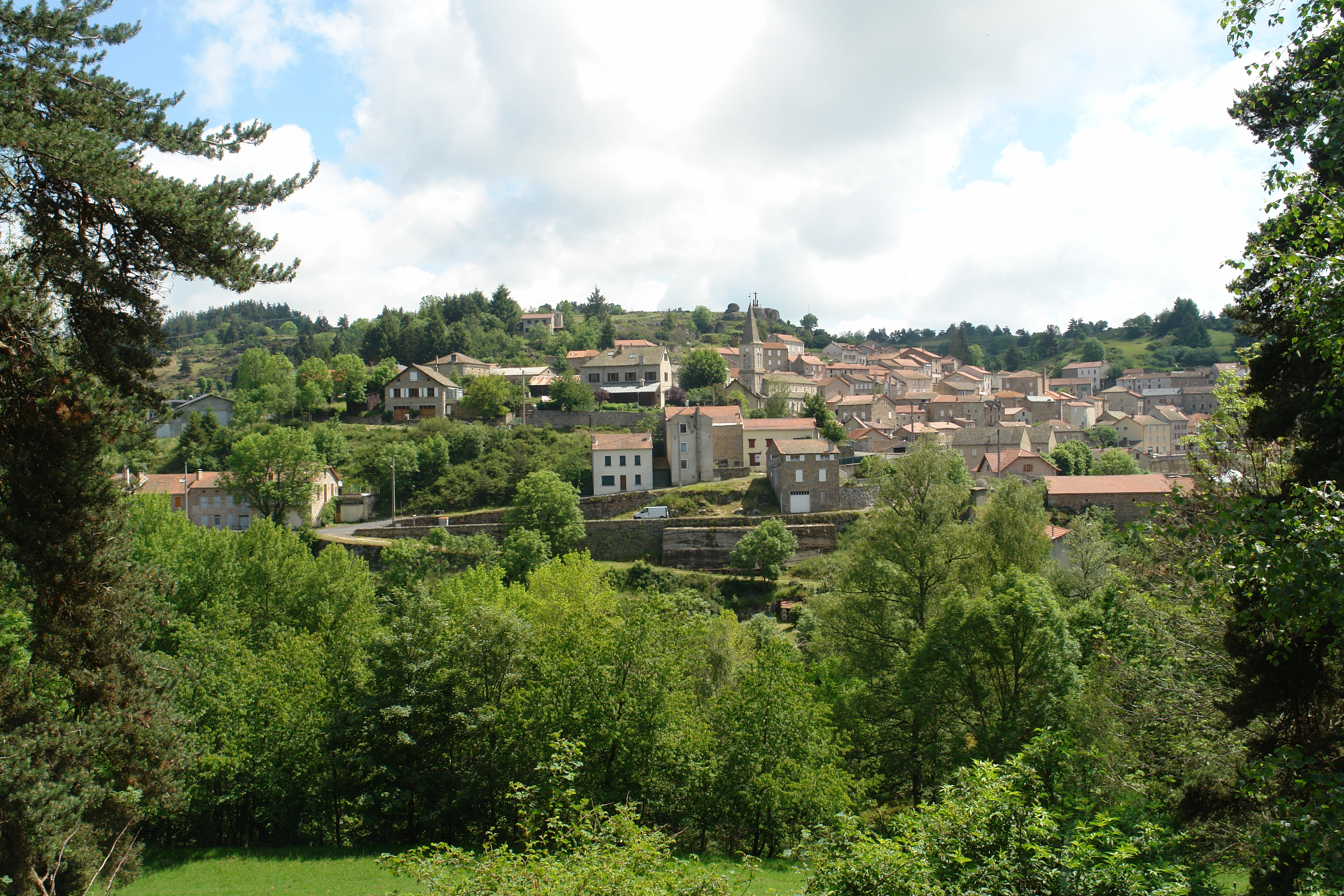
- A general view of Auroux

- Coat of arms
- Location of Auroux
- Location within France Location within Occitanie
- Coordinates: 44°45′13″N 3°43′41″E
- Country: France
- Region: Occitania
- Department: Lozère
- Arrondissement: Mende
- Canton: Langogne
- Intercommunality: CC Haut Allier Margeride

Government
  - Mayor (2020–2026): Anne-Marie Pijeau
- Area^{1}: 35.09 km^{2} (13.55 sq mi)
- Elevation: 950 m (3,120 ft)
- Highest elevation: 1,271 m (4,170 ft)
- Lowest elevation: 909 m (2,982 ft)
- Population (2023): 364
  - Density: 10.4/km^{2} (26.9/sq mi)
- Time zone: UTC+01:00 (CET)
  - Summer (DST): UTC+02:00 (CEST)
- INSEE/Postal code: 48010 /48600
- ^{1} French Land Register data, which excludes lakes, ponds, glaciers > 1 km^{2} (0.386 sq mi or 247 acres) and river estuaries.

Auroux (French pronunciation: [oʁu]; Occitan: Aurós) is a commune in the Lozère department in southern France.

== Geography ==
The Chapeauroux forms part of the commune's southern border, flows north through the middle of the commune, then forms part of its northern border.

== Population ==
Historical population
Year	Pop.	±% p.a.
1968	561	—
1975	504	−1.52%
1982	438	−1.99%
1990	395	−1.28%
1999	380	−0.43%
2007	440	+1.85%
2012	423	−0.78%
2017	385	−1.86%
2023	364	−0.93%
Source: INSEE

== See also ==
- Communes of the Lozère department
