= Eric Boschman =

Belgian sommelier (born 1964)

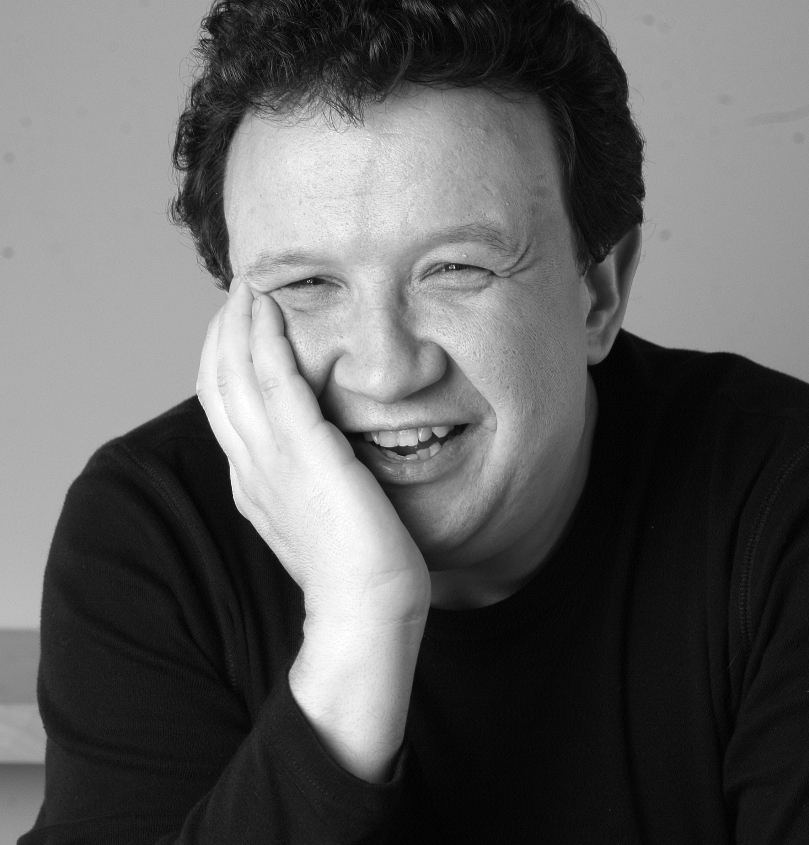
- Born: August 24, 1964
- Education: Diploma from Namur College of Catering and Hotel Management
- Notable work: Sommelier (wine adviser)

Eric Boschman (born 25 August 1964) is a Belgian sommelier. He has been awarded many prizes, including the title of "Best Sommelier in Belgium" in 1988. He is a respected expert on wine from Belgium, and shares his passion through various media (newspapers and magazines, radio and television) and by organizing events.

== Career ==
Eric Boschman grew up in the world of gastronomy. His grandparents, Charles and Claire Boschman, opened the Restaurant "Le Luxembourg" in Charleroi in 1948, and his parents, Jacques Boschman and Claudine Fabre, first opened "Le Roi des Belges" in Anderlues, then, when Eric was 10 years old, "Le Grand Ryeu", at Grandrieu. Eric was educated at secondary school in Beaumont and then at the College of Catering and Hotel Management at Namur, followed by a one-year training placement in Strasbourg, France. On his return to Belgium, he began his career as a commis chef at "Barbizon", moving on to "Chez Romeyer", then "Chez Bruneau" and finally "L’Oasis". In 1992, he opened his own restaurant "Le Pain et Le Vin" which he later sold and set up the Food and Wine Academy (FAWA). Today he spends most of his time offering advice on events, then organising them, all over the world. At the same time, he is involved in writing, publishing and the media, including producing many food television programmes, often in the form of culinary and gastronomic advice shows.

== Sommelier ==
Eric Boschman was given his enthusiasm for wine by two passionate sommeliers, Simon Decloux and André Leroy. He studied wine and entered many wine competitions and contests. He was crowned "Best Sommelier in Belgium" in 1988. He tries to talk about wine like a storyteller. Today he makes presentations about wine to radio and television audiences, just like he used to do in restaurants. He also works as a wine consultant for many clients, including the Yas Marina Hotel in Abu Dhabi.

== Media personality ==
Eric Boschman appears regularly on radio and television and his columns appear in several newspapers and magazines. He is usually billed as a gastronomic expert, but always remains detached and humorous. Newspapers and magazines he writes for include "La Dernière Heure", "Moustique" and "Femmes d'aujourd'hui". On the radio, he has been a contributor to "Laissez-moi dormir" on the Bel RTL channel since 2008. He appears in the television programmes "Père et Fils"and "Sans Chichi"as the character Monsieur Oenophile. He has also been involved in promoting and advertising Walloon produce.

== Writer ==
Eric Boschman is also an accomplished wine writer. In addition to his columns and articles in "La Dernière Heure" and "Femmes d’aujourd’hui", he has also written several books on wine, including several wine guides and a book on traditional home cooking, published by Racine. These publications demonstrate Boschman’s hedonistic character, as well as his desire to share his passion for wine.

== Awards and prizes ==
- 1982: Master Cheesemonger SOPEXA.
- 1988: Best Maître d'hôtel in Belgium.
- 1989: Master Sommelier (French wine) SOPEXA.
- 1989: Best Sommelier in Belgium (awarded by the Belgian Guild of Sommeliers)
- 1990: Ruinart Prize (representing Belgium).
- 1990: Semi-Finalist in European Ruinart Trophy contest.
- 1992 : Semi-Finalist in the ASI World Sommelier Contest in Brazil
- 1994: First Master of Wine award.
- 2008 : Fourth Prize winner at the Habanos World Sommelier Championships in Cuba
- 2008: First Prize in the Lanson-Fijev Awards from the Belgian wine writers’ association.
- 2010: Fifth Prize and Finalist in the Habanos World Sommelier Championships in Cuba.

== Bibliography ==
- "La Novice et le Sommelier", 2000, La Renaissance du Livre
- "Le Monde à Table" (nine volumes) 2004, Paperview (with Christelle Verheyden)
- World Cuisines: South-East Asia, 2004, Paperview (with Christelle Verheyden)
- World Cuisines: China and Japan, 2004, Paperview (with Christelle Verheyden)
- "Le Goût des Belges", Volume 1 2006, Volume II 2007, Racine, (with Nathalie Derny and Sven Laurent)
- "La Cuisine des Boschman: une histoire de famille" 2009, Luc Pire (with his father Jacques Boschman and his brother Alain Boschman).
- Belgian Wines, 2009, Racine.
- "Solidement Boschman" 2009, La Renaissance du Livre (awarded an International Gourmet Cookbook Award)
