= Chapeauroux =

River in France

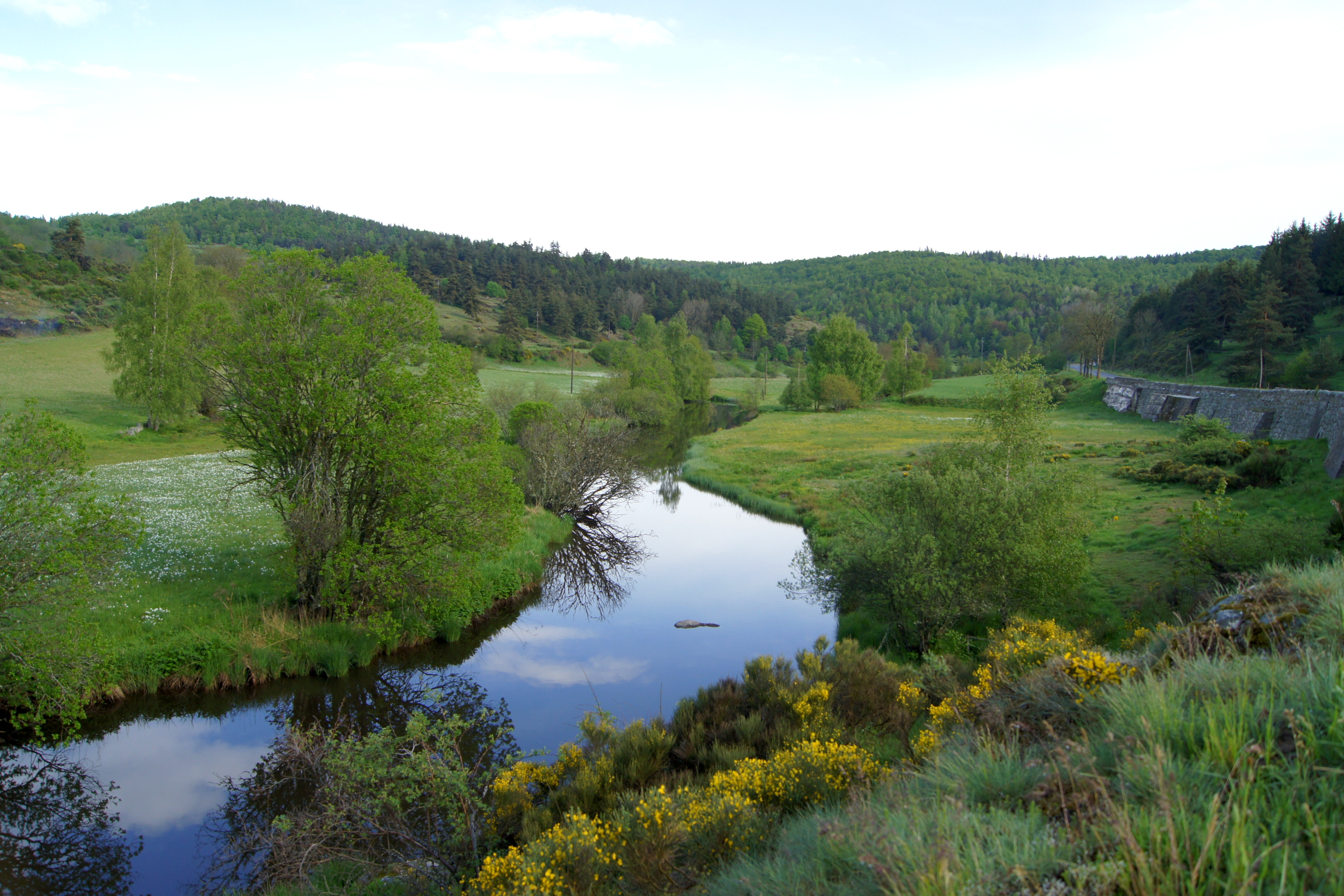

- Location within France Location within Auvergne-Rhône-Alpes

Location
- Country: France

Physical characteristics
- Source
  - location: Estables
  - coordinates: 44°39′51″N 03°32′34″E
  - elevation: 1,460 m (4,790 ft)
- Mouth
  - location: Allier
  - coordinates: 44°50′23″N 03°44′07″E
  - elevation: 740 m (2,430 ft)
- Length: 56.1 km (34.9 mi)
- Basin size: 387 km^{2} (149 sq mi)
- Discharge
  - average: 3.36 m^{3}/s (119 cu ft/s)

Basin features
- Progression: Allier→ Loire→ Atlantic Ocean

The Chapeauroux (French pronunciation: [ʃapoʁu]) is a 56.1-kilometre (34.9 mi) long river in the Lozère and Haute-Loire départements, south-central France. Its source is near Estables, in the Margeride. It flows generally northeast. It is a left tributary of the Allier into which it flows between Saint-Bonnet-de-Montauroux and Saint-Christophe-d'Allier.

== Départements and communes along its course ==
This list is ordered from source to mouth:

- Lozère: Estables, Arzenc-de-Randon, Châteauneuf-de-Randon, Pierrefiche, Saint-Jean-la-Fouillouse, Chastanier, Auroux, Grandrieu, Laval-Atger, Saint-Bonnet-de-Montauroux
- Haute-Loire: Saint-Christophe-d'Allier
