= Villedieu =

Villedieu is the name or part of the name of several communes in France:

- Villedieu, Cantal, in the Cantal département
- Villedieu, Côte-d'Or, in the Côte-d'Or département
- Villedieu, Vaucluse, in the Vaucluse département
- Villedieu-la-Blouère, in the Maine-et-Loire département
- Villedieu-le-Château, in the Loir-et-Cher département
- Villedieu-lès-Bailleul, in the Orne département
- Villedieu-les-Poêles, in the Manche département, best known for producing copper cookware
- Villedieu-sur-Indre, in the Indre département
- Les Villedieu, in the Doubs département

Villedieu may also refer to:

- Marie-Catherine de Villedieu, a 17th-century French author.

== See also ==
- La Villedieu (disambiguation)
