= Servières =

- Part of Monts-de-Randon
- Location of Servières
- Location within France Location within Occitanie
- Coordinates: 44°34′33″N 3°24′20″E
- Country: France
- Region: Occitania
- Department: Lozère
- Arrondissement: Mende
- Canton: Marvejols
- Commune: Monts-de-Randon
- Area^{1}: 19.38 km^{2} (7.48 sq mi)
- Elevation: 1,000 m (3,300 ft)
- Highest elevation: 1,265 m (4,150 ft)
- Lowest elevation: 840 m (2,760 ft)
- Population (2022): 133
  - Density: 6.86/km^{2} (17.8/sq mi)
- Time zone: UTC+01:00 (CET)
  - Summer (DST): UTC+02:00 (CEST)
- Postal code: 48000
- ^{1} French Land Register data, which excludes lakes, ponds, glaciers > 1 km^{2} (0.386 sq mi or 247 acres) and river estuaries.

Servières (French pronunciation: [sɛʁvjɛʁ]; Occitan: Cervièira) is a former commune in the Lozère department in southern France. On 1 January 2019, it was merged into the new commune Monts-de-Randon.

== See also ==
- Communes of the Lozère department
