= Lac de Charpal =

Lake in France

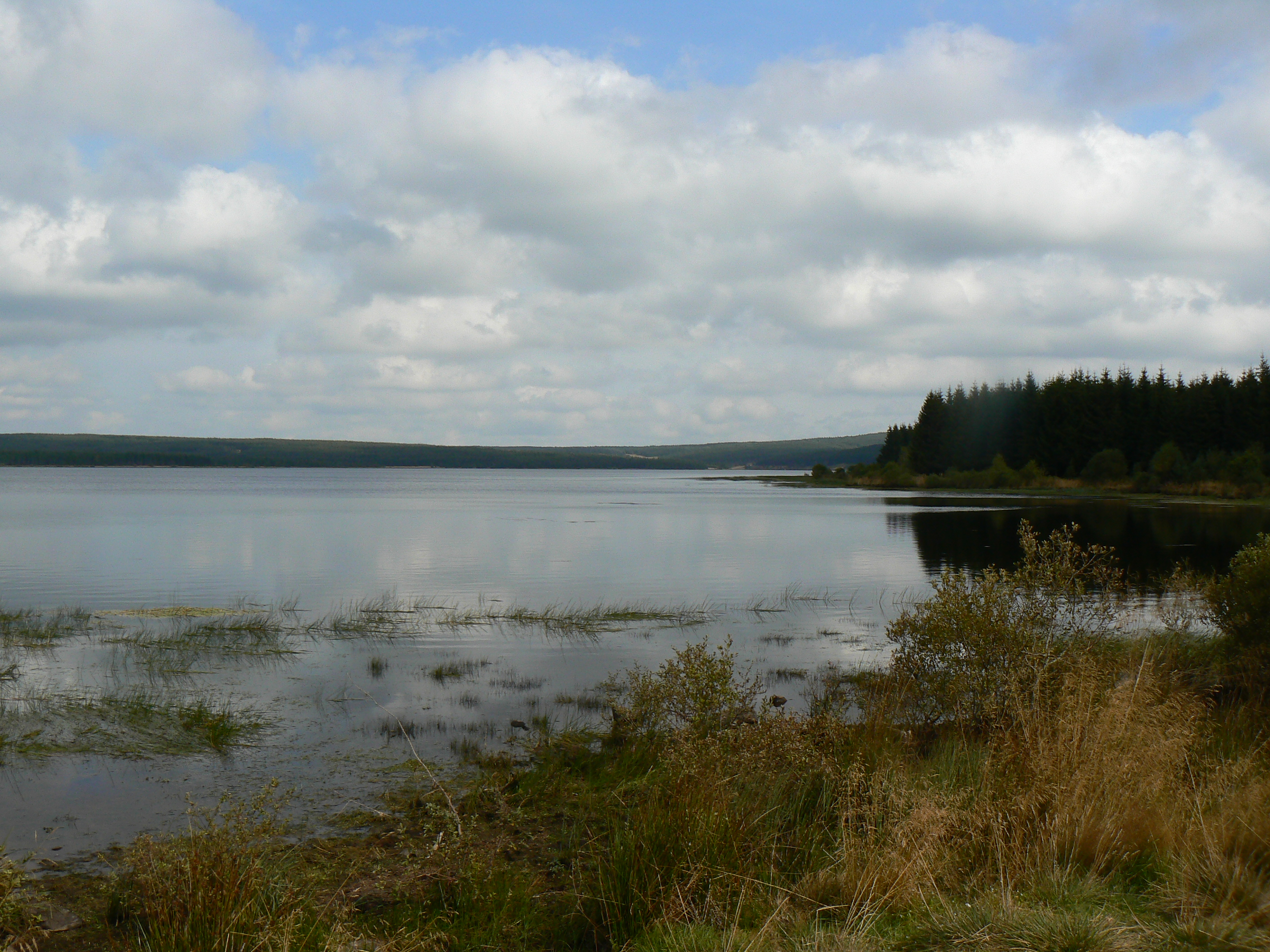

- Location within France
- Location: Lozère
- Coordinates: 44°37′N 3°34′E
- Type: artificial
- Primary inflows: Colagne
- Basin countries: France
- Surface area: 1.9 km^{2} (0.73 sq mi)
- Max. depth: 16 m (52 ft)
- Water volume: 8,250,000 m^{3} (291,000,000 cu ft)
- Surface elevation: 1,326 m (4,350 ft)
- Islands: none

Lac de Charpal is a lake in Lozère, France. At an elevation of 1326 m, its surface area is 1.9 km².

Three communes border the lake: Arzenc-de-Randon, Le Born and Rieutort-de-Randon.

The Colagne and numerous brooks feed the lake, which provides Mende and other communes with water.
