= Sainte-Hélène, Lozère =

Sainte-Hélène
- Commune
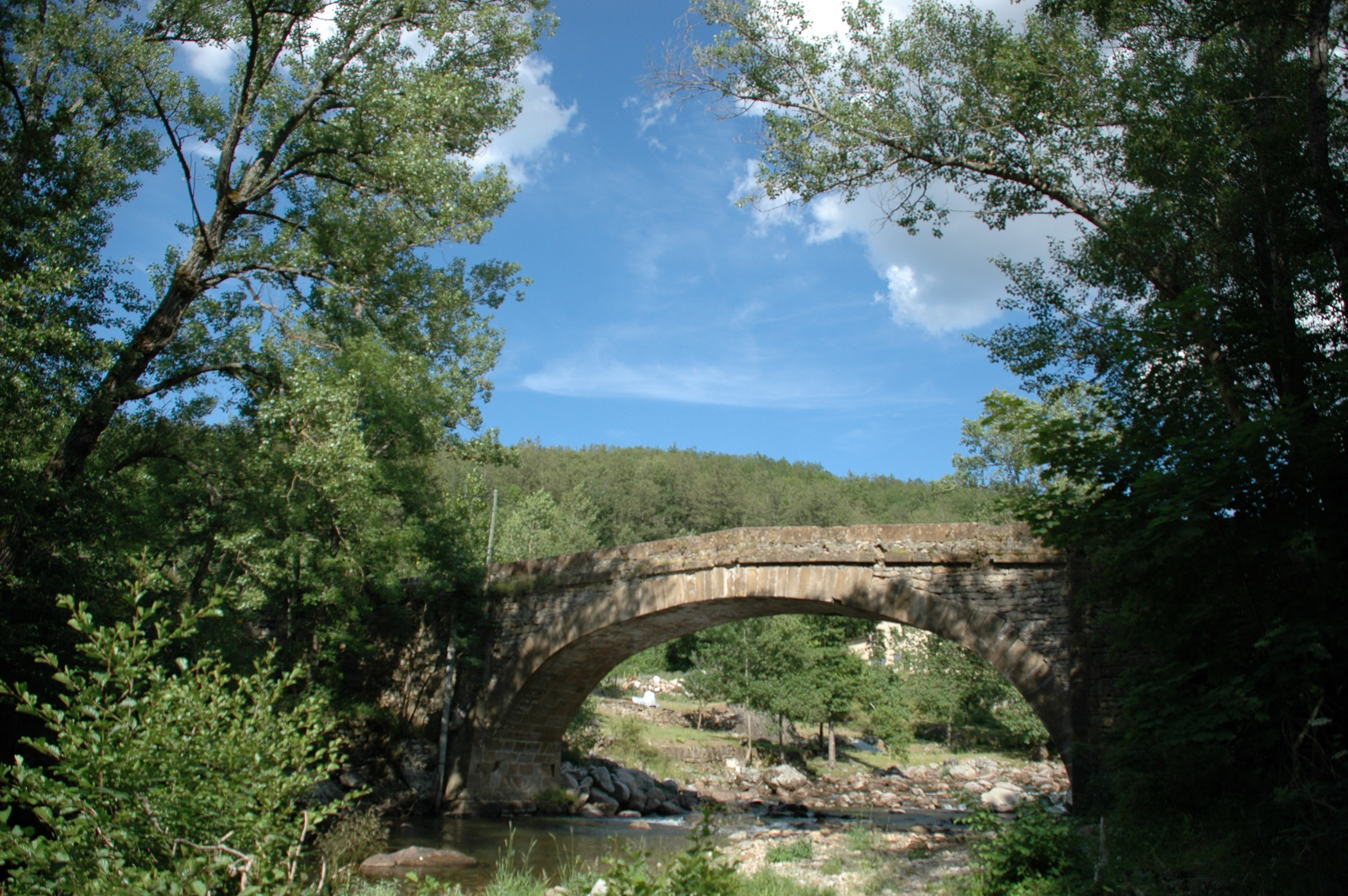
- The bridge over the River Lot, in Sainte-Hélène
- Location of Sainte-Hélène
- Location within France Location within Occitanie
- Coordinates: 44°31′12″N 3°36′13″E
- Country: France
- Region: Occitania
- Department: Lozère
- Arrondissement: Mende
- Canton: Grandrieu
- Intercommunality: CC Mont Lozère

Government
  - Mayor (2020–2026): Gérard Bonicel
- Area^{1}: 6.73 km^{2} (2.60 sq mi)
- Elevation: 900 m (3,000 ft)
- Highest elevation: 1,212 m (3,976 ft)
- Lowest elevation: 793 m (2,602 ft)
- Population (2023): 97
  - Density: 14/km^{2} (37/sq mi)
- Time zone: UTC+01:00 (CET)
  - Summer (DST): UTC+02:00 (CEST)
- INSEE/Postal code: 48157 /48190
- ^{1} French Land Register data, which excludes lakes, ponds, glaciers > 1 km^{2} (0.386 sq mi or 247 acres) and river estuaries.

Sainte-Hélène (French pronunciation: [sɛ̃t elɛn]; Occitan: Senta Alena) is a commune in the Lozère department in southern France.

== Demography ==
Historical population
Year	Pop.	±% p.a.
1968	54	—
1975	44	−2.88%
1982	44	+0.00%
1990	47	+0.83%
1999	52	+1.13%
2007	66	+3.02%
2012	71	+1.47%
2017	101	+7.30%
2023	97	−0.67%
Source: INSEE

== See also ==
- Communes of the Lozère department
