= Saint-Bonnet-de-Montauroux =

- Part of Saint-Bonnet-Laval
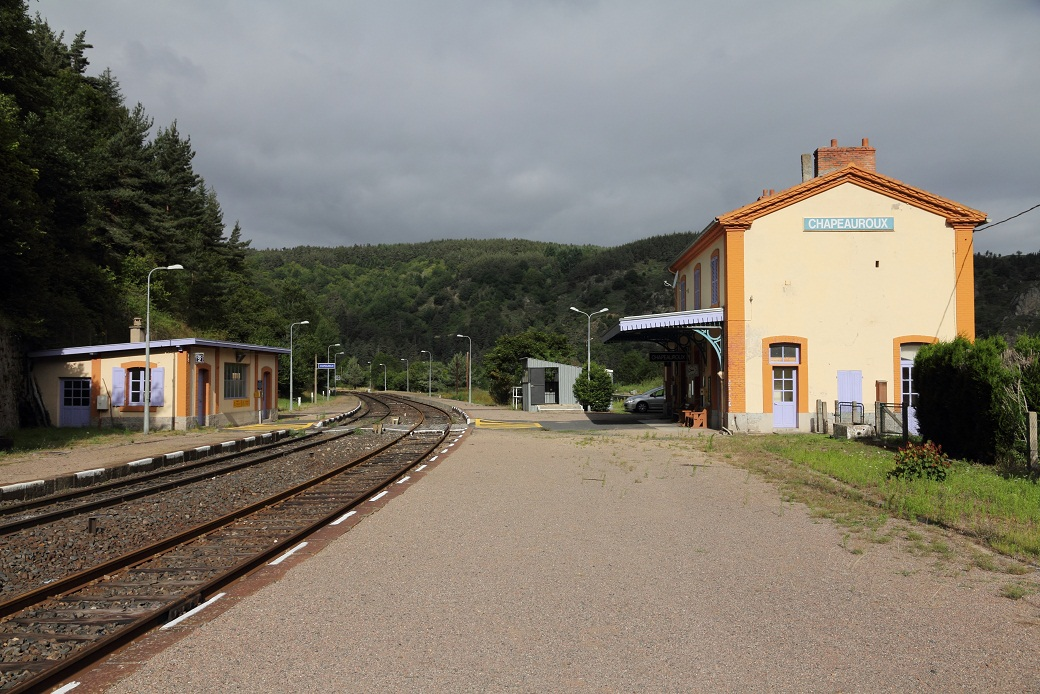
- The railway station of Saint-Bonnet-de-Montauroux

- Coat of arms
- Location of Saint-Bonnet-de-Montauroux
- Location within France Location within Occitanie
- Coordinates: 44°48′59″N 3°43′15″E
- Country: France
- Region: Occitania
- Department: Lozère
- Arrondissement: Mende
- Canton: Langogne
- Commune: Saint-Bonnet-Laval
- Area^{1}: 21.33 km^{2} (8.24 sq mi)
- Elevation: 830 m (2,720 ft)
- Highest elevation: 1,180 m (3,870 ft)
- Lowest elevation: 729 m (2,392 ft)
- Population (2022): 109
  - Density: 5.11/km^{2} (13.2/sq mi)
- Time zone: UTC+01:00 (CET)
  - Summer (DST): UTC+02:00 (CEST)
- Postal code: 48600
- ^{1} French Land Register data, which excludes lakes, ponds, glaciers > 1 km^{2} (0.386 sq mi or 247 acres) and river estuaries.

Saint-Bonnet-de-Montauroux (Occitan: Sent Bonet de Montaurós) is a former commune in the Lozère department in southern France. On 1 January 2017, it was merged into the new commune Saint-Bonnet-Laval.

== Geography ==
The Chapeauroux flows northeastward through the commune, forms part of its north-eastern border, then flows into the Allier which forms the commune's eastern border.

== See also ==
- Communes of the Lozère department
