= Arboretum de Born =

Arboretum in Languedoc-Roussillon, France

Coordinates: 44.56°N 3.56°E

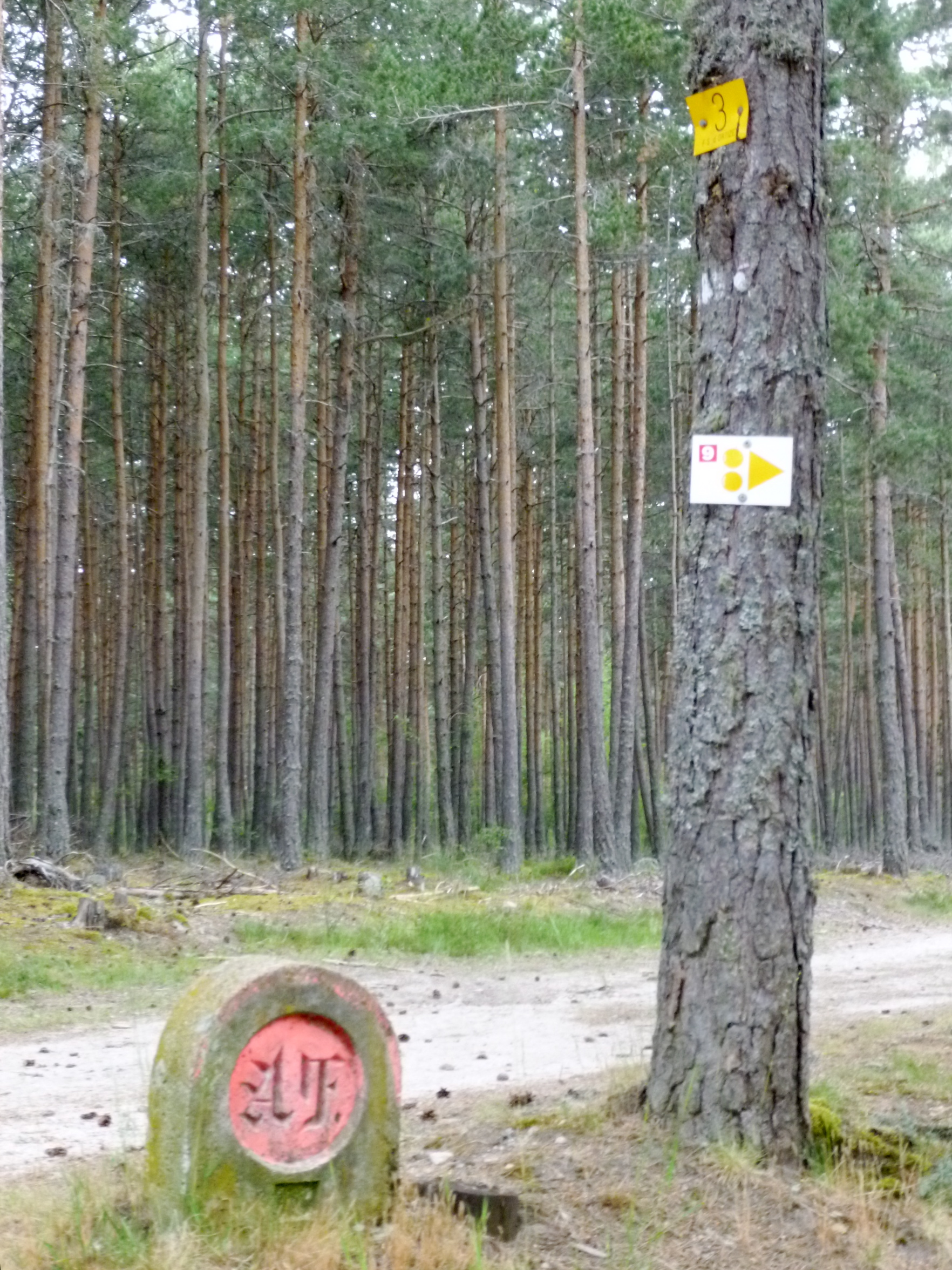
Arboretum de Born

The Arboretum de Born is a small arboretum located at 1400 metres altitude on the Plateau du Roi near Le Born, Lozère, Languedoc-Roussillon, France. It was created between 1964 and 1967 to study conifers suitable for reforestation, and according to Arbez et al., now contains 38 taxa (primarily conifers).

== See also ==
- Arboretum Curie
- List of botanical gardens in France
