= Saint-Christophe-d'Allier =

- Commune
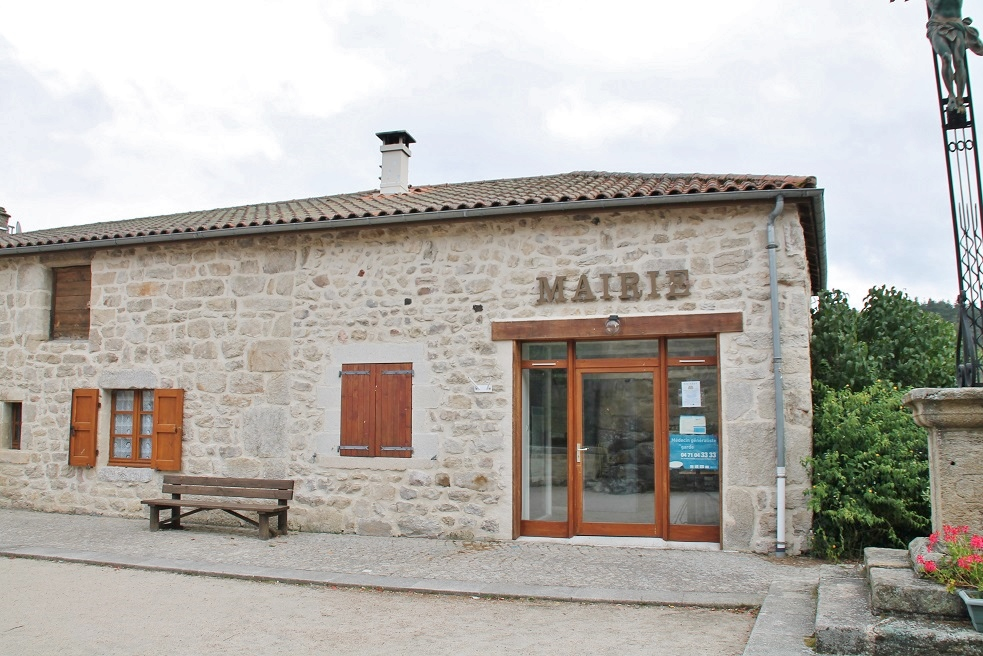
- Town hall
- Location of Saint-Christophe-d'Allier
- Location within France Location within Auvergne-Rhône-Alpes
- Coordinates: 44°51′23″N 3°42′18″E
- Country: France
- Region: Auvergne-Rhône-Alpes
- Department: Haute-Loire
- Arrondissement: Brioude
- Canton: Gorges de l'Allier-Gévaudan

Government
  - Mayor (2025–2026): Anael Meyronneinc
- Area^{1}: 19.3 km^{2} (7.5 sq mi)
- Elevation: 973 m (3,192 ft)
- Highest elevation: 1,133 m (3,717 ft)
- Lowest elevation: 689 m (2,260 ft)
- Population (2023): 83
  - Density: 4.3/km^{2} (11/sq mi)
- Time zone: UTC+01:00 (CET)
  - Summer (DST): UTC+02:00 (CEST)
- INSEE/Postal code: 43173 /43340
- ^{1} French Land Register data, which excludes lakes, ponds, glaciers > 1 km^{2} (0.386 sq mi or 247 acres) and river estuaries.

Saint-Christophe-d'Allier (French pronunciation: [sɛ̃ kʁistɔf dalje], literally Saint-Christophe of Allier; Auvergnat: Sant Cristòu d'Alèir) is a commune in the Haute-Loire department in south-central France.

== Geography ==
The Chapeauroux forms part of the commune's south-eastern border, then flows into the Allier which forms the commune's north-eastern border.

== Population ==
Historical population
Year	Pop.	±% p.a.
1968	213	—
1975	179	−2.45%
1982	164	−1.24%
1990	159	−0.39%
1999	140	−1.40%
2007	116	−2.32%
2012	95	−3.92%
2017	91	−0.86%
2023	83	−1.52%
Source: INSEE

== See also ==
- Communes of the Haute-Loire department
