= Badaroux =

- Commune
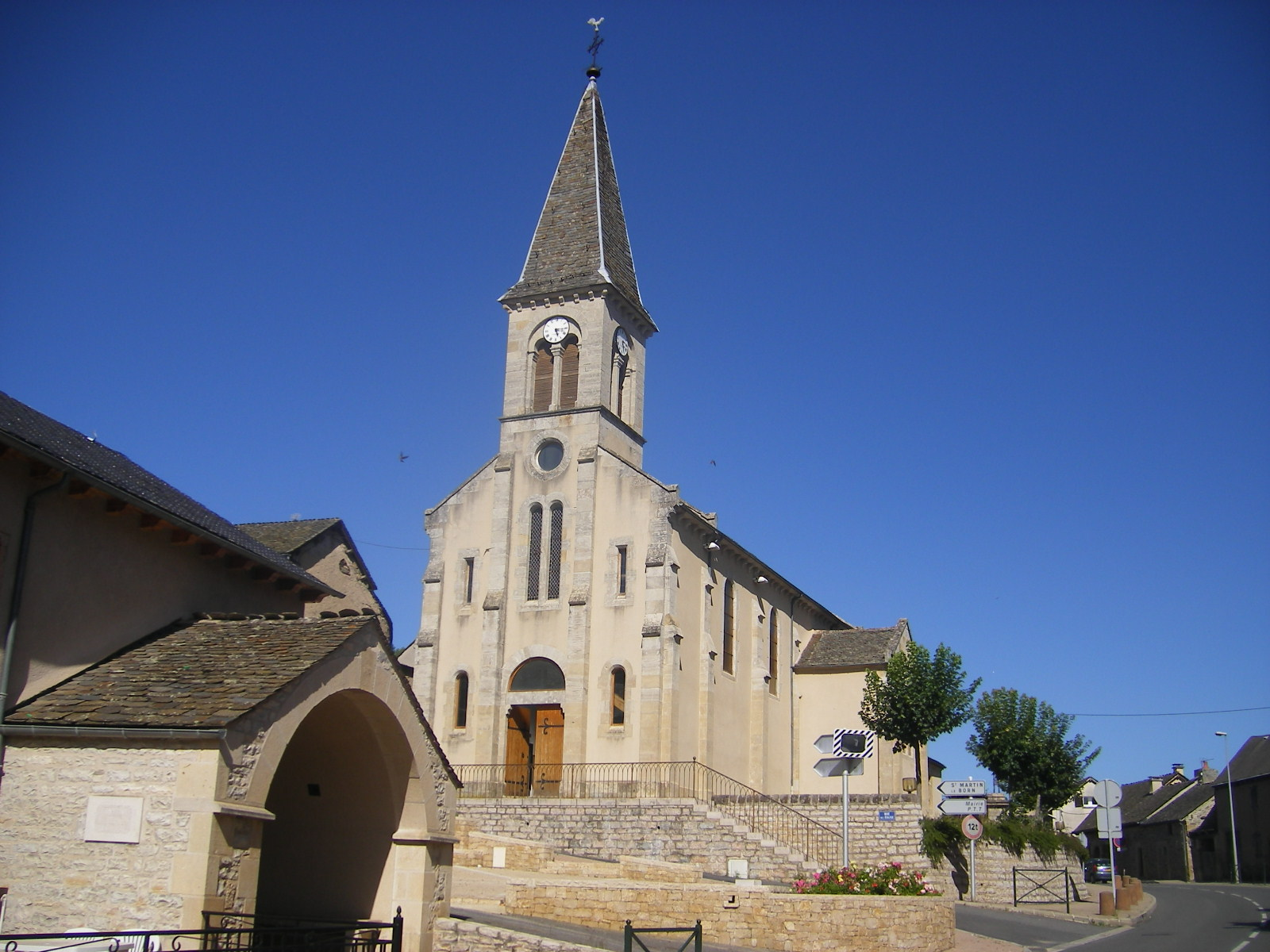
- The church in Badaroux

- Coat of arms
- Location of Badaroux
- Location within France Location within Occitanie
- Coordinates: 44°32′15″N 3°33′02″E
- Country: France
- Region: Occitania
- Department: Lozère
- Arrondissement: Mende
- Canton: Grandrieu
- Intercommunality: CC Cœur de Lozère

Government
  - Mayor (2020–2026): Valérie Vignal-Chemin
- Area^{1}: 20.72 km^{2} (8.00 sq mi)
- Elevation: 800 m (2,600 ft)
- Highest elevation: 1,220 m (4,000 ft)
- Lowest elevation: 736 m (2,415 ft)
- Population (2023): 930
  - Density: 45/km^{2} (120/sq mi)
- Time zone: UTC+01:00 (CET)
  - Summer (DST): UTC+02:00 (CEST)
- INSEE/Postal code: 48013 /48000
- ^{1} French Land Register data, which excludes lakes, ponds, glaciers > 1 km^{2} (0.386 sq mi or 247 acres) and river estuaries.

Badaroux (French pronunciation: [badaʁu]; Occitan: Badarosc) is a commune in the Lozère department in southern France.

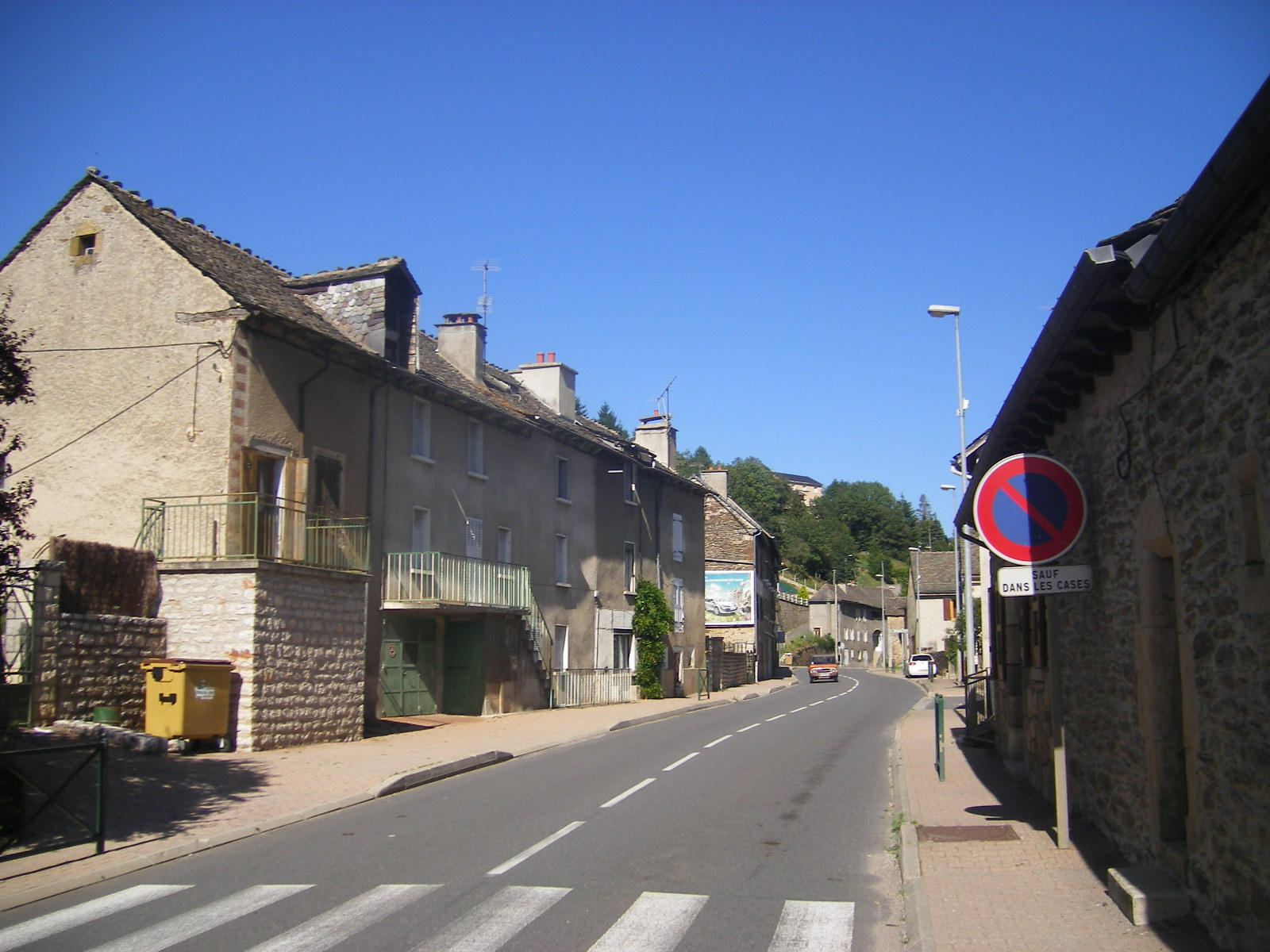

== Population ==
Historical population
Year	Pop.	±% p.a.
1968	426	—
1975	689	+7.11%
1982	939	+4.52%
1990	905	−0.46%
1999	850	−0.69%
2007	889	+0.56%
2012	941	+1.14%
2017	969	+0.59%
2023	930	−0.68%
Source: INSEE

== See also ==
- Communes of the Lozère department
