= Saint-Paul-le-Froid =

- Commune
- Location of Saint-Paul-le-Froid
- Location within France Location within Occitanie
- Coordinates: 44°47′33″N 3°34′19″E
- Country: France
- Region: Occitania
- Department: Lozère
- Arrondissement: Mende
- Canton: Grandrieu
- Intercommunality: CC Randon - Margeride

Government
  - Mayor (2020–2026): Christian Pascon
- Area^{1}: 44.17 km^{2} (17.05 sq mi)
- Elevation: 1,302 m (4,272 ft)
- Highest elevation: 1,469 m (4,820 ft)
- Lowest elevation: 1,154 m (3,786 ft)
- Population (2023): 132
  - Density: 2.99/km^{2} (7.74/sq mi)
- Time zone: UTC+01:00 (CET)
  - Summer (DST): UTC+02:00 (CEST)
- INSEE/Postal code: 48174 /48600
- ^{1} French Land Register data, which excludes lakes, ponds, glaciers > 1 km^{2} (0.386 sq mi or 247 acres) and river estuaries.

Saint-Paul-le-Froid (French pronunciation: [sɛ̃ pɔl lə fʁwa]; Occitan: Sant Pau lo Freid) is a commune in the Lozère department in southern France.

== See also ==
- Communes of the Lozère department
- Col de la Baraque des Bouviers
