= La Panouse =

- Commune
- Location of La Panouse
- Location within France Location within Occitanie
- Coordinates: 44°43′50″N 3°35′23″E
- Country: France
- Region: Occitania
- Department: Lozère
- Arrondissement: Mende
- Canton: Grandrieu
- Intercommunality: Randon Margeride

Government
  - Mayor (2020–2026): Julien Tuffery
- Area^{1}: 37.83 km^{2} (14.61 sq mi)
- Elevation: 1,260 m (4,130 ft)
- Highest elevation: 1,506 m (4,941 ft)
- Lowest elevation: 1,177 m (3,862 ft)
- Population (2023): 94
  - Density: 2.5/km^{2} (6.4/sq mi)
- Time zone: UTC+01:00 (CET)
  - Summer (DST): UTC+02:00 (CEST)
- INSEE/Postal code: 48108 /48600
- ^{1} French Land Register data, which excludes lakes, ponds, glaciers > 1 km^{2} (0.386 sq mi or 247 acres) and river estuaries.

La Panouse (French pronunciation: [la panuz]; Occitan: La Panosa) is a commune in the Lozère département in southern France.

== Points of interest ==
- Arboretum Curie

== See also ==
- Communes of the Lozère department
