= Allenc =

- Commune
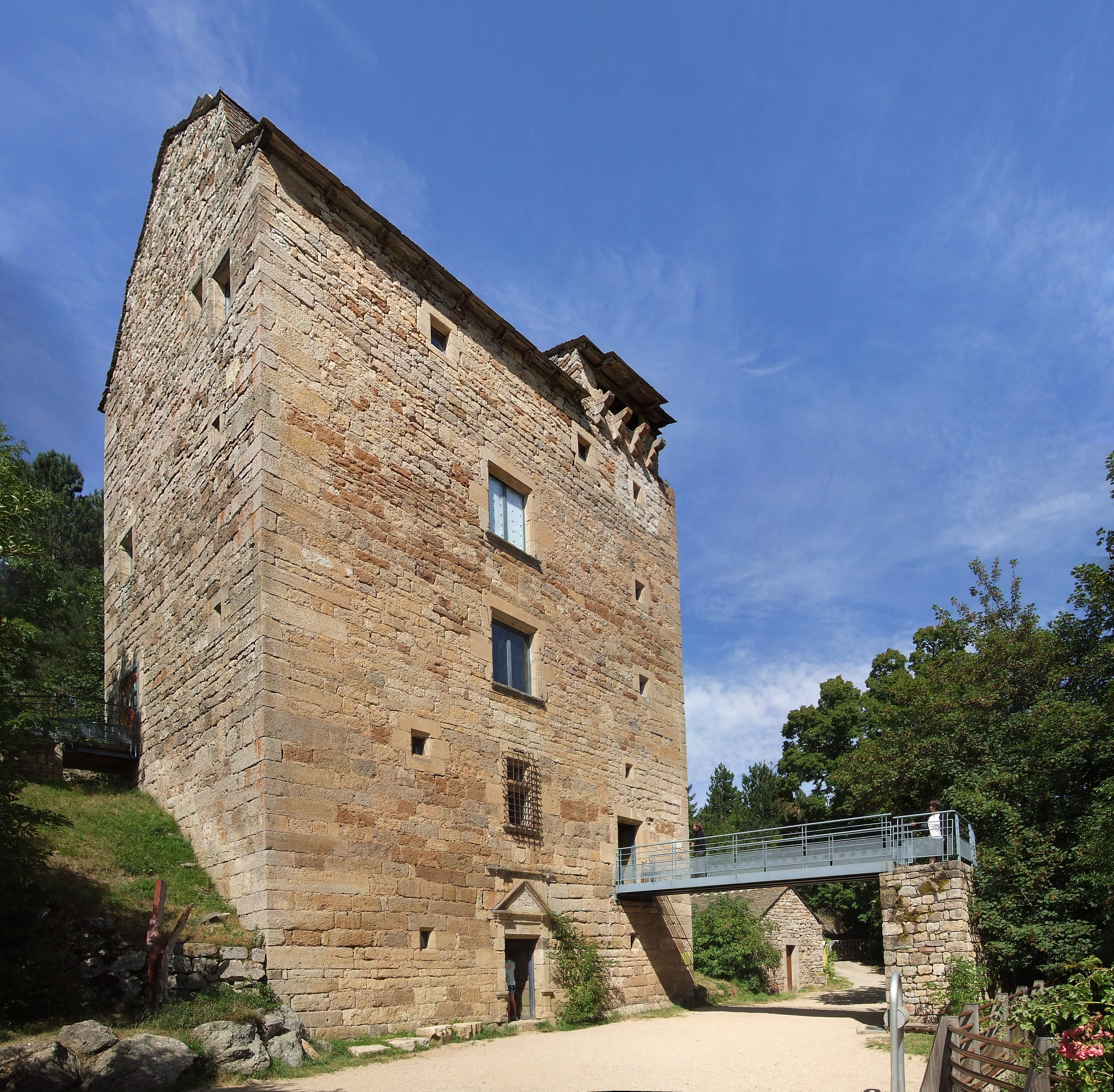
- The tower of Villaret, in Allenc
- Location of Allenc
- Location within France Location within Occitanie
- Coordinates: 44°32′30″N 3°39′43″E
- Country: France
- Region: Occitania
- Department: Lozère
- Arrondissement: Mende
- Canton: Grandrieu
- Intercommunality: CC Mont Lozère

Government
  - Mayor (2020–2026): Jean André
- Area^{1}: 38.58 km^{2} (14.90 sq mi)
- Elevation: 1,025 m (3,363 ft)
- Highest elevation: 1,326 m (4,350 ft)
- Lowest elevation: 926 m (3,038 ft)
- Population (2023): 265
  - Density: 6.87/km^{2} (17.8/sq mi)
- Time zone: UTC+01:00 (CET)
  - Summer (DST): UTC+02:00 (CEST)
- INSEE/Postal code: 48003 /48190
- ^{1} French Land Register data, which excludes lakes, ponds, glaciers > 1 km^{2} (0.386 sq mi or 247 acres) and river estuaries.

Allenc is a commune in the Lozère department in southern France. The triple divide between the Gironde, Loire, and Rhône basins lies within the commune.

== Population ==
Historical population
Year	Pop.	±% p.a.
1968	291	—
1975	237	−2.89%
1982	209	−1.78%
1990	176	−2.13%
1999	189	+0.79%
2007	237	+2.87%
2012	236	−0.08%
2017	241	+0.42%
2023	265	+1.59%
Source: INSEE

== See also ==
- Communes of the Lozère department
