= Le Born, Lozère =

Le Born
- Commune
- Location of Le Born
- Location within France Location within Occitanie
- Coordinates: 44°33′37″N 3°33′42″E
- Country: France
- Region: Occitania
- Department: Lozère
- Arrondissement: Mende
- Canton: Grandrieu
- Intercommunality: CC Cœur de Lozère

Government
  - Mayor (2020–2026): Claude Meissonnier
- Area^{1}: 30.21 km^{2} (11.66 sq mi)
- Elevation: 1,050 m (3,440 ft)
- Highest elevation: 1,437 m (4,715 ft)
- Lowest elevation: 918 m (3,012 ft)
- Population (2023): 156
  - Density: 5.16/km^{2} (13.4/sq mi)
- Time zone: UTC+01:00 (CET)
  - Summer (DST): UTC+02:00 (CEST)
- INSEE/Postal code: 48029 /48000
- ^{1} French Land Register data, which excludes lakes, ponds, glaciers > 1 km^{2} (0.386 sq mi or 247 acres) and river estuaries.

Le Born (French pronunciation: [lə bɔʁn]; Occitan: Lo Bòrn) is a commune in the Lozère department in southern France.

== Geography ==
The Colagne and the lac de Charpal form part of the commune's northern border.

== Population ==
Historical population
Year	Pop.	±% p.a.
1968	200	—
1975	162	−2.97%
1982	149	−1.19%
1990	123	−2.37%
1999	147	+2.00%
2007	154	+0.58%
2012	148	−0.79%
2017	147	−0.14%
2023	156	+1.00%
Source: INSEE

== Sights ==
- Arboretum de Born

== See also ==
- Communes of the Lozère department
