= Arboretum Curie =

Arboretum in Languedoc-Roussillon, France

Coordinates: 44.73°N 3.589°E

The Arboretum Curie, also known as the Arboretum du Col des Trois Soeurs, is a small arboretum located at 1470 metres altitude in the Col des Trois Soeurs near La Panouse, Lozère, Languedoc-Roussillon, France. It was created circa 1975 to study conifers suitable for reforestation, and according to Arbez et al., now contains 77 taxa (primarily conifers).

== See also ==
- Arboretum de Born
- List of botanical gardens in France
