= Random (disambiguation) =

Randomness is the property of lacking any sensible predictability.

Random may also refer to:

== Science and technology ==
- Random number
- Random variable
- /dev/random, a way of obtaining random numbers in operating systems
- Random (software)
- Statistical randomness, numeric sequence with recognisable pattern

== Places ==
- Random Lake, Wisconsin, US
- Random Island, Canada
- Brighton, Vermont, US, formerly known as Random
- Random Hills, Victoria Land, Antarctica

== Music ==
- Random (band)
- "Random" (Lady Sovereign song), a 2004 song by Lady Sovereign
- "Random" (G-Eazy song), a 2015 song by G-Eazy
- "Random", a song by Gary Numan released as a bonus track on his album The Pleasure Principle
- "Random", a song from the 311 album by the band 311
- Random (album), Random (02), tribute albums to Gary Numan
- Random, a 2017 album by Charly García

== People ==
- Ida Random (born 1945), American production designer
- Bob Random (born 1943), Canadian actor
- Random (musician)
- Random (rapper), Italian rapper and singer

=== Fictional characters ===
- Random (comics), a character in the Marvel Universe
- Random, a character of The Chronicles of Amber, in the novels of Roger Zelazny
- Random Dent, a character in the Hitchhikers Guide book Mostly Harmless
- Random Hajile, also known as Randam, a character in the Snatcher video game
- J. Random Hacker
- Lobster Random

== See also ==
- Random House, a book publisher
- Randon (disambiguation)
- Non sequitur (disambiguation)
