= Estables =

- Part of Monts-de-Randon
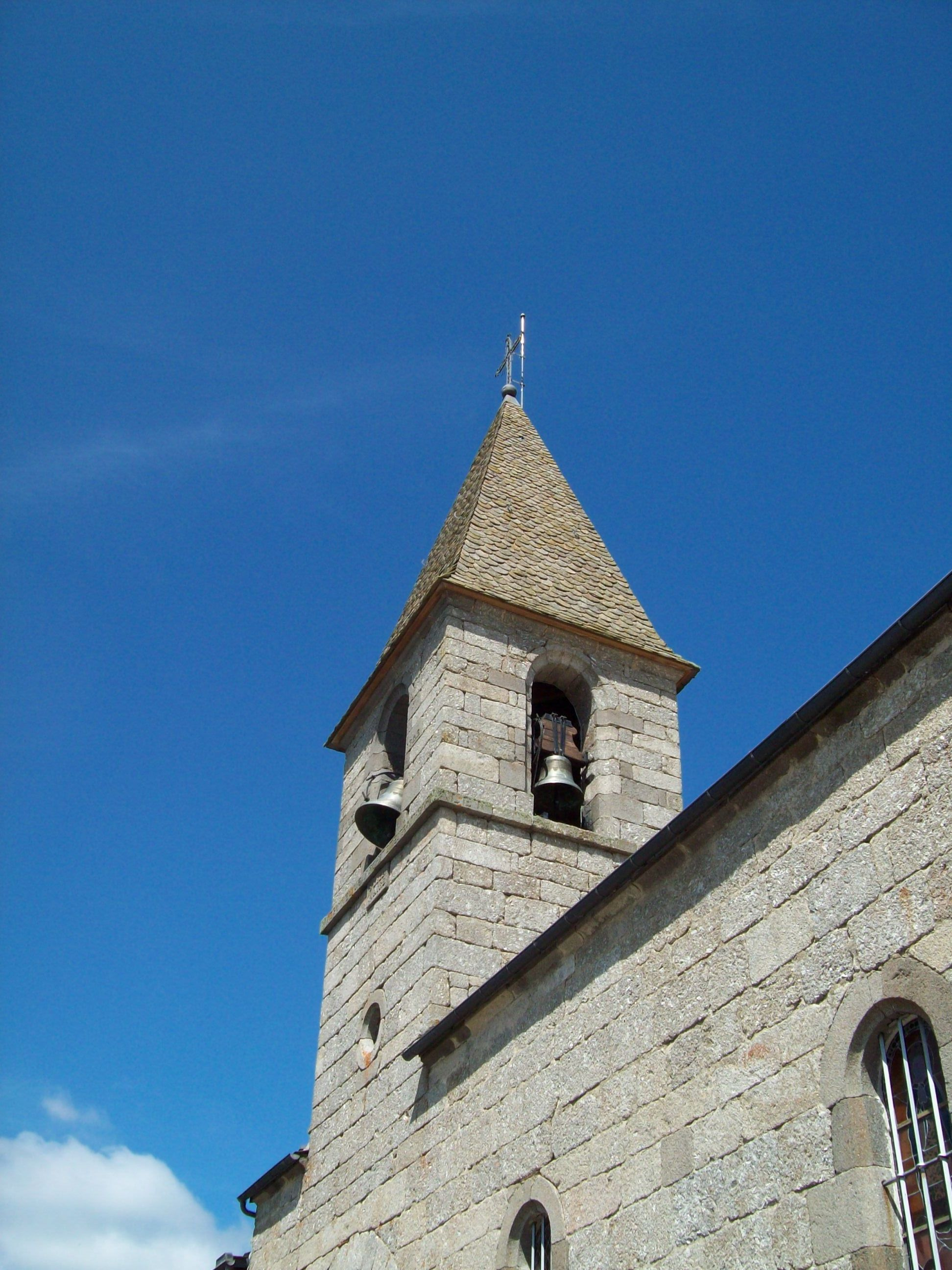
- The bell tower of the church in Estables
- Location of Estables
- Location within France Location within Occitanie
- Coordinates: 44°40′11″N 3°29′16″E
- Country: France
- Region: Occitania
- Department: Lozère
- Arrondissement: Mende
- Canton: Saint-Alban-sur-Limagnole
- Commune: Monts-de-Randon
- Area^{1}: 32.89 km^{2} (12.70 sq mi)
- Elevation: 1,200 m (3,900 ft)
- Highest elevation: 1,553 m (5,095 ft)
- Lowest elevation: 1,090 m (3,580 ft)
- Population (2022): 149
  - Density: 4.53/km^{2} (11.7/sq mi)
- Time zone: UTC+01:00 (CET)
  - Summer (DST): UTC+02:00 (CEST)
- Postal code: 48700
- ^{1} French Land Register data, which excludes lakes, ponds, glaciers > 1 km^{2} (0.386 sq mi or 247 acres) and river estuaries.

Estables (French pronunciation: [ɛstabl]) is a village and former commune in the Lozère department in southern France. On 1 January 2019, it was merged into the new commune Monts-de-Randon.

== Geography ==
The river Chapeauroux has its source in the commune's south-eastern part.

=== Climate ===
Climate data for Estables, 1552m (1991–2020 normals)
Month	Jan	Feb	Mar	Apr	May	Jun	Jul	Aug	Sep	Oct	Nov	Dec	Year
Record high °C (°F)	16.6 (61.9)	16.8 (62.2)	17.6 (63.7)	21.1 (70.0)	24.4 (75.9)	31.2 (88.2)	29.7 (85.5)	29.9 (85.8)	25.4 (77.7)	20.5 (68.9)	17.5 (63.5)	16.0 (60.8)	31.2 (88.2)
Mean daily maximum °C (°F)	0.4 (32.7)	0.4 (32.7)	4.3 (39.7)	8.6 (47.5)	11.6 (52.9)	16.5 (61.7)	19.5 (67.1)	19.4 (66.9)	15.0 (59.0)	10.1 (50.2)	4.8 (40.6)	2.3 (36.1)	9.4 (48.9)
Daily mean °C (°F)	−2 (28)	−2.3 (27.9)	1.1 (34.0)	4.7 (40.5)	7.5 (45.5)	12.1 (53.8)	14.8 (58.6)	14.7 (58.5)	11.0 (51.8)	6.9 (44.4)	2.4 (36.3)	−0.2 (31.6)	5.9 (42.6)
Mean daily minimum °C (°F)	−4.4 (24.1)	−5 (23)	−2.1 (28.2)	0.7 (33.3)	3.4 (38.1)	7.7 (45.9)	10.1 (50.2)	10.0 (50.0)	7.0 (44.6)	3.7 (38.7)	0.0 (32.0)	−2.8 (27.0)	2.4 (36.3)
Record low °C (°F)	−15.4 (4.3)	−20.8 (−5.4)	−15 (5)	−9.7 (14.5)	−6.4 (20.5)	−0.7 (30.7)	2.2 (36.0)	2.2 (36.0)	−2.3 (27.9)	−9.8 (14.4)	−11.4 (11.5)	−16 (3)	−20.8 (−5.4)
Average precipitation mm (inches)	63.6 (2.50)	53.4 (2.10)	55.5 (2.19)	78.7 (3.10)	101.1 (3.98)	81.1 (3.19)	70.7 (2.78)	65.7 (2.59)	66.4 (2.61)	92.1 (3.63)	116.4 (4.58)	66.5 (2.62)	911.2 (35.87)
Average precipitation days (≥ 1.0 mm)	11.2	10.5	10.1	11.0	11.6	8.9	8.0	7.5	7.7	9.3	12.1	12.0	119.9
Source: Météo-France

== See also ==
- Communes of the Lozère department
