= Saint-Amans, Lozère =

Saint-Amans
- Part of Monts-de-Randon
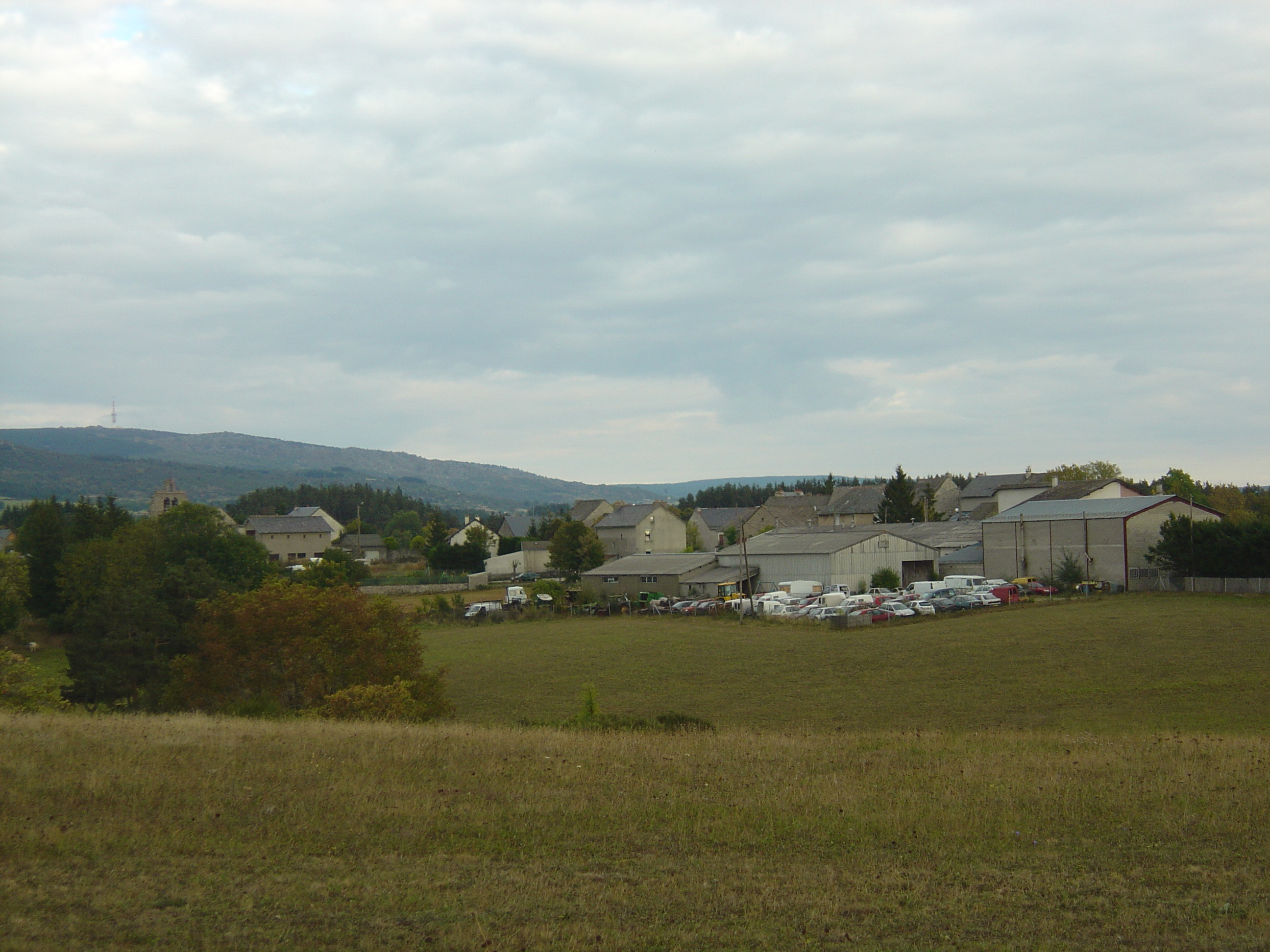
- General view of the village of Saint-Amans, with the Truc de Fortunio to the background left

- Coat of arms
- Location of Saint-Amans
- Location within France Location within Occitanie
- Coordinates: 44°39′50″N 3°27′03″E
- Country: France
- Region: Occitania
- Department: Lozère
- Arrondissement: Mende
- Canton: Saint-Alban-sur-Limagnole
- Commune: Monts-de-Randon
- Area^{1}: 9.98 km^{2} (3.85 sq mi)
- Elevation: 1,140 m (3,740 ft)
- Highest elevation: 1,264 m (4,147 ft)
- Lowest elevation: 1,050 m (3,440 ft)
- Population (2022): 170
  - Density: 17/km^{2} (44/sq mi)
- Time zone: UTC+01:00 (CET)
  - Summer (DST): UTC+02:00 (CEST)
- Postal code: 48700
- ^{1} French Land Register data, which excludes lakes, ponds, glaciers > 1 km^{2} (0.386 sq mi or 247 acres) and river estuaries.

Saint-Amans (French pronunciation: [sɛ̃t‿amɑ̃]; Occitan: Sench Amanç) is a former commune in the Lozère department in southern France. On 1 January 2019, it was merged into the new commune Monts-de-Randon.

== Geography ==
The Colagne flows westward through the southern part of the commune.

== See also ==
- Communes of the Lozère department
