= Bel-Air-Val-d'Ance =

- Commune
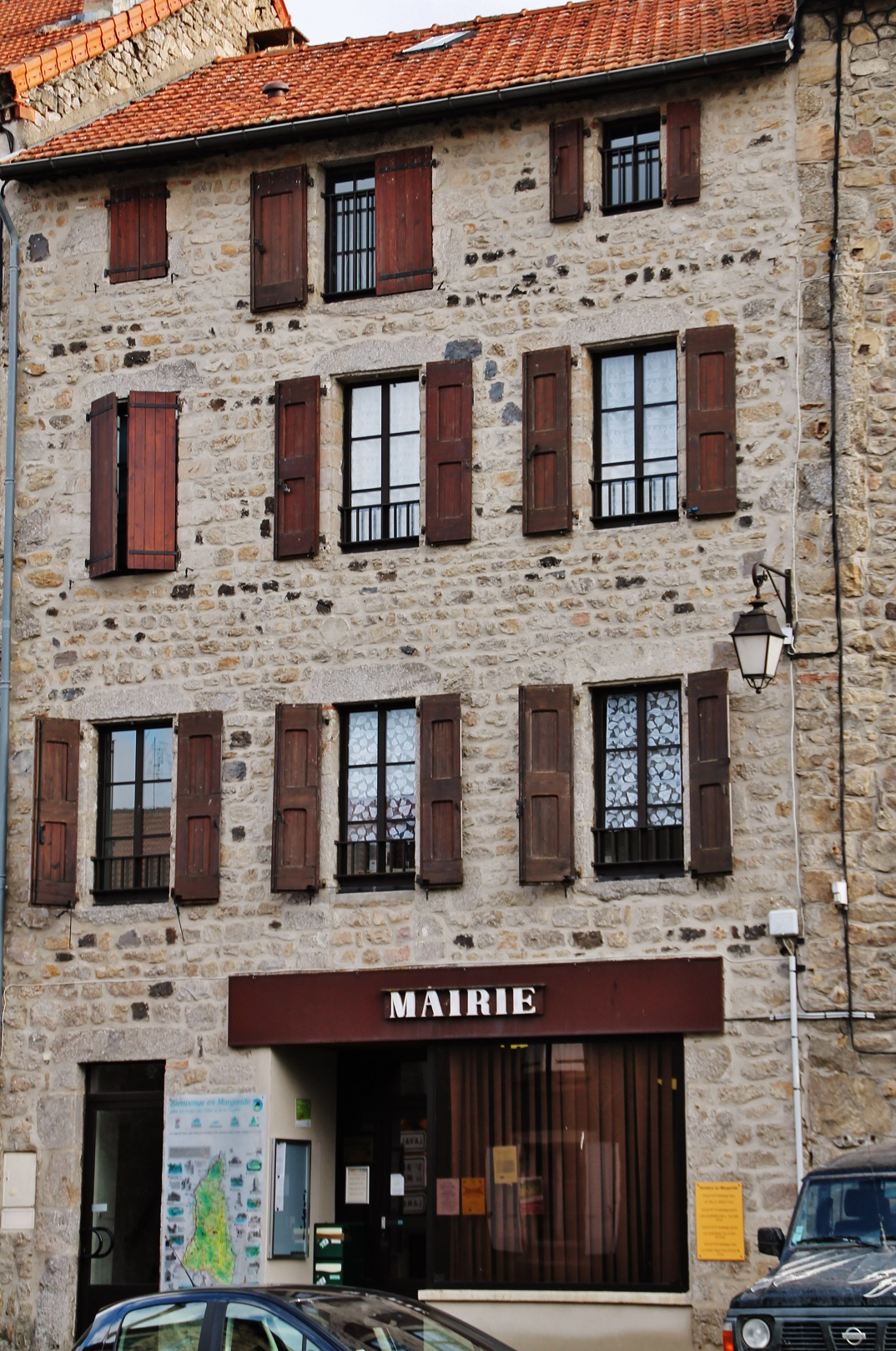
- The town hall in Chambon-le-Château

- Coat of arms
- Location of Bel-Air-Val-d'Ance
- Location within France Location within Occitanie
- Coordinates: 44°51′14″N 3°39′37″E
- Country: France
- Region: Occitania
- Department: Lozère
- Arrondissement: Mende
- Canton: Grandrieu
- Intercommunality: CC Haut Allier Margeride
- Area^{1}: 41.40 km^{2} (15.98 sq mi)
- Elevation: 1,000 m (3,300 ft)
- Highest elevation: 1,237 m (4,058 ft)
- Lowest elevation: 891 m (2,923 ft)
- Population (2023): 532
  - Density: 12.9/km^{2} (33.3/sq mi)
- Time zone: UTC+01:00 (CET)
  - Summer (DST): UTC+02:00 (CEST)
- INSEE/Postal code: 48038 /48600
- ^{1} French Land Register data, which excludes lakes, ponds, glaciers > 1 km^{2} (0.386 sq mi or 247 acres) and river estuaries.

Bel-Air-Val-d'Ance (French pronunciation: [bɛl ɛʁ val dɑ̃s]) is a commune in the Lozère department in southern France. It was established on 1 January 2019 by merger of the former communes of Chambon-le-Château (the seat) and Saint-Symphorien.

== See also ==
- Communes of the Lozère department
