= Saint-Bonnet-Laval =

- Commune
- Location of Saint-Bonnet-Laval
- Location within France Location within Occitanie
- Coordinates: 44°48′58″N 3°43′16″E
- Country: France
- Region: Occitania
- Department: Lozère
- Arrondissement: Mende
- Canton: Langogne
- Intercommunality: CC Haut Allier Margeride
- Area^{1}: 32.0 km^{2} (12.4 sq mi)
- Population (2023): 258
  - Density: 8.06/km^{2} (20.9/sq mi)
- Time zone: UTC+01:00 (CET)
  - Summer (DST): UTC+02:00 (CEST)
- INSEE/Postal code: 48139 /48600
- ^{1} French Land Register data, which excludes lakes, ponds, glaciers > 1 km^{2} (0.386 sq mi or 247 acres) and river estuaries.

Saint-Bonnet-Laval is a commune in the department of Lozère, southern France. The municipality was established on 1 January 2017 by merger of the former communes of Saint-Bonnet-de-Montauroux (the seat) and Laval-Atger.

== See also ==
- Communes of the Lozère department
