= Pierrefiche, Lozère =

Pierrefiche
- Commune
- Location of Pierrefiche
- Location within France Location within Occitanie
- Coordinates: 44°41′29″N 3°44′03″E
- Country: France
- Region: Occitania
- Department: Lozère
- Arrondissement: Mende
- Canton: Grandrieu
- Intercommunality: CC Randon - Margeride

Government
  - Mayor (2021–2026): Didier Mathieu
- Area^{1}: 16.82 km^{2} (6.49 sq mi)
- Elevation: 1,060 m (3,480 ft)
- Highest elevation: 1,285 m (4,216 ft)
- Lowest elevation: 1,074 m (3,524 ft)
- Population (2023): 158
  - Density: 9.39/km^{2} (24.3/sq mi)
- Time zone: UTC+01:00 (CET)
  - Summer (DST): UTC+02:00 (CEST)
- INSEE/Postal code: 48112 /48300
- ^{1} French Land Register data, which excludes lakes, ponds, glaciers > 1 km^{2} (0.386 sq mi or 247 acres) and river estuaries.

Pierrefiche (French pronunciation: [pjɛʁfiʃ]; Occitan: Pèiraficha) is a village and commune in the Lozère département in southern France.

== Geography ==
The Chapeauroux forms most of the commune's western border, then flows northeastward through the commune.

== See also ==
- Communes of the Lozère department
