= Laval-Atger =

- Part of Saint-Bonnet-Laval
- Coat of arms
- Location of Laval-Atger
- Location within France Location within Occitanie
- Coordinates: 44°48′31″N 3°41′46″E
- Country: France
- Region: Occitania
- Department: Lozère
- Arrondissement: Mende
- Canton: Langogne
- Commune: Saint-Bonnet-Laval
- Area^{1}: 10.67 km^{2} (4.12 sq mi)
- Elevation: 800 m (2,600 ft)
- Highest elevation: 1,175 m (3,855 ft)
- Lowest elevation: 828 m (2,717 ft)
- Population (2022): 149
  - Density: 14.0/km^{2} (36.2/sq mi)
- Time zone: UTC+01:00 (CET)
  - Summer (DST): UTC+02:00 (CEST)
- Postal code: 48600
- ^{1} French Land Register data, which excludes lakes, ponds, glaciers > 1 km^{2} (0.386 sq mi or 247 acres) and river estuaries.

Laval-Atger (Occitan: La Val Atgièr) is a former commune in the Lozère department in southern France. On 1 January 2017, it was merged into the new commune Saint-Bonnet-Laval. Its population was 149 in 2022.

== Geography ==
The Chapeauroux forms most of the commune's south-western border, flows northeastward through the commune, then forms part of its north-eastern border.

== See also ==
- Communes of the Lozère department
