= Grandrieu =

- Commune
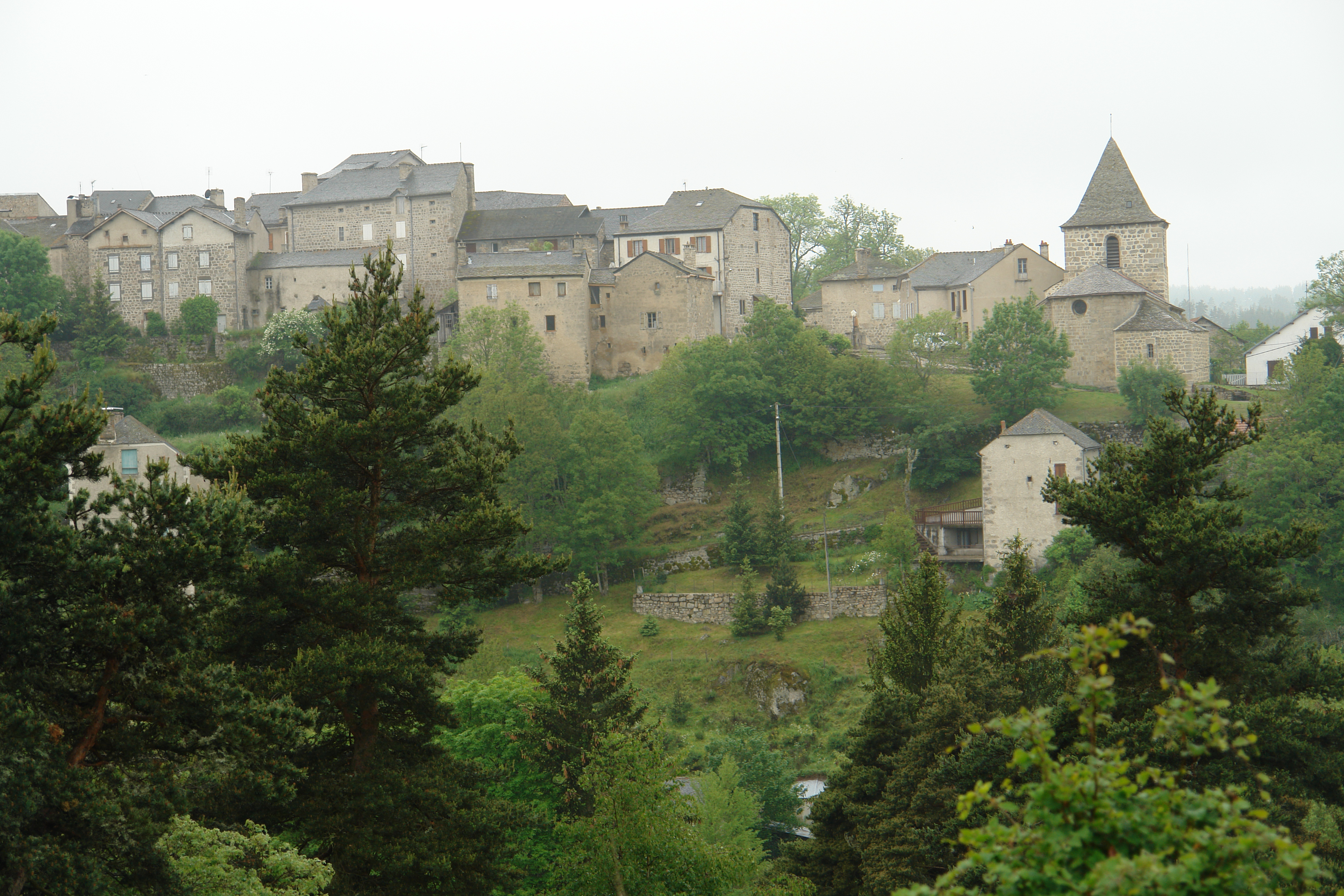
- Gandrieu from across the valley

- Coat of arms
- Location of Grandrieu
- Location within France Location within Occitanie
- Coordinates: 44°47′07″N 3°38′02″E
- Country: France
- Region: Occitania
- Department: Lozère
- Arrondissement: Mende
- Canton: Grandrieu
- Intercommunality: CC Randon - Margeride

Government
  - Mayor (2020–2026): Guy Galtier
- Area^{1}: 65.37 km^{2} (25.24 sq mi)
- Elevation: 1,160 m (3,810 ft)
- Highest elevation: 1,317 m (4,321 ft)
- Lowest elevation: 867 m (2,844 ft)
- Population (2023): 736
  - Density: 11.3/km^{2} (29.2/sq mi)
- Time zone: UTC+01:00 (CET)
  - Summer (DST): UTC+02:00 (CEST)
- INSEE/Postal code: 48070 /48600
- ^{1} French Land Register data, which excludes lakes, ponds, glaciers > 1 km^{2} (0.386 sq mi or 247 acres) and river estuaries.

Grandrieu (French pronunciation: [gʁɑ̃ʁjø]; Occitan: Grandriu) is a village and commune in the Lozère department in southern France. In February 1965, it absorbed the former commune Sainte-Colombe-de-Montauroux.

== Geography ==
The Chapeauroux forms parts of the commune's north-eastern border.

== See also ==
- Communes of the Lozère department
