= Frederick Randon Jr =

English cricketer

Personal information
- Full name: Frederick John Randon
- Born: 18 November 1873; Hathern, Leicestershire, England
- Died: 15 January 1949 (aged 75); Hathern, Leicestershire, England
- Batting: Left-handed
- Bowling: Left-arm medium
- Relatives: Frederick Randon senior (father)

Domestic team information
- Years: Team
- 1894: Leicestershire

Career statistics
Competition	First-class
Matches	3
Runs scored	5
Batting average	1.66
100s/50s	–/–
Top score	5
Balls bowled	278
Wickets	4
Bowling average	32.00
5 wickets in innings	–
10 wickets in match	–
Best bowling	3/20
Catches/stumpings	1/–
- Source: Cricinfo, 23 January 2013

Frederick John Randon (18 November 1873 – 15 January 1949) was an English cricketer. Randon was a left-handed batsman who bowled left-arm medium pace. He was born at Hathern, Leicestershire.

Randon made his debut for Leicestershire in their inaugural first-class match against Essex in 1894 at the County Ground, Essex. He made two further first-class appearances in 1894 against Surrey and Lancashire. In his three matches, he took 4 wickets at an average of 32.00, with best figures of 3/20. With the bat, he scored 5 runs at a batting average of 1.66.

He died at the village of his birth on 15 January 1949. His father Frederick Randon senior also played first-class cricket.
