= Frederick Randon senior =

English cricketer (1845–1883)

Personal information
- Full name: Frederick Randon
- Born: 24 June 1845; Stapleford, Nottinghamshire, England
- Died: 17 February 1883 (aged 37); Hathern, Leicestershire, England
- Batting: Right-handed
- Bowling: Right-arm roundarm fast
- Relatives: Frederick Randon, Jr. (son)

Domestic team information
- Years: Team
- 1874–1876: Marylebone Cricket Club

Career statistics
Competition	First-class
Matches	15
Runs scored	104
Batting average	6.50
100s/50s	–/–
Top score	23*
Balls bowled	1,386
Wickets	37
Bowling average	17.70
5 wickets in innings	2
10 wickets in match	–
Best bowling	6/54
Catches/stumpings	6/–
- Source: Cricinfo, 24 June 2019

Frederick Randon (24 June 1845 – 17 February 1883) was an English first-class cricketer.

Randon was born at Stapleford in June 1845. He made his debut in first-class cricket for the Marylebone Cricket Club against the North at Lord's in 1874. He played first-class cricket until 1876, making fifteen appearances, including playing for the Players of the North in 1874 and the North in 1875. In fifteen first-class appearances, he scored 104 runs with a high score of 23 not out. With his right-arm roundarm fast bowling, he took 37 wickets at an average of 17.70, with best figures of 6 for 54. One of two five-wicket hauls he took, these figures came for the Marylebone Cricket Club against Nottinghamshire in 1874. Besides playing, Randon worked as coach at some of the top public schools, including Eton College and Wellington College. He stood as an umpire in first-class matches on six occasions between 1875–80. While playing at Lord's in 1881, he was seriously injured when struck on the head by a ball. He never fully recovered and died in February 1883. His son, Frederick junior, was also a first-class cricketer.

== See also ==
- List of unusual deaths in the 19th century
- Ray Chapman, an American baseball player killed after being struck by a ball during a game; he was the only player in Major League Baseball history to die of an in-game injury
- List of fatalities while playing cricket
