= Monts-de-Randon =

- Commune
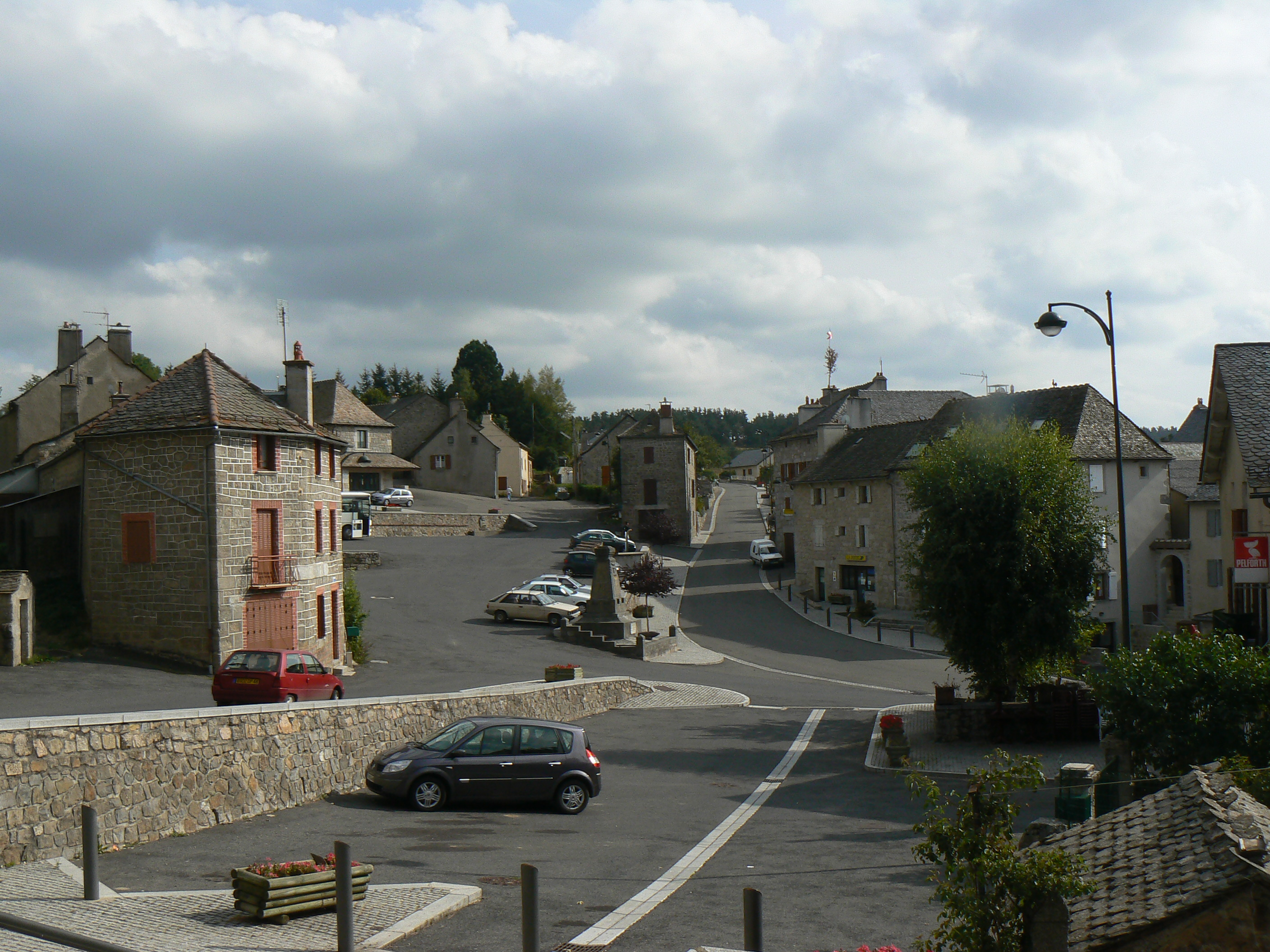
- The church square, in Rieutort-de-Randon
- Location of Monts-de-Randon
- Location within France Location within Occitanie
- Coordinates: 44°38′07″N 3°28′45″E
- Country: France
- Region: Occitania
- Department: Lozère
- Arrondissement: Mende
- Canton: Saint-Alban-sur-Limagnole
- Intercommunality: Randon-Margeride

Government
  - Mayor (2020–2026): Francis Saint-Léger
- Area^{1}: 147.38 km^{2} (56.90 sq mi)
- Highest elevation: 1,550 m (5,090 ft)
- Lowest elevation: 840 m (2,760 ft)
- Population (2023): 1,209
  - Density: 8.203/km^{2} (21.25/sq mi)
- Time zone: UTC+01:00 (CET)
  - Summer (DST): UTC+02:00 (CEST)
- INSEE/Postal code: 48127 /48700
- ^{1} French Land Register data, which excludes lakes, ponds, glaciers > 1 km^{2} (0.386 sq mi or 247 acres) and river estuaries.

Monts-de-Randon (French pronunciation: [mɔ̃ də ʁɑ̃dɔ̃]) is a commune in the Lozère department in southern France. It was established on 1 January 2019 by merger of the former communes of Rieutort-de-Randon (the seat), Estables, Saint-Amans, Servières and La Villedieu.

== See also ==
- Communes of the Lozère department
