= La Villedieu, Lozère =

La Villedieu
- Part of Monts-de-Randon
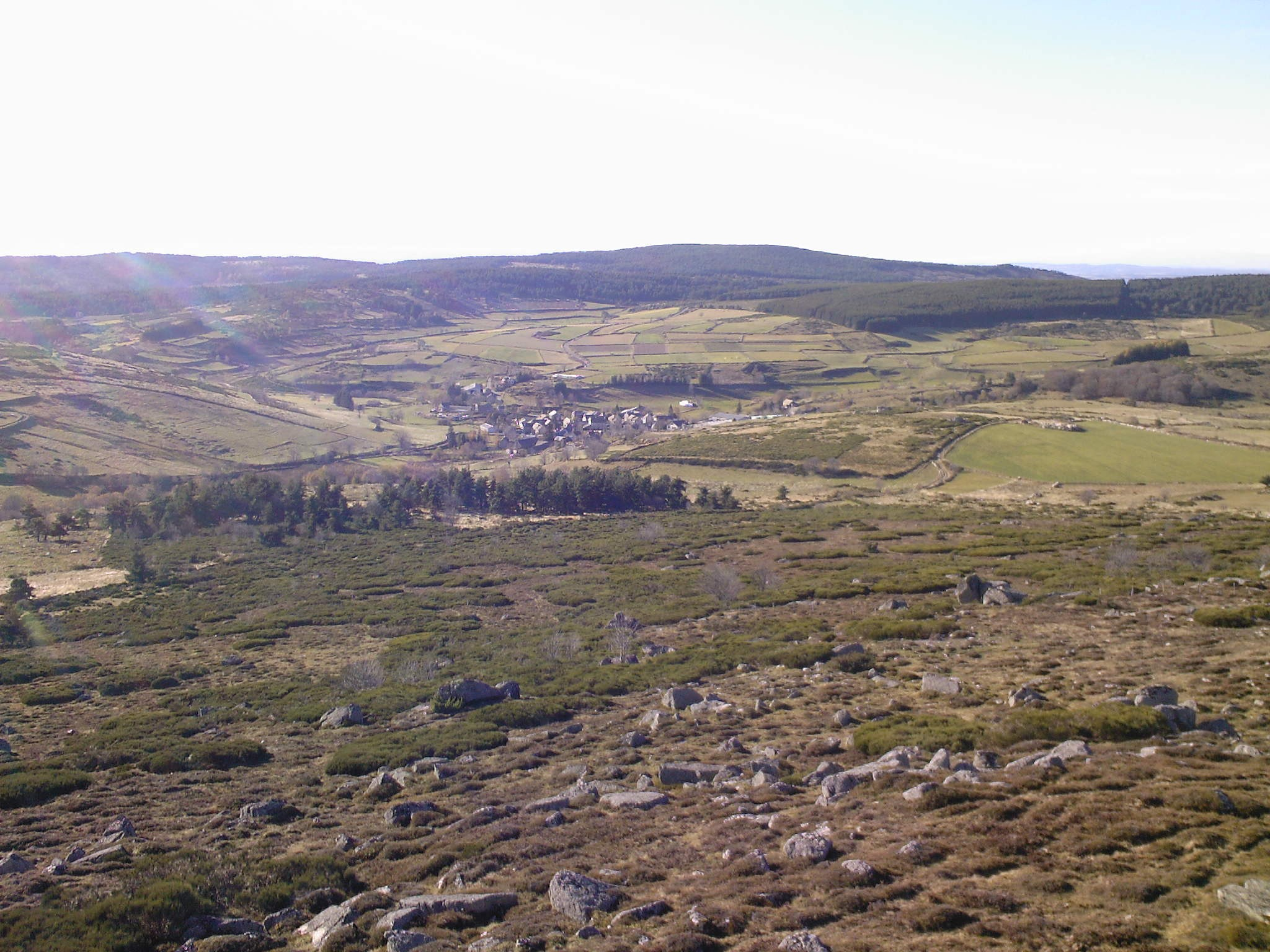
- A distant view of the village
- Location of La Villedieu
- Location within France Location within Occitanie
- Coordinates: 44°42′55″N 3°31′18″E
- Country: France
- Region: Occitania
- Department: Lozère
- Arrondissement: Mende
- Canton: Saint-Alban-sur-Limagnole
- Commune: Monts-de-Randon
- Area^{1}: 22.79 km^{2} (8.80 sq mi)
- Elevation: 1,220 m (4,000 ft)
- Highest elevation: 1,506 m (4,941 ft)
- Lowest elevation: 1,217 m (3,993 ft)
- Population (2022): 34
  - Density: 1.5/km^{2} (3.9/sq mi)
- Time zone: UTC+01:00 (CET)
  - Summer (DST): UTC+02:00 (CEST)
- Postal code: 48700
- ^{1} French Land Register data, which excludes lakes, ponds, glaciers > 1 km^{2} (0.386 sq mi or 247 acres) and river estuaries.

La Villedieu (French pronunciation: [la vildjø]; Occitan: La Vialadiu) is a former commune in the Lozère department in southern France. On 1 January 2019, it was merged into the new commune Monts-de-Randon.

== See also ==
- Communes of the Lozère department
