= Saint-Jean-la-Fouillouse =

- Commune
- Location of Saint-Jean-la-Fouillouse
- Location within France Location within Occitanie
- Coordinates: 44°42′06″N 3°41′32″E
- Country: France
- Region: Occitania
- Department: Lozère
- Arrondissement: Mende
- Canton: Grandrieu
- Intercommunality: CC Randon - Margeride

Government
  - Mayor (2020–2026): Louis Gibert
- Area^{1}: 29.27 km^{2} (11.30 sq mi)
- Elevation: 1,223 m (4,012 ft)
- Highest elevation: 1,348 m (4,423 ft)
- Lowest elevation: 1,086 m (3,563 ft)
- Population (2023): 125
  - Density: 4.27/km^{2} (11.1/sq mi)
- Time zone: UTC+01:00 (CET)
  - Summer (DST): UTC+02:00 (CEST)
- INSEE/Postal code: 48160 /48170
- ^{1} French Land Register data, which excludes lakes, ponds, glaciers > 1 km^{2} (0.386 sq mi or 247 acres) and river estuaries.

Saint-Jean-la-Fouillouse (French pronunciation: [sɛ̃ ʒɑ̃ la fujuz]; Occitan: Sent Joan de la Folhosa) is a village and commune in the Lozère department in southern France.

== Geography ==
The river Chapeauroux forms most part of the commune's south-eastern border.

== See also ==
- Communes of the Lozère department
