= Saint-Sauveur-de-Ginestoux =

- Commune
- Location of Saint-Sauveur-de-Ginestoux
- Location within France Location within Occitanie
- Coordinates: 44°42′19″N 3°36′24″E
- Country: France
- Region: Occitania
- Department: Lozère
- Arrondissement: Mende
- Canton: Grandrieu
- Intercommunality: CC Randon - Margeride

Government
  - Mayor (2020–2026): Franck Bachelard
- Area^{1}: 22.14 km^{2} (8.55 sq mi)
- Elevation: 1,300 m (4,300 ft)
- Population (2023): 60
  - Density: 2.7/km^{2} (7.0/sq mi)
- Time zone: UTC+01:00 (CET)
  - Summer (DST): UTC+02:00 (CEST)
- INSEE/Postal code: 48182 /48170
- ^{1} French Land Register data, which excludes lakes, ponds, glaciers > 1 km^{2} (0.386 sq mi or 247 acres) and river estuaries.

Saint-Sauveur-de-Ginestoux (French pronunciation: [sɛ̃ sovœʁ də ʒinɛstu]; Occitan: Sent Sauvador de Ginestós) is a commune in the Lozère department in southern France.

== Population ==
Historical population

Year	Pop.	±% p.a.
1793	205	—
1821	207	+0.03%
1846	296	+1.44%
1872	314	+0.23%
1901	307	−0.08%
1926	253	−0.77%
1946	188	−1.47%
1962	167	−0.74%
1968	136	−3.36%

Year	Pop.	±% p.a.
1975	115	−2.37%
1982	93	−2.99%
1990	81	−1.71%
1999	68	−1.93%
2007	65	−0.56%
2012	56	−2.94%
2017	57	+0.35%
2023	60	+0.86%

Source: EHESS and INSEE (1968-2023)

== See also ==
- Communes of the Lozère department
