= Rieutort-de-Randon =

- Part of Monts-de-Randon
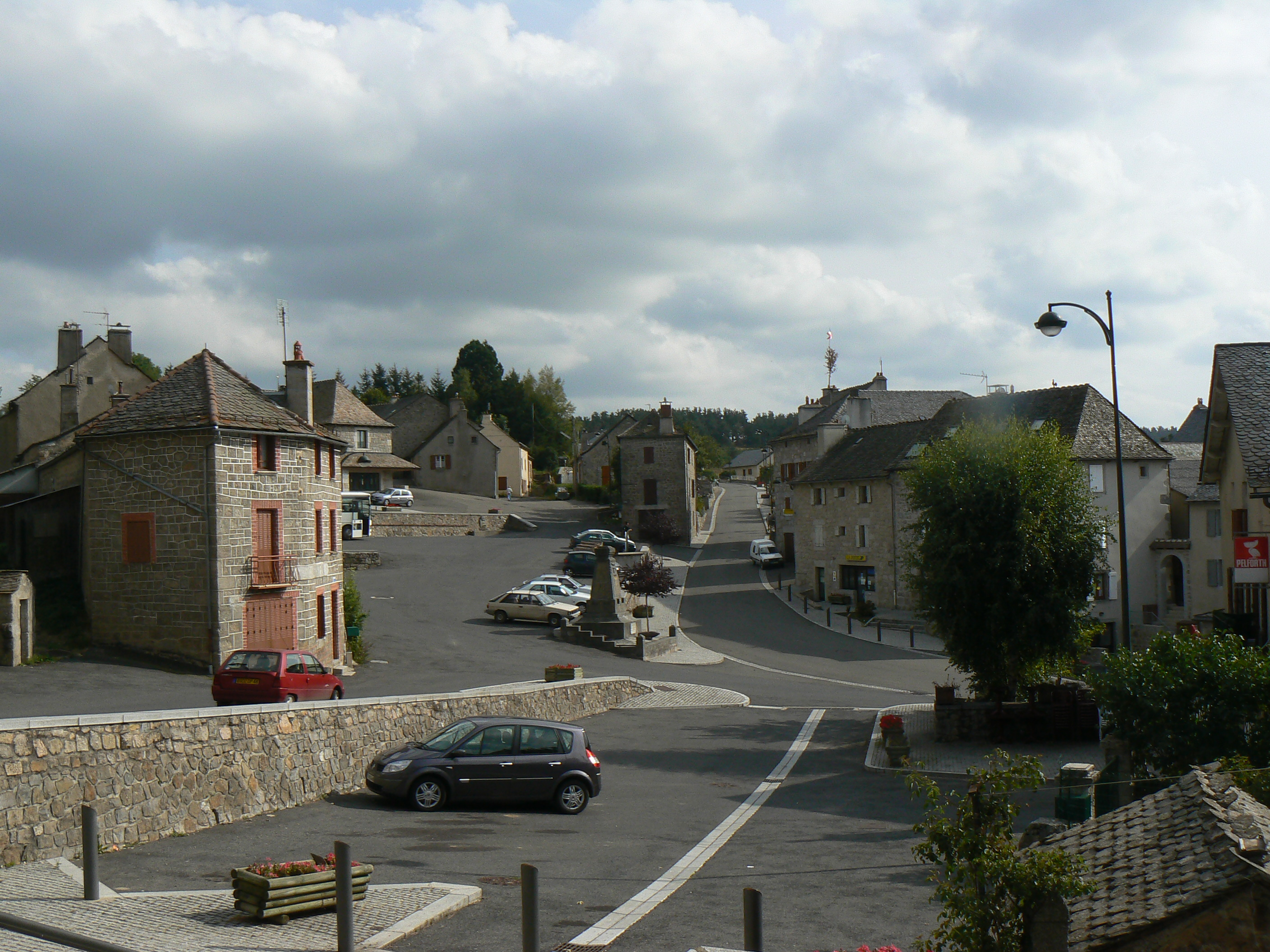
- The church square, in Rieutort-de-Randon
- Location of Rieutort-de-Randon
- Location within France Location within Occitanie
- Coordinates: 44°38′07″N 3°28′45″E
- Country: France
- Region: Occitania
- Department: Lozère
- Arrondissement: Mende
- Canton: Saint-Alban-sur-Limagnole
- Commune: Monts-de-Randon
- Area^{1}: 63.24 km^{2} (24.42 sq mi)
- Elevation: 1,140 m (3,740 ft)
- Highest elevation: 1,550 m (5,090 ft)
- Lowest elevation: 1,034 m (3,392 ft)
- Population (2022): 723
  - Density: 11.4/km^{2} (29.6/sq mi)
- Time zone: UTC+01:00 (CET)
  - Summer (DST): UTC+02:00 (CEST)
- Postal code: 48700
- ^{1} French Land Register data, which excludes lakes, ponds, glaciers > 1 km^{2} (0.386 sq mi or 247 acres) and river estuaries.

Rieutort-de-Randon (French pronunciation: [ʁjøtɔʁ də ʁɑ̃dɔ̃]; Occitan: Riutòrt de Randon) is a former commune in the Lozère department in southern France. On 1 January 2019, it was merged into the new commune Monts-de-Randon.

== Geography ==
The lac de Charpal forms part of the commune's eastern border; from the lake, the Colagne flows northwestward through the northern part of the commune.

== See also ==
- Communes of the Lozère department
