= Laubert =

- Commune
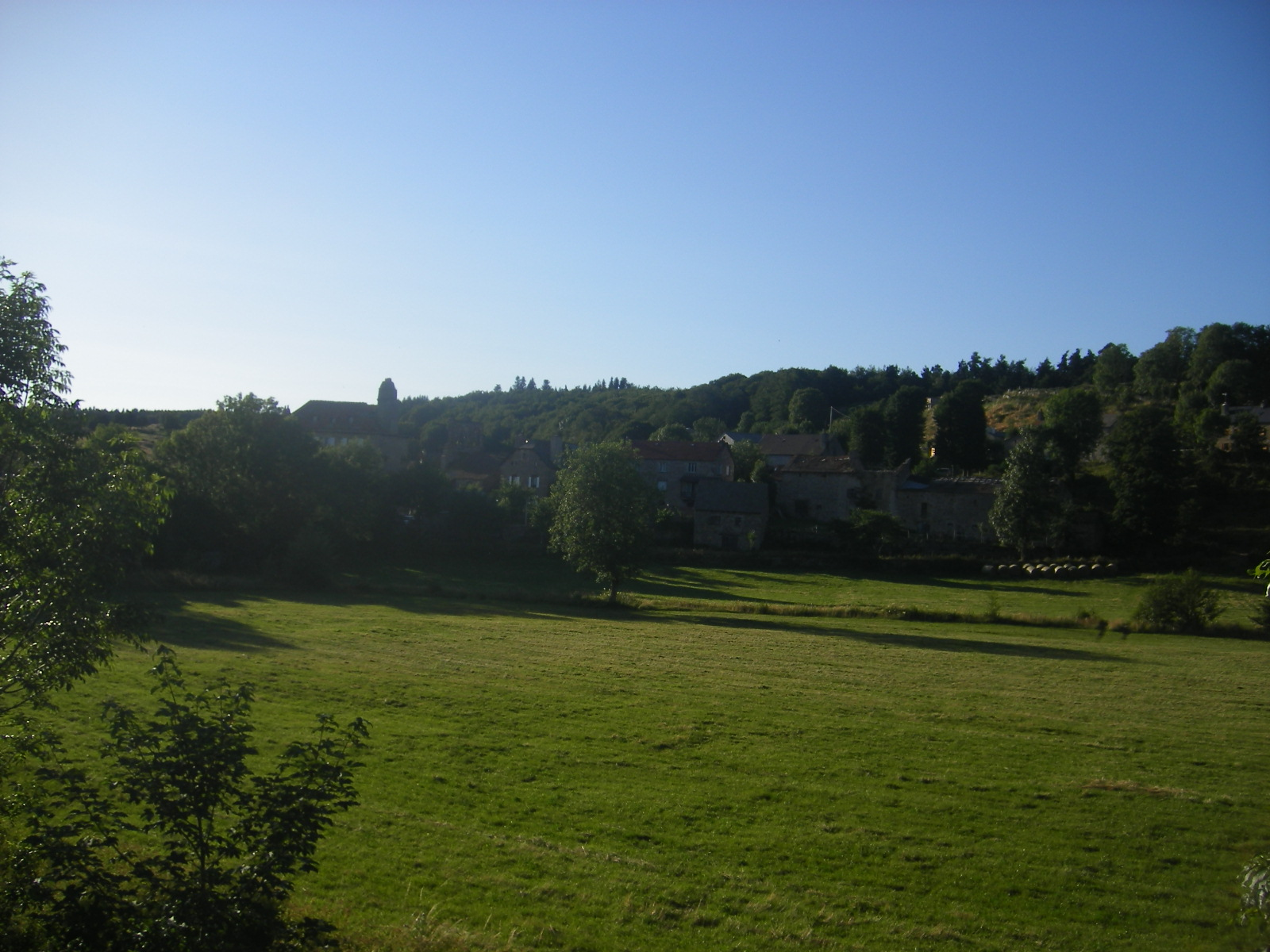
- A general view of Laubert
- Location of Laubert
- Location within France Location within Occitanie
- Coordinates: 44°35′11″N 3°38′28″E
- Country: France
- Region: Occitania
- Department: Lozère
- Arrondissement: Mende
- Canton: Grandrieu

Government
  - Mayor (2020–2026): Gilbert Debien
- Area^{1}: 14.28 km^{2} (5.51 sq mi)
- Elevation: 1,200 m (3,900 ft)
- Highest elevation: 1,428 m (4,685 ft)
- Lowest elevation: 1,186 m (3,891 ft)
- Population (2023): 102
  - Density: 7.14/km^{2} (18.5/sq mi)
- Time zone: UTC+01:00 (CET)
  - Summer (DST): UTC+02:00 (CEST)
- INSEE/Postal code: 48082 /48170
- ^{1} French Land Register data, which excludes lakes, ponds, glaciers > 1 km^{2} (0.386 sq mi or 247 acres) and river estuaries.

Laubert (French pronunciation: [lobɛʁ]; Occitan: Laubèrt) is a commune in the Lozère department in southern France.

Inhabitants of Laubert are called Laubertois in French.

== Geography ==
Laubert is on the RN88, 20 km (12 mi) north of Mende and 69 km (43 mi) south of Le Puy-en-Velay.

== History ==
=== The church ===
A chapel was founded in 1278, which was destroyed 1636, and rebuilt in 1773. The chapel was replaced by the present church in 1825.

The church tower is "en peigne". The commune's council refounded the main bell in 1963, because it was cracked.

A little fountain at the base of the church adds to the village's charm.

In it are:

- a 15th-century Christ in multicoloured wood,
- a virgin and child from the seventeenth century in gilded wood,
- an Atlas supporting the pulpit (there are three other Atlases of this type in Lozère),
- a gilded and painted retable, with turned columns, which came from the Capuchin church at Mende, topped with two urns.

=== The castle ===
The old castle cannot be visited. Only the outside and the ramparts are visible.

== See also ==
- Communes of the Lozère department
