= Montbel, Lozère =

Montbel
- Commune
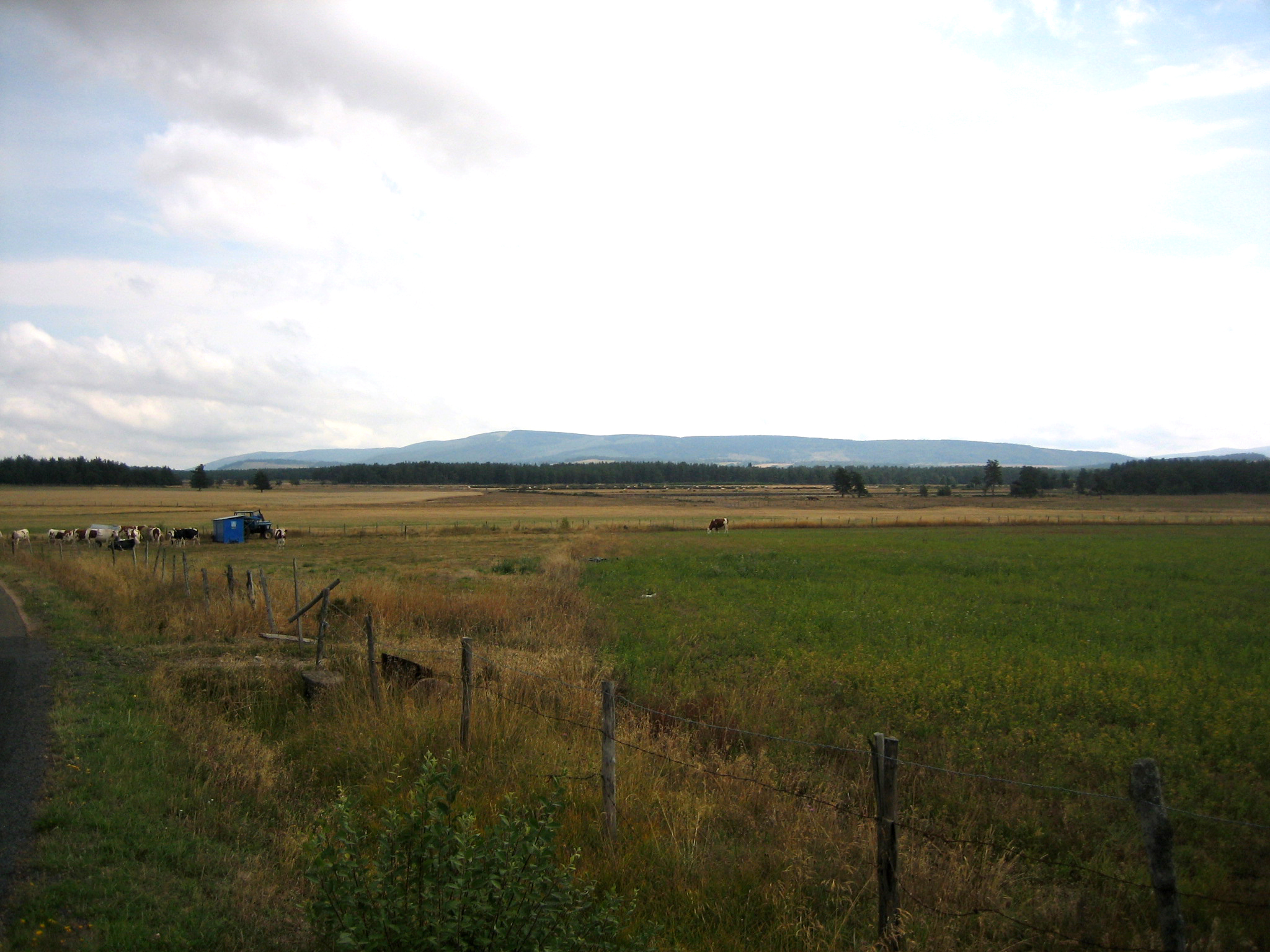
- The plain of Montbel
- Location of Montbel
- Location within France Location within Occitanie
- Coordinates: 44°35′34″N 3°42′59″E
- Country: France
- Region: Occitania
- Department: Lozère
- Arrondissement: Mende
- Canton: Grandrieu
- Intercommunality: Mont Lozère

Government
  - Mayor (2020–2026): Sylvain Meyniel
- Area^{1}: 22.87 km^{2} (8.83 sq mi)
- Elevation: 1,220 m (4,000 ft)
- Highest elevation: 1,436 m (4,711 ft)
- Lowest elevation: 1,186 m (3,891 ft)
- Population (2023): 146
  - Density: 6.38/km^{2} (16.5/sq mi)
- Time zone: UTC+01:00 (CET)
  - Summer (DST): UTC+02:00 (CEST)
- INSEE/Postal code: 48100 /48170
- ^{1} French Land Register data, which excludes lakes, ponds, glaciers > 1 km^{2} (0.386 sq mi or 247 acres) and river estuaries.

Montbel (French pronunciation: [mɔ̃bɛl]; Occitan: Montbèl) is a commune in the Lozère département in southern France.

== See also ==
- Communes of the Lozère department
