= Arzenc-de-Randon =

- Commune
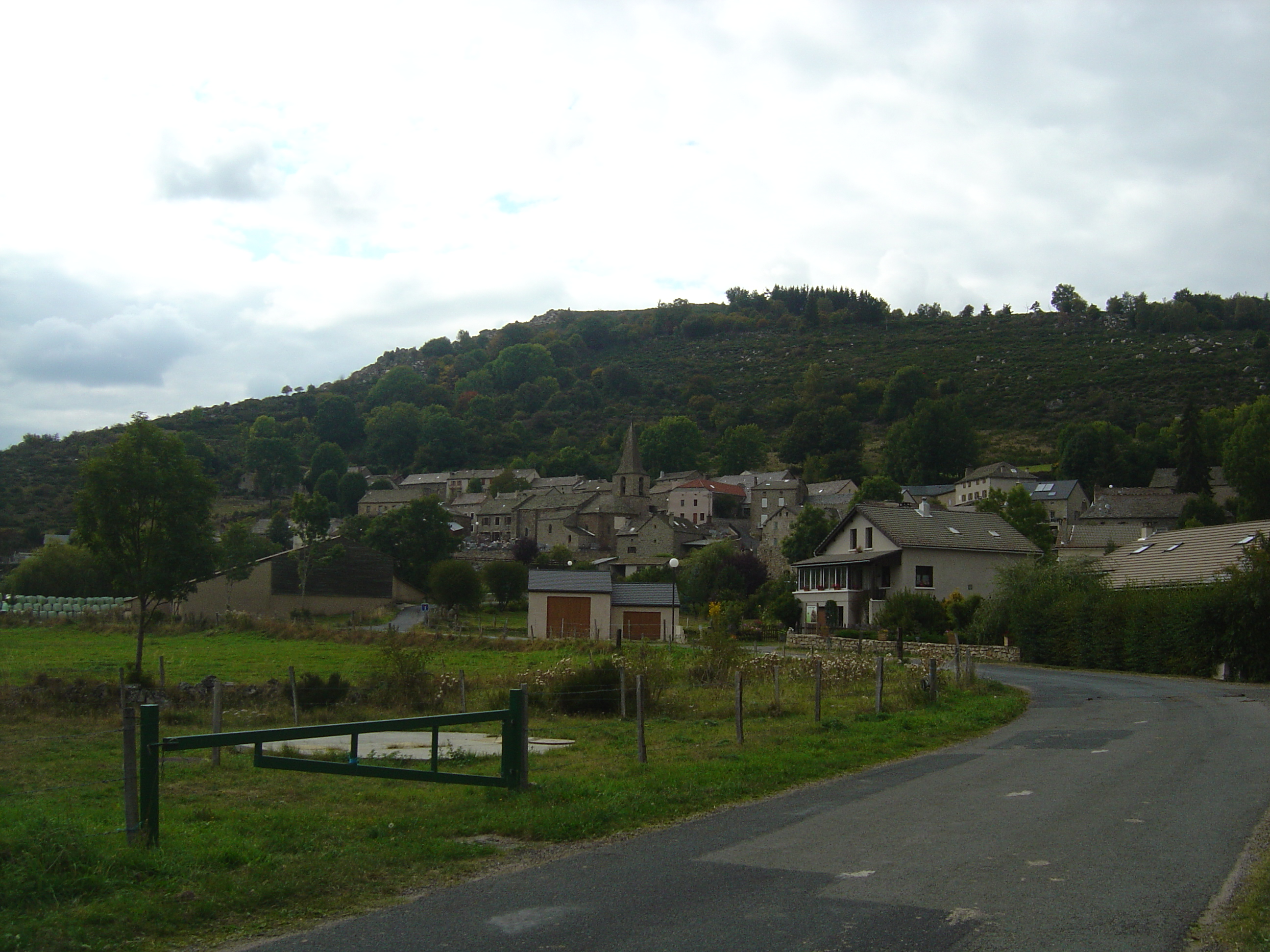
- A general view of the village of Arzenc-de-Randon

- Coat of arms
- Location of Arzenc-de-Randon
- Location within France Location within Occitanie
- Coordinates: 44°39′45″N 3°37′58″E
- Country: France
- Region: Occitania
- Department: Lozère
- Arrondissement: Mende
- Canton: Grandrieu
- Intercommunality: CC Randon-Margeride

Government
  - Mayor (2020–2026): Francis Gibert
- Area^{1}: 69.20 km^{2} (26.72 sq mi)
- Elevation: 1,189 m (3,901 ft)
- Highest elevation: 1,542 m (5,059 ft)
- Lowest elevation: 1,146 m (3,760 ft)
- Population (2023): 191
  - Density: 2.76/km^{2} (7.15/sq mi)
- Time zone: UTC+01:00 (CET)
  - Summer (DST): UTC+02:00 (CEST)
- INSEE/Postal code: 48008 /48170
- ^{1} French Land Register data, which excludes lakes, ponds, glaciers > 1 km^{2} (0.386 sq mi or 247 acres) and river estuaries.

Arzenc-de-Randon is a commune in the Lozère department in southern France.

== Geography ==
The Chapeauroux flows east through the middle of the commune.

The Colagne has its source in the commune; with the Lac de Charpal they form most of the commune's southwestern border.

== Population ==
Historical population
Year	Pop.	±% p.a.
1968	374	—
1975	300	−3.10%
1982	240	−3.14%
1990	180	−3.53%
1999	195	+0.89%
2007	206	+0.69%
2012	206	+0.00%
2017	200	−0.59%
2023	191	−0.76%
Source: INSEE

== See also ==
- Communes of the Lozère department
