= Châteauneuf-de-Randon =

Châteauneuf-de-Randon Chastèlnòu de Randon (Occitan)
- Commune
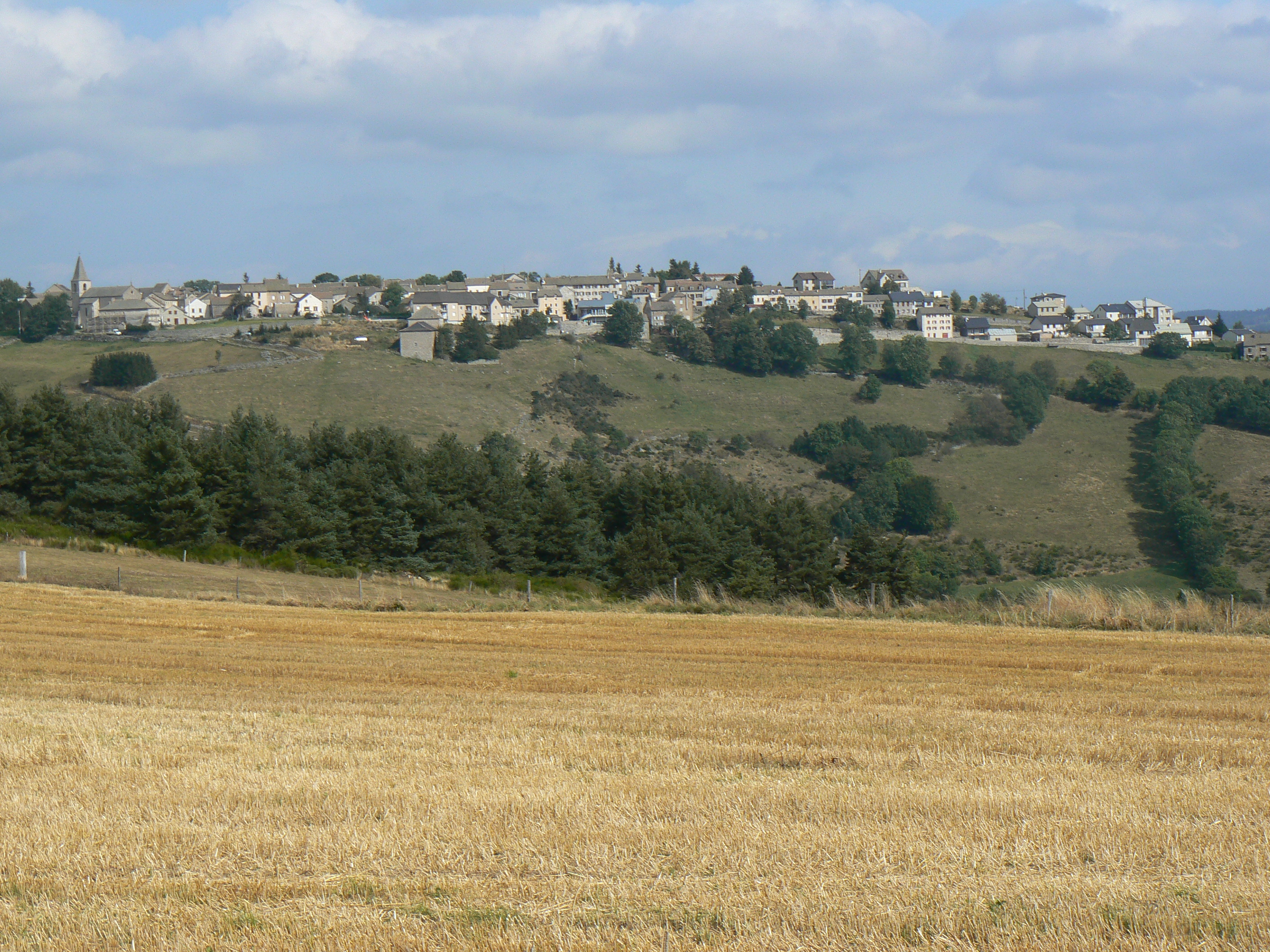
- A general view of Châteauneuf-de-Randon

- Coat of arms
- Location of Châteauneuf-de-Randon
- Location within France Location within Occitanie
- Coordinates: 44°38′29″N 3°40′34″E
- Country: France
- Region: Occitania
- Department: Lozère
- Arrondissement: Mende
- Canton: Grandrieu

Government
  - Mayor (2020–2026): Bruno Durand
- Area^{1}: 24.49 km^{2} (9.46 sq mi)
- Elevation: 1,286 m (4,219 ft)
- Highest elevation: 1,339 m (4,393 ft)
- Lowest elevation: 1,116 m (3,661 ft)
- Population (2023): 516
  - Density: 21.1/km^{2} (54.6/sq mi)
- Time zone: UTC+01:00 (CET)
  - Summer (DST): UTC+02:00 (CEST)
- INSEE/Postal code: 48043 /48170
- ^{1} French Land Register data, which excludes lakes, ponds, glaciers > 1 km^{2} (0.386 sq mi or 247 acres) and river estuaries.

Châteauneuf-de-Randon (French: [ʃɑtonœf də ʁɑ̃dɔ̃]; Occitan: Chastèlnòu de Randon) is a village and commune in the Lozère department in southern France.

== History ==
The battle of Châteauneuf-de-Randon was fought in 1380 between the English and the French. In 1380 the fortress of Châteauneuf-de-Randon was besieged by the French, under the command of Bertrand du Guesclin, and the fortress was defended by an English garrison under De Ros. The town surrendered on the 4th of July. The siege, however, was fatal to the French commander.

== Geography ==
The Chapeauroux forms part of the commune's western border, flows eastward through the middle of the commune, then forms part of its eastern border.

=== Climate ===
Climate data for Chateauneuf-de-Randon, 1247m (1991−2020 normals, extremes 1951−present)
Month	Jan	Feb	Mar	Apr	May	Jun	Jul	Aug	Sep	Oct	Nov	Dec	Year
Record high °C (°F)	20.0 (68.0)	19.5 (67.1)	21.5 (70.7)	28.0 (82.4)	28.0 (82.4)	35.0 (95.0)	38.0 (100.4)	38.0 (100.4)	38.0 (100.4)	30.0 (86.0)	22.0 (71.6)	17.3 (63.1)	38.0 (100.4)
Mean daily maximum °C (°F)	3.8 (38.8)	4.7 (40.5)	8.4 (47.1)	10.8 (51.4)	15.5 (59.9)	20.0 (68.0)	23.2 (73.8)	23.0 (73.4)	17.6 (63.7)	12.7 (54.9)	7.0 (44.6)	4.0 (39.2)	12.6 (54.6)
Daily mean °C (°F)	0.0 (32.0)	0.5 (32.9)	3.4 (38.1)	5.7 (42.3)	10.0 (50.0)	13.9 (57.0)	16.4 (61.5)	16.4 (61.5)	12.1 (53.8)	8.3 (46.9)	3.3 (37.9)	0.5 (32.9)	7.5 (45.6)
Mean daily minimum °C (°F)	−3.8 (25.2)	−3.8 (25.2)	−1.6 (29.1)	0.5 (32.9)	4.5 (40.1)	7.8 (46.0)	9.7 (49.5)	9.9 (49.8)	6.5 (43.7)	3.9 (39.0)	−0.4 (31.3)	−3.1 (26.4)	2.5 (36.5)
Record low °C (°F)	−24.0 (−11.2)	−32.0 (−25.6)	−22.0 (−7.6)	−12.0 (10.4)	−6.0 (21.2)	−3.0 (26.6)	−1.0 (30.2)	−1.0 (30.2)	−4.0 (24.8)	−8.5 (16.7)	−15.0 (5.0)	−21.0 (−5.8)	−32.0 (−25.6)
Average precipitation mm (inches)	70.5 (2.78)	49.8 (1.96)	52.8 (2.08)	81.0 (3.19)	92.8 (3.65)	69.1 (2.72)	60.2 (2.37)	66.9 (2.63)	94.8 (3.73)	97.9 (3.85)	110.0 (4.33)	73.6 (2.90)	919.4 (36.19)
Average precipitation days (≥ 1.0 mm)	10.7	9.6	8.9	10.8	10.6	7.8	6.8	7.7	8.8	10.3	12.2	11.9	116.1
Source: Meteociel

== See also ==
- Communes of the Lozère department
