= Canton of Grandrieu =

Coordinates: 44.78°N 3.63°E

The canton of Grandrieu is an administrative division of the Lozère department, southern France. Its borders were modified at the French canton reorganisation which came into effect in March 2015. Its seat is in Grandrieu.

It consists of the following communes:

1. Allenc
2. Arzenc-de-Randon
3. Badaroux
4. Bel-Air-Val-d'Ance
5. Le Born
6. Chadenet
7. Châteauneuf-de-Randon
8. Chaudeyrac
9. Grandrieu
10. Laubert
11. Montbel
12. La Panouse
13. Pelouse
14. Pierrefiche
15. Sainte-Hélène
16. Saint-Frézal-d'Albuges
17. Saint-Jean-la-Fouillouse
18. Saint-Paul-le-Froid
19. Saint-Sauveur-de-Ginestoux
