= Parennes =

- Commune
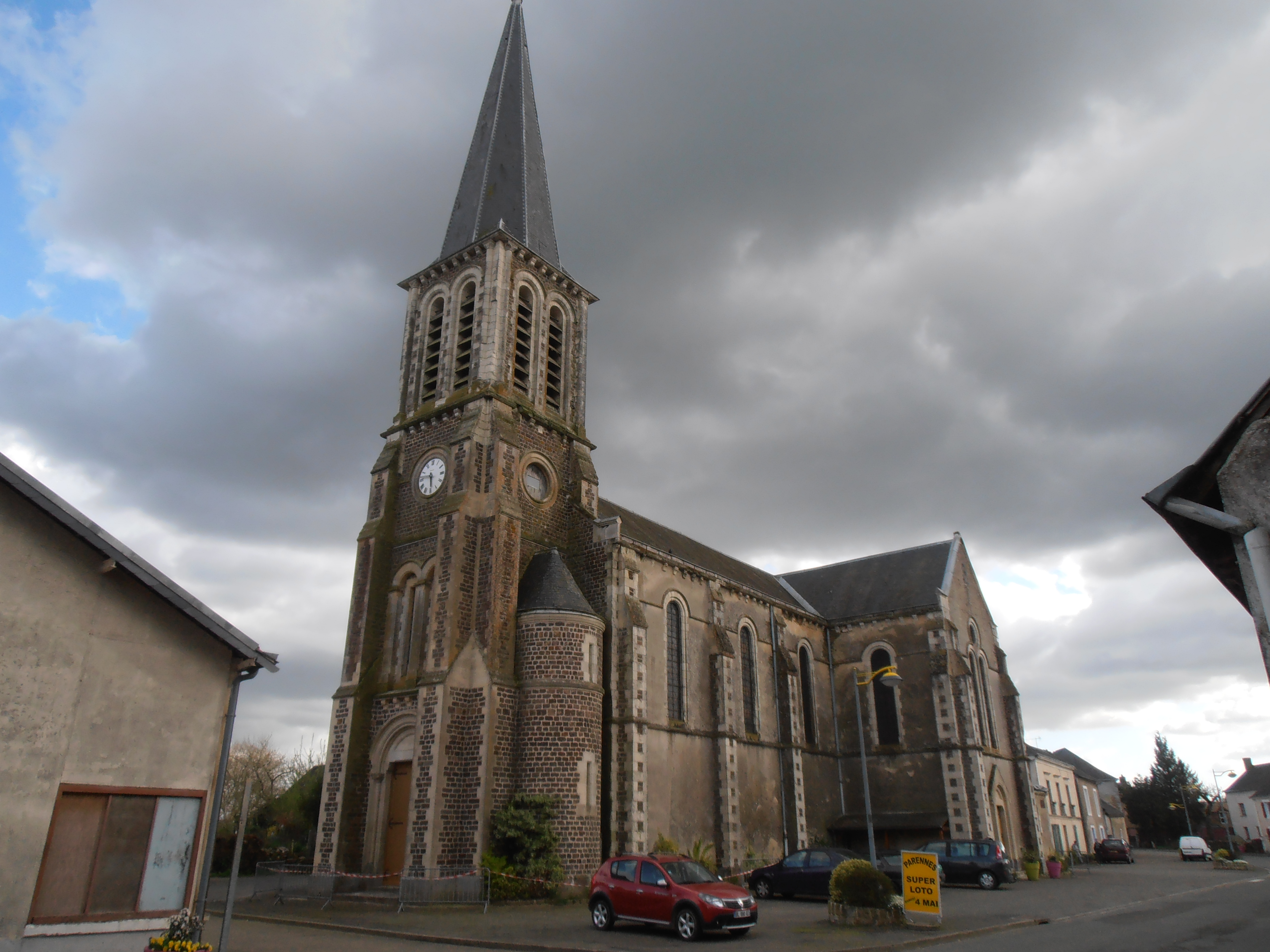
- The church of Saint-Martin, in Parennes
- Location of Parennes
- Location within France Location within Pays de la Loire
- Coordinates: 48°07′06″N 0°11′05″W
- Country: France
- Region: Pays de la Loire
- Department: Sarthe
- Arrondissement: Mamers
- Canton: Sillé-le-Guillaume
- Intercommunality: Champagne Conlinoise et Pays de Sillé

Government
  - Mayor (2020–2026): Nathalie Pasquier-Jenny
- Area^{1}: 14.50 km^{2} (5.60 sq mi)
- Highest elevation: 188 m (617 ft)
- Lowest elevation: 103 m (338 ft)
- Population (2023): 444
  - Density: 30.6/km^{2} (79.3/sq mi)
- Time zone: UTC+01:00 (CET)
  - Summer (DST): UTC+02:00 (CEST)
- INSEE/Postal code: 72229 /72140
- ^{1} French Land Register data, which excludes lakes, ponds, glaciers > 1 km^{2} (0.386 sq mi or 247 acres) and river estuaries.

Parennes (French pronunciation: [paʁɛn]) is a commune in the Sarthe department in the region of Pays de la Loire in north-western France.

== Notable people ==
- Doctor Auguste Chaillou (1866 in Parennes - 1915), collaborator of Louis Pasteur and Émile Roux in the discovery of the anti-diphtheria serum. Died at the Battle of Vauquois.
- Christian Vélot (1964 in Parennes), biologist, GMO activist and politician.

== See also ==
- Communes of the Sarthe department
