= Pierre-Victor Galtier =

French veterinarian and professor

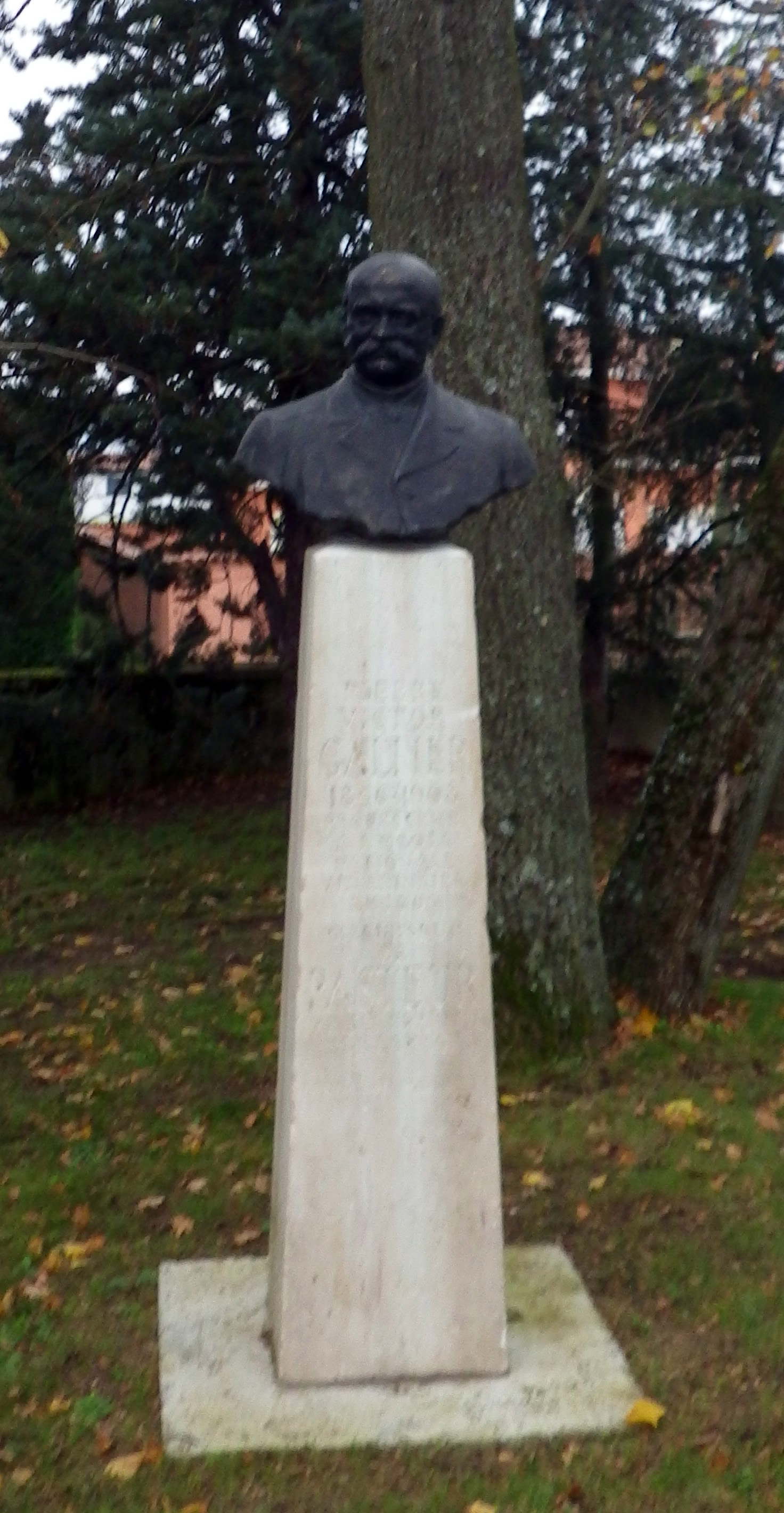
- Bust of Pierre-Victor Galtier
- Born: 15 October 1846; Langogne, Lozère
- Died: 24 April 1908 (aged 61); La Mulatière
- Occupation: Veterinarian
- Known for: Research into the rabies virus

Pierre-Victor or Pierre Victor Galtier (15 October 1846 – 24 April 1908) was a veterinarian and professor at the National Veterinary School of Lyon, specialising in pathology of infectious diseases, health surveillance and commercial and medical legislation. He developed a rabies vaccine which had some experimental success in laboratory animals.

== Early life and studies ==
Galtier was born on 15 October 1846 in Langogne, Lozère to a farmer's family. In 1853, he was entrusted to the nuns who ran the local school. He escaped from this school twice, only to be placed with his grandmother who lived in Langogne. There, he attended secondary school, leaving after the tenth grade.

He read Greco-Roman studies at La Chapelle-Saint-Mesmin in the "Petit Séminaire", the famous ecclesiastical secondary school of Bishop Felix Dupanloup, an outpost of the Seminar d'Orléans. He received his bachelor's degree with honours.

He studied for his master's degree and his veterinary license at Marvejols college. Around this time Lozère created a scholarship to help poor students to study to become veterinarians, which Galtier received and used to study at the National Veterinary School of Lyon. He came top of the class for four consecutive years, and graduated in 1873 as a valedictorian, receiving the "Grand prix Bourgelat".

== Career ==
Galtier began his professional career as an associate of Monsieur Delorme, a veterinarian in Arles, whose daughter he married. He began teaching veterinary pathology and eventually became the Chair of Infectious Diseases. Aged 33, he began his work on rabies.

In 1876, he was appointed the Chair of Pathology and Internal Medicine in the veterinary science department at Lyon. In 1877, his department began to carry out studies on microbial pathology and microbiology. This led to the school supporting the idea of contagious diseases such as tuberculosis, the common cold, and rabies, as opposed to the National Veterinary School of Alfort which supported the idea of spontaneous generation.

In 1878 he was appointed professor of pathology of infectious diseases, animal health, trade and medical law. In the same year, Mr. Bouley, Inspector General of veterinary schools, created a new department that would separate the teaching of general pathology from that of communicable diseases. Pierre Victor Galtier was appointed to the department chair and held the position for 30 years.

In 1879, he made important discoveries about two deadly diseases: common cold and rabies. In 1883, he obtained a law degree.

For his work on rabies, Galtier was considered for the 1908 Nobel Prize in Physiology or Medicine. However, he died in La Mulatière on 24 April 1908, thereby preventing his nomination.

== Honors ==
- 1881: Member of the Anthropological Society of Lyon
- 1887: Member of the National Agricultural Society, natural history and useful Arts de Lyon
- 1888: Officer Academy
- 1891: Knight Legion of Honor
- 1895: Officer of the Order of Agricultural Merit
- Correspondent of the Academy of Medicine
- 1898: Correspondent of the National Society of Agriculture
- 1898: Associate of the National Central Society of Veterinary Medicine Associate
- 1901: Elected Associate of the Académie nationale de médecine, by 56 votes out of 59
- 1903: Appointed Commander of Agricultural Merit
- 1903–08: Member of the Veterinary Academy of France
- 1903: Member of the Rhône Hygiene County Council
- 1906: Appointed Officer of Education
  - Member of the Rhone vaccines commission
  - Four gold medals with the effigy of Olivier de Serres (works on rabies, pneumo-enteritis in sheep and horse and tuberculosis) Agricultural Society of France
- 1887: Bréant Prize (for his work on rabies)
- 1887: Barbier Prize French: Prix Barbier (for his work on rabies). Academy of Medicine, contests
- 1890: Behague Prize of the National Society of Agriculture of France for his work on the pneumo-enteritis in sheep (25 June)
- 1891: Barbier Prize (for his work on pneumo-enteritis from cheeses)
- 1892: Stanski Prize (for the second edition of contagious diseases)

== Work on rabies ==
Pierre Galtier was notable for his work on rabies; he was the first to develop a vaccine for rabies. He also made important advances in the study of the common cold and on the infectiousness of viruses.

Galtier assumed that, because of the incubation period of rabies, the development of a vaccine could be used as curative for a disease like this.

=== 1879 ===
His first publication on rabies was a thesis entitled "Studies on rabies" published in two veterinary journals and whose findings are published in the Proceedings of the Academy of Sciences.

On 25 April 1879, the Academy of Sciences published his notes on rabies.

The article made clear his conclusions about rabies:

1. The dog rabies is transmitted to the rabbit, which thus becomes a convenient and safe reagent to determine the status of non-virulence or virulence of various liquids from rabid animals (…)
2. Rabies is transmitted to animals (rabbits) of his kind (…)
3. Symptoms that predominate in the rabid rabbits are paralysis and convulsions.
4. The rabbit can live from several hours to one, two and even four days after the disease has clearly declared.
5. (…) the incubation period (Note: That is to say, the incubation period for rabies.) is shorter in him than in other species. (Based on an experience table published in the note, Galtier accurately and correctly calculates an average incubation time for the rabbit 18 days).
6. Salicylic acid, administered by hypodermic injection, the daily dose of 0.0068 gr for fourteen consecutive days from the fiftieth hour after inoculation, did not prevent the development of rabies the rabbit.
7. The saliva of rabid dog, collected on the living animal and stored in the water is still virulent five, fourteen twenty-four hours.

Galtier also had a brilliant idea: he began experiments to find an agent capable of neutralizing rabies virus. He thought that the discovery of an effective preventive was almost equivalent to the discovery of a cure, especially if it was effective when administered within a day or two of an infected bite. It is this 'genius idea which is the basis of preventive treatment for rabies by vaccination'.

=== 1880 ===
In 1880, Galtier published a "Treaty of contagious diseases" which contains a chapter on rabies. (Note: This book had three editions: in 1880, 1891, 1897.)

In this book, he wrote this sentence summarizing his first observations on immunity to rabies: "Rabies virus injected directly into the blood stream is ineffective, at least this is what I found in several experiences where I had injected into the jugular vein of the sheep a large amount of rabid drool". His experiments were published in several articles the following year.

Also in 1880, Louis Pasteur became interested in rabies and took note of Galtier's work, regarding him with a certain disdain, stating that these experiments "do not make it possible to reconicle, let alone identify the disease […] as rabies". Pasteur often denigrated his predecessors before taking over their work, and the credit for it; he also did this with Henri Toussaint and Antoine Béchamp.

=== 1881 ===
In August 1881, Galtier sent a note to the Academy of Sciences. He noted his experiences of the intravenous inoculation of the rabies virus in the bloodstream.

He wrote:

The findings that emerge from these facts are the following:

1. Injections of rabies virus into the veins of the sheep do not cause rabies and seem to confer immunity.
2. Rabies can be transmitted by injection of the rabies material.

This method provided immunity against rabies in sheep. In the Bulletin of the Academy of Medicine, he wrote: "I injected the rabies saliva into the jugular vein of sheep seven times, and never saw rabies, one of my test subjects was successively inoculated with saliva from a rabid dog, four months after this inoculation, the animal is alive and well; he seems to have acquired immunity. I inoculated him for another fortnight by putting eight cubic centimeters of rabid saliva in the peritoneum; it always went very well; then I would administer him another inoculation."

According to the science historian Jean Théodoridès, this is the first time in the history of medicine that the idea of immunization against rabies was supported by convincing experimental results.

=== 1882 ===
Galtier remarked "intravenous inoculation is ineffective. [But] immunity follows this inoculation in sheep", and he noted the absence of virus in the nerve centers.

This last point drew the attention of Louis Pasteur who saw a lack of sensitivity due to the subcutaneous inoculation technique. With his student Émile Roux, Pasteur developed an intracranial inoculation, by trepanning the skull of a dog. This isolated the virus in the nerve centers, and supported the idea that rabies is neurotropic, meaning that the virus preferentially develops in nerve cells, and spreads through nerve pathways from the peripheral inoculation point to the brain.

=== 1883 ===
In 1883, Émile Roux published his medical doctorate thesis on "New acquisitions on rabies." According to Jean Théodoridès, the most striking thing about Roux's thesis is the frequent mention of the work of Galtier, whereas Pasteur referred to Galtier only incidentally.

=== 1886 ===
In 1886, Galtier published an important book on rabies, Rabies considered in animals and humans from the point of view of its character and its prophylaxis (French: La rage envisagée chez les animaux et chez l'homme au point de vue de ses caractères et de sa prophylaxie). It discussed:

- Symptoms
- Curability
- Cause, proving the lack of "spontaneous" rabies, and concluding that "contagion is the only cause that can cause rabies in animals of any kind."
- Transmission of rabies between different animals
- Experimental methods of transmission of rabies by bites

It reviewed Galtier's research of 1879–1881, and reported that research was continuing as of 1886 (the date of publication of the book).

The book also dealt with health measures and forensics, dog control measures (wearing the collar, a muzzle, leash).

=== 1887 ===
In 1887, Galtier received the Barbier Prize (French: Prix Barbier) from the Académie nationale de médecine for his work on rabies.

In its report on awarding the Barbier Prize to Galtier, Edmond Nocard wrote: "The discovery of Mr. Galtier, therefore, has a high importance not only from the scientific point of view but also in practical point of view; it is hoped that it will soon lead to the establishment of a simple, practical and effective treatment, saving the largest number of bitten animals."

The same year, he received the Bréant Price of the Academy of Sciences (December 1887) for his book on rabies. Bouchard, on behalf of the Commission consisting of Marey, Charcot, Brown- Séquard and Verneuil emphasized the importance of the work of several years preceding those of Louis Pasteur.

=== 1888 ===
On 30 January 1888, Galtier published an article in the Proceedings of the Academy of Sciences. He insisted that "the rabies virus retains its activity in buried corpses, so that when doubts arise afterwards about the nature of the disease that caused the death, exhumation, and inoculation of the bulb are naturally indicated".

For Galtier (a veterinary professor, qualified in medical law and contagious diseases), the consequence of the persistence of the rabies virus meant that, in cases of question of the liability of animal owners, corpses could be exhumed to confirm a diagnosis of rabies.

On 16 April 1888, he again sent a note. He recalled his experiences in 1880–1881 showing that injection of the rabies virus in the veins of sheep and goats did not cause rabies, but instead conferred immunity. He noted that research in 1884 by Edmond Nocard and Emile Roux confirmed the validity of these deductions. These authors noted that intravenous injection can prevent rabies after inoculation into the eye, and after the bite of a rabid animal.

In his article, Galtier also related his experiments on sheep.

=== 1891 ===
The second edition of Galtier's On Contagious Diseases was published in 1891. Galtier was disappointed, to the point of physical pain, by the negative remarks from Louis Pasteur about his research. Pateur stated that dogs did not acquire immunity, as Galtier found in sheep and goats, following intravenous injection of rabies. However, Edmond Nocard and Emile Roux had already confirmed in 1888 that their experiments of 1884 had confirmed Galtier's experiments of 1881.

=== 1904 ===
In 1904, Galtier lost four of his eight children and his wife, and was strongly discouraged.

He published an article entitled "Pages of history" in which he wrote: "… I had studied first, from 1879-80-81, the effects of intravenous injection of the rabies virus. I was the first to demonstrate, in the most peremptory manner, its safety in herbivorous animals, and immunizing action. I established this first, before there was any thought of vaccination Pasteur or any others, that immunity against deadly rabies could be granted to certain animals by a particular method of inoculation … From 1881 onward, I had shown that virus injected into the veins of sheep and goats does not cause rabies, but confers immunity".

In this article, he promoted is pioneering rabies immunizations, stressing that the results achieved in small ruminants (sheep and goats) were confirmed by Edmond Nocard and Emile Roux in 1888.

=== 1907 ===
In 1907, Galtier received a significant token of esteem from the Karolinska Institute of Stockholm, who asked him to send all his work on rabies to offer his candidacy Nobel Prize of physiology and medicine for the year 1908. However, Galtier was never nominated for a Nobel Prize; as his death most likely interrupted the nomination process.

=== Other work ===
Galtier also wrote several works on the intimate nature of the tissues on the infectiousness of the virus.

He wrote two books on Health regulation and legislation of its relationship with the pet trade and on The Treaty of contagious diseases and animal health.

Galtier focused mainly on infectious diseases of domestic animals: rabies, the common cold, tuberculosis, anthrax, and pneumococcal enteritis.

== Publications ==
=== Publications about rabies ===
- Galtier, Pierre (1879). "Études sur la rage" [Studies on rabies]. Rec. Méd. Vét (in French). 6, 2nd series (17): 857–867.
- Galtier, P. (1879). "Études sur la rage" [Studies on rabies]. Ann. Med. Vet. (in French). 28: 627–39.
- Pierre Galtier, studies on rabies – Rage of the rabbit. Galtier memory presented to the Academy of Sciences by M. Bouley, Proceedings of the Academy of Sciences in 1879, volume 89, pages 444–446, 25 August 1879.
- Pierre Galtier, First demonstration of rabies immunity and toxicity of nervous matter. Mr. Galtier submission to the Academy of Medicine by Mr. Bouley, Bulletin of the Academy of Medicine 1881, Volume 10, p 90–94, 25 January 1881
- Pierre Galtier, Transmission of rabies virus, Bull Acad. Med., 1881 {2} {e} series, Volume 10, p. 90–94
- Galtier, Pierre V. (1 August 1881). "Les injections de virus rabique dans le torrent circulatoire ne provoquent pas l'éclosion de la rage et semblent conférer l'immunité. La rage peut être transmise par l'ingestion de la matiere rabique" [Rabies injections into the circulation do not cause the outbreak of rabies and appear to confer immunity. Rabies can be transmitted by ingestion of the rabies matter]. Proceedings of the Academy of Sciences (in French). 93. Paris: 284–285.
- Galtier, V (1886). La rage envisagée chez les animaux et chez l'homme au point de vue de ses caractères et de sa prophylaxie (in French). Lyon, France: L.Bourgeon. (Barbier Prize Academy of Medicine. Session of 13 December 1887). (Bréant Prize of the Academy of Sciences on Professor Bouchard's proposal claiming for the teacher Galtier, the first demonstration of rabies immunity. Session of 26 December 1887)
- Pierre Galtier, Persistence of rabid virulence in buried corpses. Note Mr. Galtier presented to the Academy of Sciences by Mr. Chauveau. Proceedings of the Academy of Sciences 1888, vol 106, p. 364–366, 30 January 1888
- Pierre Galtier, New experiences on anti-rabies inoculation to preserve herbivorous animals from rabies after mad dogs bite. A shelf life of the rabies virus. Note Mr. Galtier, presented at the Academy of Sciences by M. Chauveau. Proceedings of the Academy of Sciences in 1888, volume 106, pages 1189–1191, 16 April 1888.
- Pierre Galtier, New experiments designed to demonstrate the efficacy of intravenous injections of rabies virus to preserve rabies animals bitten by rabid dogs. Note Mr. Galtier presented to the Academy of Sciences by Mr. Chauveau, Proceedings of the Academy of Sciences in 1888, volume 107, pages 798–799, 12 November 1888
- Pierre Galtier, Treaty of infectious diseases, 1891, vol. 2, 141. (a chapter is dedicated to rabies).
- Pierre Galtier, A History page. Discovery of rabies immunity. Rabies vaccination by intravenous injection. Note communicated to the Barcelona Pasteur Review (-Spain Veterinary Journal in May 1908). Journal of Veterinary Medicine and Zoology, May 1904, 55, p. 274–277

=== Others ===
- — (1880). Traité des maladies contagieuses et de la police sanitaire des animaux domestiques (in French). Lyon: Beau.
- — (9 May 1887). "Dangers de l'utilisation des produits tels que le petit lait et le fromage, obtenus avec le lait de vaches tuberculeuses". Comptes rendus de l'Académie des sciences (in French). 104: 1333–1335.
- — (27 June 1887). "De l'emploi des sangs frais dans la clarification des vins, au point de vue de la transmission possible de la tuberculose à l'homme". Comptes rendus de l'Académie des sciences (in French). 104: 1879–1881.
- — (25 July 1887). "Dangers des matières tuberculeuses qui ont subi le chauffage, la dessiccation, le contact de l'eau, la salaison, la congélation, la putréfaction". Comptes rendus de l'Académie des sciences (in French). 105: 231–234.
- —; Violet (1890). Les pneumo-entérites infectieuses des fourrages ou variétés des affections typhoïdes des animaux solipèdes (in French). Lyon. Mémoire awarded with the Olivier de Serres Prize by the National Society of Agriculture of France and with the Barbier Prize by the Academy of Medicine on 15 December 1891.
- — (1891–1892). Traité des maladies contagieuses (in French) (2nd revised ed.). Hasselin et Houzeau. Volume I: 935 pages, volume II: 975 pages. Awarded with the Stanski Prize by the Academy of Medicine on 13 December 1892.
- — (1897). Traité des maladies contagieuses (in French). Paris: Asselin-Houzeau.
- — (August 1903). "Action de l'iode sur le virus du charbon bactéridien et sur le virus du charbon symptomatique". Journal de médecine vétérinaire et de zootechnie (in French): 462–467.
