= Langogne =

- Commune
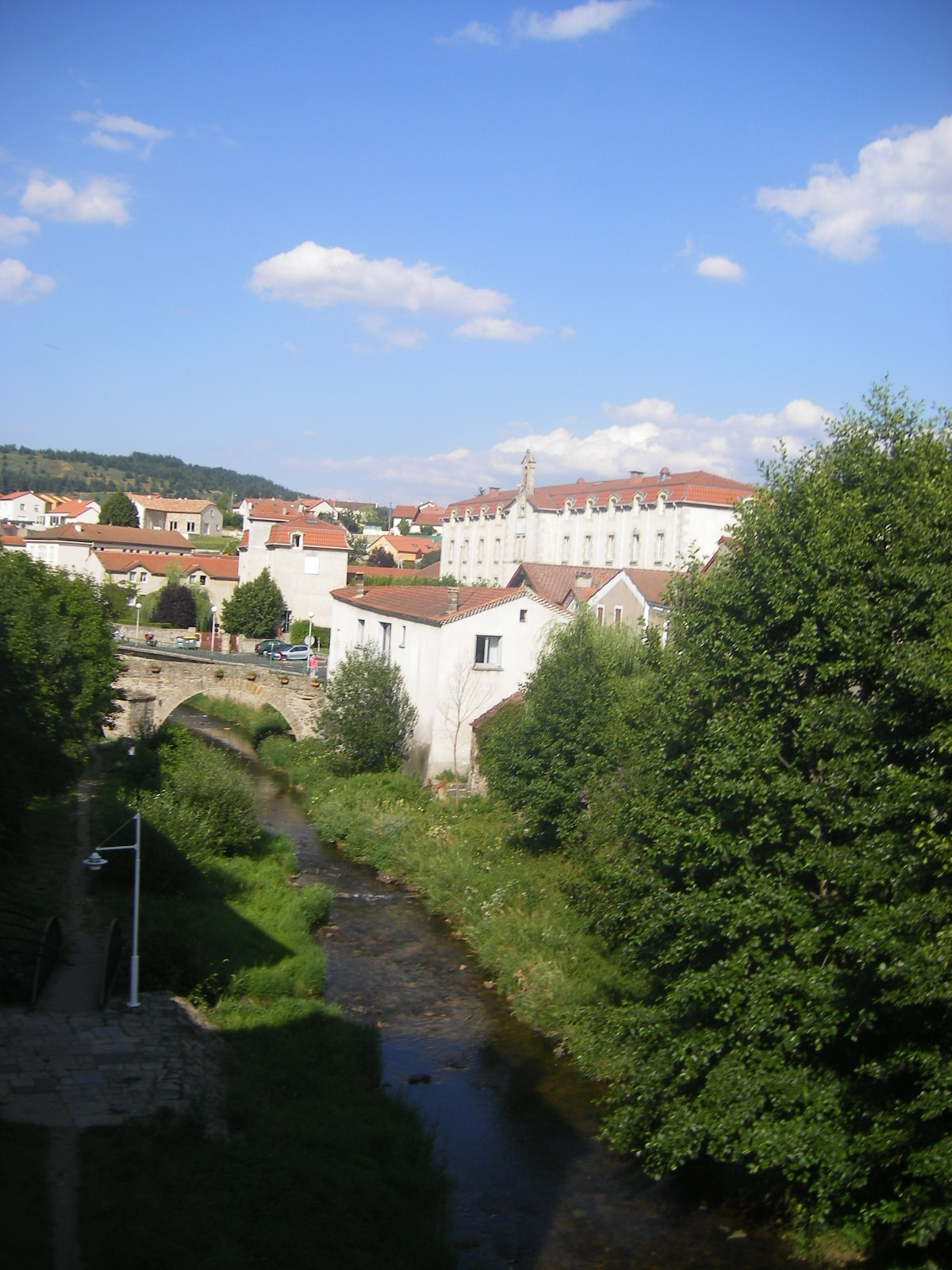
- A view of the river (Langouyrou) flowing through Langogne

- Coat of arms
- Location of Langogne
- Location within France Location within Occitanie
- Coordinates: 44°43′40″N 3°51′21″E
- Country: France
- Region: Occitania
- Department: Lozère
- Arrondissement: Mende
- Canton: Langogne

Government
  - Mayor (2020–2026): Marc Oziol
- Area^{1}: 31.37 km^{2} (12.11 sq mi)
- Elevation: 913 m (2,995 ft)
- Highest elevation: 1,097 m (3,599 ft)
- Lowest elevation: 886 m (2,907 ft)
- Population (2023): 2,836
  - Density: 90.40/km^{2} (234.1/sq mi)
- Time zone: UTC+01:00 (CET)
  - Summer (DST): UTC+02:00 (CEST)
- INSEE/Postal code: 48080 /48300
- ^{1} French Land Register data, which excludes lakes, ponds, glaciers > 1 km^{2} (0.386 sq mi or 247 acres) and river estuaries.

Langogne (French pronunciation: [lɑ̃ɡɔɲ]; Occitan: Lengònha) is a commune in the Lozère department in southern France.

Located on the antique Regordane way, the Paris–Nimes railway line and the road RN 88 (Lyon–Toulouse), the city has long been a commercial crossroad between the Auvergne, the Cévennes and the Languedoc. It is one of the gateways of the historic county of Gévaudan and of the Occitanie region.

Langogne is situated in the valley of the Allier, in a mountainous area. It is crossed by the Langouyrou stream that joins the Allier in the north of the commune. The city is overlooked by hills: Margeride, Mount Milan (Beauregard), Bonjour Volcano.

== History ==
The name appears in the corpus of Gaulish toponymy.

Mount Milan may have been an oppidum (as suggested by the findings of Roman medals, coins and weapons). It might have been the meeting area of the Gabali tributes that joined Vercingetorix’s army in their struggle against Caesar.

In the Early Middle Ages, the territory belonged to the Viguerie of Miliac, one of the eight composing the Gevaudan. The city itself was founded in 998 by the monks of le Monastier. The medieval town, built around the monastery, took benefit of the Regordane to become an important centre of trade. The stream allows the development of the wool and the textile industry.

During the Wars of Religions, the town was plundered in 1568 by the Huguenot troop of captain Merle.

The hunting of the Beast of Gévaudan started in Langogne in 1764. During the French Revolution, many religious items were destroyed by fire in the centre of the town in 1793.

The railway station opened in 1860. Langogne is in direct link to Paris and Nimes. That led to the growth of industry (mainly meat industry) and tourism.

The city was liberated in August 1944 by the 1st DB.

A march against the Naussac dam was organized in August 1976, with the attendance of well-known activists of this time. In 2002, Langogne charcutiers made the “longest sausage” in the world (23 km).

The town owns several medieval pieces of architecture (houses, ramparts, etc.) as well as a noted corned market built in 1743.

Robert Louis Stevenson passed through Langogne on his Travels with a Donkey in the Cévennes on 23 September 1878. He left descriptions of the countryside but nothing on the town itself, though it was the largest on his trip, and the largest on the GR 70, a long-distance footpath that follows Stevenson's route.

Just at the bridge of Langogne, as the long-promised rain was beginning to fall, a lassie of some seven or eight addressed me in the sacramental phrase, ‘D’où’st-ce-que vous venez?’ She did it with so high an air that she set me laughing; and this cut her to the quick. She was evidently one who reckoned on respect, and stood looking after me in silent dudgeon, as I crossed the bridge and entered the county of Gévaudan.

Langogne is the birthplace of Pierre-Victor Galtier, a prominent animal pathologist of the 19th century, professor at the veterinary school of Lyon. His death in 1908 prevented him from being awarded the Nobel Prize for his work on rabies.

== Population ==
Historical population
Year	Pop.	±% p.a.
1968	4,096	—
1975	3,760	−1.22%
1982	3,542	−0.85%
1990	3,380	−0.58%
1999	3,095	−0.97%
2007	3,115	+0.08%
2012	2,950	−1.08%
2017	2,891	−0.40%
2023	2,836	−0.32%
Source: INSEE

== See also ==
- Communes of the Lozère department
