= Louis Thuillier =

French biologist

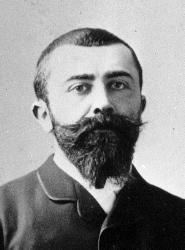
Louis Thuillier ca. 1880

Louis Thuillier (4 May 1856 – 19 September 1883) was a French biologist from Amiens. He studied biology and physics in Amiens and Paris, and in 1880 went to work as an assistant in the laboratory of Louis Pasteur.

With Pasteur and his colleagues, Thuillier was instrumental in developing vaccinations against rabies, swine fever and anthrax. In 1882-83 Thuillier was sent throughout Germany and Austria-Hungary, conducting a series of vaccinations of sheep and cattle against anthrax. On these trips he did further research of the disease, and conducted an ongoing correspondence of letters with Pasteur. These letters mention the successes and disappointments Thuillier had with the vaccine, and have been translated into English as "Correspondence of Pasteur and Thuillier, Concerning Anthrax and Swine Fever Vaccinations".

In 1883 he was sent on a mission to Alexandria with Pierre Paul Émile Roux (1853-1933) and Edmond Nocard (1850-1903) to study an epidemic of cholera. Thuillier contracted the disease and died on September 19, 1883, at the age of 27.
