= Casein hydrolysate media =

General purpose culture medium

Casein hydrolysate media is a general purpose culture medium used for cultivating various bacteria. It contains hydrolyzed casein as a source of amino acids, various minerals that are required for growth, and sodium or potassium phosphate as a buffering agent. Casein hydrolysate media is used for inducing Staphylococcus aureus to produce enterotoxin, and is used to cultivate Clostridium tetani.
