= Arthur Nicolaier =

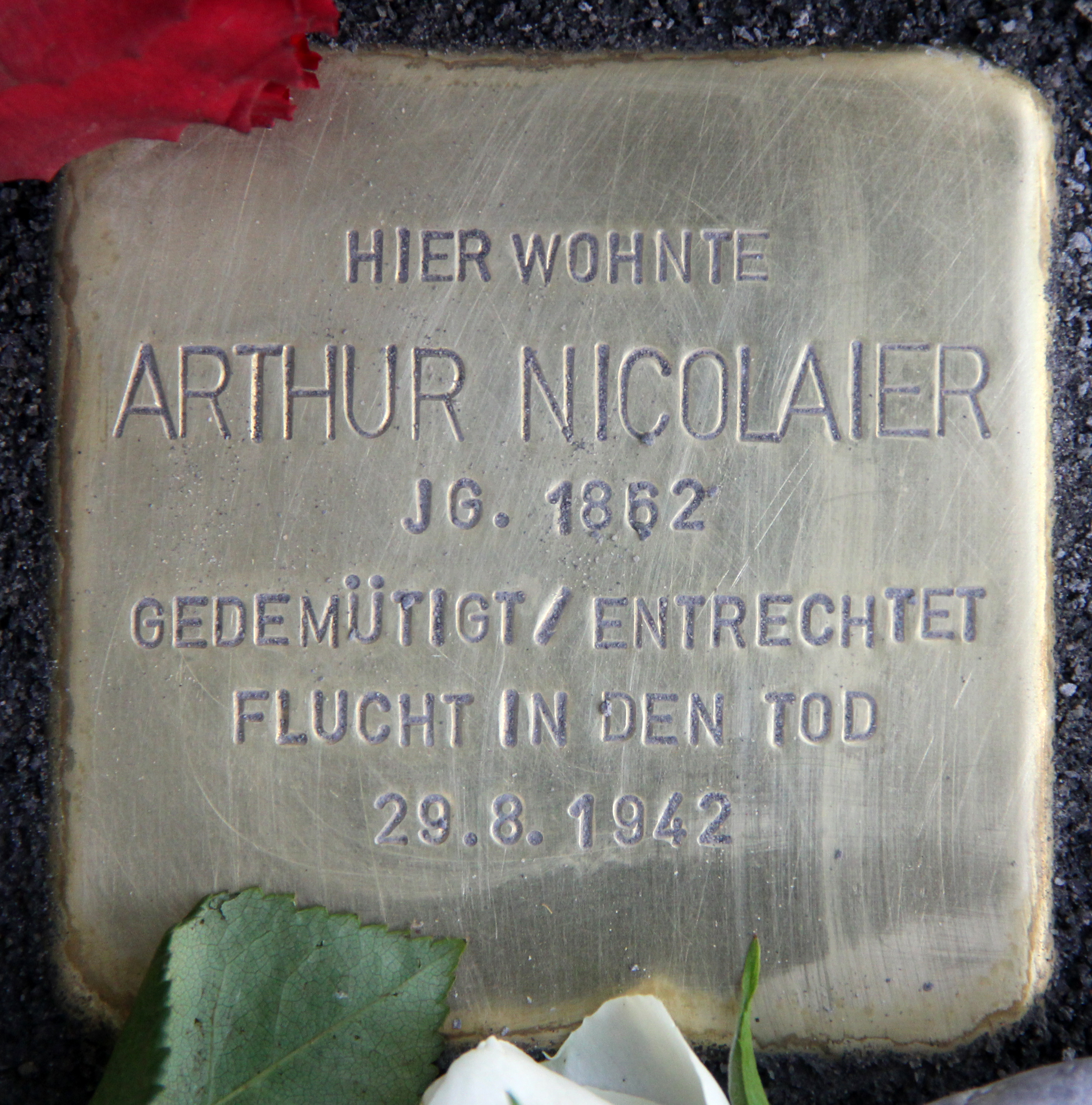

Arthur Nicolaier (4 February 1862 in Cosel, Upper Silesia, Prussia – 28 August 1942 in Berlin) was a German Jewish internist. Most famous for his work on discovering a cure for tetanus which was an extremely fatal disease if it wasn't treated in the correct way. "Beiträge zur Aetiologie des Wundstarrkrampfes" (Contributions to the etiology of tetanus). He was a senior physician at the Göttingen university hospital 1897–1900 and then moved to Berlin. In 1921, he was appointed as an extraordinary professor of internal medicine at Charité. He was removed from office in 1933 when the Nazis passed laws that made it illegal for Jews to be civil servants. He committed suicide by an overdose of morphine in 1942 when he learned that he was about to be deported to the Theresienstadt concentration camp.

== Scientific contributions ==
As an assistant to Carl Flügge in Göttingen, Nicolaier discovered Clostridium tetani, the bacterium that causes tetanus, in 1884.

He was the first to use hexamethylentetramin (Urotropin) for treating urinary infections.
