= Auguste Chaillou =

French biologist and physician

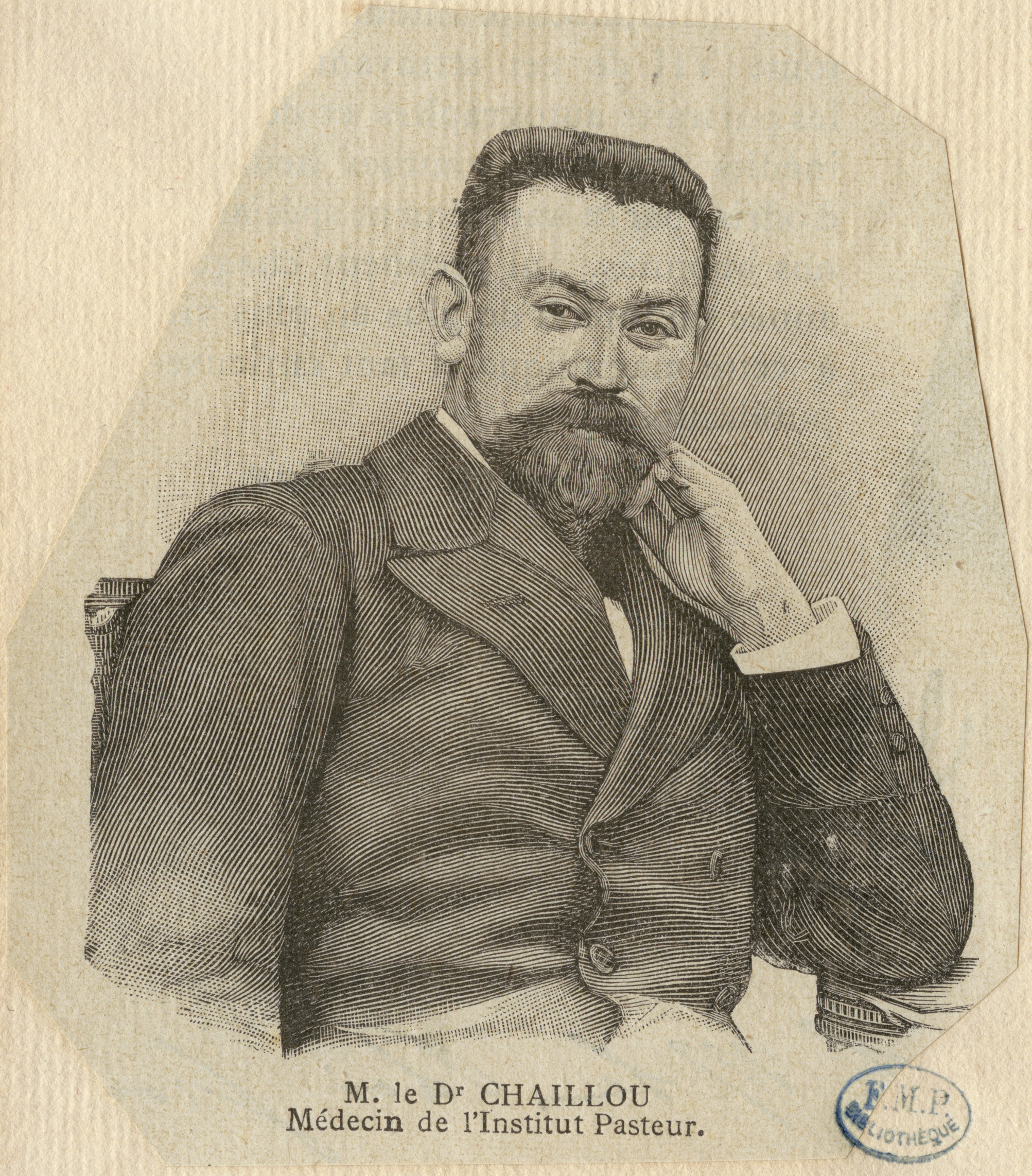
Auguste Chaillou

Auguste Chaillou (21 August 1866 – 23 April 1915) was a French biologist and physician born in Parennes in the department of Sarthe. He worked at the Hôpital des Enfants-Malades, and for most of his career was associated with the Pasteur Institute in Paris.

Chaillou is best known for his development of the anti-diphtheria serum with Émile Roux and Louis Martin (1864-1946) at the Pasteur Institute. The three men presented their findings at the Tenth International Congress of Hygiene in Budapest (1894). From 1895 until 1914 he was chief of anti-rabies services at the Pasteur Institute. As a medical officer during World War I he was killed on the battlefield of Vauquois.

== Written works ==
- La sérumthérapie et le tubage du larynx dans les croups diphtériques (1894).
- Morphologie médicale. Paris (1912) (with Leon Mac-Auliffe (1876-1937).
- Un Précis d'exploration externe du tube digestif (with Leon Mac-Auliffe).
- Etude des quatre types humains.
