= Tetanus =

Bacterial infection characterized by muscle spasms

- Other names: Lockjaw
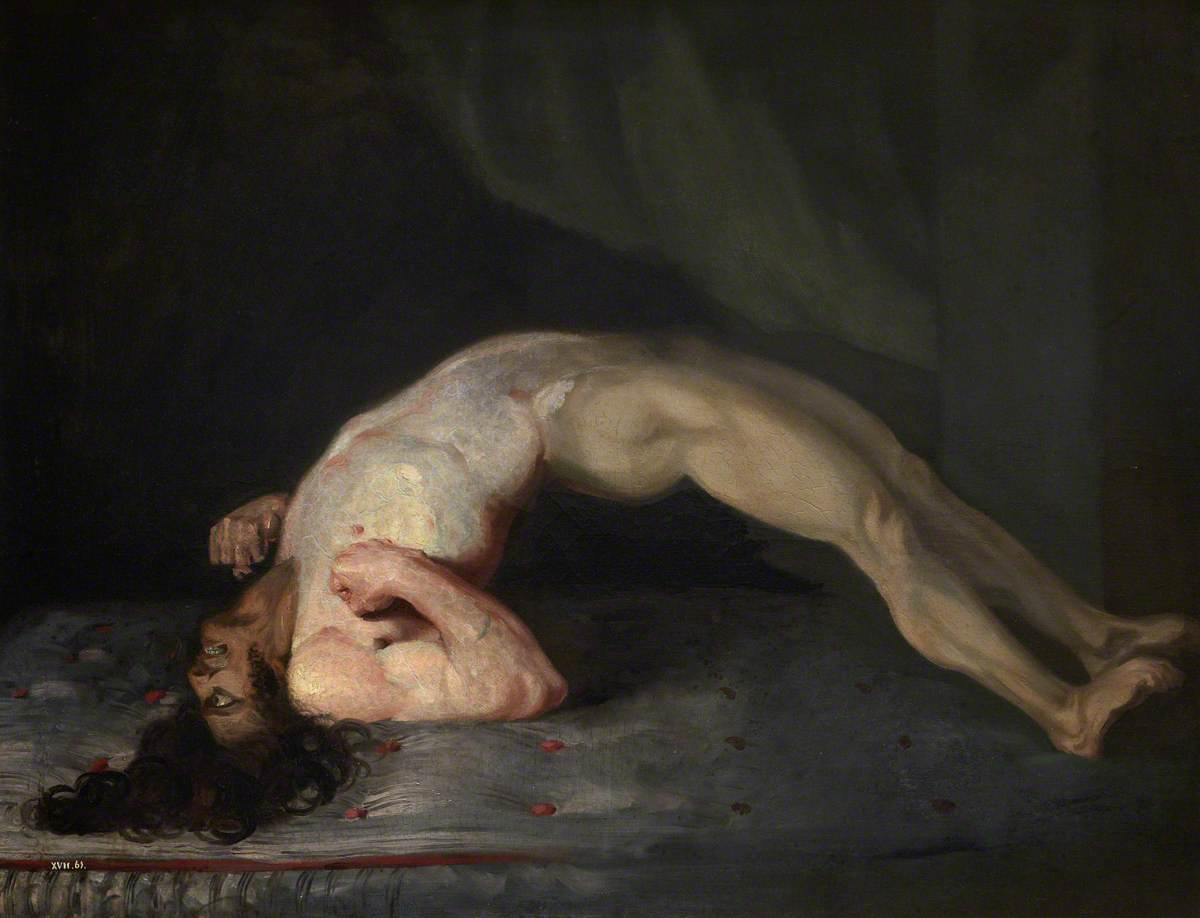
- Muscle spasms (specifically opisthotonos) in a person with tetanus. Painting by Sir Charles Bell, 1809.
- Specialty: Infectious disease, neurology, critical care medicine
- Symptoms: Fever, cramped-up jaw, muscle spasms, headache, seizures, sweating, and trouble swallowing
- Complications: Laryngospasm, respiratory failure, bone fractures
- Usual onset: 3–21 days following exposure
- Duration: Months
- Causes: Clostridium tetani
- Risk factors: Break in the skin, being unvaccinated
- Diagnostic method: Based on symptoms
- Prevention: Tetanus vaccine
- Treatment: Tetanus immune globulin, muscle relaxants, mechanical ventilation
- Medication: Diazepam, methocarbamol
- Prognosis: 6.4% risk of death
- Frequency: 53,478 (2023)
- Deaths: 19,758 (2023)

Tetanus, also known as lockjaw, is a bacterial infection caused by Clostridium tetani and characterized by muscle spasms. In the most common type, the spasms begin in the jaw and then progress to the rest of the body. Each spasm usually lasts for a few minutes. Spasms occur frequently for three to four weeks. Some spasms may be severe enough to fracture bones. Other symptoms of tetanus may include fever, sweating, headache, trouble swallowing, high blood pressure, and a fast heart rate. The onset of symptoms is typically 3 to 21 days following infection. Recovery may take months; about 10% of cases prove to be fatal.

C. tetani is commonly found in soil, saliva, dust, and manure. The bacteria generally enter through a break in the skin, such as a cut or puncture wound caused by a contaminated object. They produce toxins that interfere with normal muscle contractions. Diagnosis is based on the presenting signs and symptoms. The disease does not spread between people.

Tetanus can be prevented by immunization with the tetanus vaccine. In those with a significant wound and who have had fewer than three doses of the vaccine, both vaccination and tetanus immune globulin are recommended. The wound should be cleaned, and any dead tissue removed. In those who are infected, tetanus immune globulin, or, if unavailable, intravenous immunoglobulin (IVIG) is used. Muscle relaxants may be used to control spasms. Mechanical ventilation may be required if a person's breathing is affected.

Tetanus occurs in all parts of the world but is most frequent in hot and wet climates where the soil has a high organic content. In 2015, there were about 209,000 infections and about 59,000 deaths globally. This is down from 356,000 deaths in 1990. In the US, since 2010, there have been fewer than 40 reported cases each year, almost all of which were in people who had not been vaccinated. An early description of the disease was made by Hippocrates in the 5th century BC. The cause of the disease was determined in 1884 by Antonio Carle and Giorgio Rattone at the University of Turin, and a vaccine was developed in 1924.

== Signs and symptoms ==
Tetanus often begins with mild spasms in the jaw muscles—also known as lockjaw. Similar spasms can also be a feature of trismus. The spasms can also affect the facial muscles, resulting in an appearance called risus sardonicus. Chest, neck, back, abdominal muscles, and buttocks may be affected. Back muscle spasms often cause arching, called opisthotonus. Sometimes, the spasms affect muscles utilized during inhalation and exhalation, which can lead to breathing problems.

Prolonged muscular action causes sudden, powerful, and painful contractions of muscle groups, called tetany. These episodes can cause fractures and muscle tears. Other symptoms include fever, headache, restlessness, irritability, feeding difficulties, breathing problems, burning sensation during urination, urinary retention, and loss of stool control.

Even with treatment, about 10% of people who contract tetanus die. The mortality rate is higher in unvaccinated individuals, and in people over 60 years of age.

=== Incubation period ===
The incubation period of tetanus may be up to several months, but is usually about ten days. In general, the farther the injury site is from the central nervous system, the longer the incubation period. Shorter incubation periods will have more severe symptoms. In trismus nascentium (i.e., neonatal tetanus), symptoms usually appear from 4 to 14 days after birth, averaging about 7 days. Based on clinical findings, four different forms of tetanus have been described.

=== Generalized tetanus ===
Generalized tetanus is the most common type, representing about 80% of cases. The generalized form usually presents with a descending pattern. The first sign is trismus or lockjaw, then facial spasms (called risus sardonicus), followed by stiffness of the neck, difficulty in swallowing, and rigidity of pectoral and calf muscles. Other symptoms include elevated temperature, sweating, elevated blood pressure, and episodic rapid heart rate. Spasms may occur frequently and last for several minutes, with the body shaped into a characteristic form called opisthotonos. Spasms continue for up to four weeks, and complete recovery may take months.

=== Neonatal tetanus ===
Neonatal tetanus (trismus nascentium) is a form of generalized tetanus that occurs in newborns, usually those born to mothers who themselves have not been vaccinated. If the mother has been vaccinated against tetanus, the infants acquire protection through passive immunity. It usually occurs through infection of the unhealed umbilical stump, particularly when the stump is cut with a non-sterile instrument. As of 1998, neonatal tetanus was common in many developing countries, and was responsible for about 14% (215,000) of all neonatal deaths. In 2010, the worldwide death toll was approximately 58,000 newborns. As a result of a public health campaign, the death toll from neonatal tetanus was reduced by 90% between 1990 and 2010. By 2013, the disease had been largely eliminated from all but 25 countries. Neonatal tetanus is rare in developed countries.

=== Local tetanus ===
Local tetanus is an uncommon form of the disease, in which people have persistent muscle contractions in the same anatomic area as the injury. The contractions may persist for many weeks before gradually subsiding. Local tetanus is generally milder; only about 1% of cases are fatal, but it may precede the onset of generalized tetanus.

=== Cephalic tetanus ===
Cephalic tetanus is the rarest form of the disease (0.9–3% of cases), and is limited to muscles and nerves in the head. It usually occurs after trauma to the head area, including: skull fracture, laceration, eye injury, dental extraction, and otitis media, but it has been observed from injuries to other parts of the body. Paralysis of the facial nerve is most frequently implicated, which may cause lockjaw, facial palsy, or ptosis, but other cranial nerves can also be affected. Cephalic tetanus may progress to a more generalized form of the disease. Due to its rarity, clinicians may be unfamiliar with the clinical presentation and may not suspect tetanus as the illness. Treatment can be complicated, as symptoms may be concurrent with the initial injury that caused the infection. Cephalic tetanus is more likely than other forms of tetanus to be fatal, with the progression to generalized tetanus carrying a 15–30% case fatality rate.

== Cause ==
Clostridium tetani is durable due to its endospores. Pictured is the bacterium alone, with a spore being produced, and the spore alone.

Clostridium tetani bacteria cause tetanus. The disease is an international health problem, as C. tetani endospores are ubiquitous. Endospores can be introduced into the body through a puncture wound (penetrating trauma). Since C. tetani is an anaerobic bacterium, it and its endospores thrive in environments that lack oxygen, such as a puncture wound. With the changes in oxygen levels, the turkey drumstick-shaped endospore can quickly spread.

The disease occurs almost exclusively in people who are inadequately immunized. It is more common in hot, damp climates with soil rich in organic matter. Manure-treated soils may contain spores, as they are widely distributed in the intestines and feces of many animals, such as horses, sheep, cattle, dogs, cats, rats, guinea pigs, and chickens. In agricultural areas, a significant number of human adults may harbor the organism.

The spores can also be found on skin surfaces and in contaminated heroin. Rarely, tetanus can be contracted through surgical procedures, intramuscular injections, compound fractures, and dental infections. Animal bites can transmit tetanus.

Tetanus is often associated with rust, especially rusty nails. Although rust itself does not cause tetanus, rusty objects are often found outdoors or in places where soil bacteria are present. Additionally, the rough surface of rusty metal provides crevices for dirt containing C. tetani, while a nail affords a means to puncture the skin and deliver endospores deep within the body at the site of the wound. An endospore is a non-metabolizing survival structure that begins to metabolize and cause infection once in an adequate environment. Hence, stepping on a nail (rusty or not) may result in a tetanus infection, as the low-oxygen (anaerobic) environment may exist under the skin, and the puncturing object can deliver endospores to a suitable environment for growth. It is a common misconception that rust itself is the cause; a related misconception is that a puncture from a rust-free nail is not a risk.

== Pathophysiology ==
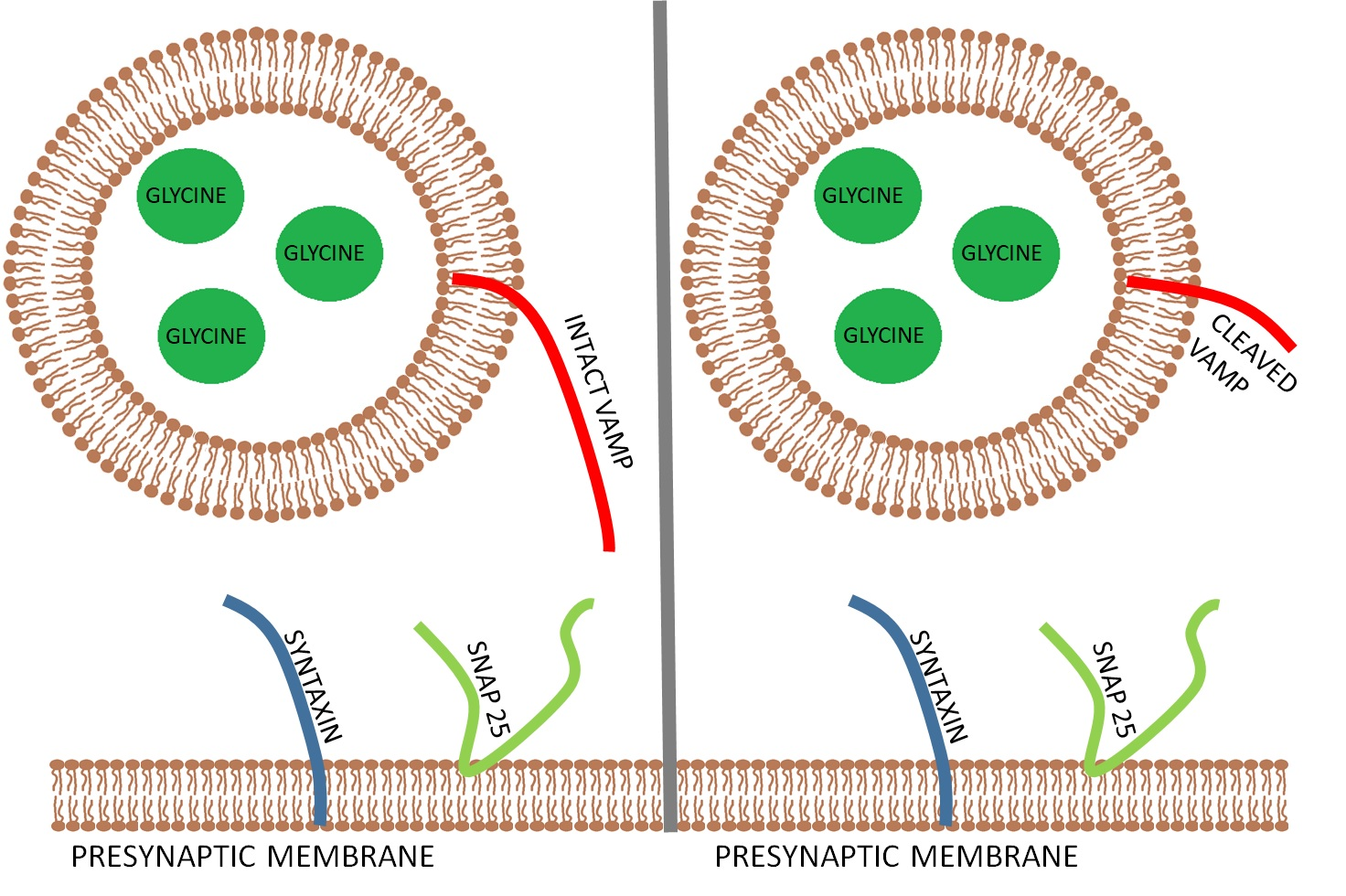
A neurotransmitter-filled vesicle before and after exposure to the tetanus toxin. The cleavage of the VAMP protein by the toxin inhibits vesicle fusion and neurotransmitter release into the synapse.

Tetanus neurotoxin (TeNT) binds to the presynaptic membrane of the neuromuscular junction, is internalized, and is transported back through the axon until it reaches the central nervous system. Here, it selectively binds to and is transported into inhibitory neurons via endocytosis. It then leaves the vesicle for the neuron cytosol, where it cleaves vesicle associated membrane protein (VAMP) synaptobrevin, which is necessary for membrane fusion of small synaptic vesicles (SSV's). SSV's carry neurotransmitter to the membrane for release, so inhibition of this process blocks neurotransmitter release.

Tetanus toxin specifically blocks the release of the neurotransmitters GABA and glycine from inhibitory neurons. These neurotransmitters stop overactive motor neurons from firing and also play a role in muscle relaxation after contraction. When inhibitory neurons are unable to release their neurotransmitters, motor neurons fire out of control, and muscles have difficulty relaxing. This causes the muscle spasms and spastic paralysis seen in tetanus infection.

The tetanus toxin, tetanospasmin, is made up of a heavy chain and a light chain. There are three domains, each of which contributes to the toxin's pathophysiology. The heavy chain has two domains. The N-terminal side of the heavy chain helps with membrane translocation, and the C-terminal side helps the toxin locate the specific receptor site on the correct neuron. The light chain domain cleaves the VAMP protein once it arrives in the inhibitory neuron cytosol.

There are four main steps in tetanus's mechanism of action: binding to the neuron, internalization of the toxin, membrane translocation, and cleavage of the target VAMP.

=== Neurospecific binding ===
The toxin travels from the wound site to the neuromuscular junction through the bloodstream, where it binds to the presynaptic membrane of a motor neuron. The heavy chain C-terminal domain aids in binding to the correct site, recognizing and binding to the correct glycoproteins and glycolipids in the presynaptic membrane. The toxin binds to a site that is taken into the neuron as an endocytic vesicle, which will travel down the axon, past the cell body, and down the dendrites to the dendritic terminal at the spine and central nervous system. Here, it will be released into the synaptic cleft and allowed to bind to the presynaptic membrane of inhibitory neurons in a similar manner to binding to the motor neuron.

=== Internalization ===
Tetanus toxin is then internalized again via endocytosis, this time, in an acidic vesicle. In a mechanism not well understood, depolarization caused by the firing of the inhibitory neuron causes the toxin to be pulled into the neuron inside vesicles.

=== Membrane translocation ===
The toxin then needs a way to exit the vesicle and enter the neuron cytosol to act on its target. The low pH of the vesicle lumen causes a conformational change in the toxin, shifting it from a water-soluble form to a hydrophobic form. With the hydrophobic patches exposed, the toxin can slide into the vesicle membrane. The toxin forms an ion channel in the membrane that is nonspecific for Na^{+}, K^{+}, Ca^{2+}, and Cl^{−} ions. There is a consensus among experts that this new channel is involved in the translocation of the toxin's light chain from the inside of the vesicle to the neuron cytosol. The mechanism is not well understood or agreed upon. It has been proposed that the channel could allow the light chain (unfolded from the low pH environment) to leave through the toxin pore, or that the pore could alter the electrochemical gradient enough, by letting in or out ions, to cause osmotic lysis of the vesicle, spilling the vesicle's contents.

=== Enzymatic target cleavage ===
The light chain of the tetanus toxin is zinc-dependent protease. It shares a common zinc protease motif (His-Glu-Xaa-Xaa-His) that researchers hypothesized was essential for target cleavage until this was more recently confirmed by experiment: when all zinc was removed from the neuron with heavy metal chelators, the toxin was inhibited, only to be reactivated when the zinc was added back in. The light chain binds to VAMP, and cleaves it between Gln^{76} and Phe^{77}. Without VAMP, vesicles holding the neurotransmitters needed for motor neuron regulation (GABA and glycine) cannot be released, causing the above-mentioned deregulation of motor neurons and muscle tension.

== Diagnosis ==
There are currently no blood tests for diagnosing tetanus. The diagnosis is based on the presentation of tetanus symptoms. It does not depend upon isolation of the bacterium, which is recovered from the wound in only 30% of cases. C. tetani can be isolated from people without tetanus. Laboratory identification of C. tetani can be demonstrated only by the production of tetanospasmin in mice. Having recently experienced head trauma may indicate cephalic tetanus--a rare form of tetanus resulting in weakened facial muscles and spasms--if no other diagnosis has been made.

The "spatula test" is a clinical test for tetanus that involves touching the posterior pharyngeal wall with a soft-tipped instrument and observing the effect. A positive test result is the involuntary contraction of the jaw (biting down on the "spatula"), and a negative test result would normally be a gag reflex attempting to expel the foreign object. A short report in The American Journal of Tropical Medicine and Hygiene states that, in an affected subject research study, the spatula test had a high specificity (zero false-positive test results) and a high sensitivity (94% of infected people produced a positive test).

== Prevention ==
Unlike many infectious diseases, recovery from naturally acquired tetanus does not usually result in immunity. This is due to the extreme potency of tetanospasmin. Tetanospasmin will likely be lethal before it provokes an immune response.

Tetanus can be prevented by vaccination with tetanus toxoid. The CDC recommends that adults receive a booster shot every ten years, and standard care practice in many places is to give the booster to any person with a puncture wound who is uncertain of when they were last vaccinated, or if they have had fewer than three lifetime doses of the vaccine. The booster may not prevent a potentially fatal case of tetanus from the current wound, as it can take up to two weeks for tetanus antibodies to form.

In children under the age of seven, the tetanus vaccine is often administered as a combined vaccine, DPT/DTaP vaccine, which also includes vaccines against diphtheria and pertussis. For adults and children over seven, the Td vaccine (tetanus and diphtheria) or Tdap (tetanus, diphtheria, and acellular pertussis) is commonly used.

The World Health Organization certifies countries as having eliminated maternal or neonatal tetanus. Certification requires at least 2 years of rates of 1 case or fewer per 1,000 live births. In 1998 in Uganda, 3,433 tetanus cases were recorded in newborn babies; of these, 2,403 died. After a major public health effort, Uganda was certified as having eliminated maternal and neonatal tetanus in 2011.

=== Post-exposure prophylaxis ===
Tetanus toxoid can be given in cases of suspected tetanus exposure. In such cases, it can be given with or without tetanus immunoglobulin (also called tetanus antibodies or tetanus antitoxin). It can be given as intravenous therapy or by intramuscular injection.

The guidelines for such events in the United States for people at least 11 years old (and not pregnant) are as follows:

| Vaccination status | Clean, minor wounds | All other wounds |
|---|---|---|
| Unknown or less than 3 doses of tetanus toxoid containing vaccine | Tdap and recommend catch-up vaccination | Tdap and recommend catch-up vaccination Tetanus immunoglobulin |
| 3 or more doses of tetanus toxoid-containing vaccine AND less than 5 years since the last dose | No indication | No indication |
| 3 or more doses of tetanus toxoid-containing vaccine AND 5–10 years since the last dose | No indication | Tdap preferred (if not yet received) or Td |
| 3 or more doses of tetanus toxoid-containing vaccine AND more than 10 years since the last dose | Tdap preferred (if not yet received) or Td | Tdap preferred (if not yet received) or Td |

== Treatment ==
Tetanus deaths per million persons in 2012 0–1 1–2 2–3 4–8 9–13 14–28 29–151

Treatment of adult tetanus was covered in a state-of-the-art review in 2025.

=== Mild tetanus ===
Mild cases of tetanus can be treated with:

- Tetanus immunoglobulin (TIG), also called tetanus antibodies or tetanus antitoxin. It can be given as intravenous therapy or by intramuscular injection.
- Antibiotic therapy to reduce toxin production. Metronidazole intravenous (IV) is a preferred treatment.
- Benzodiazepines can be used to control muscle spasms. Options include diazepam and lorazepam, oral or IV.

=== Severe tetanus ===
Severe cases will require admission to intensive care. In addition to the measures listed above for mild tetanus:

- Human tetanus immunoglobulin injected intrathecally (which increases clinical improvement from 4% to 35%).
- Tracheotomy and mechanical ventilation for 3 to 4 weeks. Tracheotomy is recommended for securing the airway because the presence of an endotracheal tube is a stimulus for spasm.
- Magnesium sulfate, as an intravenous infusion, to control spasm and autonomic dysfunction.
- Diazepam as a continuous IV infusion.
- The autonomic effects of tetanus can be difficult to manage (alternating hyper- and hypotension hyperpyrexia/hypothermia), and may require IV labetalol, magnesium, clonidine, or nifedipine.

Drugs, such as diazepam or other muscle relaxants, can be given to control the muscle spasms. In extreme cases, it may be necessary to paralyze the person with curare-like drugs, and use a mechanical ventilator.

To survive a tetanus infection, a patent airway must be maintained, and proper nutrition is required. An intake of 3,500 to 4,000 calories (15,000 to 17,000 kJ) and at least 150 g of protein per day is often given in liquid form through a tube directly into the stomach (percutaneous endoscopic gastrostomy), or through a drip into a vein (parenteral nutrition). This high-calorie diet is required because of the increased metabolic strain from the increased muscle activity. Full recovery takes 4 to 6 weeks because the body must regenerate destroyed nerve axon terminals.

The antibiotic of choice is metronidazole. It can be given intravenously, by mouth, or by rectum. Of likewise efficiency is penicillin, but some raise the concern of provoking spasms because it inhibits GABA receptor, which is already affected by tetanospasmin.

== Epidemiology ==
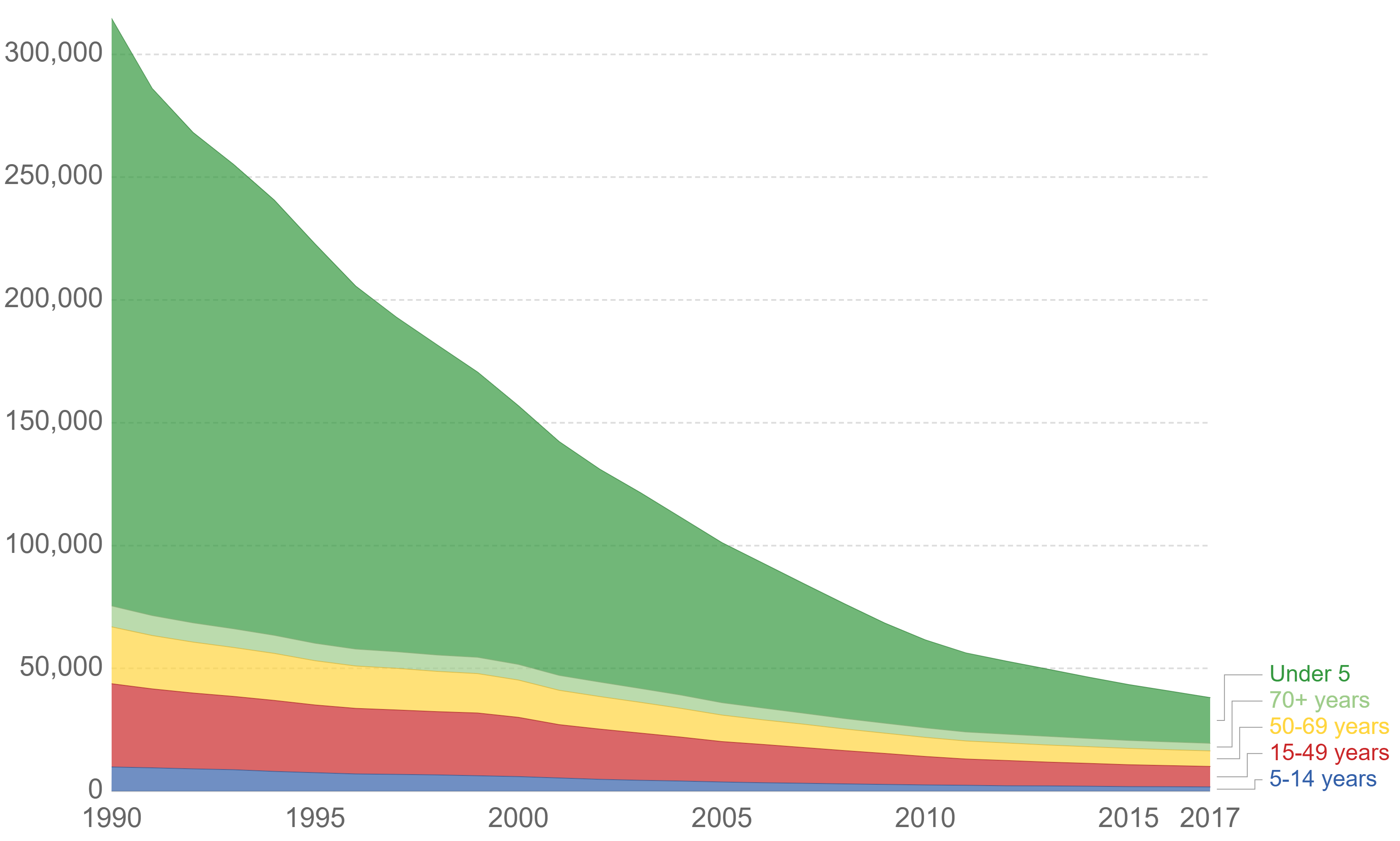
Tetanus deaths between 1990 and 2017 by age group.

In 2013, it caused about 59,000 deaths—down from 356,000 in 1990. Tetanus, notably the neonatal form, remains a significant public health problem in non-industrialized countries, with 59,000 newborns dying worldwide in 2008 as a result of neonatal tetanus. In the United States, from 2000 through 2007, an average of 31 cases were reported per year. Nearly all of the cases in the United States occur in unimmunized individuals, or individuals who have allowed their inoculations to lapse.

Number of deaths from tetanus

New infections with tetanus

== Other animals ==
Tetanus is found primarily in goats and sheep. The following are clinical symptoms found in affected goats and sheep. Extended head and neck, tail rigors (tail becomes rigid and straight), abnormal gait (walking becomes stiff and abnormal), arched back, stiffness of the jaw muscles, lockjaw, twitching of eyes, drooping eyelids, difficulty swallowing, difficulty or inability to eat and drink, abdominal bloat, spasms (uncontrolled muscular contractions) before death. Death sometimes is due to asphyxiation, secondary to respiratory paralysis.

== History ==
Tetanus was well known to ancient civilizations, who recognized the relationship between wounds and fatal muscle spasms. In 1884, Arthur Nicolaier isolated the strychnine-like toxin of tetanus from free-living, anaerobic soil bacteria. The etiology of the disease was further elucidated in 1884 by Antonio Carle and Giorgio Rattone, two pathologists at the University of Turin, who demonstrated, for the first time, the transmissibility of tetanus. They produced tetanus in rabbits by injecting pus from a person with fatal tetanus into their sciatic nerves, and testing their reactions while tetanus was spreading.

In 1891, Clostridium tetani (C. tetani) was isolated from a human victim by Kitasato Shibasaburō, who later showed that the organism could produce disease when injected into animals and that the toxin could be neutralized by specific antibodies. In 1897, Edmond Nocard showed that tetanus antitoxin induced passive immunity in humans, and could be used for prophylaxis and treatment. Tetanus toxoid vaccine was developed by P. Descombey in 1924, and was widely used to prevent tetanus induced by battle wounds during World War II.

=== Etymology ===
The word tetanus comes from the Greek τέτανος, tetanos, 'taut', which is further from the Greek τείνειν, teinein, 'to stretch'.

== Research ==
There is insufficient evidence that tetanus can be treated or prevented by vitamin C. This is at least partially because the historical trials conducted to investigate a possible connection between vitamin C and alleviating tetanus patients were of poor quality.

== See also ==
- Renshaw cell
- Tetanized state
