= Émile Roux =

French physician (1853–1933)

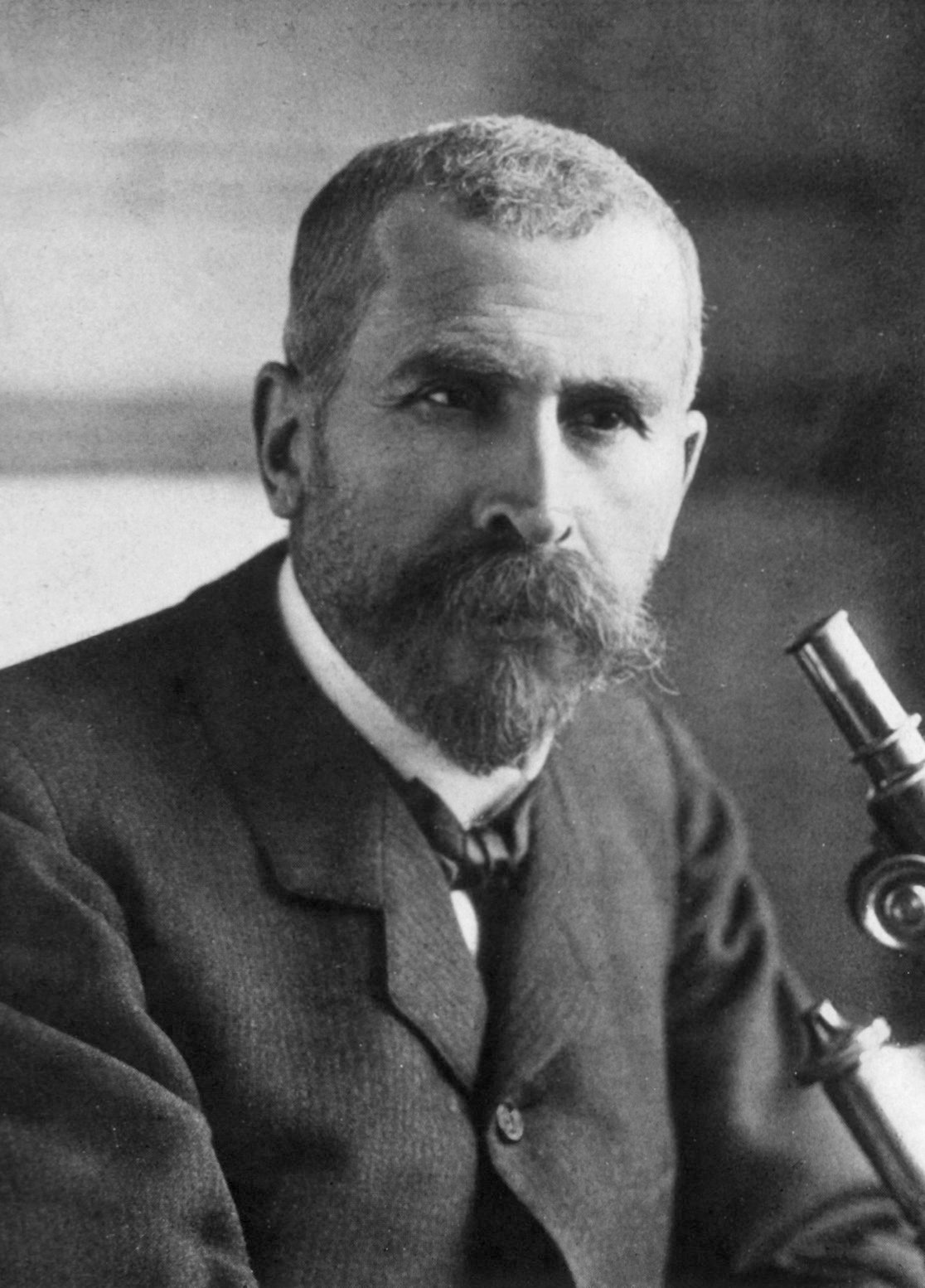
- Roux (c. 1900)
- Born: 17 December 1853; Confolens, Charente, France
- Died: 3 November 1933 (aged 79); Paris, France
- Known for: Pasteur Institute anti-diphtheria serum
- Awards: Copley Medal (1917)
- Scientific career
- Fields: Physiology, bacteriology, immunology

Pierre Paul Émile Roux FRS (French pronunciation: [pjɛʁ pɔl emil ʁu]; 17 December 1853 – 3 November 1933) was a French physician, bacteriologist and immunologist. Roux was one of the closest collaborators of Louis Pasteur (1822–1895), a co-founder of the Pasteur Institute, and responsible for the institute's production of the anti-diphtheria serum, the first effective therapy for this disease. Additionally, he investigated cholera, chicken-cholera, rabies, and tuberculosis. Roux is regarded as a founder of the field of immunology.

== Early years ==
Roux was born in Confolens, Charente. It is believed that Roux had a fatherless childhood. He received his baccalaureate in sciences in 1871 and started his studies in 1872 at the Medical School of Clermont-Ferrand. He worked initially as a student assistant in chemistry at the Faculty of Sciences, under Émile Duclaux. From 1874 to 1878, he continued his studies in Paris and was admitted as clinical assistant at Hôtel-Dieu. Between 1874 and 1877, Roux received a fellowship for the Military School at Val-de-Grâce, but quit it after failing to present his dissertation in due time. It is also believed that Roux may have been dismissed from the military for some form of insubordination. In 1878, he started to work as an assistant to the course on fermentation given by his patron Duclaux at the Sorbonne University.

In 1878, Pierre Paul Emile Roux married Rose Anna Shedlock in London, but it was kept a secret. Shedlock was a historical figure in her own right, being one of the first women medical students in Britain and Europe. Shedlock met Roux while both were in medical school in Paris. Shedlock died in 1879 of tuberculosis within days of Roux performing his critical experiments on chicken cholera vaccine. In an inaccurate biography, Roux's niece stated that Shedlock contracted tuberculosis from Roux. However, this is unlikely, given that Shedlock had symptoms before marrying Roux. According to his niece, Roux allegedly believed that marriage was an opportunity for women to satisfy their "deepest aspirations", while for men it was "mutilation".

== Work with Pasteur ==
Duclaux recommended Roux to Louis Pasteur, who was looking for assistants, and Roux joined Pasteur's laboratory as a research assistant from 1878 to 1883 at the École Normale Supérieure in Paris. When Roux first began his career with Pasteur, he started as an animal inoculator. He performed well in the technical tasks, and became more involved with research. Roux began his research on the microbiological causation of diseases, and in this capacity worked with Pasteur on avian cholera (1879–1880) and anthrax (1879–1890), and was involved in the famous experiment on anthrax vaccination of animals at Pouilly-le-Fort. In this vaccination experiment, Roux and Charles Chamberland injected 25 sheep with their anthrax vaccine, and the other 25 were unvaccinated. A few weeks later, all 50 sheep were injected with the anthrax bacillus. When it was clear that all 25 vaccinated sheep would survive, and all 25 unvaccinated sheep would die, Pasteur arrived to great fanfare.

Louis Pasteur and Émile Roux were sometimes in disagreement in their approach to disease. Pasteur was an experimental scientist, whereas Roux was more focused on clinical medicine. They also held different religious and political beliefs, with Pasteur being a right-leaning Catholic, and Roux being a left-leaning atheist. Given their many differences, they clashed often as they worked towards vaccines against anthrax and rabies. The main issues between Roux and Pasteur regarded the ethics of human experimentation. Specifically, the argued over the amount of evidence needed from animal experimentation in order to justify giving the rabies vaccine to humans. Roux was more reluctant to give the vaccine to humans without further evidence that it was safe in animals.

In 1883, Roux presented a doctoral dissertation in medicine titled Des Nouvelles Acquisitions sur la Rage, in which he described his research on rabies with Pasteur since 1881, which led to the development of the first vaccination against this fearsome disease. Roux discovered the idea of intracranial transmission of rabies, which paved the road for many more Pastorian milestones in research. Roux was now recognized as an expert in the nascent sciences of medical microbiology and immunology. With Pasteur's other assistants Edmond Nocard and Louis Thuillier, Roux traveled in 1883 to Egypt to study a cholera outbreak in humans. They were unable to find the pathogen for the disease. Thuillier, however, died while in Alexandria after contracting the disease. The bacterium Vibrio cholerae was later discovered in Alexandria by the German physician Robert Koch (1843–1910).

In 1883 and for the following 40 years, Émile Roux became closely involved with the creation of what was to become the Pasteur Institute. Roux is known for developing the concept of combining development, research, and application in a specialized hospital. The most distinctive feature of the Pasteur Hospital was free access to medical care. The hospital was also known for being very hygienic for the time period. He divided his time between biomedical research and administrative duties. In 1888, an important year in his career, he accepted the position of Director of Services, joined the editorial board of the Annales de l'Institut Pasteur, and established the first regular course on microbiological technique, which would become extremely influential in the training of many important French and foreign researchers and physicians in infectious diseases.

== Diphtheria research ==
The development of a diphtheria anti-toxin serum was a race between researchers Emil Behring in Berlin, and Émile Roux in Paris. They both developed it nearly simultaneously. However, the serum was marketed differently in each country. In Germany, the serum was marketed in a private business setting, whereas in France, the serum was distributed through a communal health care system. The race to develop the diphtheria anti-toxin serum was considered a national rivalry, although each team of researchers adopted each other's experimental practices and built off of each other. In a controversy, the first Nobel Prize for Physiology and Medicine was given to Emil Von Behring for his work on the serum therapy for diphtheria. Roux had been nominated in 1888 for the isolation of the diphtheria toxin, but didn't win the prize in 1901 because his discovery was deemed to be too "old." Over the years, Roux came close to the Nobel Prize but never won.

Also in 1883, Roux published, with Alexandre Yersin, the first of his classical works on the causation of diphtheria by the Klebs-Loeffler bacillus, then an extremely prevalent and lethal disease, particularly among children. Diphtheria is contagious microbial disease marked by throat lesions, polyneuritis, myocarditis, low blood pressure, and collapse. He studied its toxin and its properties, and began in 1891 to develop an effective serum to treat the disease, following the demonstration, by Emil Adolf von Behring (1854–1917) and Kitasato Shibasaburō (1852–1931) that antibodies against the diphtheric toxin could be produced in animals. He successfully demonstrated the use of this antitoxin with Auguste Chaillou in a study with 300 diseased children in the Hôpital des Enfants-Malades and was henceforth hailed as a scientific hero in medical congresses throughout Europe.

== Other research and later years ==
In the following years, Roux dedicated himself indefatigably to many investigations on the microbiology and practical immunology of tetanus, tuberculosis, syphilis, and pneumonia. He was elected a member of the Royal Swedish Academy of Sciences in 1900. In 1904, he was nominated to Pasteur's former position as General Director of the Pasteur Institute.

In 1916, he moved to a small apartment in the Pasteur Hospital, where he died on 3 November 1933.

== Awards and honors ==
- In 1917, he received the Copley Medal for his outstanding achievements in research.
- Asteroid 293366 Roux, discovered by French amateur astronomer Bernard Christophe in 2007, was named in his memory. The official naming citation was published by the Minor Planet Center on 12 March 2017 (M.P.C. 103971).
- The Roux culture bottle, a flask for culturing cells, is named after him.

== Gallery ==
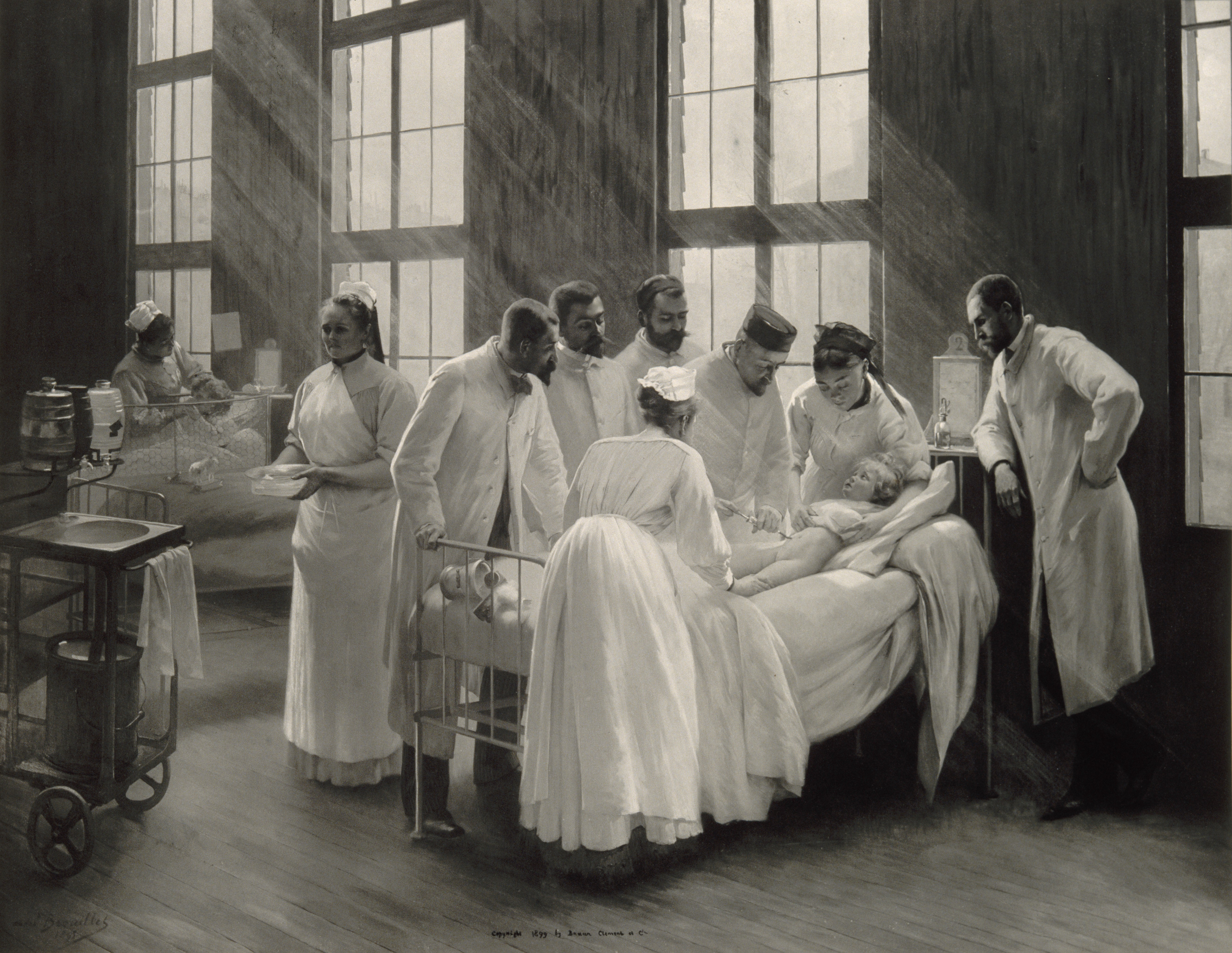
An injection against croup at the Hôpital Trousseau in Paris, with Roux observing, by P. A. A. Brouillet in 1893

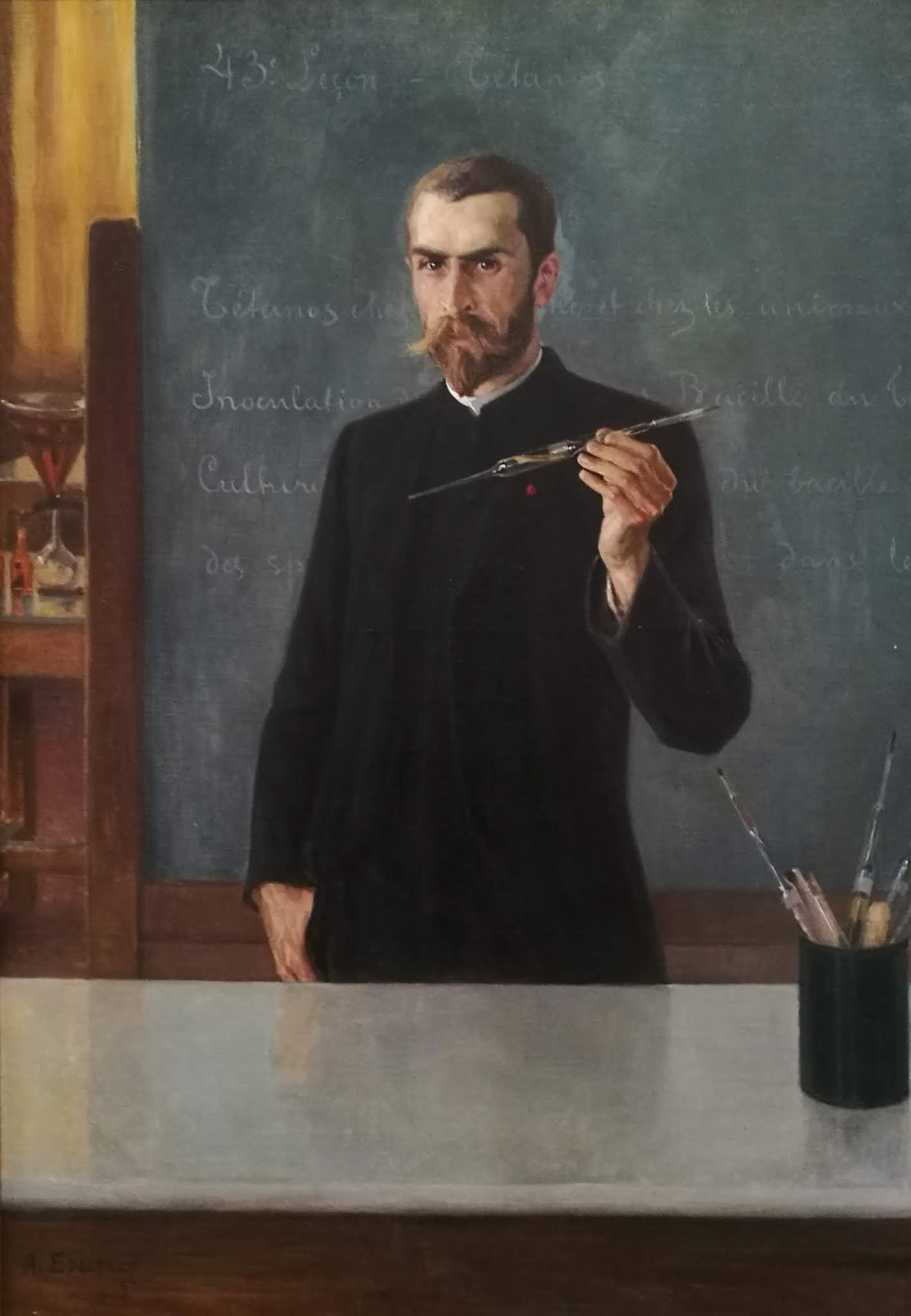
Dr. Emile Roux, Albert Edelfelt, 1896

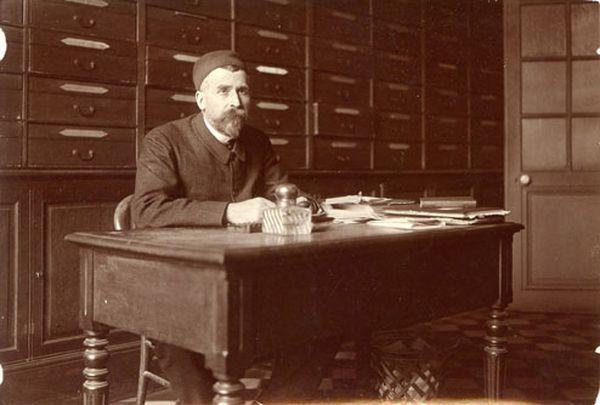
Office in 1906

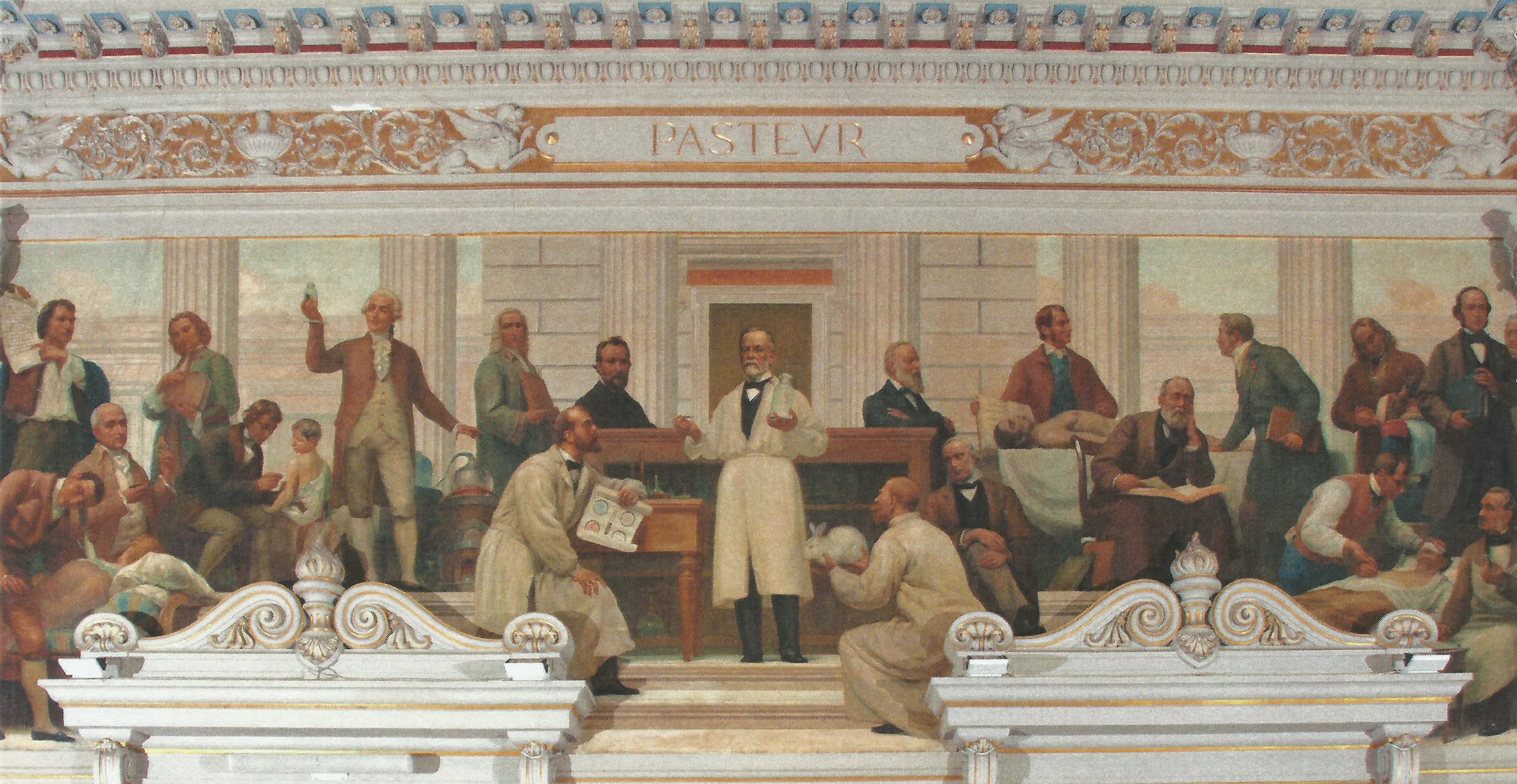
18th and 19th Century Medicine by Veloso Salgado in 1906, Pasteur at the center and Roux kneeling in front with the rabbit

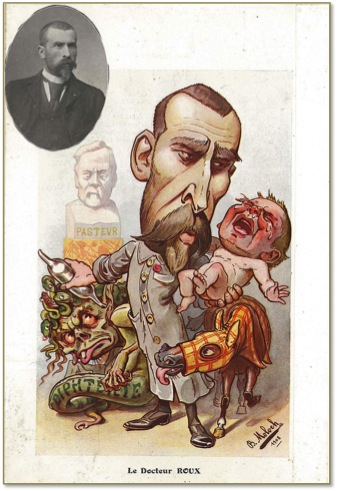
Friendly caricature of members of the Academy of Medicine designed by Hector Moloch and published in the journal Chanteclair in 1910

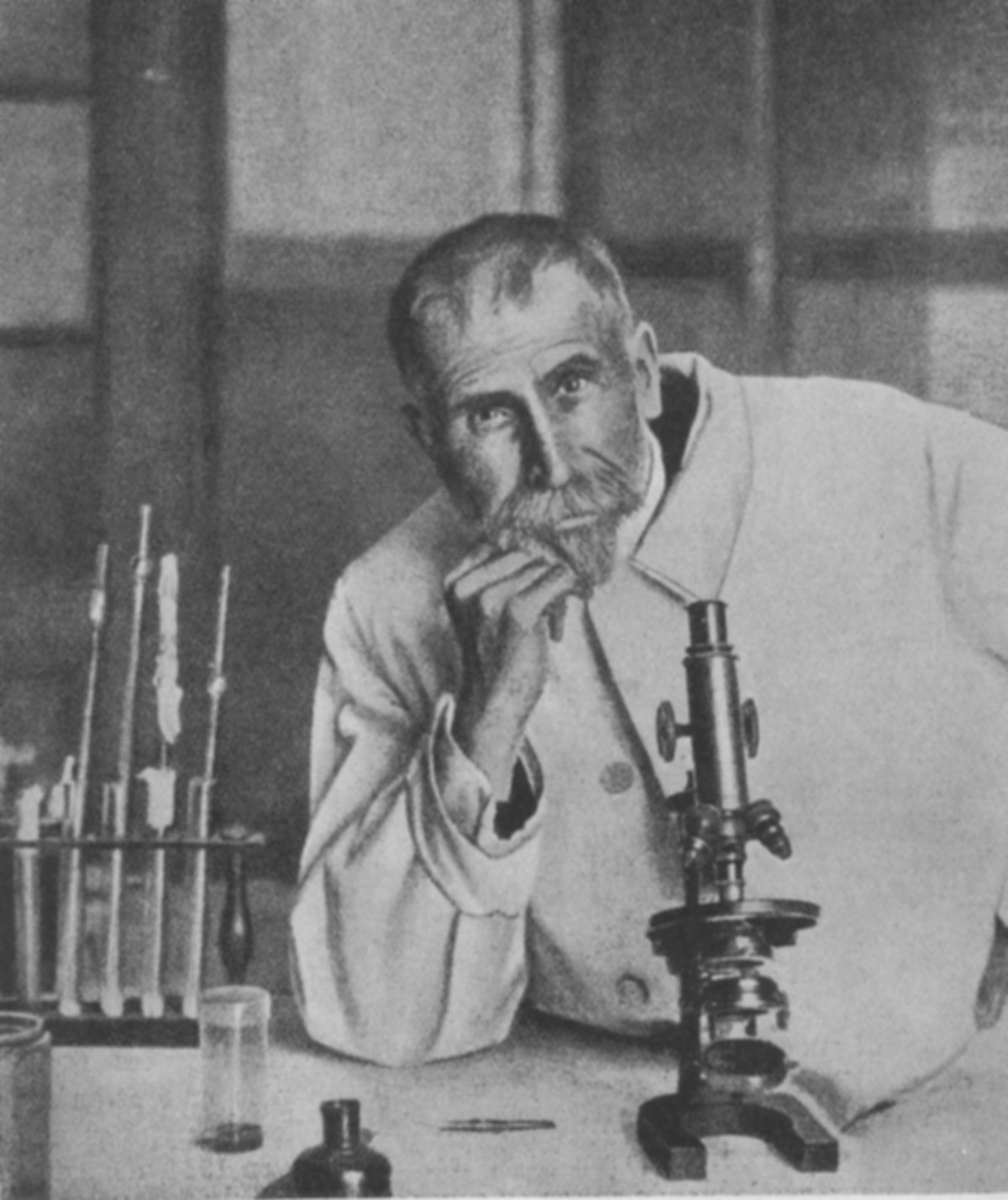
Roux, unknown date

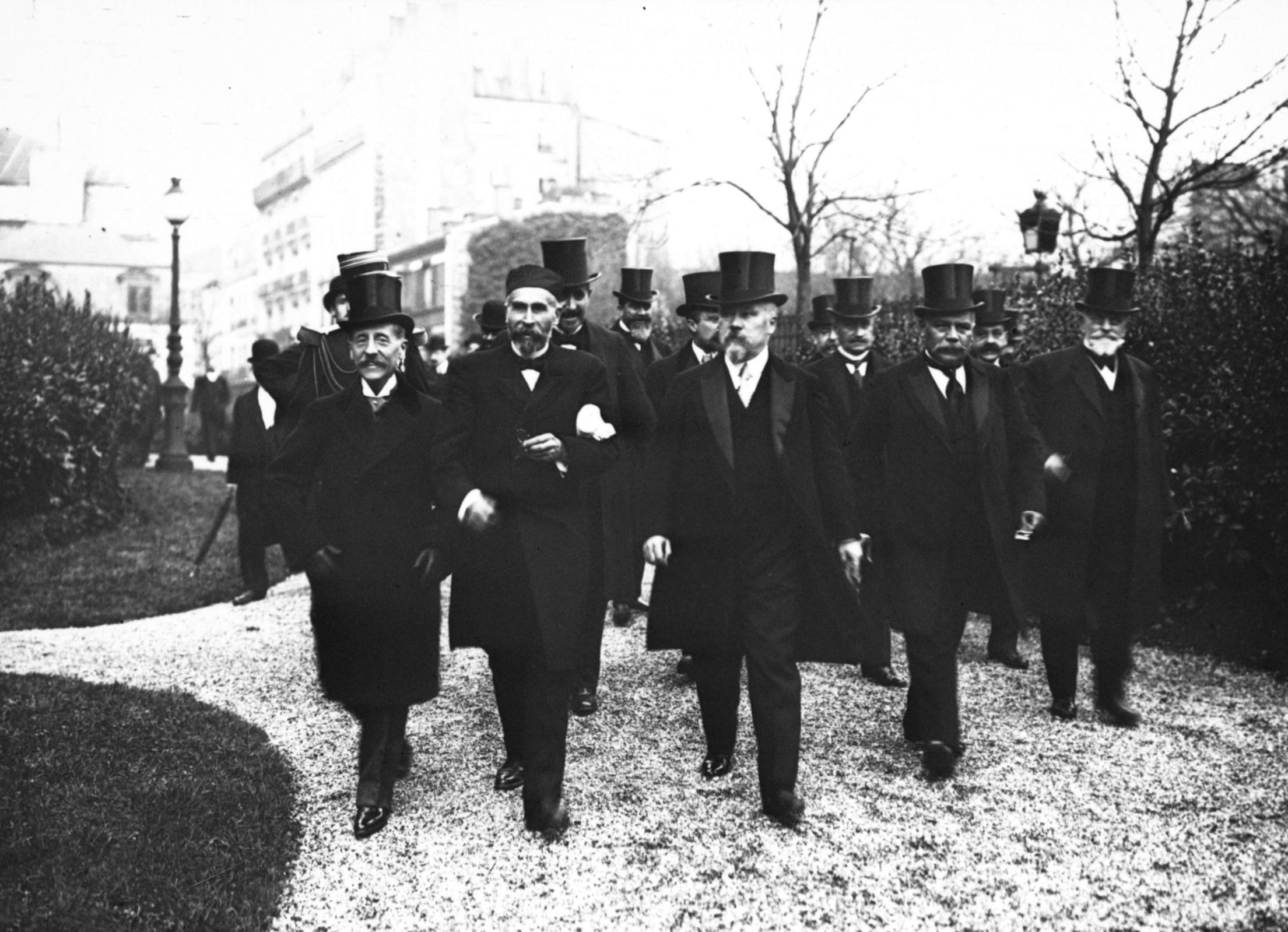
25th anniversary of the Pasteur Institute on 15 November 1913

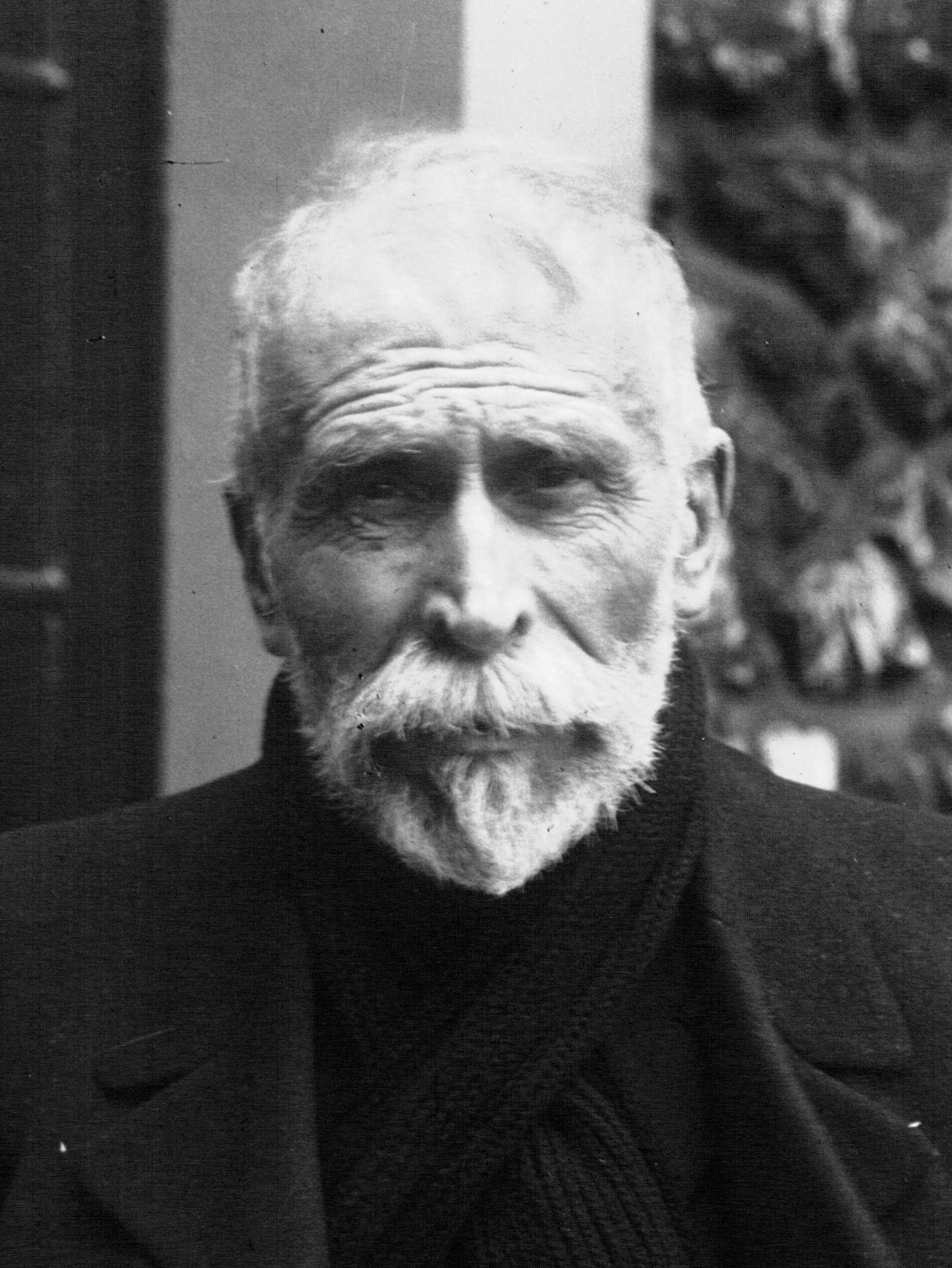
Roux in 1927
