= The Regordane Way =

Ancient French travel route

The Regordane Way is the southernmost section of the historical route that links Paris to Lower Languedoc and the Camargue. It runs from Le Puy-en-Velay, south west of St Etienne to Saint-Gilles-du-Gard to the south west of Nîmes, a distance of 211 kilometres or 140 miles.

The origin of its name is most likely that of the ancient Province through which it passes – la Regordana. This Province corresponded approximately to the triangular area linking the towns of Alés, Pradelles and Largentière.

Its existence dates back to the dawn of man and its importance certainly grew from the year 843 onwards, when it became the most easterly route of a nascent Gaul. The Regordane was the fourth most important pilgrimage route in Christendom during this era, bolstered by its strategic position as a point of departure for Santiago de Compostela, the Holy Land (St Gilles was a port at the time) and Rome.

== GR 700 ==
The GR 700 is France's newest Grande Randonnée route that follows approximately the pilgrimage path of the Chemin de St-Gilles and the mystical trail The Regordane. The Saint-Gilles Way dates back to the mid-9th century and was Christendom's fourth most important pilgrimage by the 11th century. It runs from Le Puy-en-Velay to Saint-Gilles du Gard in Camargue. The Regordane is a section of this trail that runs between Luc in Lozere and Alès at the foothills of the Cévennes.

The GR 700 runs from Le Puy en Velay to Saint-Gilles du Gard, but is not necessarily faithful to the original trails. The whole route uses the misnomer 'The Regordane Way.' This epithet is incorrect because it implies that the full route was formerly known as The Regordane, which was never the case. Moreover, the use of the word 'Way' implies a Roman origin (Way = Voie) which studies demonstrate is wrong.

== Sources ==
- Marcel GIRAULT. Le Chemin de Régordane. Nîmes, Lacour, 3e éd. 1988.
