= Vauquois =

- Commune
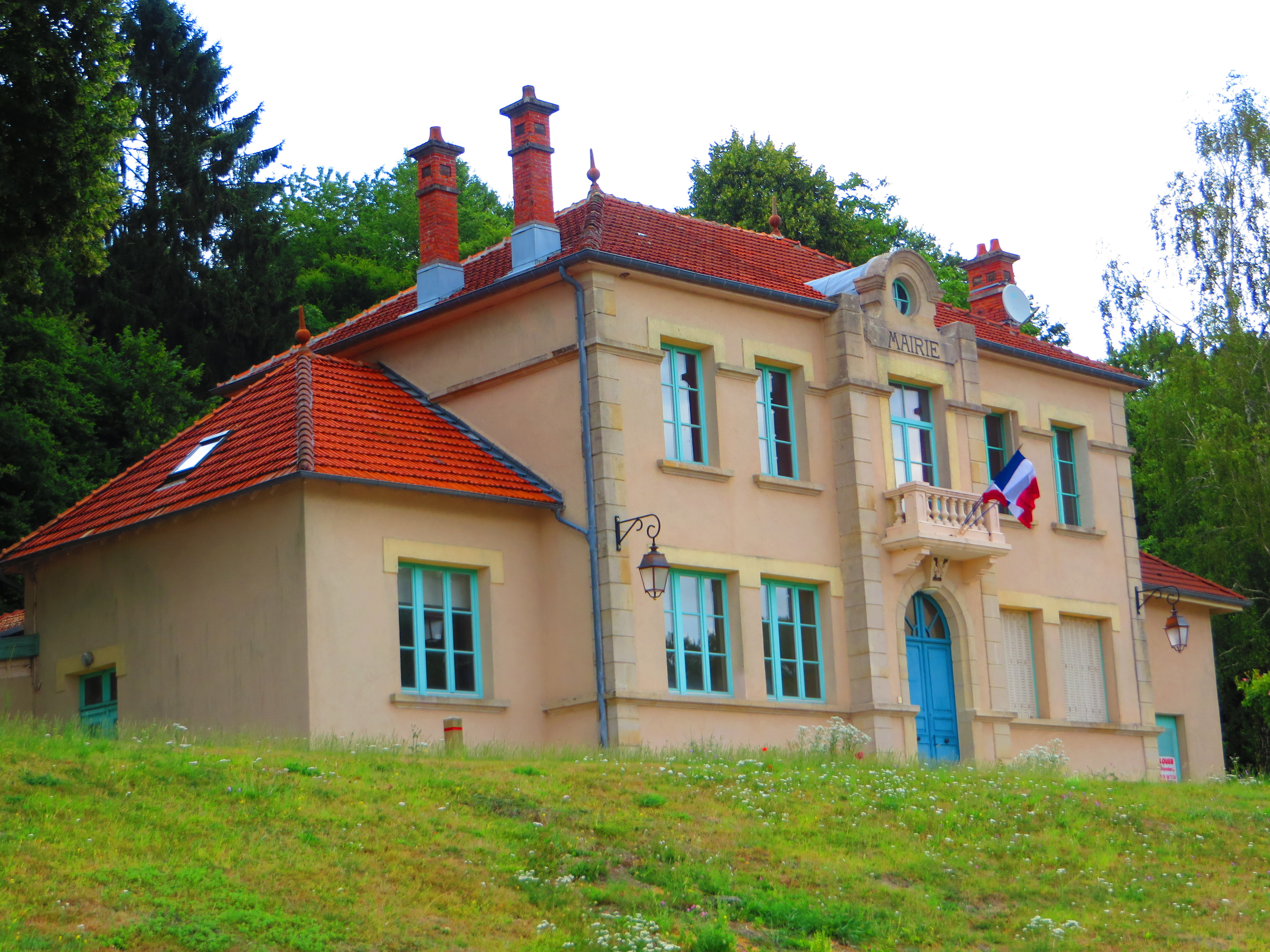
- The town hall in Vauquois

- Coat of arms
- Location of Vauquois
- Location within France Location within Grand Est
- Coordinates: 49°12′14″N 5°04′24″E
- Country: France
- Region: Grand Est
- Department: Meuse
- Arrondissement: Verdun
- Canton: Clermont-en-Argonne
- Intercommunality: Argonne-Meuse

Government
  - Mayor (2020–2026): Jean-Pierre Delandre
- Area^{1}: 8.14 km^{2} (3.14 sq mi)
- Elevation: 318 m (1,043 ft)
- Highest elevation: 290 m (950 ft)
- Lowest elevation: 184 m (604 ft)
- Population (2023): 23
  - Density: 2.8/km^{2} (7.3/sq mi)
- Time zone: UTC+01:00 (CET)
  - Summer (DST): UTC+02:00 (CEST)
- INSEE/Postal code: 55536 /55270
- ^{1} French Land Register data, which excludes lakes, ponds, glaciers > 1 km^{2} (0.386 sq mi or 247 acres) and river estuaries.

Vauquois (French pronunciation: [vokwa]) is a commune in the Meuse department in Grand Est in north-eastern France.

During World War I, Vauquois was the site of violent mine warfare, also in connection with the Battle of Verdun (1916). From 1915 to 1918, French and German tunneling units fired 519 separate mines at Vauquois, and the German gallery network beneath the village hill (the Butte de Vauquois) grew to a length of 17 kilometres (11 mi). Vauquois was destroyed and many huge craters and dugouts remain.

The French papyrologist Jean Maspero (1885–1915) died in Vauquois, as did biologist Auguste Chaillou.

== See also ==
- Communes of the Meuse department
