= Edmond Nocard =

French veterinarian and microbiologist

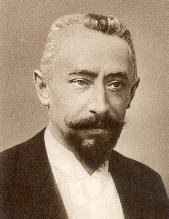
Edmond Nocard

Edmond Isidore Étienne Nocard (French pronunciation: [ɛdmɔ̃ izidɔʁ etjɛn nɔkaʁ]; 29 January 1850 – 2 August 1903), was a French veterinarian and microbiologist, born in Provins (Seine-et-Marne, France).

Nocard studied veterinary medicine from 1868 to 1871 and (after a brief service in the Army) from 1871 to 1873 in the École Vétérinaire de Maisons-Alfort. From 1873 to 1878 he was hired as Head of Clinical Service at the same school, working with Dumesnil. In 1876 he is charged with the creation of a new journal, the Archives Vétérinaires. In this journal, Nocard will publish a great number of scientific papers, on medicine, surgery, hygiene and jurisprudence. In 1878 he is approved in a public contest as Professor of Clinical and Surgical Veterinary of the École Veterinaire. Among his many pupils who became famous was Camille Guérin, co-discoverer of the Bacillus Calmette-Guérin (BCG).

In 1880 Nocard entered the laboratory of Louis Pasteur in Paris as an assistant. There, he helped Pasteur and Emile Roux in their classic experiments of vaccination of animals against anthrax at Pouilly-le-Fort. In 1883, he traveled to Egypt with Roux, Straus, and Thuiller, in order to study an outbreak of cholera there, but they were unable to isolate the germ responsible for the disease. He returned on the same year to Alfort, and established a well-equipped research laboratory, in close liaison with Pasteur's. In the next three years, Nocard demonstrated his great skills in laboratory work in the new science of bacteriology by developing a number of new techniques, such as methods of harvesting blood serum, new culture media for the bacillus of tuberculosis, the introduction of anesthesia of large animals with intravenous chloral hydrate, as well as for controlling tetanic convulsions. His scientific and academic victories were rewarded, in 1887, with the title of director of the School, and chair of infectious diseases, and, in 1888, with an invitation to become a member to the first editorial board of the Annals of the Pasteur Institute. He became a full member of the Pasteur Institute in 1895. From 1892 to 1896, he strived to convince the medical and general public, in a series of communications, conferences, booklets, and demonstrations, that the use of the tuberculin of Robert Koch could provide the foundations for the prevention of bovine tuberculosis. He published in the classic La Tuberculose Bovine : ses Dangers, ses Rapports avec la Tuberculose Humaine (The Bovine Tuberculosis: Its Dangers and its Relationship with Human Tuberculosis).

Nocard’s main contribution to medicine has been the discovery of the genre of bacteria which was named, in his honor, Nocardia. It causes nocardiosis, a disease which manifests itself mainly in animals of economic importance, such as bovine farcy, for which he discovered the first Nocardia, named by him initially as Streptothrix farcinica. The Nocardia may also cause disease in humans, particularly in immunocompromised patients, such as those with AIDS.

In the field of veterinary pathology he discovered the pathogen of endozootic mastitis, Streptococcus agalactiae. Nocard also discovered the virus which causes bovine peripneumonia and studied psittacosis.

He died on 2 August 1903 in Saint-Maurice (Marne)
