= Mont Grand =

Mountain in France

- Location within France

Highest point
- Elevation: 1,417 m (4,649 ft)
- Coordinates: 44°55′07″N 3°21′59″E

Geography
- Location: Lozère, France
- Parent range: Margeride (Massif Central)

Mont Grand is a summit reaching an altitude of 1,417 meters in the French department of Lozère.

== Geography ==
=== Location ===
Mont Grand is situated in the Margeride within the Massif Central, in the French commune of Saint-Privat-du-Fau.

=== Geology ===
The bedrock consists of granular leptynic gneiss.

== History ==
The Beast of Gévaudan perpetrated its atrocities against the population of Northern Gévaudan and its outskirts between 1764 and 1767. The majority of the attacks were concentrated between three mountains: Mont Mouchet, Montchauvet, and Mont Grand, which are approximately 15 kilometers apart.
