= Le Malzieu =

Le Malzieu may refer to one of the following places:

- Le Malzieu-Ville, a commune in Lozère, France
- Le Malzieu-Forain, a commune in Lozère, France

== See also ==
- Malzieu, a French surname
- Saint-Léger-du-Malzieu
