= Truc du Chapelat =

Mountain in France

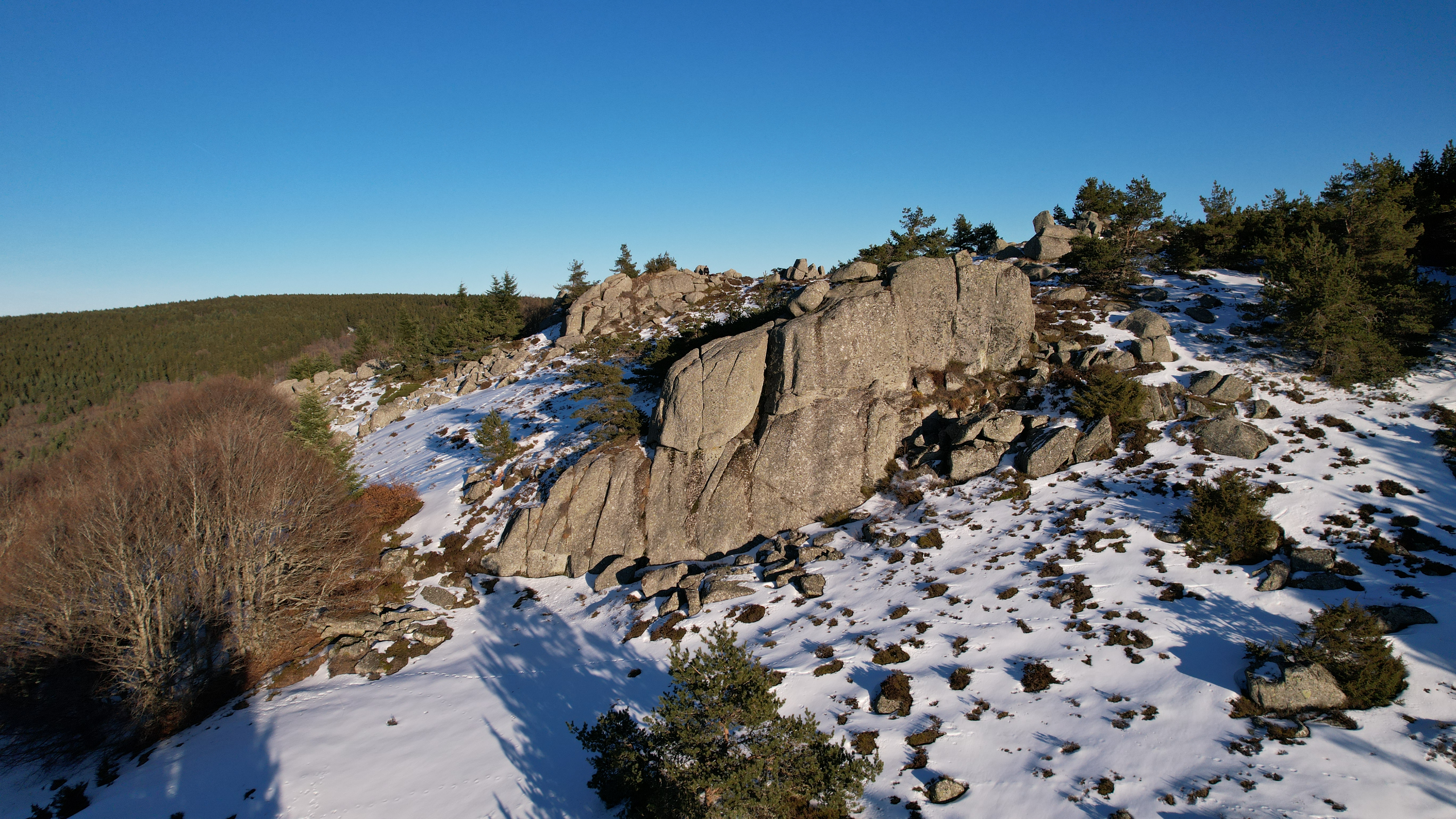

Highest point
- Elevation: 1,442 m (4,731 ft)
- Coordinates: 44°53′12″N 3°24′27″E

Geography
- Location within France
- Location: Lozère, France
- Parent range: Margeride (Massif Central)

The Truc du Chapelat (Occitan: Truc de la Capèla) is a peak in the Massif Central, part of the Margeride mountains.

== Toponymy ==
Truc refers to a "large stone or rock" in Occitan. It is also a geological feature defining a hillock, a height covered with moorland. As for Chapelat, it denotes a barren summit.

== Geography ==
The Truc du Chapelat is located on a ridge line about 2.5 km as the crow flies from Truc de la Garde, in the municipality of Malzieu-Forain in Lozère.

Its summit is crowned with a granite chaos.
