= Mouchet =

Mouchet is a surname of French origin. Notable people with the surname include:

- Catherine Mouchet (born 1959), French actress
- Louis Mouchet (born 1957), Swiss filmmaker

== See also ==
- Maquis du Mont Mouchet, a French resistance group during World War II
- Mont Mouchet, a mountain on the border of the French departments of Cantal, Haute-Loire, and Lozère
- Mouchel (surname)
