= Dumouchel =

Dumouchel is a surname of French origin, originating as a habitational name for someone from any of several places named Le Mouchel. Notable people with the surname include:

- Albert Dumouchel (1916-1971), Canadian printmaker, painter, and teacher
- Léandre Dumouchel (1811-1882), Canadian doctor and political figure

== See also ==
- Portrait of Dr. Dumouchel, a 1910 painting by Marcel Duchamp
- Mouchel (surname)
