= Puech David =

Mountain in central France

- Location within France

Highest point
- Elevation: 1,487 m (4,879 ft)
- Coordinates: 44°40′28″N 3°32′38″E

Geography
- Location: Lozère departement, France
- Parent range: Margeride (Massif Central)

Puech David is a summit in the Massif Central belonging to the Margeride mountains. Puech David is located on a ridge line approximately 2 km as the crow flies from the Signal de Randon, in the municipality of Monts-de-Randon in Lozère. The summit is accessible via the Col du Cheval Mort (1,449 m), a path then leads up towards Puech.

The original seat of the eight baronies of Gévaudan was located at Puech David.

"Puech" is the French transcription of the Occitan term "puèg" in standardized spelling, or "puèch" in Mistralian spelling, derived from the Latin "ped" which gives "podium" and means "small height, mount, hill, peak, mountain".
