= Truc de la Garde =

Mountain in France

- Location within France

Highest point
- Elevation: 1,486 m (4,875 ft)
- Coordinates: 44°52′48″N 3°26′10″E

Geography
- Location: Haute-Loire - Lozère, France
- Parent range: Margeride (Massif Central)

The Truc de la Garde (Occitan: Guardian de Truc) is a summit in the Massif Central belonging to the Margeride mountains, bordering the French departments of Lozère and Haute-Loire.

== Toponymy ==
Truc refers to a "large stone or rock" in Occitan. It is also a geological feature defining a hillock or a height covered with moorland.

== Geography ==
=== Location ===
The Truc de la Garde is situated on a ridge line. It is the highest point in the municipalities of Malzieu-Forain, Chanaleilles, and Grèzes.

At its summit crowned with granite blocks, a panorama allows for the observation of the Mézenc massif, the Devès, Mont Lozère, and the Mounts of Cantal.

=== Hydrography ===
Three springs are located on the mountain: those of Pontajou, Seuge, and Gardelle.

== Environmental protection ==
The site of the "Margeride dwarf birch stations" is the subject of a biotope protection order, covering an area of 56.7 hectares. Moreover, the Truc de la Garde is included in the Natura 2000 site "Summits and eastern slopes of Margeride".
