= Henri de Grèzes =

Henri de Grèzes (May 25, 1834 - August 5, 1897) was a French Capuchin priest and religious historian.

== Life ==
He was born in Grèzes, Haute-Loire. He joined the Capuchin order in 1853 and was ordained priest in 1857. He died in Lyon.

== Works ==
- Jeanne d'Arc franciscaine (1895)
- Histoire de l'Institut des écoles charitables du Saint-Enfant-Jésus, dit de Saint-Maur, suivie de la vie de la révérende mère de Faudoas, supérieure générale de 1837 à 1877 (1894)
- Vie du R. P. Barré, religieux minime, fondateur de l'Institut des écoles charitables du Saint-Enfant-Jésus, dit de Saint-Maur, origine et progrès de cet institut, 1662-1700 (1892)
- Archives capucines recueillies, coordonnées et annotées par le R. P. Henri de Grèzes (1891)
- Grèzes, Henri de (1891). Archives capucines : province de Provence : le couvent de Tarascon : 1612-1790 (in French). N.-D. de Lérins: Imprimerie M. Bernard.
- Saint Vernier (Verny, Werner, Garnier), martyr, patron des vignerons en Auvergne, en Bourgogne et en Franche-Comté, sa vie, son martyre et son culte (1889)
- Vie du bienheureux Félix de Nicosie, de l'ordre des FF. mineurs capucins (1888)
- L'ordre de saint François. - par le R. P. Henri de Grèzes (1885)
- Petit manuel de dévotion au glorieux thaumaturge des Frères Mineurs, saint Antoine de Padoue (1870)
- Le Sacré-Coeur de Jésus, études franciscaines, publiées à l'occasion du deuxième centenaire de la bienheureuse Marguerite-Marie (1870)
