= Nicholas Barré =

French priest (1621–1686)

Blessed Nicholas Barré, O.M.
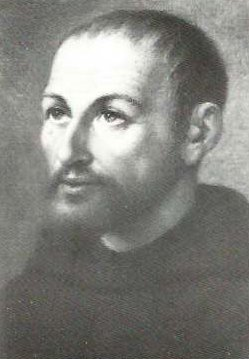

Religious, priest and founder
- Born: 21 October 1621; Amiens, Picardy, Kingdom of France
- Died: 31 May 1686 (aged 64); Paris, Kingdom of France
- Venerated in: Roman Catholic Church (France, Sisters of the Infant Jesus, Minim friars)
- Beatified: 7 March 1999, St. Peter's Basilica, Vatican City, by Pope John Paul II
- Feast: 21 October
- Patronage: Institute of the Infant Jesus
- Influenced: St. John Baptist de la Salle, Institute of the Brothers of the Christian Schools

Nicholas Barré, O.M. (21 October 1621 – 31 May 1686), was a French Minim friar and Catholic priest, who founded the Sisters of the Infant Jesus. He has been beatified by the Roman Catholic Church.

== Early life ==
Barré was born in Amiens, in the ancient province of Picardy in the Kingdom of France on 21 October 1621, the first-born and only son of Louis and Antoinette Barré. His father was one in a family line of haberdashers, a profession which had Saint Nicholas as a patron saint. As a boy, he was educated by the Jesuits, but later, in 1640, chose to join the Minims friars, founded by St. Francis of Paola, whose friars lead a very austere and penitential life. He professed religious vows in 1642.

== Ministry ==
=== Work in Paris ===
Barré was sent to Paris in 1643 to pursue his theological studies in preparation for Holy Orders. While he was still a deacon, he was asked to teach philosophy at the monastery on the Place Royale (now Place des Vosges). After his ordination to the priesthood in 1645, he assumed the office of professor of theology and librarian for the monastery's renowned library. (Note: "In his capacity as librarian, Father Nicolas Barré provided a valuable and abundant documentation to Father Francis Giry (1635-1688) for his work The Lives of the Saints, published in two volumes in 1683 and 1685" - Brother Yves Poutet, F.S.C., a historian of the origins of the Brothers of the Christian Schools)

In 1655, Barré became ill and was sent to the monastery in Amiens. There, he was appointed to work as the sacristan of the house. The calming influence of this office brought about a quick recovery.

=== Work in Rouen ===
In 1659, Barré was sent to Rouen, where he carried out his apostolate mainly with the local members of the Minim Third Order. He became widely known as a preacher and his sermons attracted a large audience.

France in the late 17th century was suffering from the effects of the Franco-Spanish War (1635–1659) and a terrible plague. In 1662, half the children in Rouen died of famine. Many were homeless and wandered the streets as beggars and, for some, prostitution became one of the few means of livelihood available.

As a result of his efforts to promote a planned parish mission in the nearby village of Sotteville-lès-Rouen, Barré came to see the suffering of the local population. He had long been concerned about those "far from God" and socially disadvantaged. He saw the need to make basic education more accessible to all. There were hardly any schools for girls and very few for boys. Most primary school teachers were poorly educated and religious education was almost non-existent.

Barré invited others to join him in meeting this need and recruited some young women who were Minim tertiaries to this end, under whom the first non-fee paying schools for girls were opened near Rouen in 1662, the St-Jean-Greaves and St-Nicolas-des-Champs schools. He urged his teachers not to wait until pupils arrived at the school; they were to seek out especially those who might have been at risk. He also set up Trade schools so that girls could earn their living. Again, the education offered was to be entirely free and any profit derived from the pupils’ work was to go to them.

While he was in Rouen, Barré was consulted by St. John Baptist de la Salle, who founded the Institute of the Brothers of the Christian Schools to educate boys.

== Congregation of the Sisters of the Infant Jesus ==
In 1666 the ladies in charge of the schools began to live in a community under a Superior. This was the beginning of a religious congregation whose main work was the education of the poor.

=== Return to Paris ===
In 1675, Barré returned to Paris where he continued to found schools, which he called the schools of the Holy Infant Jesus. He was assisted in this by Marie de Lorraine, Duchess of Guise, one of the wealthiest people in the kingdom, who funded and housed a school for training teachers of the Institute in her own palace.

Barré encouraged the first members of the Institute to offer human and spiritual support in a variety of ways depending on the needs of those they met. He encouraged them to go out to people in their surroundings; to find those who had lost direction in their lives and to look after people who were sick and abandoned:

‘It is in the valley of the greatest misfortune and tears that God is pleased to bring the soul to the heights – heights that reach even the infinity of God’s greatness. Experience shows that one can see the stars shining more brightly from the bottom of a well than in full daylight from the ground above’.

Because they lived in a house in rue St Maur the sisters became known as the Dames de St Maur. In 1691 the communities of Rouen and Paris split. The Sisters of Providence in Rouen, became a diocesan institute with a missionary outreach in Madagascar and Central Africa. The Sisters of St Maur in Paris became an institute of pontifical right with communities in five continents.

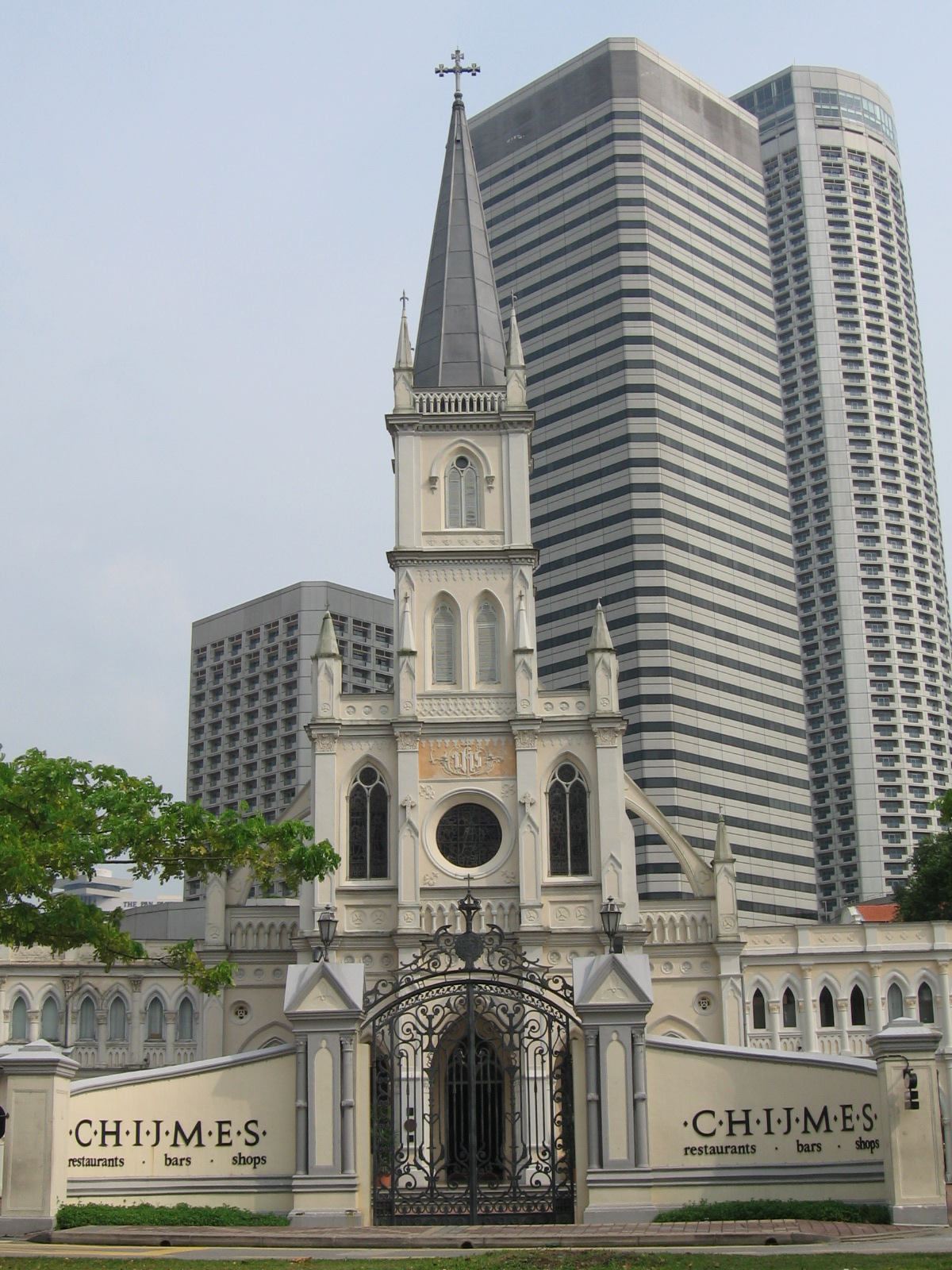
CHIJMES Complex in Singapore, named after the Convent of the Holy Infant Jesus, inspired by Nicolas Barré

== Death ==
Nicolas Barré’s health, never too robust, was deteriorating and eventually he was confined to the infirmary in his Minim community. He continued to see people who came to visit him and to deal with the concerns of his newly founded institute. He died in Paris on 31 May 1686 at the age of 64.

== Legacy ==
The work of Nicolas Barré is carried on today worldwide by the Institute of Infant Jesus Sisters and by the women and men who take him as their inspiration.

Barré's spiritual writings were approved by theologians on 5 May 1936. Barré was beatified on 7 March 1999 by Pope John Paul II at St. Peter's Basilica in Rome, where 7,000 children from his schools were present to witness the beatification ceremony.

== Bibliography ==
- Henri de Grèzes, Vie du R. P. Barré, religieux minime, fondateur de l'Institut des écoles charitables du Saint-Enfant-Jésus, dit de Saint-Maur, origine et progrès de cet institut, 1662-1700 (1892)
- Canon Ch Shoemaker, RP Nicolas Barré, the order of Minims. Founder of the Charitable Mistresses of Holy Child Jesus, called of Saint Maur 1621-1686, Library Saint Paul, Paris, 1938.
- John Harang, The Spiritual Life and Management of Ames School RP Nicolas Barré Alsatia Editions, Paris, 1938.
- Complete Works - Nicolas Barré - Cerf - 1994
- Brigitte Flourez, Walker in the night: Nicolas Barré 1621-1686, St. Paul Editions, Paris, 1992 and 1994.
- Nuria Gelpi, Nicolas Barré, pedagogo there guía, CPL, Barcelona.
- Giovanni Roma, Happiness is in the heart "Nicolas Barré Velar Editions, 1998.
- Marie-Claude and Marie-Thérèse Dinet Flourez, Nicolas Barré, the education of the poor in the seventeenth and eighteenth centuries - Papers from the University of Artois - Artois University Press - 1999

== Sources ==
- Osservatore Romano : 1999 n.8 p. 2 - n.10 p. 1.3.6
- Documentation Catholique : 1999 n.7 p. 310-312
- Prions en Église - N° 262 - page 20 - Éditions Bayard
