= Moure de la Gardille =

Mountain in central France

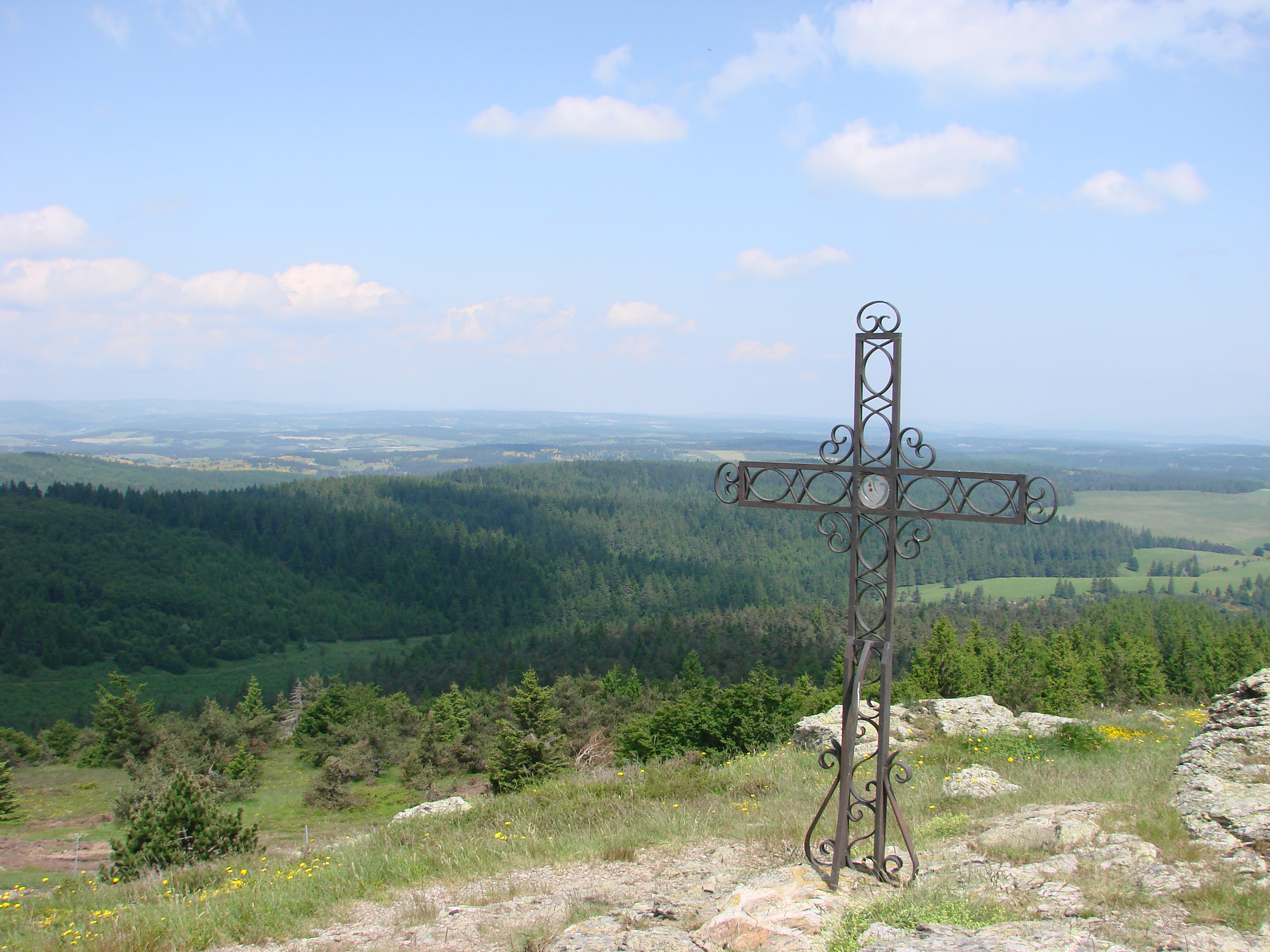

Highest point
- Elevation: 1,503 m (4,931 ft)
- Coordinates: 44°35′28″N 3°47′32″E

Geography
- Location within France
- Location: Lozère departement, France
- Parent range: Margeride (Massif Central)

The Moure de la Gardille is a summit of the Massif Central belonging to the Margeride mountains in Lozère. It is located near Mont Lozère.

== Geography ==
=== Location ===
The Moure de la Gardille is located near the Mercoire forest, facing the Montagne du Goulet, between the Cévennes and the Margeride, approximately 35 km from Mende.

=== Hydrography ===
Two important sources are located on the mountain, less than two kilometers apart: those of the Allier and the Chassezac. However, these two rivers do not feed the same basin. Indeed, the Allier flows into the Loire while the Chassezac - although originating west of the Allier - descends towards the Ardèche and the Vallée du Rhône.
