= Roc de Fenestre =

Mountain in central France

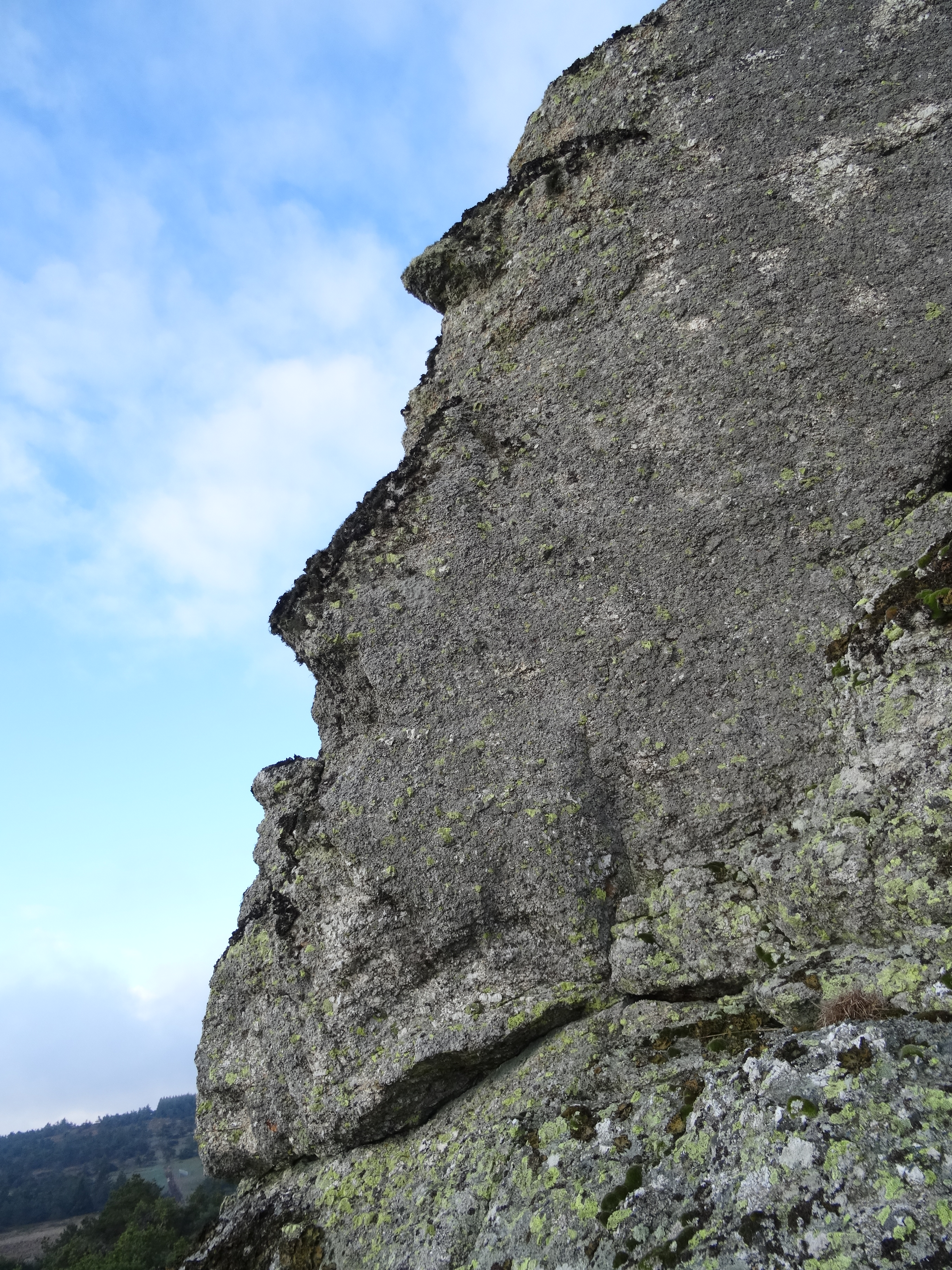

Highest point
- Elevation: 1,489 m (4,885 ft)
- Coordinates: 44°44′57″N 3°34′01″E

Geography
- Location within France
- Location: Lozère departement, France
- Parent range: Margeride (Massif Central)

The Roc de Fenestre (Occitan: Ròc de Finestra) is a peak in the Margeride, a mountainous region of the Massif Central. It reaches an altitude of 1,489 meters in the Lozère department, in the municipality of La Panouse.

A glazed lava orientation table was erected in 1995, created by Marie-Noëlle Lapouge.
