= Malzieu =

Malzieu is a French surname. Notable people with the surname include:

- Julien Malzieu (born 1983), French rugby union and sevens player
- Mathias Malzieu (born 1974), French musician

== See also ==
- Le Malzieu (disambiguation)
