= Serre Haut =

Mountain in France

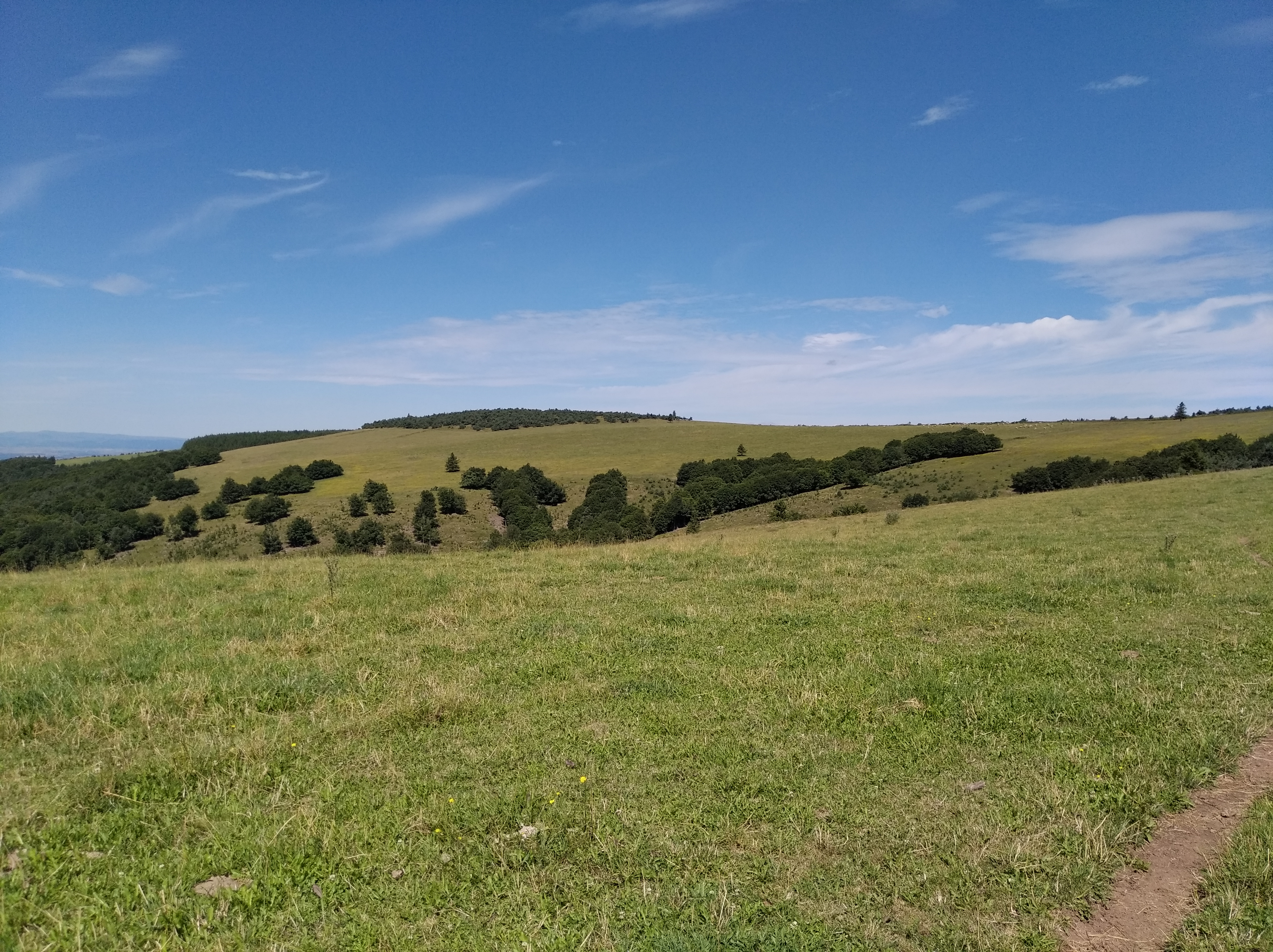
- View of the summit of Serre Haut.

Highest point
- Elevation: 1,431 m (4,695 ft)
- Coordinates: 45°00′38″N 3°18′46″E

Geography
- Location within France
- Location: Cantal, France
- Parent range: Margeride (Massif Central)

The Serre Haut is a summit in the Massif Central, belonging to the Margeride mountains in the French department of Cantal.

== Toponymy ==
The word "serre" can mean either a ridgeline or an elongated summit.

== Geography ==
The Serre Haut is located within the municipality of Clavières, on a ridgeline that defines the watershed between the Truyère and Allier rivers.

The mountain is home to heathlands with heather and broom.
