= Signal de Randon =

Mountain in central France

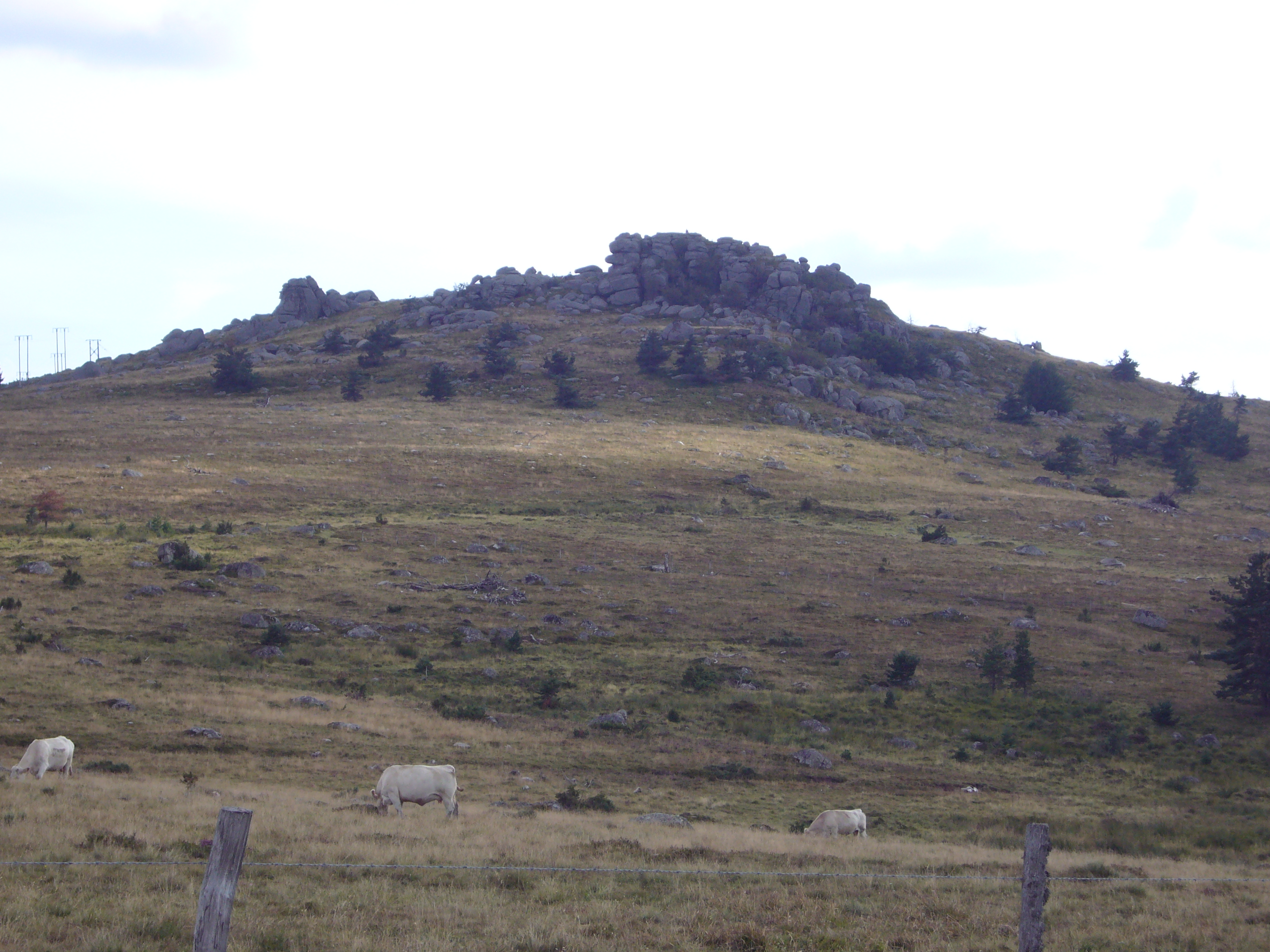

Highest point
- Elevation: 1,551 m (5,089 ft)
- Coordinates: 44°39′23″N 3°32′35″E

Geography
- Location within France
- Location: Lozère departement, France
- Parent range: Margeride (Massif Central)

The Signal de Randon is the highest summit of Margeride in the Massif Central, France.

== Etymology ==
Its name comes from the Gallic randa "limits" and the suffix on. In fact, the summit is on the boundary between the archpriestrics of Saugues and Javols, and probably takes up an older boundary.

== Geography and geology ==
The Signal de Randon and the truc de Fortunio are the highest points of the Margeride horst and are characterized by a typical granite landscape, with numerous chaotic granite rock piles fractured by diaclases and then cleared and rounded by erosion.

== Access ==
The summit can be reached from the Col du Cheval Mort and by following the hiking trails.
