= Saugues =

- Commune
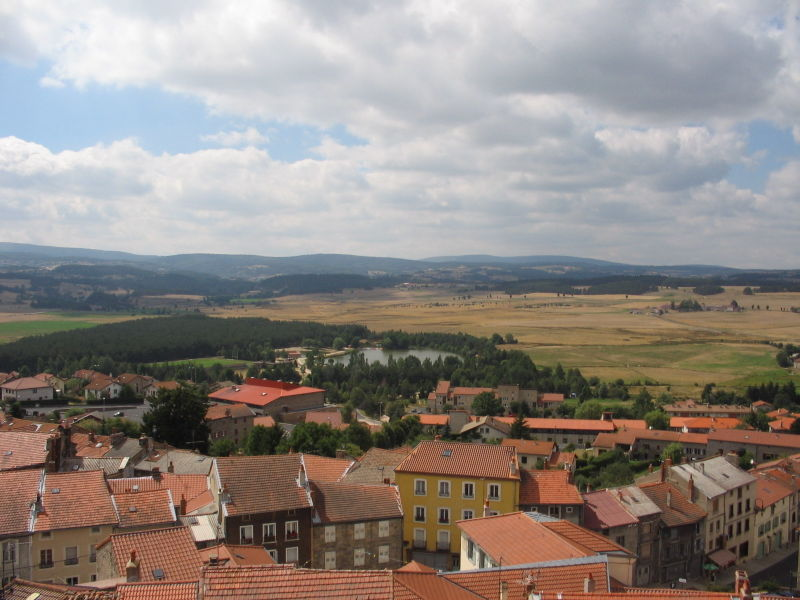

- Flag Coat of arms
- Location of Saugues
- Location within France Location within Auvergne-Rhône-Alpes
- Coordinates: 44°57′39″N 3°32′53″E
- Country: France
- Region: Auvergne-Rhône-Alpes
- Department: Haute-Loire
- Arrondissement: Brioude
- Canton: Gorges de l'Allier-Gévaudan

Government
  - Mayor (2020–2026): Joël Plantin
- Area^{1}: 78.8 km^{2} (30.4 sq mi)
- Elevation: 960 m (3,150 ft)
- Highest elevation: 1,485 m (4,872 ft)
- Lowest elevation: 661 m (2,169 ft)
- Population (2023): 1,652
  - Density: 21.0/km^{2} (54.3/sq mi)
- Time zone: UTC+01:00 (CET)
  - Summer (DST): UTC+02:00 (CEST)
- INSEE/Postal code: 43234 /43170
- ^{1} French Land Register data, which excludes lakes, ponds, glaciers > 1 km^{2} (0.386 sq mi or 247 acres) and river estuaries.

Saugues (French pronunciation: [soɡ]; Occitan: Saug) is a commune in the Haute-Loire department in south-central France.

== Geography ==
The municipality lies in the Margeride mountains, with its highest point reached at the summit of Montchauvet at an altitude of 1,485 meters.

The town lies 45 km (28 mi) west of Le Puy-en-Velay.

== History ==
A former stronghold of the Gévaudan, Saugues grew in the 12th century under the authority of the Bishops of Mende and the Lords of Mercœur. A fire in 1788 destroyed most of the town's historical centre.

It is in the mountains around and near Saugues that the famous beast of Gévaudan is said to have originated.

=== The Pilgrimage to Compostela ===
Saugues is situated on the Via Podiensis, a variant route of the Way of St. James pilgrimage to Santiago de Compostela.

Pilgrims arrive in the town from Monistrol-d'Allier, and continue to the next communes of Chanaleilles, La Dômerie du Sauvage and La Chapelle Saint-Roch.

Saugues was the traditional meeting point for pilgrims coming from Auvergne, as the path coming from Brioude made them able to avoid Le Puy-en-Velay and instead wind though the Allier river valley through Langeac, Chanteuges and Pourcheresse forest, connecting them to the secondary tracks that took pilgrims from Cantal and Puy-de-Dôme.

=== The Confraternity of Penitents ===
The Confrérie des Pénitents, or the Confraternity of Penitents, was founded in Saugues on 14 May 1652, with the permission of the Monseigneur of Marcillac and under the leadership of five of the town's nobles; Lord of Courère Antoine de Langlade, Lord of Valletta Jacques de Langlade, both canons of the local collegiate church of Saint Médard, the Royal Notary Jacques de Langlade, the bourgeois Benoît Paparic, and the apothecary Antoine Pichot. The confraternity was officially recognised by a bull from the Archconfraternity of the Gonfalone in Rome.

== Population ==
Historical population
Year	Pop.	±% p.a.
1968	2,493	—
1975	2,371	−0.71%
1982	2,288	−0.51%
1990	2,089	−1.13%
1999	2,013	−0.41%
2007	1,898	−0.73%
2012	1,822	−0.81%
2017	1,736	−0.96%
2023	1,652	−0.82%
Source: INSEE

== Sights ==
Famous for its woodturning of "esclops" (clogs), Saugues is rich in old houses and dominated by La Tour des Anglais, a square keep dating back to the 13th century. The tower takes its name from an episode of the Hundred Years War, when a troupe of English Routiers besieged the town.

== See also ==
- Communes of the Haute-Loire department
