= Truc de Fortunio =

Mountain in central France

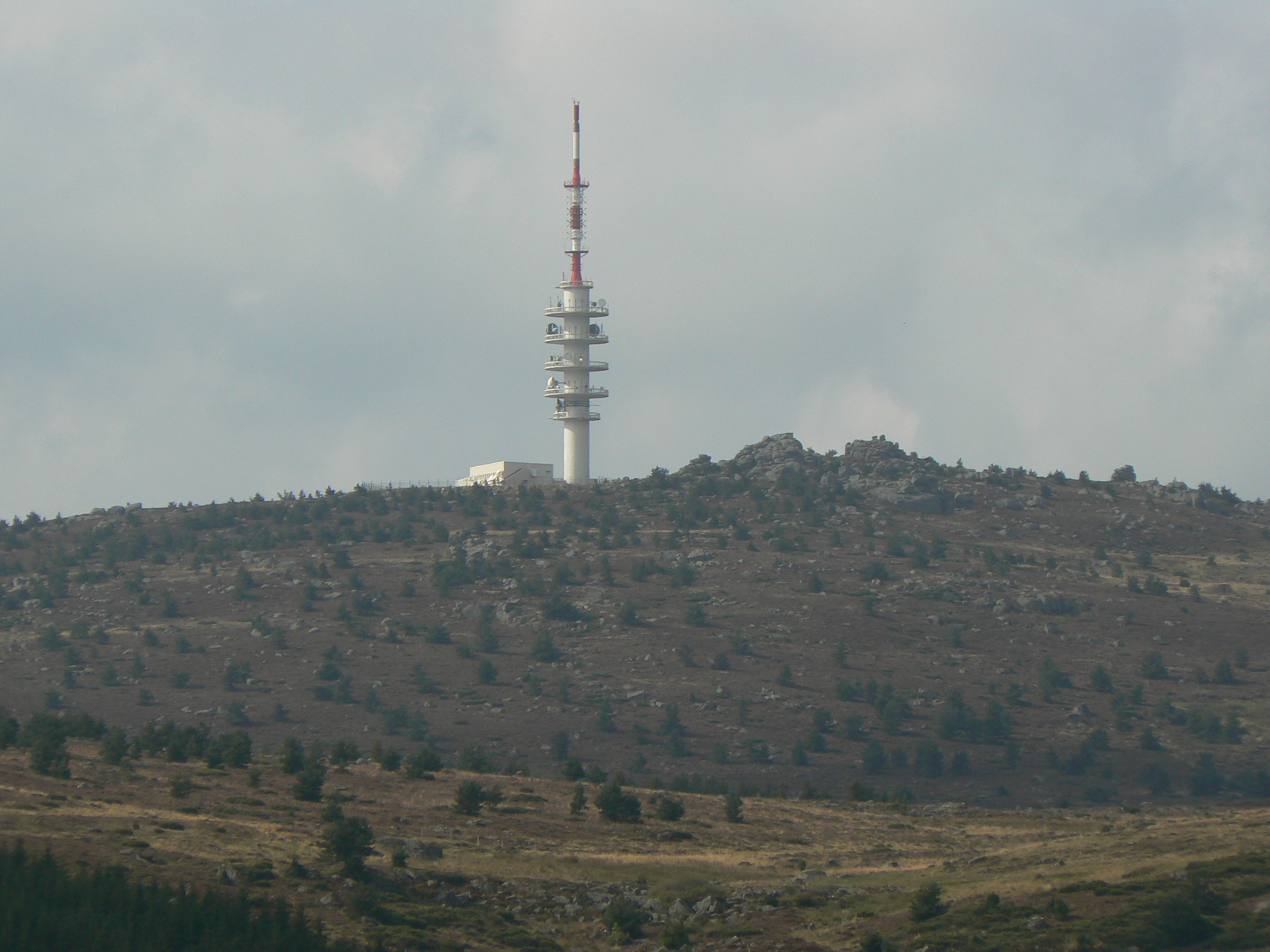
- Fortunio peak and its relay tower.

Highest point
- Elevation: 1,550 m (5,090 ft)
- Coordinates: 44°38′33″N 3°31′58″E

Geography
- Location within France
- Location: Lozère departement, France
- Parent range: Margeride (Massif Central)

The Truc de Fortunio is a summit of the Margeride, a natural region located mainly in Lozère, but also in Cantal and Haute-Loire. It is situated in the Lozère department, in the commune of Rieutort-de-Randon, near the Truc de Randon and the Signal de Randon.

== Geography ==
The Truc de Fortunio is a summit of the Charpal Plateau, classified as a Natura 2000 area. The flora surrounding it consists of European dry heaths (broom), coniferous forests, and nard grass meadows. Peat bogs and granite chaos formations complete the landscape.

== Telecommunications ==
The summit of Truc de Fortunio is equipped with relay antennas for television, public service radios, and mobile telephony to serve the northern Lozère and southern Cantal regions. This relay, utilizing a tower with a height of 105 meters, has been equipped since February 2009 to broadcast TNT.
