= Col de la Baraque des Bouviers =

- Location within France
- Elevation: 1,420 metres (4,660 ft)
- Traversed by: RD 5

Third Approach
- Location: Lozère, France
- Range: Margeride (Massif central)
- Coordinates: 44°45′30″N 3°31′16″E

The Col de la Baraque des Bouviers is a Margeride pass rising to 1420 meters above sea level and located in the northern French department of Lozère, in Occitanie.

== Geography ==
On the edge of the Croix de Bor national forest, the pass is on the D5 departmental road between Laval-Atger and Javols. Due to its altitude, snowfall is frequent and snowdrifts are common. It is also crossed by a long-distance hiking trail 43.

== History ==
The mountain was the setting for maquis camps during the Second World War.

== Activities ==
Les Bouviers Nordic ski area covers 30 kilometres (19 mi) to 50 kilometres (31 mi) of cross-country trails, with 5 tracks including 2 green, 1 blue, 1 red and 1 black. The is also ideal for ski touring and snowshoeing.

== See also ==
- List of ski areas and resorts in Europe
