= Montchauvet (mountain) =

Mountain in France

- Location within France

Highest point
- Elevation: 1,485 m (4,872 ft)
- Coordinates: 44°55′08″N 3°25′22″E

Geography
- Location: Haute-Loire, France
- Parent range: Margeride (Massif Central)

Montchauvet, also known as Mont Chauvet, is a mountain located in the Margeride massif, reaching an altitude of 1,485 meters in the Haute-Loire department. This mountain is notable for having been inhabited since the Neolithic era and during the Middle Ages.

== Toponymy ==
It is known in medieval texts as Monte Calvo, meaning the "bald mountain."

== Geography ==
=== Location ===
It is located in the commune of Saugues, with its southern slope extending into the commune of Grèzes, in the Haute-Loire department.

At its summit, a panorama allows for the observation of the Mézenc massif, the Devès, and the Mounts of Cantal.

=== Biodiversity ===
Encircled by a beech forest, the mountain features heathland with ling heather, blueberries, and raspberries in the summer.

Montchauvet is one of the Natura 2000 sites known as "Sommets et versants orientaux de la Margeride."

== Village of Montchauvet in the Middle Ages ==
The deserted medieval village of Montchauvet, rediscovered since the first archaeological work in 1965, was inhabited between the 10th and 15th centuries. The village, built on the slope of Montchauvet, is surrounded by terraced fields, indicating the expansion of agricultural land. It appears to have not survived the Little Ice Age, the Great Plague, and the Routiers who plundered the strongholds and villages of the Archpriest of Saugues after the Treaty of Brétigny in 1360. This slope of Montchauvet is also home to two other smaller deserted villages.
