= Montagne du Goulet =

Mountain in central France

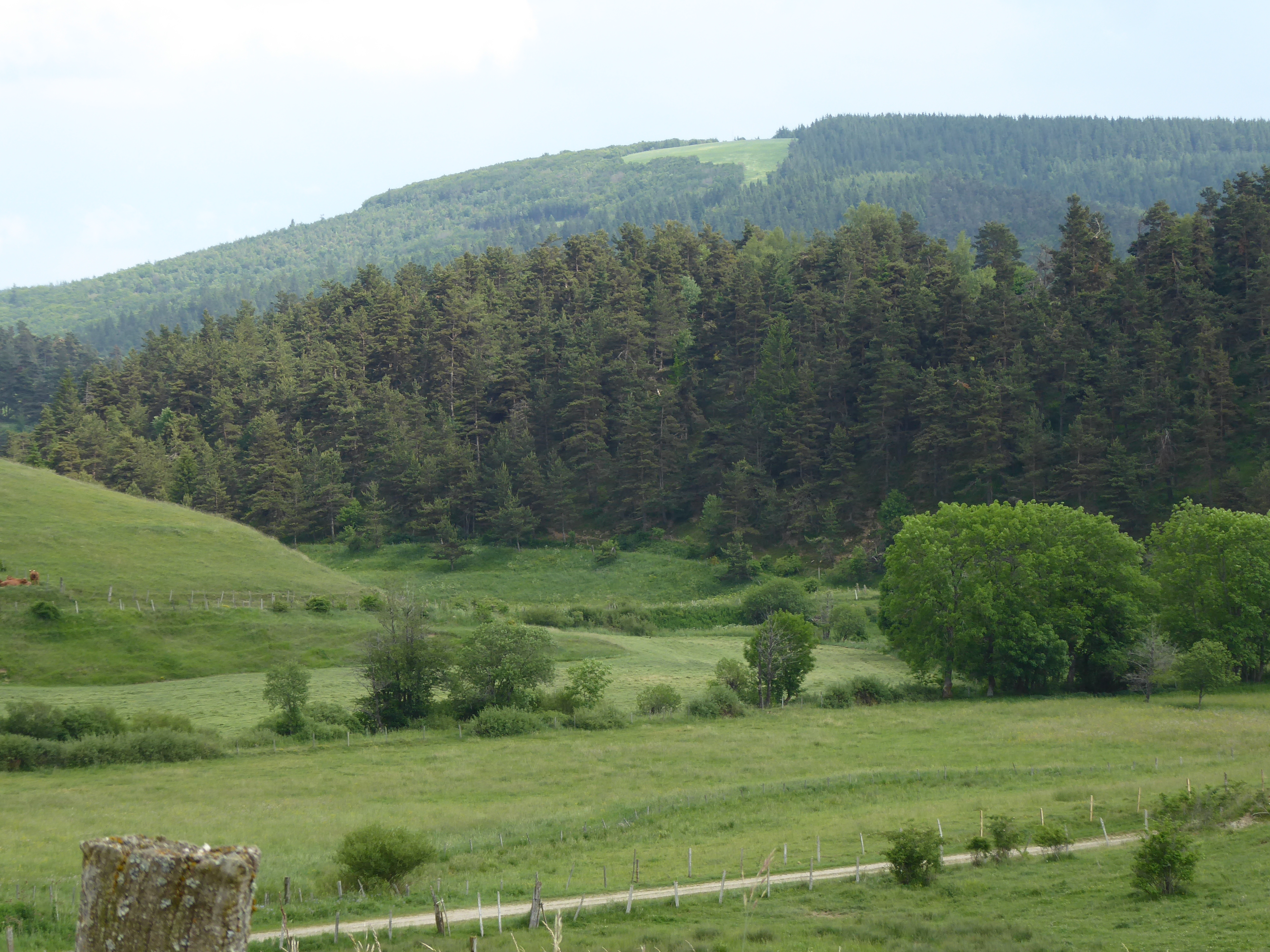
- View of the northern slope of Montagne du Goulet from the vicinity of Belvezet.

Highest point
- Elevation: 1,497 m (4,911 ft)
- Coordinates: 44°39′23″N 3°32′35″E

Geography
- Location within France
- Location: Lozère departement, France
- Parent range: Margeride (Massif Central)

The Montagne du Goulet (Occitan: Montanha del Gargot) is a peak located in the eastern part of the Lozère department, reaching an altitude of 1,497 meters and belonging to the Margeride massif. It is situated at the extreme north of the Cévennes National Park.

== Geography ==
=== Topography ===
Taking the shape of an eroded plateau approximately 20 km long in the west–east direction, and 5 to 6 km wide in the north–south direction, the Goulet forms a ridge strictly parallel to that of Mont Lozère (1,699 m) to the south and that of Moure de la Gardille (1,503 m) to the north.

=== Hydrology ===
Many rivers have their source (including the Lot) on the mountain. It is located on the watershed between the Atlantic and the Mediterranean.

=== Geology ===
The Montagne du Goulet is geologically linked to the southern Cévennes. It is formed of shale, and a large fault to the north, oriented east–west, separates it from Triassic and Jurassic transgressive sedimentary formations that overlay the crystalline basement, which extends further north into the Ardèche Cévennes.

=== Climate ===
Forming a barrier to the east of the Massif Central, in close proximity to the Ardèche, the Goulet receives abundant precipitation (approximately 1,100 to 1,500 mm per year) throughout the year.

=== Fauna and Flora ===
The mountain has been heavily forested since the early 20th century, mainly with conifers (spruce and fir).
