= Saint-Privat-du-Fau =

- Commune
- Location of Saint-Privat-du-Fau
- Location within France Location within Occitanie
- Coordinates: 44°55′04″N 3°20′27″E
- Country: France
- Region: Occitania
- Department: Lozère
- Arrondissement: Mende
- Canton: Saint-Alban-sur-Limagnole
- Intercommunality: Terres d'Apcher-Margeride-Aubrac

Government
  - Mayor (2020–2026): Jean-Claude Laurent
- Area^{1}: 22.16 km^{2} (8.56 sq mi)
- Elevation: 1,100 m (3,600 ft)
- Highest elevation: 1,417 m (4,649 ft)
- Lowest elevation: 879 m (2,884 ft)
- Population (2023): 115
  - Density: 5.19/km^{2} (13.4/sq mi)
- Time zone: UTC+01:00 (CET)
  - Summer (DST): UTC+02:00 (CEST)
- INSEE/Postal code: 48179 /48140
- ^{1} French Land Register data, which excludes lakes, ponds, glaciers > 1 km^{2} (0.386 sq mi or 247 acres) and river estuaries.

Saint-Privat-du-Fau (French pronunciation: [sɛ̃ pʁiva dy fo]; Occitan: Sent Privat del Fau) is a commune in the Lozère department in southern France.

== Notable people ==
- Augustin Trébuchon (30 May 1878 – 11 November 1918) was the last French soldier killed during the First World War. He was a shepherd in Saint-Privat-du-Fau when he was mobilised in 1914.

== See also ==
- Communes of the Lozère department
