= Margeride =

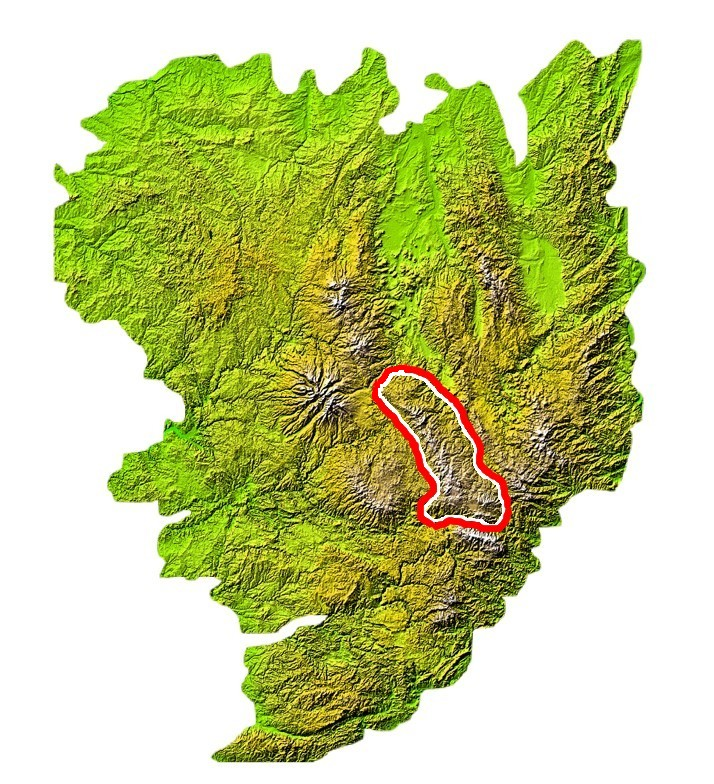
- Map showing the location of the Margeride in the Massif Central.

Highest point
- Elevation: 1,551 m (5,089 ft) at Signal de Randon
- Coordinates: 44.656296°N 3.54374°E

Geography
- Location: Auvergne-Rhône-Alpes, Occitanie, France
- Parent range: Massif Central

Margeride (French pronunciation: [maʁʒəʁid]; in Auvergnat Marjarida) is a mountainous region of France, situated in the Massif Central, inside the départements of Cantal, Haute-Loire and Lozère.

== Toponymy ==
Originally, the name "Margeride" applied only to a seigneury whose castle was ruined in the 15th century and a forest culminating at 1,380 meters (4,530 ft) altitude. Its current name is thought to derive from the Gallic word morgarita, composed of morga meaning "ford, boundary" and -ritu for "ford".

In Occitan, Margeride is called Marjarida.

== Geography ==
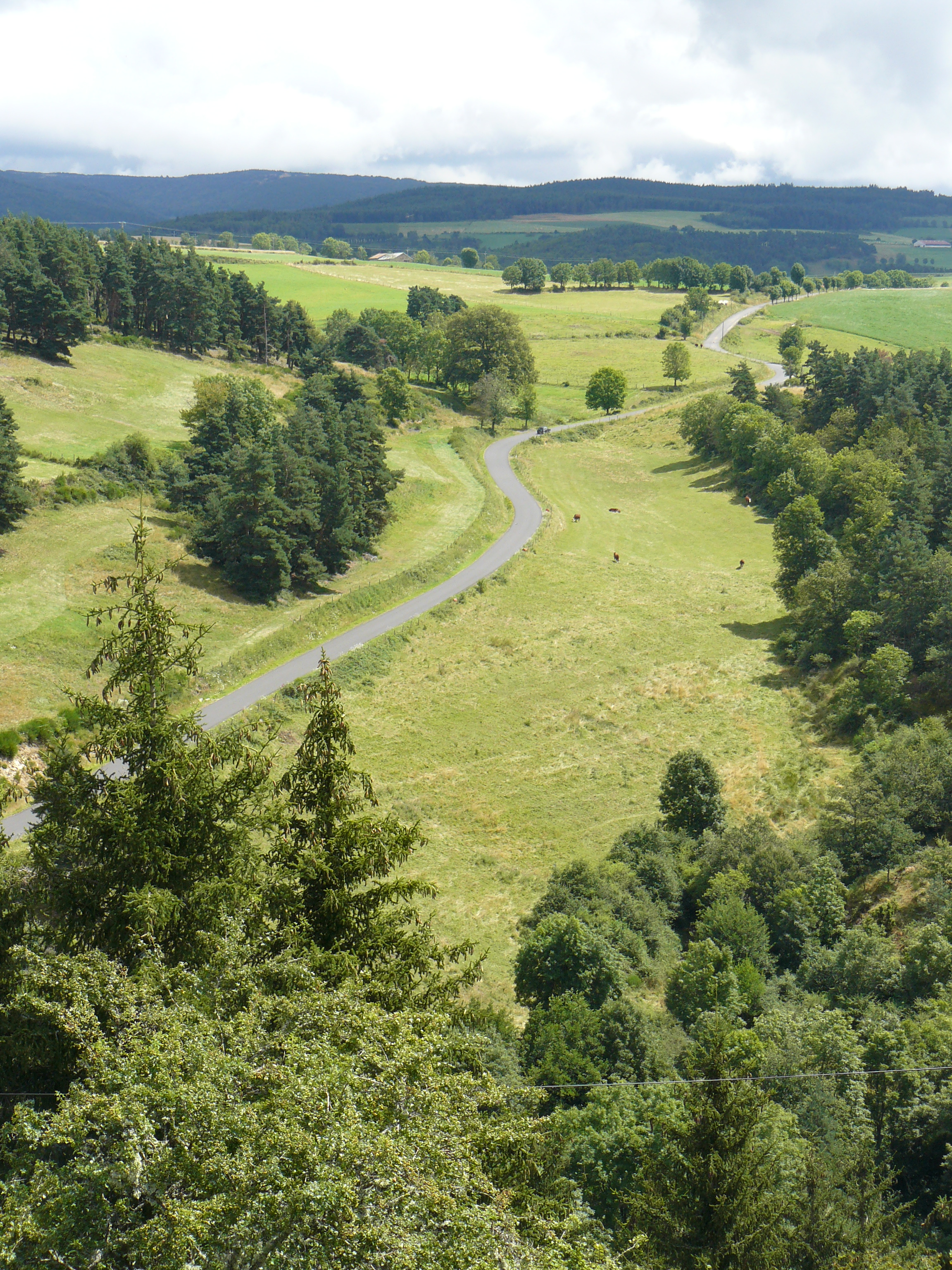
View from Ruynes-en-Margeride.

In Cantal, its western boundary is the Truyère, and its eastern boundary, in Haute-Loire, by the gorges of the river Allier. To the south, in Lozère, It is the Lot which delimits the region.

=== Geology ===
The lithology of area is manly granitoids and gneiss. The highest peaks are the Signal de Randon at 1,551 metres and the Mont Mouchet at 1,465 metres.

=== Hydrography ===
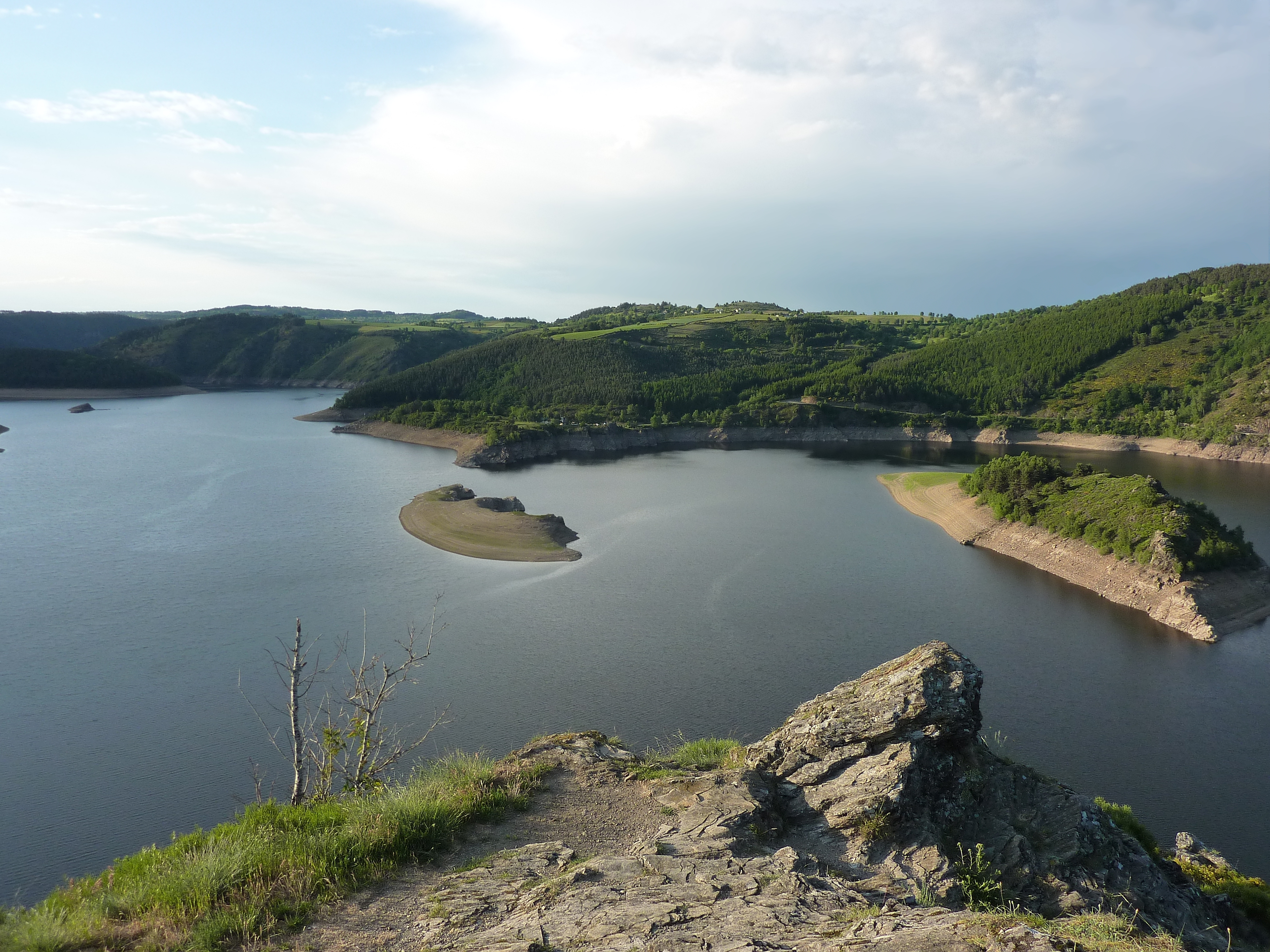
Truyère river.

The watershed separating the Garonne basin and the Loire basin crosses the Margeride. The tributaries of the Allier and the Alagnon belong to the Loire basin, while the tributaries of the Truyère and the Lot belong to that of the Garonne.

=== Mountains ===
The highest mountains and peaks of the Margeride are:

- Signal de Randon, 1,551 m (5,089 ft)
- Truc de Fortunio, 1,550 m (5,090 ft)
- Moure de la Gardille, 1,503 m (4,931 ft)
- Mont Mouchet, 1,497 m (4,911 ft)
- Montagne du Goulet, 1,497 m (4,911 ft)
- Roc de Fenestre, 1,489 m (4,885 ft)
- Puech David, 1,487 m (4,879 ft)
- Peyre Plantade, 1,486 m (4,875 ft)
- Truc de la Garde, 1,486 m (4,875 ft)
- Montchauvet, 1,485 m (4,872 ft)
- Bec Signal, 1,483 m (4,865 ft)
- Ranc de la Licheyre, 1,447 m (4,747 ft)
- Montagne des Ducs, 1,447 m (4,747 ft)
- Truc du Chapelat, 1,442 m (4,731 ft)
- Serre Haut, 1,431 m (4,695 ft)
- Mont Grand, 1,417 m (4,649 ft)
- Truc de Randon, 1,402 m (4,600 ft)
- Timoneire, 1,401 m (4,596 ft)
- Le Bessal, 1,397 m (4,583 ft)
- Puech Pauliac, 1,395 m (4,577 ft)
- Truc de Montchabrier, 1,395 m (4,577 ft)
- Signal de Margeride, 1,381 m (4,531 ft)

=== Climate ===
The climate is cold but relatively dry; the Mounts of Cantal and Aubrac block precipitation coming from the west and provide Margeride with a relatively sheltered position. However, it remains harsh with a long period of snow cover and exhibits thermal characteristics similar to the climates of Iceland or Sweden. The winds can be very strong and regularly sweep the ridges and plateaus. In winter, temperatures are comparable to those found in the Jura: for example, temperatures almost reached -30°C on March 1, 2005, in Saugues at only 900 meters above sea level.

=== Fauna and Flora ===
With diverse fauna and habitats, the Margeride is home to numerous mammal species such as hares, foxes, badgers, wild boars, as well as deer and roe deer. The lakes and rivers in the northern part of Lozère also provide a habitat for trout. The otter can be found along the banks of the Truyère.

Along the banks of certain streams, the tufted loosestrife (Lysimachia thyrsiflora), a plant native to central and boreal Europe, rare in France, grows. The vast peat bogs of Margeride harbor a flora typical of cold environments, almost unique in France, including species relics of the glaciations such as the rare dwarf birch (Betula nana) or the downy willow (Salix lapponum). One of the most interesting peat bogs is that of Lajo, not far from Saint-Alban-sur-Limagnole.

== History ==
The area was a stronghold of the French Resistance in the Second World War. It was from here that the Resistance worked to delay German reinforcements travelling north after the D-Day landings.

Today the area contains a museum of ecology, and a park with a herd of rare European bison.

== Tourism ==
Summer hiking is a great way to discover the massif. There are numerous trails, regularly signposted, and signs regularly indicating the time needed to cover the marked paths. Margeride is also a great place for mountain biking. Numerous cross-country and enduro trails have been mapped out, suitable for all levels.

A "Trail Margeride" area lets you discover part of the massif from Le Malzieu.

In winter, cross-country skiing is possible on the trails of the Bouviers and Laubert-Plateau du Roy ski resorts.
