= Mouchel (surname) =

Mouchel is a surname, likely of French origin. Notable people with the surname include:

- Jean Mouchel (1928–2022), French politician, novelist, and farmer
- Louis Gustave Mouchel (1852–1908), French businessman
- Marcel Mouchel (1927–2012), French footballer and manager

== See also ==
- Mouchel, a former infrastructure and business services company headquartered in Woking, United Kingdom
- Mouchet
