= Maquis du Mont Mouchet =

French resistance fighters during the Second World War

Battle of Mont Mouchet
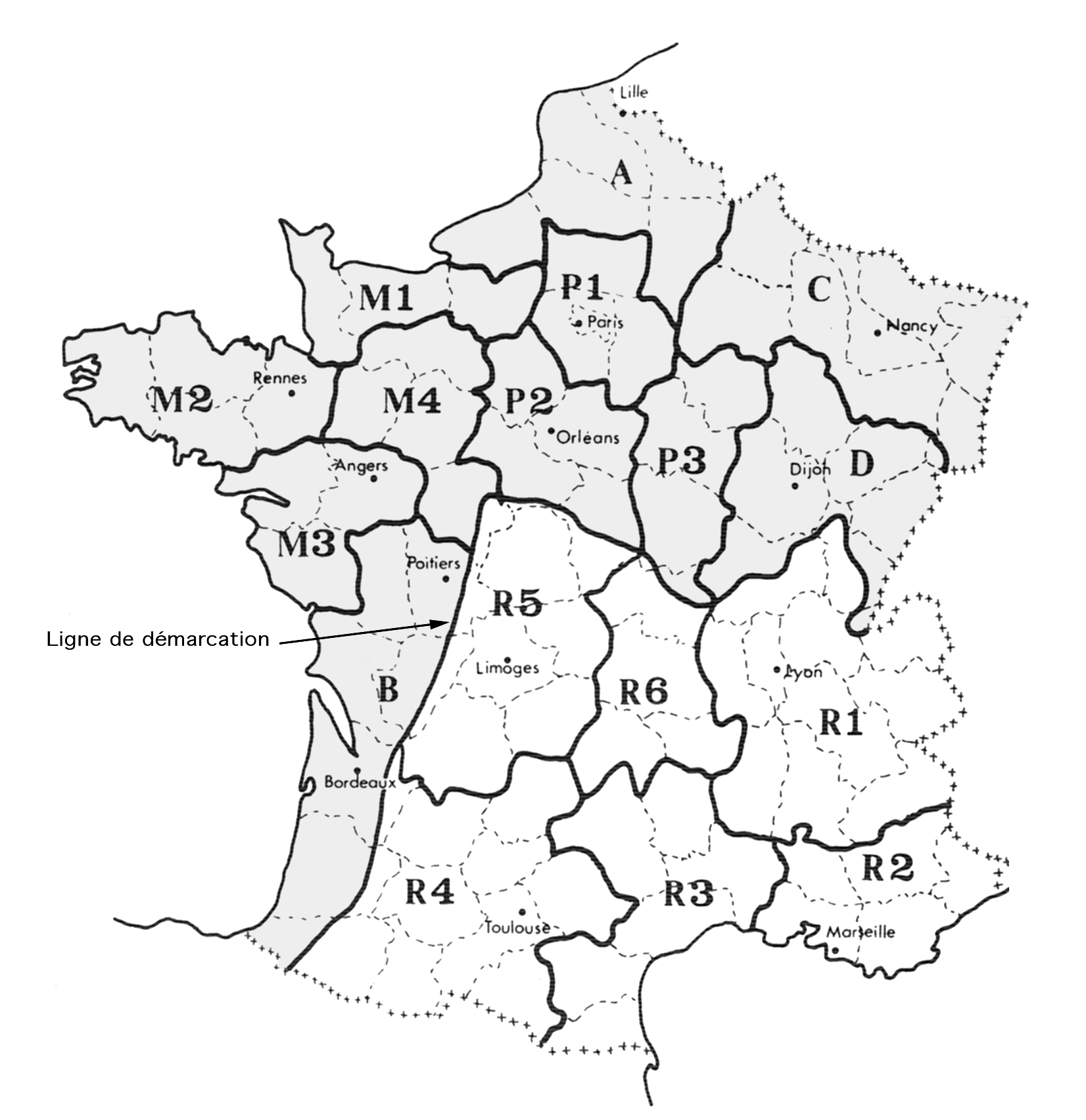
- Geographic organization of the French Resistance. Mont Mouchet is on the border of R6 and R3
Date	May 1944 – June 1944
Location	Mont Mouchet, France 44.9756°N 3.3728°E
Result	German victory

Belligerents
(Free France) French Resistance	Germany; Vichy France: Milice

Commanders and leaders
(Free France) Émile Coulaudon	(Nazi Germany) Curt von Jesser

Strength
2,700 maquisards	3,000 German soldiers; unknown number of policemen and Milice Franc-Gardes

Casualties and losses
238 dead 180 wounded	Unknown
- 100 civilians executed by the Germans

The Maquis du Mont Mouchet (French pronunciation: [maki dy mɔ̃ mu ʃɛ]) were a group of French resistance fighters during the Second World War that were based at Mont Mouchet.

The Germans, having discovered the maquis, made several attacks up until May 1944 with about 3,000 men and using aviation and armoured units. The maquisards fought back fiercely.

Little information is available on the German forces. Historians have identified some units:

- The Jesser Brigade, formed from veterans of the eastern front (deployed in the Orléans-Pithiviers sector)
- Sicherungs-Regiment 1000
- Aufklärungsabteilung 1000

These were reinforced from:

- Regiment 2 of the 2 Ost-Bataillone of the Freiwilligen-Stamm-Division:
  - The Volga Tatar legion stationed at Puy-en-Velay
  - The Azerbaijan legion stationed at Rodez (former 804th battalion ?)
- The 3rd Battalion of the SS Polizei Regiment 19
- A battery of the artillery regiment 28 (189th reserve division)
- Battalion of DCA 958
- 3 motorised response detachments of the Feldgendarmerie
- An armored reconnaissance platoon originating from Paris
- 2 Luftwaffe squadrons from Aulnat airbase

After several days of combat, the final German attack forced the maquisards to fall back and disperse. Out of revenge for their previous losses, the Germans pillaged several of the surrounding villages, including Clavières.

In the course of the battles, the French Forces of the Interior sustained severe losses: 238 killed and 180 wounded as well as about 100 hostages executed by the Nazis.

== Sources ==
- (in French) Mémoire de la France
