= Saint-Léger-du-Malzieu =

- Commune
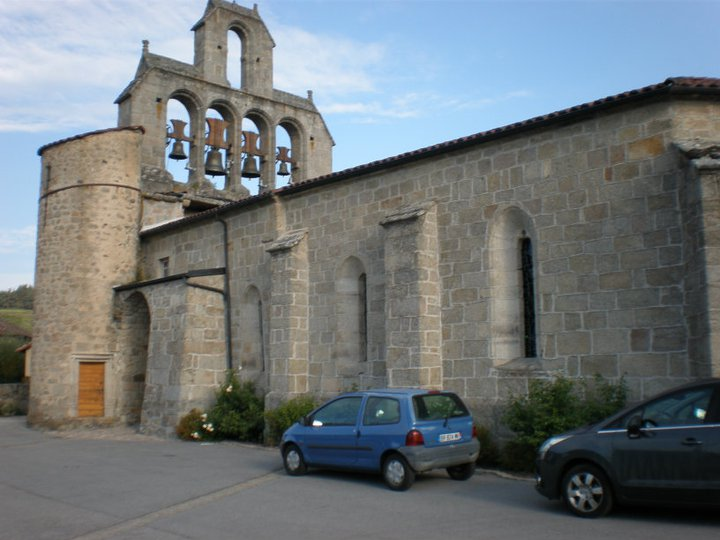
- The church of Saint-Barthélémy, in Saint-Léger-du-Malzieu
- Location of Saint-Léger-du-Malzieu
- Location within France Location within Occitanie
- Coordinates: 44°53′19″N 3°18′38″E
- Country: France
- Region: Occitania
- Department: Lozère
- Arrondissement: Mende
- Canton: Saint-Alban-sur-Limagnole
- Intercommunality: Terres d'Apcher-Margeride-Aubrac

Government
  - Mayor (2020–2026): Ludovic Jaffuel
- Area^{1}: 18.92 km^{2} (7.31 sq mi)
- Elevation: 859 m (2,818 ft)
- Highest elevation: 1,184 m (3,885 ft)
- Lowest elevation: 797 m (2,615 ft)
- Population (2023): 212
  - Density: 11.2/km^{2} (29.0/sq mi)
- Time zone: UTC+01:00 (CET)
  - Summer (DST): UTC+02:00 (CEST)
- INSEE/Postal code: 48169 /48140
- ^{1} French Land Register data, which excludes lakes, ponds, glaciers > 1 km^{2} (0.386 sq mi or 247 acres) and river estuaries.

Saint-Léger-du-Malzieu (French pronunciation: [sɛ̃ leʒe dy malzjø]; Auvergnat: Sent Latgièr del Malasiu) is a commune in the Lozère department in southern France.

== Demography ==
Historical population
Year	Pop.	±% p.a.
1968	330	—
1975	283	−2.17%
1982	263	−1.04%
1990	235	−1.40%
1999	189	−2.39%
2007	212	+1.45%
2012	200	−1.16%
2017	215	+1.46%
2023	212	−0.23%
Source: INSEE

== See also ==
- Communes of the Lozère department
