= Grèzes, Haute-Loire =

Grèzes
- Commune
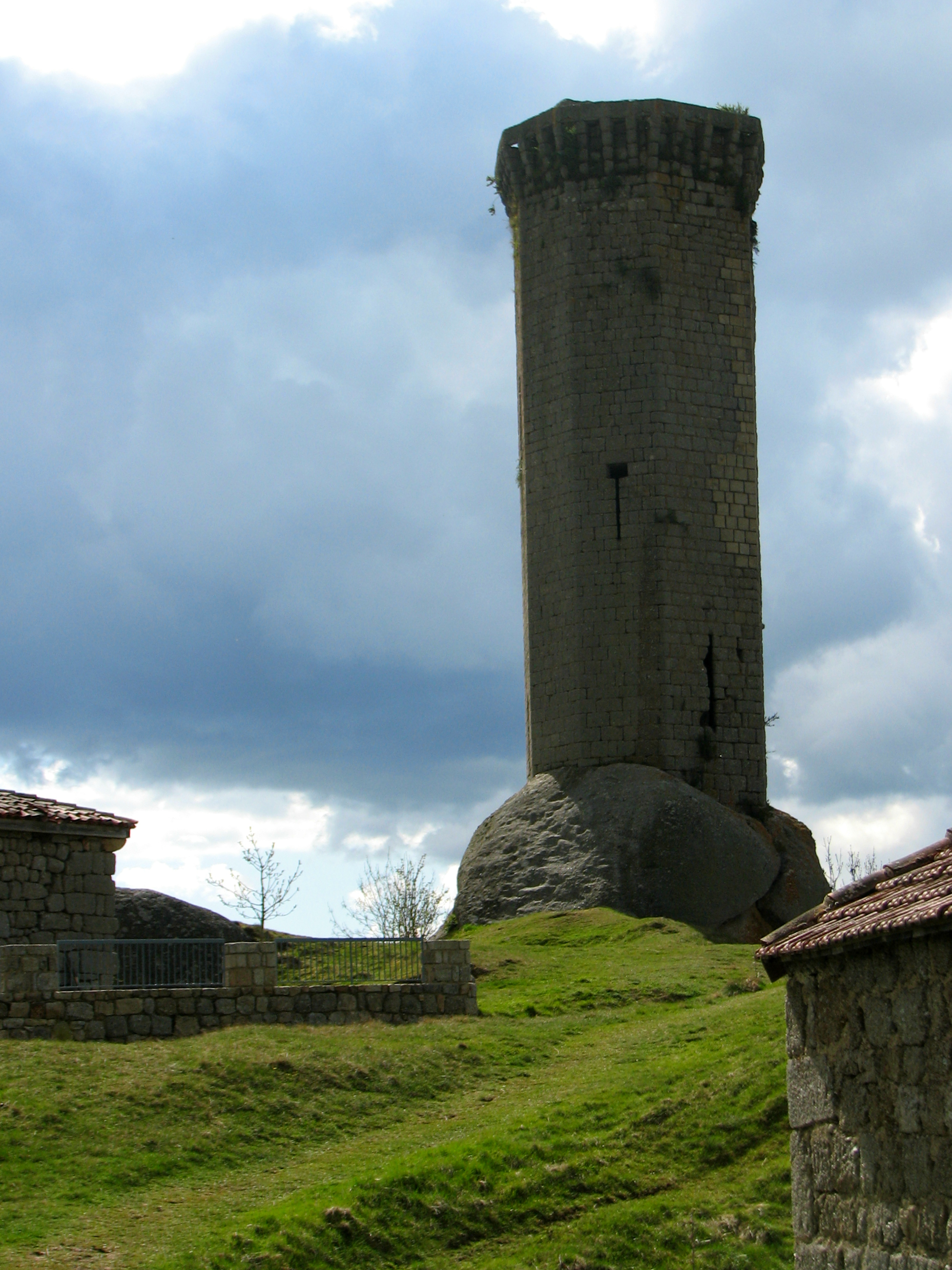
- Tour de la Clauze
- Location of Grèzes
- Location within France Location within Auvergne-Rhône-Alpes
- Coordinates: 44°55′14″N 3°29′16″E
- Country: France
- Region: Auvergne-Rhône-Alpes
- Department: Haute-Loire
- Arrondissement: Brioude
- Canton: Gorges de l'Allier-Gévaudan

Government
  - Mayor (2020–2026): Claude Ginhac
- Area^{1}: 35.79 km^{2} (13.82 sq mi)
- Elevation: 1,065 m (3,494 ft)
- Highest elevation: 1,484 m (4,869 ft)
- Lowest elevation: 1,017 m (3,337 ft)
- Population (2023): 182
  - Density: 5.09/km^{2} (13.2/sq mi)
- Time zone: UTC+01:00 (CET)
  - Summer (DST): UTC+02:00 (CEST)
- INSEE/Postal code: 43104 /43170
- ^{1} French Land Register data, which excludes lakes, ponds, glaciers > 1 km^{2} (0.386 sq mi or 247 acres) and river estuaries.

Grèzes (French pronunciation: [ɡʁɛz]; Occitan: Gresas) is a commune in the Haute-Loire department in south-central France.

== Population ==
Historical population
Year	Pop.	±% p.a.
1968	451	—
1975	391	−2.02%
1982	365	−0.98%
1990	316	−1.79%
1999	257	−2.27%
2007	221	−1.87%
2012	207	−1.30%
2017	198	−0.89%
2023	182	−1.39%
Source: INSEE

== See also ==
- Communes of the Haute-Loire department
- Henri de Grèzes
