= Mont Mouchet =

Mountain in France

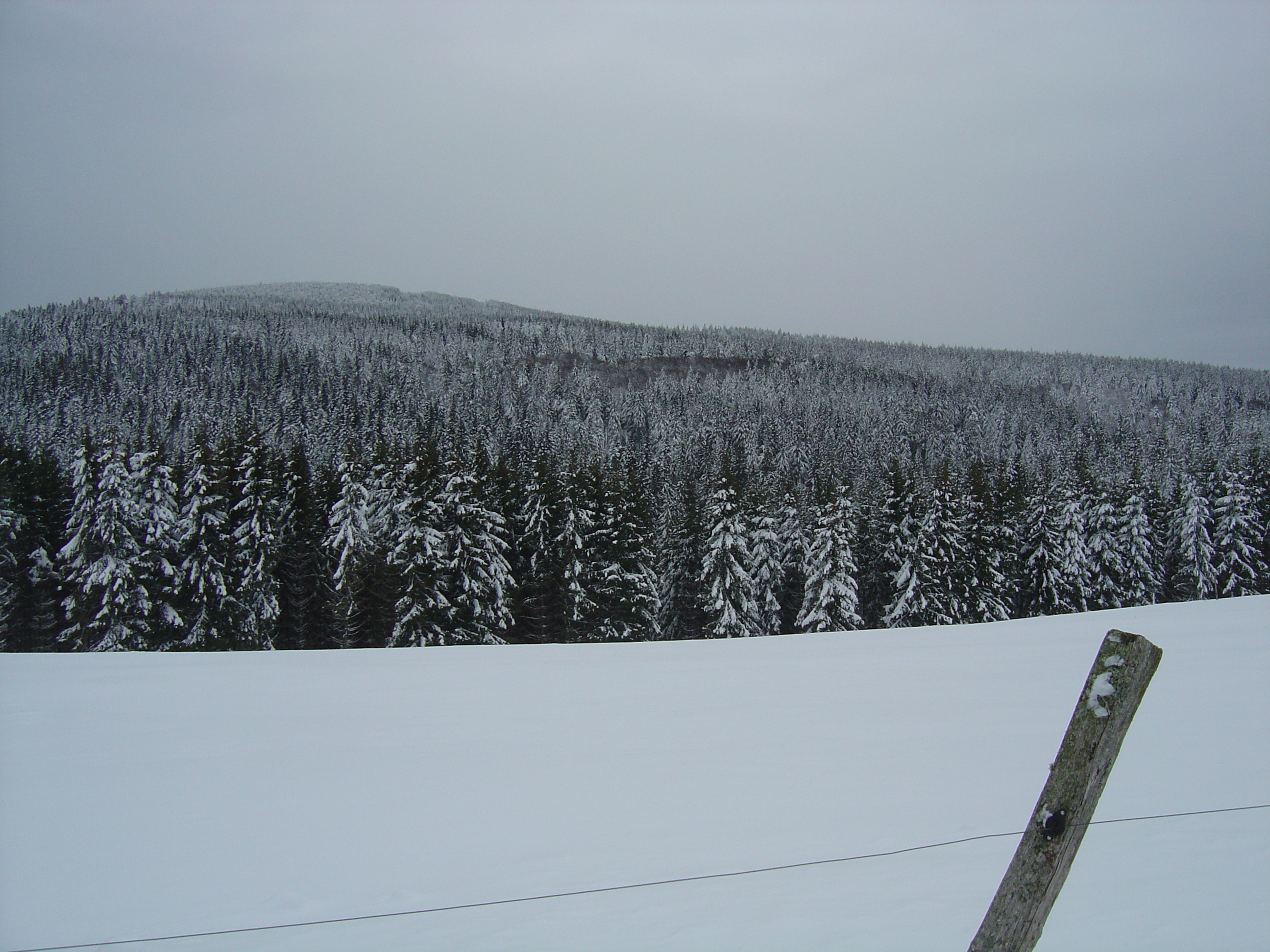

Highest point
- Elevation: 1,497 m (4,911 ft)
- Coordinates: 44°58′32″N 3°22′22″E

Geography
- Location within France
- Location: Haute-Loire - Lozère, France
- Parent range: Margeride (Massif Central)

Mont Mouchet (French pronunciation: [mɔ̃ muʃɛ]) is a 1,497-metre-high (4,911 ft) mountain located on the border of the French départements of Cantal, Haute-Loire and Lozère. It is famous for the historical events which took place there, notably during the Second World War where it hosted a group of French resistance fighters, the Maquis du Mont Mouchet. At the summit there is a large cairn and view-point (about 3 metres high) from which there is a splendid panoramic view over much of Central France from the Massif Central to the Alps.

== The beast of Gévaudan ==
On the 19 June 1767, Jean Chastel, accompanied only by his two sons, left to track down the Beast of Gévaudan in the forest of Mont Mouchet. According to Chastel's description, the beast would emerge from the woods onto the track, and sit on its haunches in fright, awaiting an inescapable death.

== The beast and the World War II resistance ==
In June 1944, Mont Mouchet was the scene of the Battle of Mont Mouchet, which pitted the Wehrmacht against the French Resistance.

Mont Mouchet has been visited by several French presidents: General de Gaulle, on June 5, 1959; Valéry Giscard d'Estaing, on June 23, 1974; François Mitterrand, on July 5, 1981; François Hollande, on July 6, 2014.

== Tourist locations ==
- Near to the summit of Mont Mouchet in the commune of Auvers, is a memorial to the resistance alongside a museum of the Haut Gévaudan maquisards.

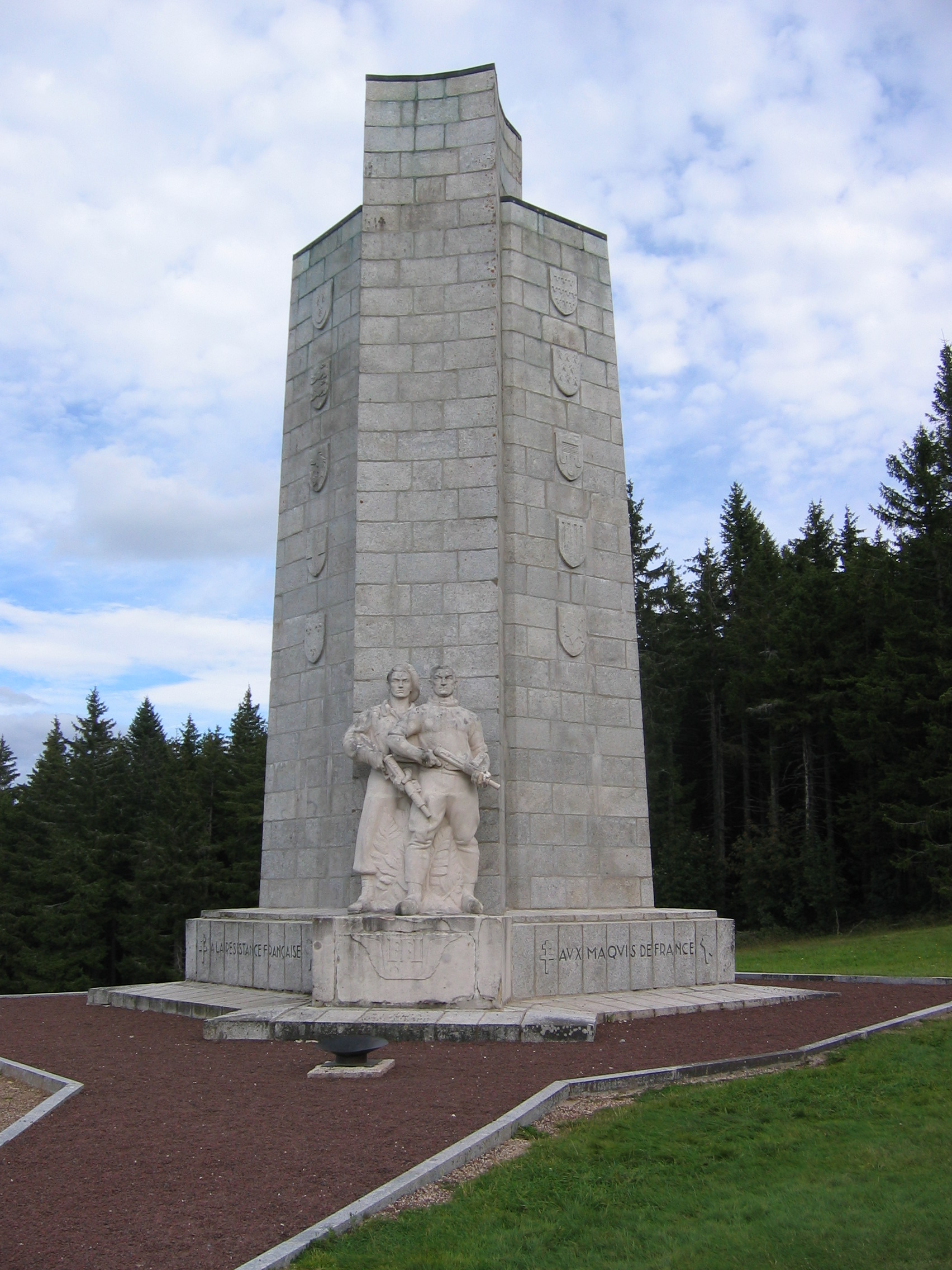
Memorial to the resistance.

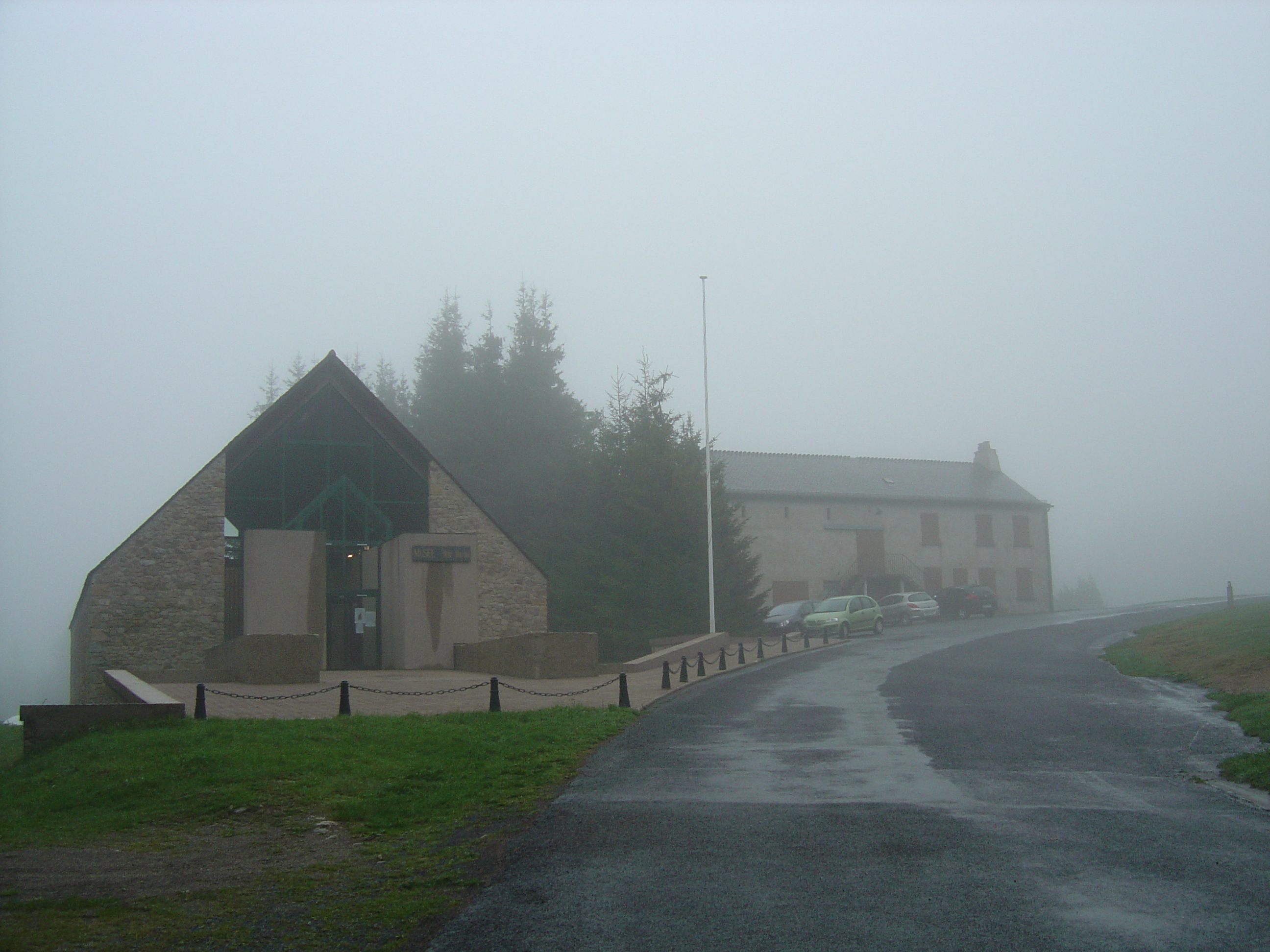
Museum of the resistance.

== Quotes ==
What took place here was an episode, not as well known as it should be, and very heroic, of the French resistance. I have kept coming to pay homage to the memory of those who fell in battle at this high place in our fatherland, and to salute the former soldiers who fought here under the command of Colonel Gaspard.

General Charles de Gaulle, 5 June 1955

== See also ==
- Margeride
- Beast of Gévaudan
