= Le Malzieu-Forain =

- Commune
- Location of Le Malzieu-Forain
- Location within France Location within Occitanie
- Coordinates: 44°51′19″N 3°19′45″E
- Country: France
- Region: Occitania
- Department: Lozère
- Arrondissement: Mende
- Canton: Saint-Alban-sur-Limagnole
- Intercommunality: Terres d'Apcher-Margeride-Aubrac

Government
  - Mayor (2020–2026): Colette Rouquet
- Area^{1}: 48.65 km^{2} (18.78 sq mi)
- Elevation: 1,200 m (3,900 ft)
- Highest elevation: 1,486 m (4,875 ft)
- Lowest elevation: 855 m (2,805 ft)
- Population (2023): 484
  - Density: 9.95/km^{2} (25.8/sq mi)
- Time zone: UTC+01:00 (CET)
  - Summer (DST): UTC+02:00 (CEST)
- INSEE/Postal code: 48089 /48140
- ^{1} French Land Register data, which excludes lakes, ponds, glaciers > 1 km^{2} (0.386 sq mi or 247 acres) and river estuaries.

Le Malzieu-Forain (French pronunciation: [lə malzjø fɔʁɛ̃]; Occitan: Lo Malasiu Foran) is a commune in the Lozère department in southern France.

== Demography ==
Historical population
Year	Pop.	±% p.a.
1968	533	—
1975	477	−1.57%
1982	379	−3.23%
1990	354	−0.85%
1999	357	+0.09%
2007	447	+2.85%
2012	462	+0.66%
2017	476	+0.60%
2023	484	+0.28%
Source: INSEE

== See also ==
- Communes of the Lozère department
