= Esplantas =

Commune in Haute-Loire, France

- Part of Esplantas-Vazeilles
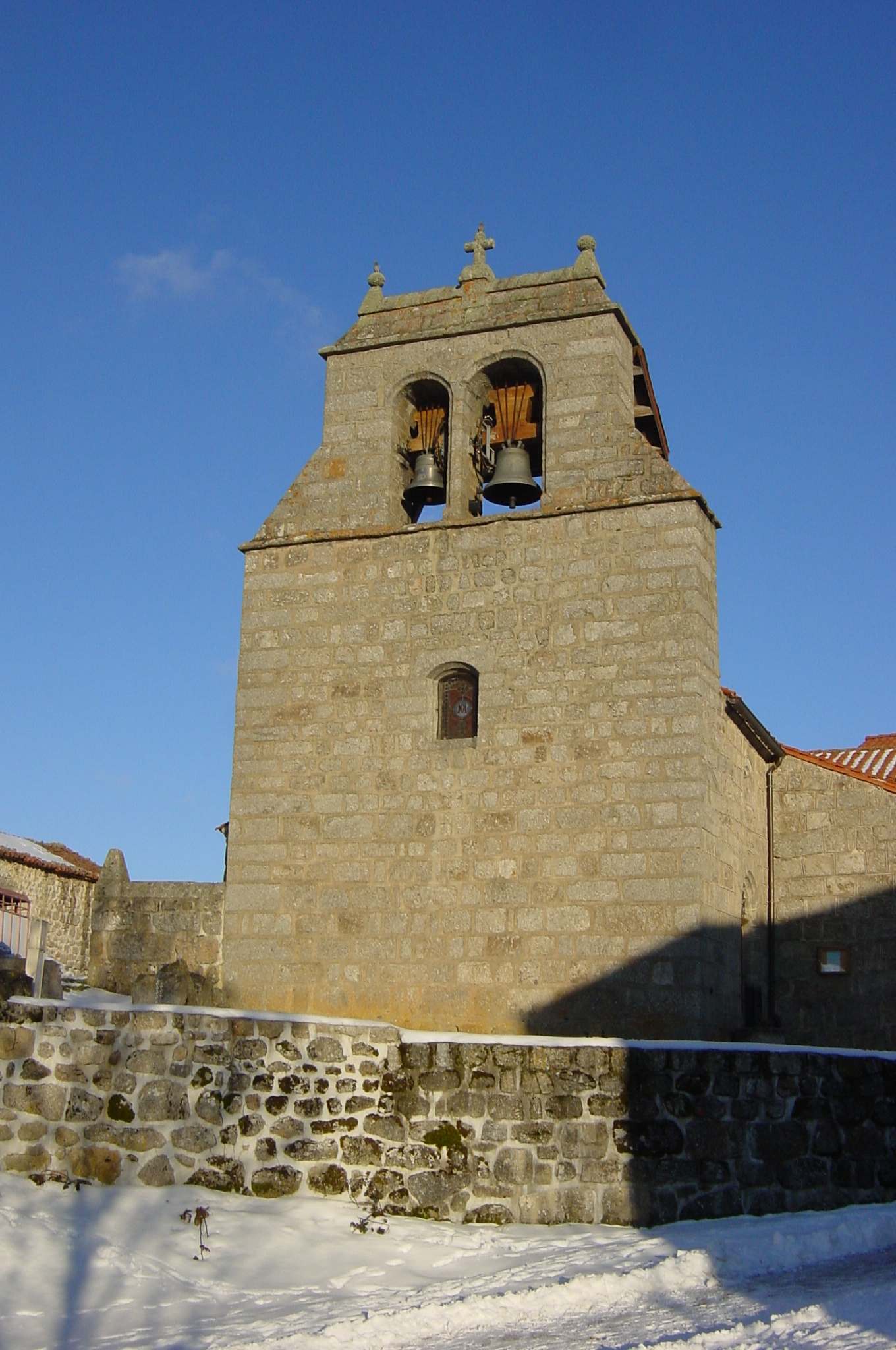
- The bell tower in Esplantas
- Location of Esplantas
- Location within France Location within Auvergne-Rhône-Alpes
- Coordinates: 44°54′37″N 3°32′51″E
- Country: France
- Region: Auvergne-Rhône-Alpes
- Department: Haute-Loire
- Arrondissement: Brioude
- Canton: Gorges de l'Allier-Gévaudan
- Commune: Esplantas-Vazeilles
- Area^{1}: 10.4 km^{2} (4.0 sq mi)
- Elevation: 1,063 m (3,488 ft)
- Highest elevation: 1,142 m (3,747 ft)
- Lowest elevation: 962 m (3,156 ft)
- Population (2013): 98
  - Density: 9.4/km^{2} (24/sq mi)
- Time zone: UTC+01:00 (CET)
  - Summer (DST): UTC+02:00 (CEST)
- Postal code: 43170
- ^{1} French Land Register data, which excludes lakes, ponds, glaciers > 1 km^{2} (0.386 sq mi or 247 acres) and river estuaries.

Esplantas (Auvergnat: Esplantats) is a former commune in the Haute-Loire department in south-central France. On 1 January 2016, it was merged into the new commune Esplantas-Vazeilles.

== See also ==
- Communes of the Haute-Loire department
