= Vazeilles-près-Saugues =

- Part of Esplantas-Vazeilles
- Location of Vazeilles-près-Saugues
- Location within France Location within Auvergne-Rhône-Alpes
- Coordinates: 44°53′56″N 3°35′20″E
- Country: France
- Region: Auvergne-Rhône-Alpes
- Department: Haute-Loire
- Arrondissement: Brioude
- Canton: Gorges de l'Allier-Gévaudan
- Commune: Esplantas-Vazeilles
- Area^{1}: 6.73 km^{2} (2.60 sq mi)
- Elevation: 109 m (358 ft)
- Highest elevation: 1,154 m (3,786 ft)
- Lowest elevation: 894 m (2,933 ft)
- Population (2022): 35
  - Density: 5.2/km^{2} (13/sq mi)
- Time zone: UTC+01:00 (CET)
  - Summer (DST): UTC+02:00 (CEST)
- Postal code: 43580
- ^{1} French Land Register data, which excludes lakes, ponds, glaciers > 1 km^{2} (0.386 sq mi or 247 acres) and river estuaries.

Vazeilles-près-Saugues (Auvergnat: Vaselhas) is a former commune in the Haute-Loire department in south-central France. On 1 January 2016, it was merged into the new commune Esplantas-Vazeilles. Its population was 35 in 2022.

== See also ==
- Communes of the Haute-Loire department
