= Saint-Préjet-d'Allier =

- Commune
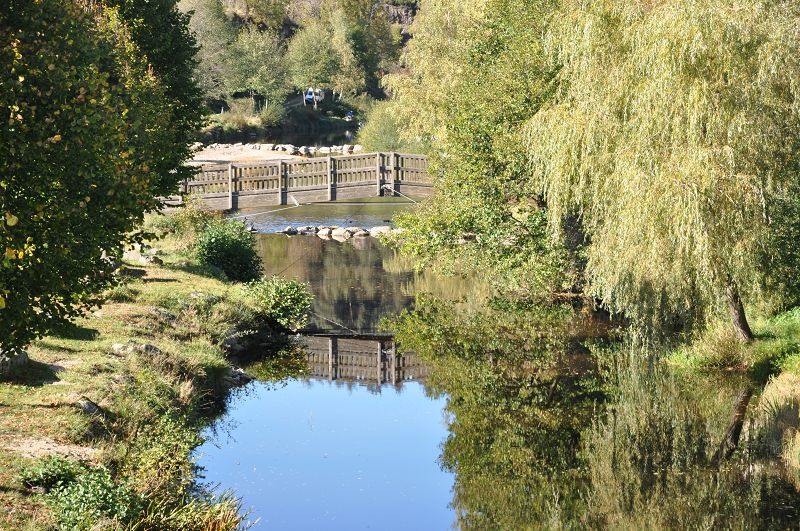
- The Ance du Sud

- Coat of arms
- Location of Saint-Préjet-d'Allier
- Location within France Location within Auvergne-Rhône-Alpes
- Coordinates: 44°54′58″N 3°37′23″E
- Country: France
- Region: Auvergne-Rhône-Alpes
- Department: Haute-Loire
- Arrondissement: Brioude
- Canton: Gorges de l'Allier-Gévaudan
- Intercommunality: CA du Puy-en-Velay

Government
  - Mayor (2020–2026): Jean-Claude Morel
- Area^{1}: 24.46 km^{2} (9.44 sq mi)
- Elevation: 850 m (2,790 ft)
- Highest elevation: 1,135 m (3,724 ft)
- Lowest elevation: 711 m (2,333 ft)
- Population (2023): 159
  - Density: 6.50/km^{2} (16.8/sq mi)
- Time zone: UTC+01:00 (CET)
  - Summer (DST): UTC+02:00 (CEST)
- INSEE/Postal code: 43220 /43580
- ^{1} French Land Register data, which excludes lakes, ponds, glaciers > 1 km^{2} (0.386 sq mi or 247 acres) and river estuaries.

Saint-Préjet-d'Allier (French pronunciation: [sɛ̃ pʁeʒɛ dalje], literally Saint-Préjet of Allier; Occitan: Sant Prejet d'Alèir) is a commune in the Haute-Loire department in south-central France.

== Geography ==
The town is 35 km (22 mi) west of Le Puy-en-Velay.

== Population ==
Historical population
Year	Pop.	±% p.a.
1968	364	—
1975	303	−2.59%
1982	268	−1.74%
1990	224	−2.22%
1999	199	−1.31%
2007	176	−1.52%
2012	164	−1.40%
2017	165	+0.12%
2023	159	−0.62%
Source: INSEE

== See also ==
- Communes of the Haute-Loire department
