= Chazelles, Haute-Loire =

Chazelles
- Commune
- Location of Chazelles
- Location within France Location within Auvergne-Rhône-Alpes
- Coordinates: 45°01′13″N 3°29′20″E
- Country: France
- Region: Auvergne-Rhône-Alpes
- Department: Haute-Loire
- Arrondissement: Brioude
- Canton: Gorges de l'Allier-Gévaudan

Government
  - Mayor (2020–2026): Bernard Vissac
- Area^{1}: 4.9 km^{2} (1.9 sq mi)
- Elevation: 650 m (2,130 ft)
- Highest elevation: 1,013 m (3,323 ft)
- Lowest elevation: 626 m (2,054 ft)
- Population (2023): 32
  - Density: 6.5/km^{2} (17/sq mi)
- Time zone: UTC+01:00 (CET)
  - Summer (DST): UTC+02:00 (CEST)
- INSEE/Postal code: 43068 /43300
- ^{1} French Land Register data, which excludes lakes, ponds, glaciers > 1 km^{2} (0.386 sq mi or 247 acres) and river estuaries.

Chazelles (French pronunciation: [ʃazɛl]; Occitan: Chaselas) is a commune in the Haute-Loire department in south-central France.

== Population ==
Historical population
Year	Pop.	±% p.a.
1968	26	—
1975	27	+0.54%
1982	27	+0.00%
1990	32	+2.15%
1999	34	+0.68%
2007	33	−0.37%
2012	40	+3.92%
2017	35	−2.64%
2023	32	−1.48%
Source: INSEE

== See also ==
- Communes of the Haute-Loire department
