= Desges =

- Commune
- Location of Desges
- Location within France Location within Auvergne-Rhône-Alpes
- Coordinates: 45°01′05″N 3°27′11″E
- Country: France
- Region: Auvergne-Rhône-Alpes
- Department: Haute-Loire
- Arrondissement: Brioude
- Canton: Gorges de l'Allier-Gévaudan
- Intercommunality: Rives du Haut Allier

Government
  - Mayor (2020–2026): Joseph Vissac
- Area^{1}: 16.83 km^{2} (6.50 sq mi)
- Elevation: 700 m (2,300 ft)
- Highest elevation: 1,177 m (3,862 ft)
- Lowest elevation: 662 m (2,172 ft)
- Population (2023): 57
  - Density: 3.4/km^{2} (8.8/sq mi)
- Time zone: UTC+01:00 (CET)
  - Summer (DST): UTC+02:00 (CEST)
- INSEE/Postal code: 43085 /43300
- ^{1} French Land Register data, which excludes lakes, ponds, glaciers > 1 km^{2} (0.386 sq mi or 247 acres) and river estuaries.

Desges (French pronunciation: [dɛʒ]) is a commune in the Haute-Loire department and Auvergne-Rhône-Alpes region of southeast central France.

== Population ==
Historical population
Year	Pop.	±% p.a.
1968	89	—
1975	72	−2.98%
1982	76	+0.78%
1990	74	−0.33%
1999	79	+0.73%
2007	85	+0.92%
2012	60	−6.73%
2017	59	−0.34%
2023	57	−0.57%
Source: INSEE

== See also ==
- Communes of the Haute-Loire department
