= Auvers, Haute-Loire =

Auvers
- Commune
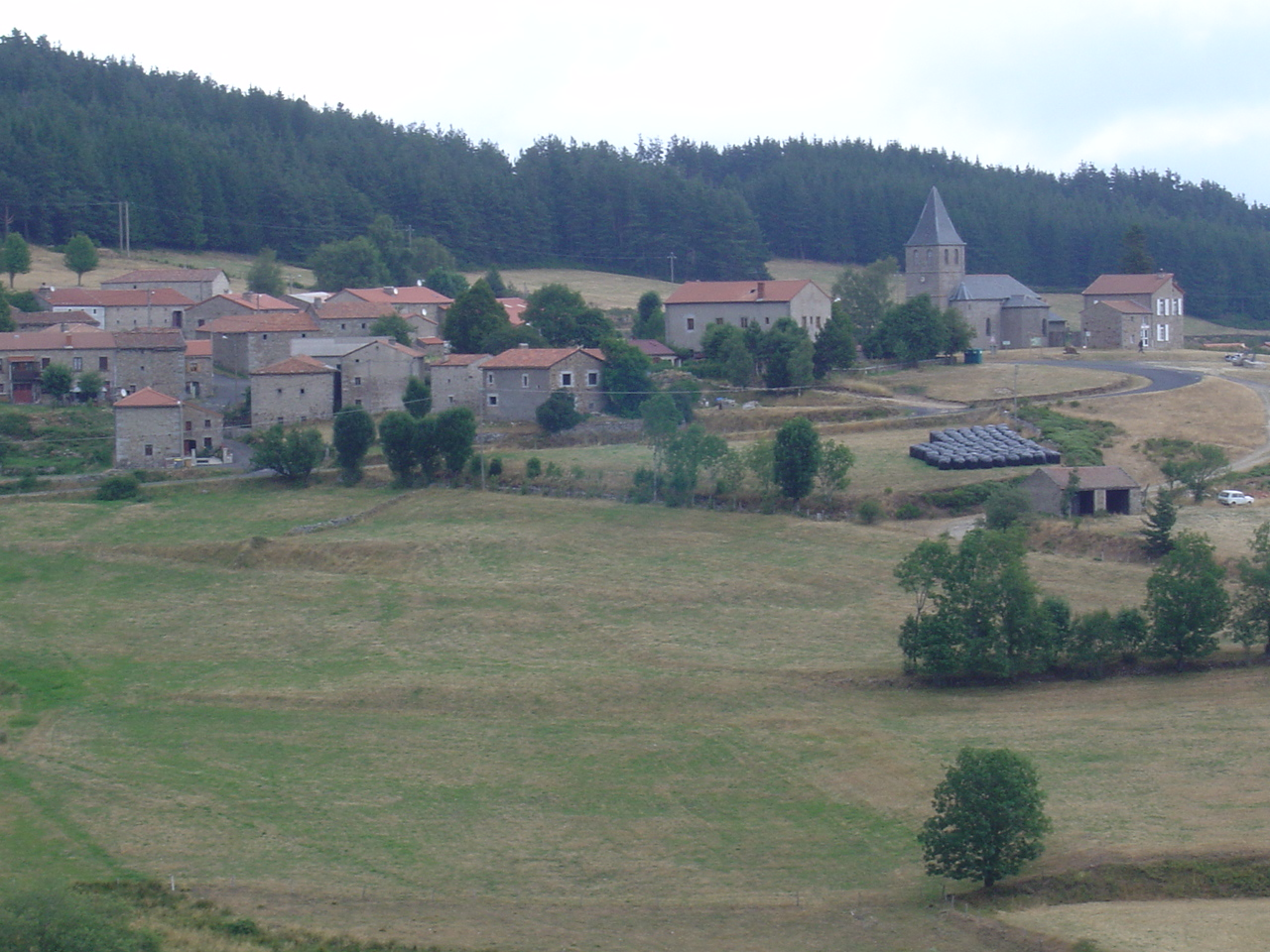
- View of Auvers
- Location of Auvers
- Location within France Location within Auvergne-Rhône-Alpes
- Coordinates: 44°59′49″N 3°24′11″E
- Country: France
- Region: Auvergne-Rhône-Alpes
- Department: Haute-Loire
- Arrondissement: Brioude
- Canton: Gorges de l'Allier-Gévaudan
- Intercommunality: Rives du Haut Allier

Government
  - Mayor (2020–2026): René Soulier
- Area^{1}: 21.5 km^{2} (8.3 sq mi)
- Elevation: 1,180 m (3,870 ft)
- Highest elevation: 1,496 m (4,908 ft)
- Lowest elevation: 756 m (2,480 ft)
- Population (2023): 48
  - Density: 2.2/km^{2} (5.8/sq mi)
- Time zone: UTC+01:00 (CET)
  - Summer (DST): UTC+02:00 (CEST)
- INSEE/Postal code: 43015 /43300
- ^{1} French Land Register data, which excludes lakes, ponds, glaciers > 1 km^{2} (0.386 sq mi or 247 acres) and river estuaries.

Auvers is a commune in the Haute-Loire department in south-central France.

== Population ==
Historical population
Year	Pop.	±% p.a.
1968	147	—
1975	125	−2.29%
1982	103	−2.73%
1990	86	−2.23%
1999	67	−2.74%
2007	60	−1.37%
2012	59	−0.34%
2017	54	−1.76%
2023	48	−1.94%
Source: INSEE

== Climate ==
Climate data for Auvers, 1134m (1991−2020 normals, 1986-2020 extremes)
Month	Jan	Feb	Mar	Apr	May	Jun	Jul	Aug	Sep	Oct	Nov	Dec	Year
Record high °C (°F)	16.0 (60.8)	18.8 (65.8)	20.3 (68.5)	23.3 (73.9)	26.6 (79.9)	35.0 (95.0)	33.7 (92.7)	33.6 (92.5)	29.5 (85.1)	24.0 (75.2)	19.2 (66.6)	15.2 (59.4)	35.0 (95.0)
Mean daily maximum °C (°F)	2.7 (36.9)	3.6 (38.5)	7.6 (45.7)	10.6 (51.1)	14.9 (58.8)	19.0 (66.2)	21.7 (71.1)	21.6 (70.9)	16.9 (62.4)	12.4 (54.3)	6.4 (43.5)	3.1 (37.6)	11.7 (53.1)
Daily mean °C (°F)	−0.7 (30.7)	−0.4 (31.3)	2.8 (37.0)	5.4 (41.7)	9.2 (48.6)	12.8 (55.0)	14.8 (58.6)	14.3 (57.7)	11.1 (52.0)	7.9 (46.2)	3.0 (37.4)	0.0 (32.0)	6.7 (44.0)
Mean daily minimum °C (°F)	−4.0 (24.8)	−4.4 (24.1)	−2.0 (28.4)	0.1 (32.2)	3.5 (38.3)	6.6 (43.9)	7.9 (46.2)	8.0 (46.4)	5.3 (41.5)	3.4 (38.1)	−0.5 (31.1)	−3.2 (26.2)	1.7 (35.1)
Record low °C (°F)	−23.2 (−9.8)	−21.0 (−5.8)	−24.5 (−12.1)	−11.5 (11.3)	−5.5 (22.1)	−3.1 (26.4)	−0.1 (31.8)	−2.5 (27.5)	−5.0 (23.0)	−11.3 (11.7)	−15.0 (5.0)	−18.5 (−1.3)	−24.5 (−12.1)
Average precipitation mm (inches)	75.2 (2.96)	65.7 (2.59)	63.2 (2.49)	95.8 (3.77)	101.1 (3.98)	87.5 (3.44)	82.3 (3.24)	77.4 (3.05)	93.0 (3.66)	107.8 (4.24)	110.9 (4.37)	85.4 (3.36)	1,045.3 (41.15)
Source: Météo-France

== See also ==
- Communes of the Haute-Loire department
- Bête du Gévaudan
