= Venteuges =

- Commune
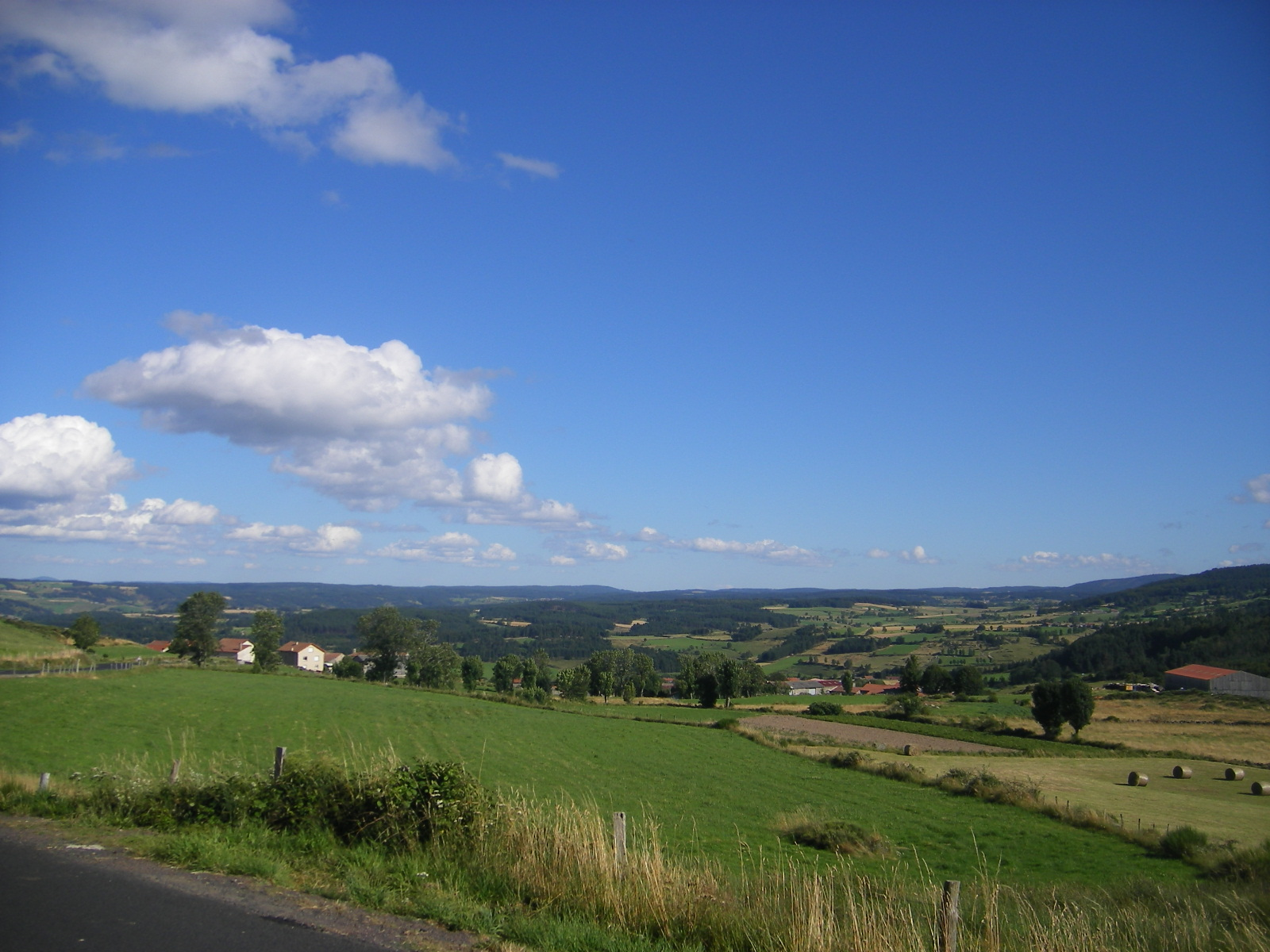
- Location of Venteuges
- Location within France Location within Auvergne-Rhône-Alpes
- Coordinates: 44°59′07″N 3°29′54″E
- Country: France
- Region: Auvergne-Rhône-Alpes
- Department: Haute-Loire
- Arrondissement: Brioude
- Canton: Gorges de l'Allier-Gévaudan

Government
  - Mayor (2020–2026): Michel Aubazac
- Area^{1}: 39.35 km^{2} (15.19 sq mi)
- Elevation: 1,055 m (3,461 ft)
- Highest elevation: 1,270 m (4,170 ft)
- Lowest elevation: 670 m (2,200 ft)
- Population (2023): 341
  - Density: 8.67/km^{2} (22.4/sq mi)
- Time zone: UTC+01:00 (CET)
  - Summer (DST): UTC+02:00 (CEST)
- INSEE/Postal code: 43256 /43170
- ^{1} French Land Register data, which excludes lakes, ponds, glaciers > 1 km^{2} (0.386 sq mi or 247 acres) and river estuaries.

Venteuges (French pronunciation: [vɑ̃tœʒ]; Occitan: Ventuèjol) is a commune in the Haute-Loire department in south-central France.

== Population ==
Historical population
Year	Pop.	±% p.a.
1968	663	—
1975	569	−2.16%
1982	540	−0.74%
1990	468	−1.77%
1999	380	−2.29%
2007	368	−0.40%
2012	358	−0.55%
2017	347	−0.62%
2023	341	−0.29%
Source: INSEE

== See also ==
- Communes of the Haute-Loire department
