= Chanaleilles =

- Commune
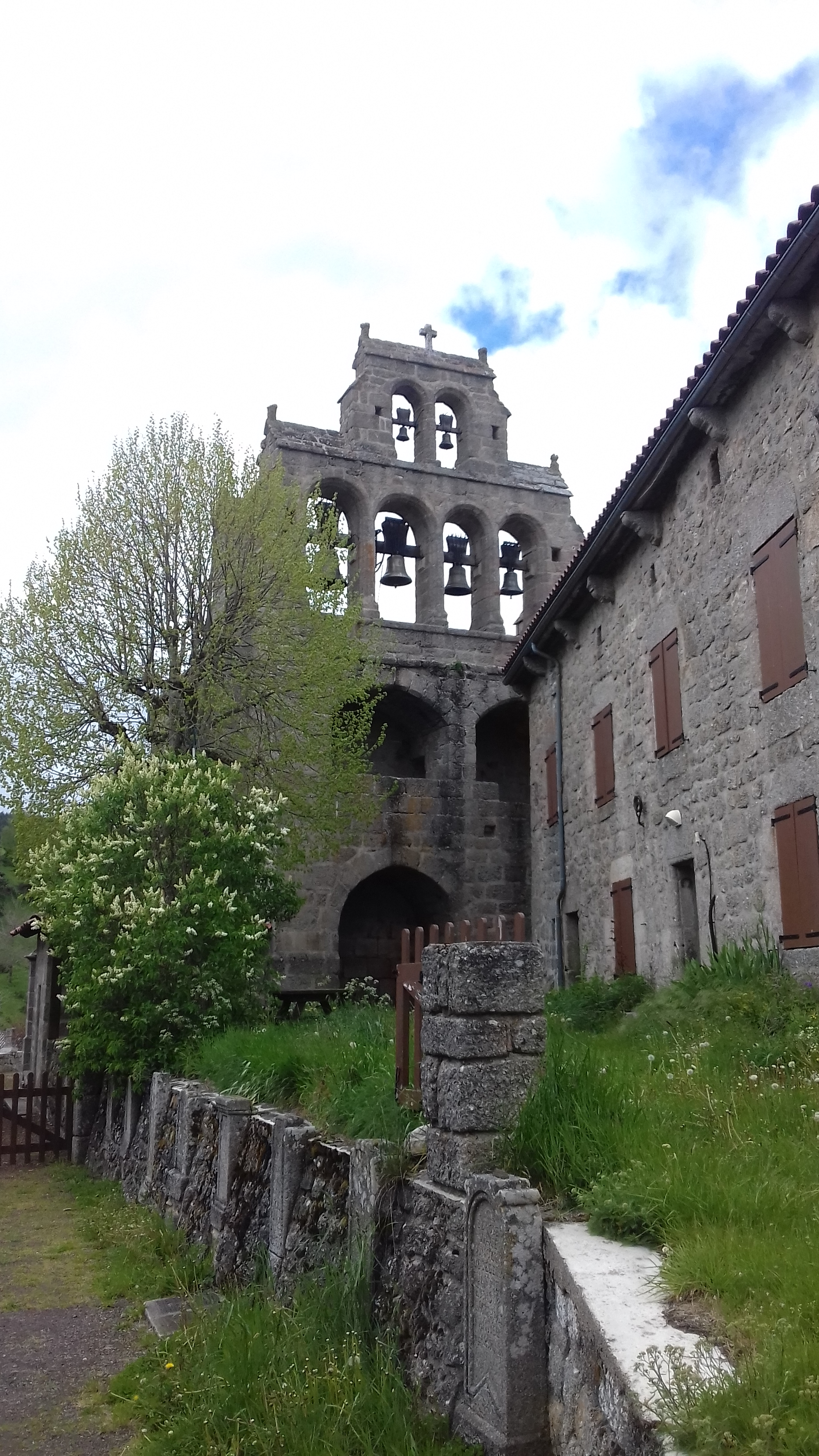
- The church in Chanaleilles

- Coat of arms
- Location of Chanaleilles
- Location within France Location within Auvergne-Rhône-Alpes
- Coordinates: 44°51′43″N 3°29′20″E
- Country: France
- Region: Auvergne-Rhône-Alpes
- Department: Haute-Loire
- Arrondissement: Brioude
- Canton: Gorges de l'Allier-Gévaudan

Government
  - Mayor (2020–2026): Alain Chateauneuf
- Area^{1}: 48.52 km^{2} (18.73 sq mi)
- Highest elevation: 1,486 m (4,875 ft)
- Lowest elevation: 1,077 m (3,533 ft)
- Population (2023): 173
  - Density: 3.57/km^{2} (9.23/sq mi)
- Time zone: UTC+01:00 (CET)
  - Summer (DST): UTC+02:00 (CEST)
- INSEE/Postal code: 43054 /43170
- ^{1} French Land Register data, which excludes lakes, ponds, glaciers > 1 km^{2} (0.386 sq mi or 247 acres) and river estuaries.

Chanaleilles (French pronunciation: [ʃanalɛj]; Occitan: Chanalelhas) is a commune in the Haute-Loire department in south-central France.

== Population ==
Historical population
Year	Pop.	±% p.a.
1968	395	—
1975	372	−0.85%
1982	330	−1.70%
1990	268	−2.57%
1999	228	−1.78%
2007	212	−0.91%
2012	195	−1.66%
2017	181	−1.48%
2023	173	−0.75%
Source: INSEE

== See also ==
- Communes of the Haute-Loire department
