= Saint-Arcons-d'Allier =

- Commune
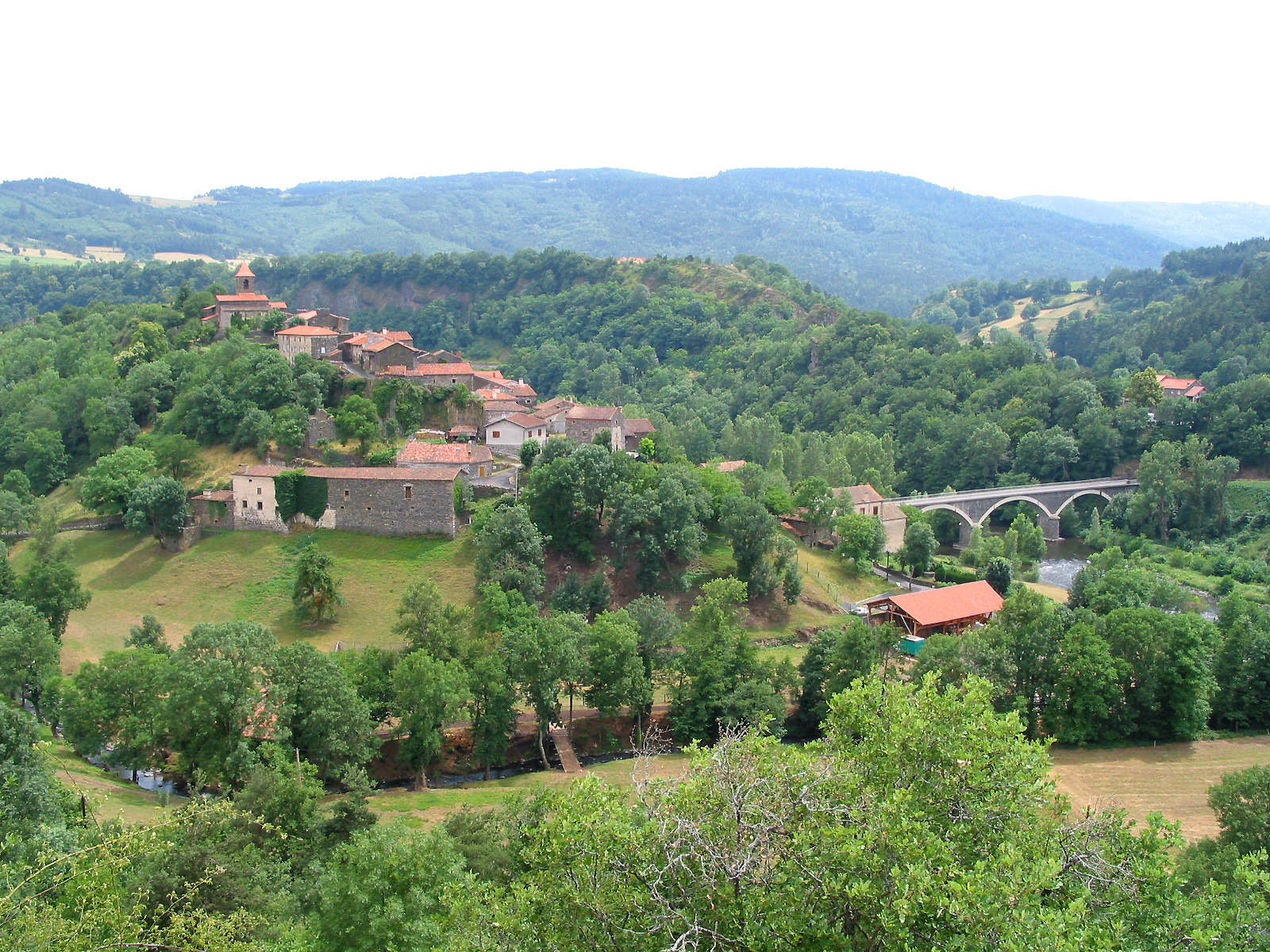
- Location of Saint-Arcons-d'Allier
- Location within France Location within Auvergne-Rhône-Alpes
- Coordinates: 45°04′09″N 3°33′02″E
- Country: France
- Region: Auvergne-Rhône-Alpes
- Department: Haute-Loire
- Arrondissement: Brioude
- Canton: Gorges de l'Allier-Gévaudan

Government
  - Mayor (2020–2026): Jean-Michel Durand
- Area^{1}: 16.08 km^{2} (6.21 sq mi)
- Elevation: 560 m (1,840 ft)
- Highest elevation: 1,045 m (3,428 ft)
- Lowest elevation: 498 m (1,634 ft)
- Population (2023): 189
  - Density: 11.8/km^{2} (30.4/sq mi)
- Time zone: UTC+01:00 (CET)
  - Summer (DST): UTC+02:00 (CEST)
- INSEE/Postal code: 43167 /43300
- ^{1} French Land Register data, which excludes lakes, ponds, glaciers > 1 km^{2} (0.386 sq mi or 247 acres) and river estuaries.

Saint-Arcons-d'Allier (French pronunciation: [sɛ̃.t‿aʁkɔ̃ dalje], Saint-Arcons of Allier; Occitan: Sent Arcon d'Alèir) is a commune in the Haute-Loire department in south-central France.

== Population ==
Historical population
Year	Pop.	±% p.a.
1968	279	—
1975	245	−1.84%
1982	203	−2.65%
1990	187	−1.02%
1999	164	−1.45%
2007	182	+1.31%
2012	202	+2.11%
2017	189	−1.32%
2023	189	+0.00%
Source: INSEE

== See also ==
- Communes of the Haute-Loire department
