= Thoras =

- Commune
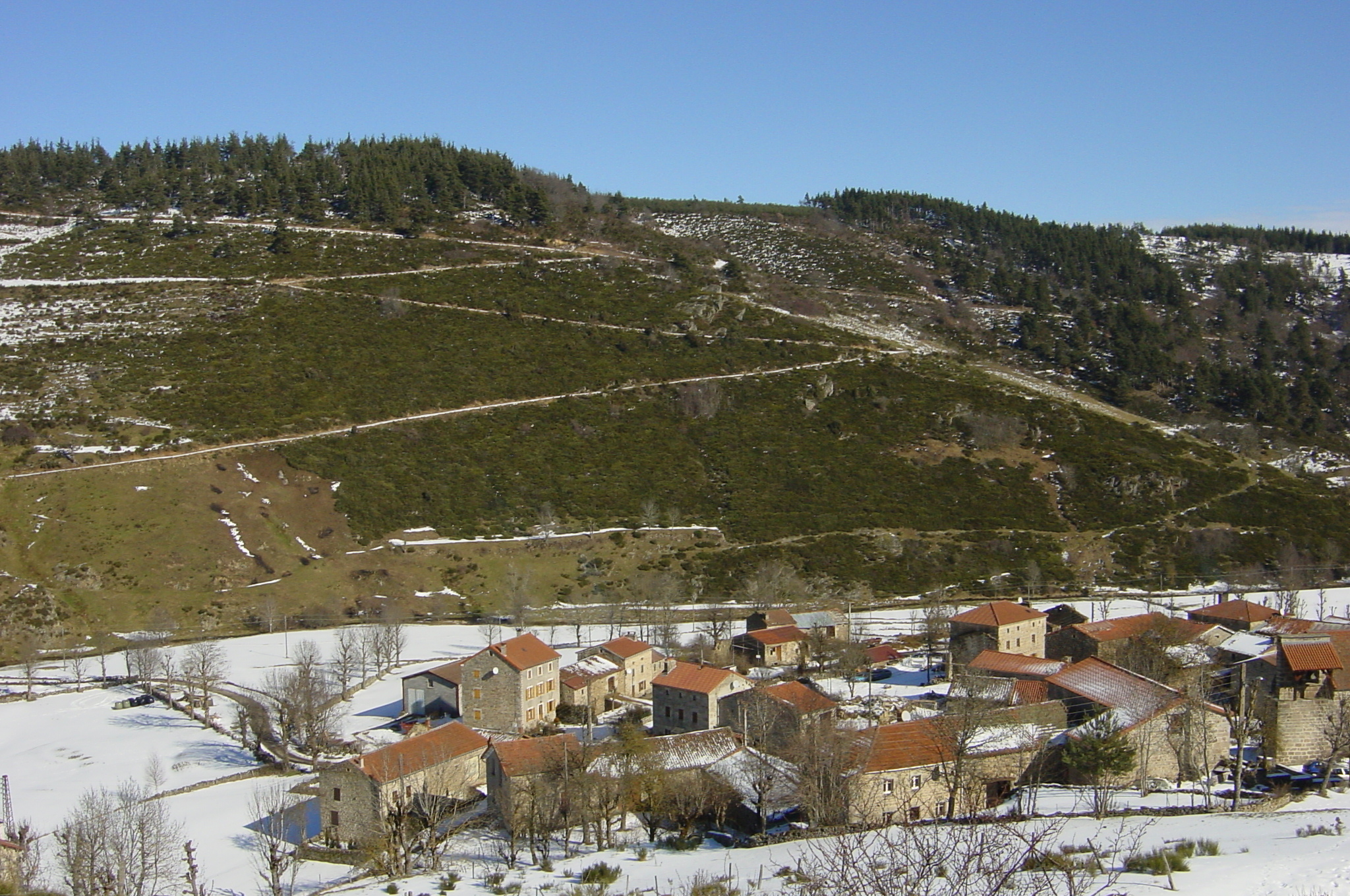
- Village of Croisances
- Location of Thoras
- Location within France Location within Auvergne-Rhône-Alpes
- Coordinates: 44°51′57″N 3°33′47″E
- Country: France
- Region: Auvergne-Rhône-Alpes
- Department: Haute-Loire
- Arrondissement: Brioude
- Canton: Gorges de l'Allier-Gévaudan

Government
  - Mayor (2020–2026): Ludovic Leydier
- Area^{1}: 44.93 km^{2} (17.35 sq mi)
- Elevation: 1,055 m (3,461 ft)
- Highest elevation: 1,371 m (4,498 ft)
- Lowest elevation: 960 m (3,150 ft)
- Population (2023): 243
  - Density: 5.41/km^{2} (14.0/sq mi)
- Time zone: UTC+01:00 (CET)
  - Summer (DST): UTC+02:00 (CEST)
- INSEE/Postal code: 43245 /43170
- ^{1} French Land Register data, which excludes lakes, ponds, glaciers > 1 km^{2} (0.386 sq mi or 247 acres) and river estuaries.

Thoras (French pronunciation: [tɔʁas]; Occitan: Toràs) is a commune in the Haute-Loire department in south-central France.

== History ==
On 1 January 2016, Thoras annexed the neighboring commune of Croisances.

== Population ==
Historical population
Year	Pop.	±% p.a.
1968	607	—
1975	492	−2.96%
1982	426	−2.04%
1990	365	−1.91%
1999	311	−1.76%
2007	261	−2.17%
2012	241	−1.58%
2017	229	−1.02%
2023	243	+0.99%
Populations of the area corresponding with the commune of Thoras at 1 January 2025. Source: INSEE

== See also ==
- Communes of the Haute-Loire department
