= Prades, Haute-Loire =

Prades
- Commune
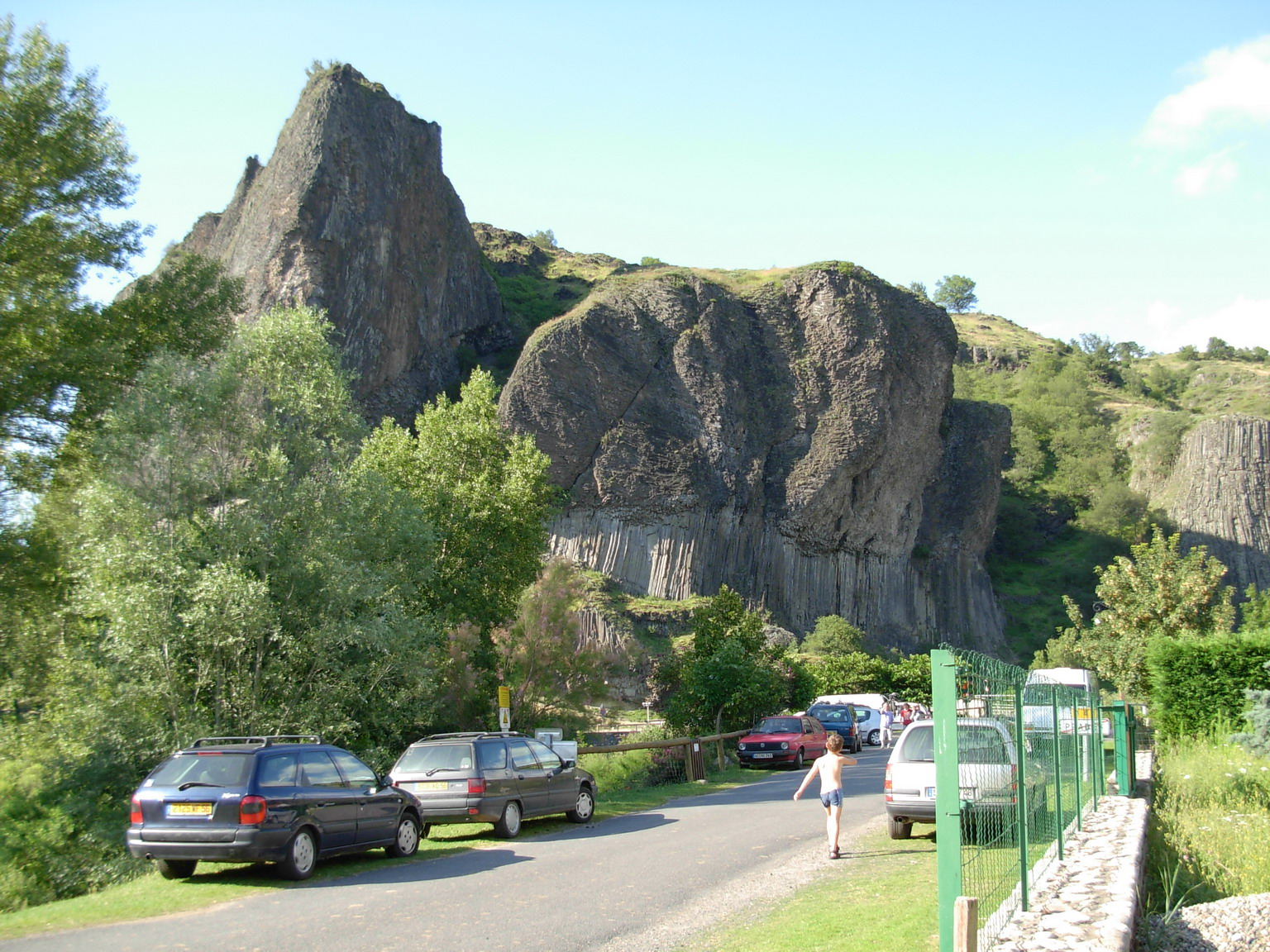
- Location of Prades
- Location within France Location within Auvergne-Rhône-Alpes
- Coordinates: 45°01′42″N 3°35′37″E
- Country: France
- Region: Auvergne-Rhône-Alpes
- Department: Haute-Loire
- Arrondissement: Brioude
- Canton: Gorges de l'Allier-Gévaudan

Government
  - Mayor (2020–2026): André Dorier
- Area^{1}: 4.82 km^{2} (1.86 sq mi)
- Elevation: 550 m (1,800 ft)
- Highest elevation: 880 m (2,890 ft)
- Lowest elevation: 535 m (1,755 ft)
- Population (2023): 77
  - Density: 16/km^{2} (41/sq mi)
- Time zone: UTC+01:00 (CET)
  - Summer (DST): UTC+02:00 (CEST)
- INSEE/Postal code: 43155 /43300
- ^{1} French Land Register data, which excludes lakes, ponds, glaciers > 1 km^{2} (0.386 sq mi or 247 acres) and river estuaries.

Prades (French pronunciation: [pʁad]; Occitan: Pradas) is a commune in the Haute-Loire department in south-central France.

== Population ==
Historical population
Year	Pop.	±% p.a.
1968	116	—
1975	84	−4.51%
1982	113	+4.33%
1990	57	−8.20%
1999	62	+0.94%
2007	60	−0.41%
2012	66	+1.92%
2017	64	−0.61%
2023	77	+3.13%
Source: INSEE

== See also ==
- Communes of the Haute-Loire department
