= Saint-Julien-des-Chazes =

- Commune
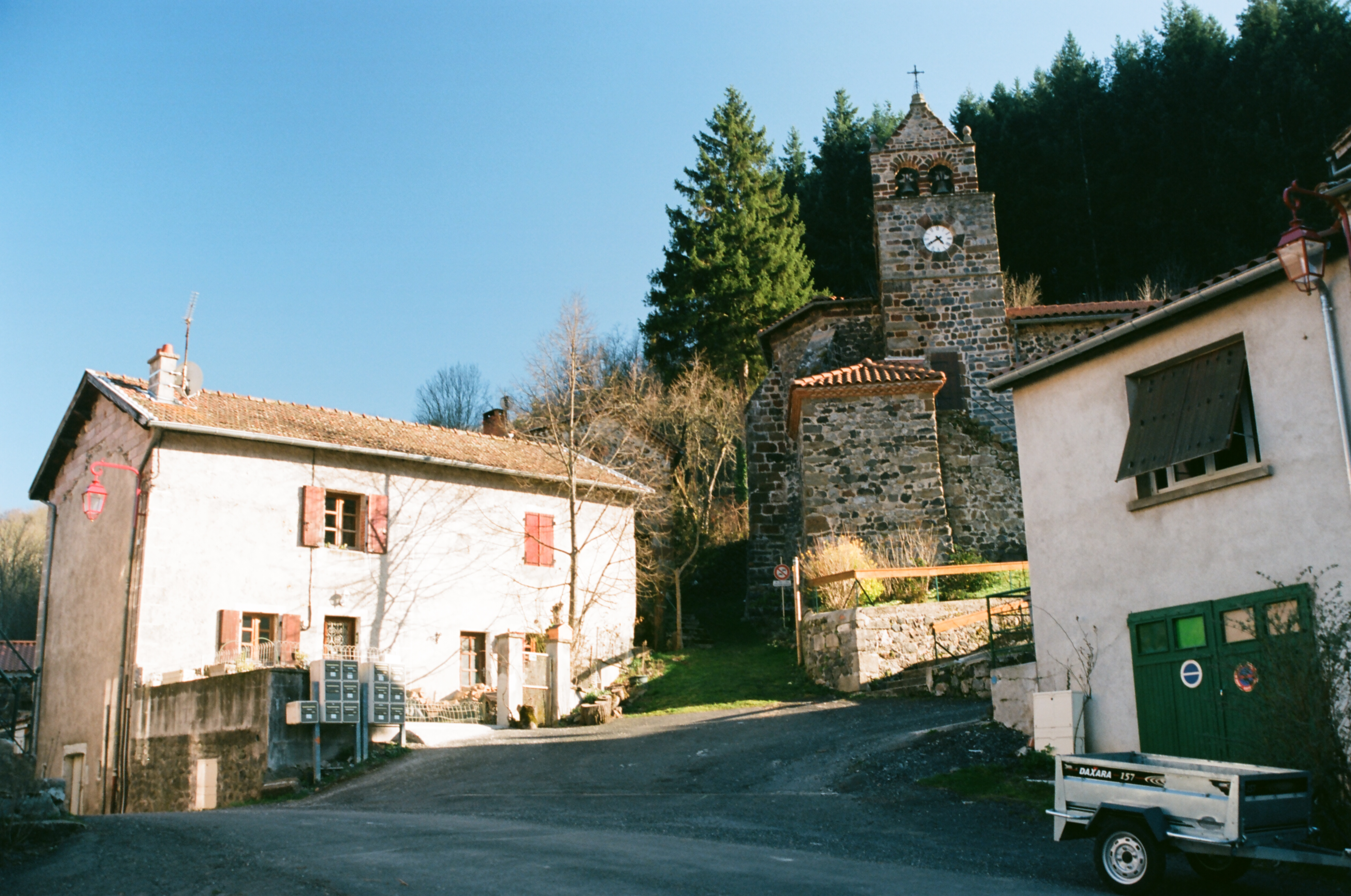
- Location of Saint-Julien-des-Chazes
- Location within France Location within Auvergne-Rhône-Alpes
- Coordinates: 45°02′51″N 3°35′03″E
- Country: France
- Region: Auvergne-Rhône-Alpes
- Department: Haute-Loire
- Arrondissement: Brioude
- Canton: Gorges de l'Allier-Gévaudan
- Intercommunality: Rives du Haut Allier

Government
  - Mayor (2020–2026): Sylvie Michel
- Area^{1}: 6.63 km^{2} (2.56 sq mi)
- Elevation: 546 m (1,791 ft)
- Highest elevation: 923 m (3,028 ft)
- Lowest elevation: 519 m (1,703 ft)
- Population (2023): 52
  - Density: 7.8/km^{2} (20/sq mi)
- Time zone: UTC+01:00 (CET)
  - Summer (DST): UTC+02:00 (CEST)
- INSEE/Postal code: 43202 /43300
- ^{1} French Land Register data, which excludes lakes, ponds, glaciers > 1 km^{2} (0.386 sq mi or 247 acres) and river estuaries.

Saint-Julien-des-Chazes (French pronunciation: [sɛ̃ ʒyljɛ̃ de ʃaz]; Auvergnat: Sent Julian de las Chasas) is a commune in the Haute-Loire department in south-central France.

== Population ==
Historical population
Year	Pop.	±% p.a.
1968	115	—
1975	107	−1.02%
1982	103	−0.54%
1990	92	−1.40%
1999	69	−3.15%
2007	81	+2.02%
2012	73	−2.06%
2017	67	−1.70%
2023	52	−4.14%
Source: INSEE

== See also ==
- Communes of the Haute-Loire department
