= Pébrac =

- Commune
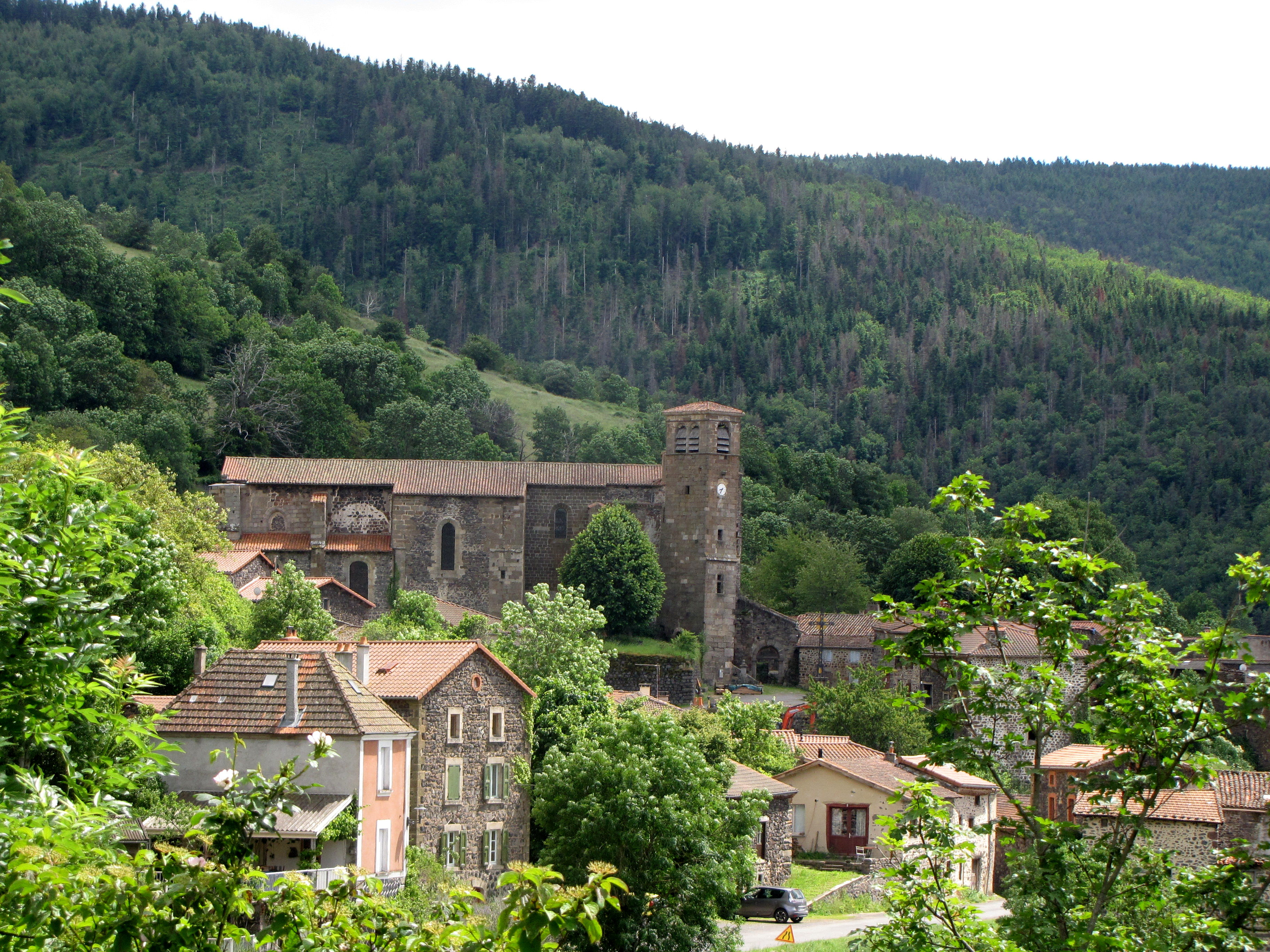
- Location of Pébrac
- Location within France Location within Auvergne-Rhône-Alpes
- Coordinates: 45°01′57″N 3°30′36″E
- Country: France
- Region: Auvergne-Rhône-Alpes
- Department: Haute-Loire
- Arrondissement: Brioude
- Canton: Gorges de l'Allier-Gévaudan

Government
  - Mayor (2020–2026): Alain Cussac
- Area^{1}: 17.85 km^{2} (6.89 sq mi)
- Elevation: 690 m (2,260 ft)
- Highest elevation: 1,071 m (3,514 ft)
- Lowest elevation: 560 m (1,840 ft)
- Population (2023): 113
  - Density: 6.33/km^{2} (16.4/sq mi)
- Time zone: UTC+01:00 (CET)
  - Summer (DST): UTC+02:00 (CEST)
- INSEE/Postal code: 43149 /43300
- ^{1} French Land Register data, which excludes lakes, ponds, glaciers > 1 km^{2} (0.386 sq mi or 247 acres) and river estuaries.

Pébrac (French pronunciation: [pebʁak]; Occitan: Pibrac) is a commune in the Haute-Loire department in south-central France.

== Population ==
Historical population
Year	Pop.	±% p.a.
1968	263	—
1975	233	−1.72%
1982	201	−2.09%
1990	178	−1.51%
1999	136	−2.95%
2007	126	−0.95%
2012	125	−0.16%
2017	114	−1.83%
2023	113	−0.15%
Source: INSEE

== See also ==
- Communes of the Haute-Loire department
