= Pinols =

- Commune
- Location of Pinols
- Location within France Location within Auvergne-Rhône-Alpes
- Coordinates: 45°03′09″N 3°24′51″E
- Country: France
- Region: Auvergne-Rhône-Alpes
- Department: Haute-Loire
- Arrondissement: Brioude
- Canton: Gorges de l'Allier-Gévaudan

Government
  - Mayor (2020–2026): Jessica Coudert
- Area^{1}: 34.92 km^{2} (13.48 sq mi)
- Elevation: 1,000 m (3,300 ft)
- Highest elevation: 1,428 m (4,685 ft)
- Lowest elevation: 706 m (2,316 ft)
- Population (2023): 181
  - Density: 5.18/km^{2} (13.4/sq mi)
- Time zone: UTC+01:00 (CET)
  - Summer (DST): UTC+02:00 (CEST)
- INSEE/Postal code: 43151 /43300
- ^{1} French Land Register data, which excludes lakes, ponds, glaciers > 1 km^{2} (0.386 sq mi or 247 acres) and river estuaries.

Pinols (French pronunciation: [pinɔl]; Occitan: Pinòus) is a commune in the Haute-Loire department in south-central France.

== Population ==
Historical population
Year	Pop.	±% p.a.
1968	463	—
1975	382	−2.71%
1982	333	−1.94%
1990	321	−0.46%
1999	267	−2.03%
2007	236	−1.53%
2012	223	−1.13%
2017	192	−2.95%
2023	181	−0.98%
Source: INSEE

== See also ==
- Communes of the Haute-Loire department
