= Chanteuges =

- Commune
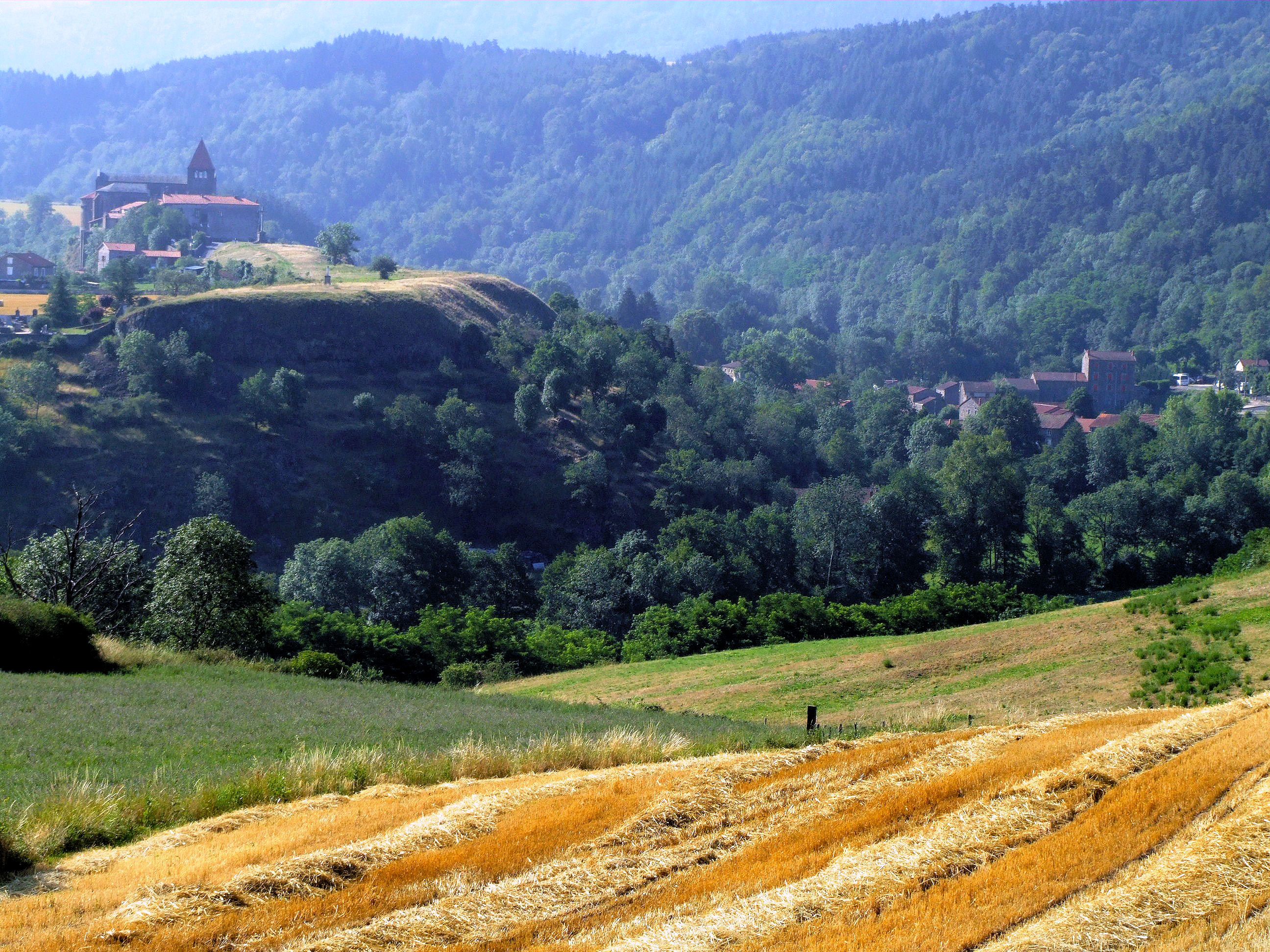
- Location of Chanteuges
- Location within France Location within Auvergne-Rhône-Alpes
- Coordinates: 45°04′24″N 3°31′56″E
- Country: France
- Region: Auvergne-Rhône-Alpes
- Department: Haute-Loire
- Arrondissement: Brioude
- Canton: Gorges de l'Allier-Gévaudan

Government
  - Mayor (2020–2026): Sandrine Roux
- Area^{1}: 16.33 km^{2} (6.31 sq mi)
- Highest elevation: 894 m (2,933 ft)
- Lowest elevation: 493 m (1,617 ft)
- Population (2023): 403
  - Density: 24.7/km^{2} (63.9/sq mi)
- Time zone: UTC+01:00 (CET)
  - Summer (DST): UTC+02:00 (CEST)
- INSEE/Postal code: 43056 /43300
- ^{1} French Land Register data, which excludes lakes, ponds, glaciers > 1 km^{2} (0.386 sq mi or 247 acres) and river estuaries.

Chanteuges (French pronunciation: [ʃɑ̃tøʒ]) is a commune in the Haute-Loire department in south-central France.

== Population ==
Historical population
| Year | Pop. | ±% p.a. |
|---|---|---|
| 1968 | 454 | — |
| 1975 | 358 | −3.34% |
| 1982 | 348 | −0.40% |
| 1990 | 376 | +0.97% |
| 1999 | 403 | +0.77% |
| 2007 | 412 | +0.28% |
| 2012 | 447 | +1.64% |
| 2017 | 441 | −0.27% |
| 2023 | 403 | −1.49% |
Source: INSEE

== See also ==
- Communes of the Haute-Loire department
