= Saint-Vénérand =

- Commune
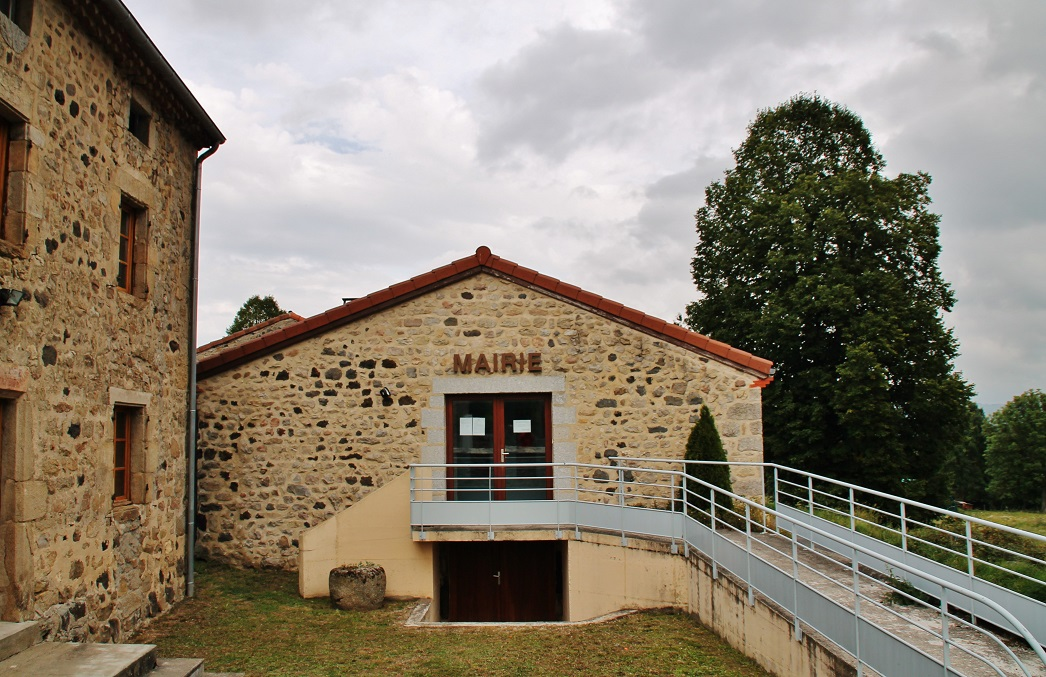
- Town hall

- Coat of arms
- Location of Saint-Vénérand
- Location within France Location within Auvergne-Rhône-Alpes
- Coordinates: 44°52′04″N 3°40′47″E
- Country: France
- Region: Auvergne-Rhône-Alpes
- Department: Haute-Loire
- Arrondissement: Brioude
- Canton: Gorges de l'Allier-Gévaudan

Government
  - Mayor (2020–2026): Élie Fraisse
- Area^{1}: 9.68 km^{2} (3.74 sq mi)
- Elevation: 1,020 m (3,350 ft)
- Highest elevation: 1,099 m (3,606 ft)
- Lowest elevation: 660 m (2,170 ft)
- Population (2023): 65
  - Density: 6.7/km^{2} (17/sq mi)
- Time zone: UTC+01:00 (CET)
  - Summer (DST): UTC+02:00 (CEST)
- INSEE/Postal code: 43225 /43580
- ^{1} French Land Register data, which excludes lakes, ponds, glaciers > 1 km^{2} (0.386 sq mi or 247 acres) and river estuaries.

Saint-Vénérand (French pronunciation: [sɛ̃ veneʁɑ̃]; Occitan: Sent Venerand) is a commune in the Haute-Loire department in south-central France.

== Population ==
Historical population
Year	Pop.	±% p.a.
1968	113	—
1975	84	−4.15%
1982	69	−2.77%
1990	69	+0.00%
1999	52	−3.09%
2007	55	+0.70%
2012	51	−1.50%
2017	52	+0.39%
2023	65	+3.79%
Source: INSEE

== See also ==
- Communes of the Haute-Loire department
