= Esplantas-Vazeilles =

- Commune
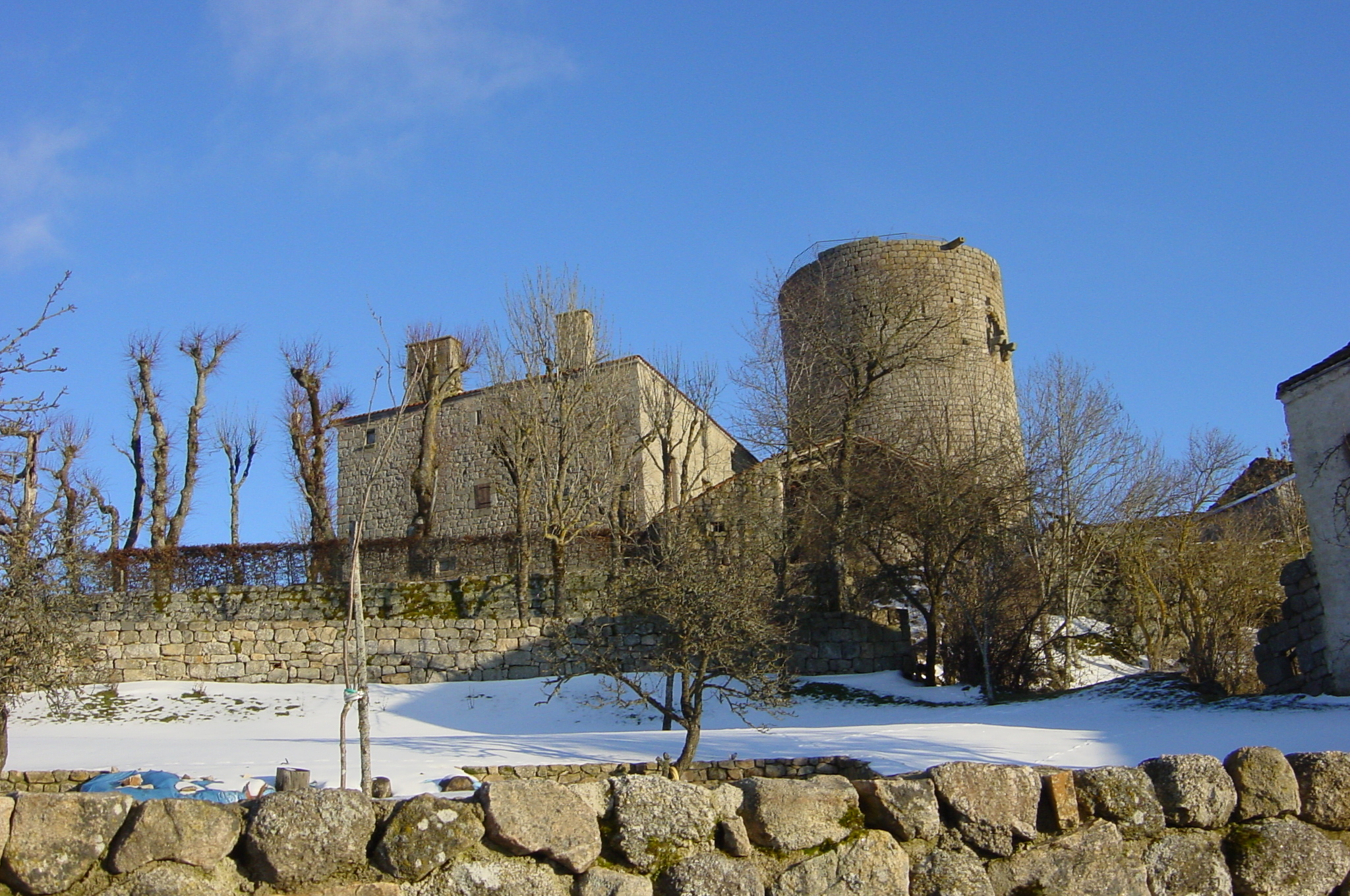
- Chateau of Esplantas
- Location of Esplantas-Vazeilles
- Location within France Location within Auvergne-Rhône-Alpes
- Coordinates: 44°54′29″N 3°32′49″E
- Country: France
- Region: Auvergne-Rhône-Alpes
- Department: Haute-Loire
- Arrondissement: Brioude
- Canton: Gorges de l'Allier-Gévaudan

Government
  - Mayor (2020–2026): Thierry Astruc
- Area^{1}: 17.13 km^{2} (6.61 sq mi)
- Highest elevation: 1,154 m (3,786 ft)
- Lowest elevation: 894 m (2,933 ft)
- Population (2023): 126
  - Density: 7.36/km^{2} (19.1/sq mi)
- Time zone: UTC+01:00 (CET)
  - Summer (DST): UTC+02:00 (CEST)
- INSEE/Postal code: 43090 /43170
- ^{1} French Land Register data, which excludes lakes, ponds, glaciers > 1 km^{2} (0.386 sq mi or 247 acres) and river estuaries.

Esplantas-Vazeilles is a commune in the Haute-Loire department in south-central France. The municipality was established on 1 January 2016 and consists of the former communes of Esplantas and Vazeilles-près-Saugues.

== Population ==
Historical population
Year	Pop.	±% p.a.
1968	292	—
1975	232	−3.23%
1982	187	−3.03%
1990	151	−2.64%
1999	139	−0.92%
2007	146	+0.62%
2012	139	−0.98%
2017	126	−1.94%
2023	126	+0.00%
Populations of the area corresponding with the commune of Esplantas-Vazeilles at 1 January 2025. Source: INSEE

== See also ==
- Communes of the Haute-Loire department
