= Saint-Bérain =

- Commune
- Location of Saint-Bérain
- Location within France Location within Auvergne-Rhône-Alpes
- Coordinates: 45°02′01″N 3°38′03″E
- Country: France
- Region: Auvergne-Rhône-Alpes
- Department: Haute-Loire
- Arrondissement: Brioude
- Canton: Gorges de l'Allier-Gévaudan

Government
  - Mayor (2020–2026): Serge Rocher
- Area^{1}: 13 km^{2} (5.0 sq mi)
- Elevation: 960 m (3,150 ft)
- Highest elevation: 1,301 m (4,268 ft)
- Lowest elevation: 551 m (1,808 ft)
- Population (2023): 95
  - Density: 7.3/km^{2} (19/sq mi)
- Time zone: UTC+01:00 (CET)
  - Summer (DST): UTC+02:00 (CEST)
- INSEE/Postal code: 43171 /43300
- ^{1} French Land Register data, which excludes lakes, ponds, glaciers > 1 km^{2} (0.386 sq mi or 247 acres) and river estuaries.

Saint-Bérain (French pronunciation: [sɛ̃ beʁɛ̃]; Occitan: Sent Beninh) is a commune in the Haute-Loire department in south-central France.

== Population ==
Historical population
Year	Pop.	±% p.a.
1968	197	—
1975	174	−1.76%
1982	177	+0.24%
1990	116	−5.14%
1999	118	+0.19%
2007	101	−1.93%
2012	83	−3.85%
2017	90	+1.63%
2023	95	+0.91%
Source: INSEE

== See also ==
- Communes of the Haute-Loire department
