= Croisances =

- Part of Thoras
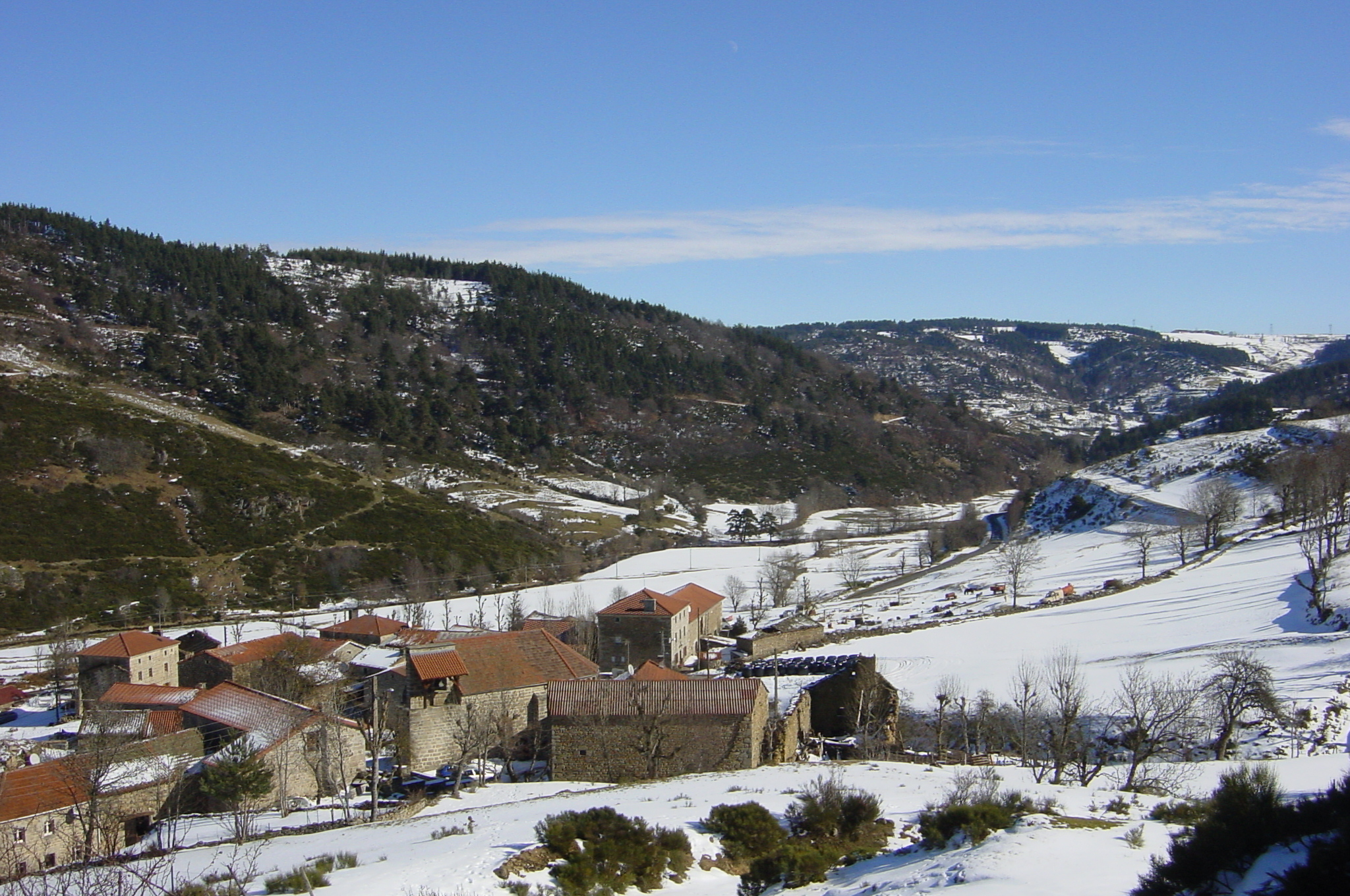
- Croisances in the snow
- Location of Croisances
- Location within France Location within Auvergne-Rhône-Alpes
- Coordinates: 44°53′59″N 3°36′51″E
- Country: France
- Region: Auvergne-Rhône-Alpes
- Department: Haute-Loire
- Arrondissement: Brioude
- Commune: Thoras
- Area^{1}: 7.37 km^{2} (2.85 sq mi)
- Elevation: 888 m (2,913 ft)
- Highest elevation: 1,151 m (3,776 ft)
- Lowest elevation: 867 m (2,844 ft)
- Population (2017): 30
  - Density: 4.1/km^{2} (11/sq mi)
- Time zone: UTC+01:00 (CET)
  - Summer (DST): UTC+02:00 (CEST)
- Postal code: 43580
- ^{1} French Land Register data, which excludes lakes, ponds, glaciers > 1 km^{2} (0.386 sq mi or 247 acres) and river estuaries.

Croisances (French pronunciation: [kʁwazɑ̃s]; Auvergnat: Crosanças) is a former commune in the Haute-Loire department in south-central France.

== History ==
On 1 January 2016, Croisances was annexed by the commune of Thoras.

== See also ==
- Communes of the Haute-Loire department
