= Canton of Gorges de l'Allier-Gévaudan =

Coordinates: 45.10°N 3.49°E

The canton of Gorges de l'Allier-Gévaudan is an administrative division of the Haute-Loire department, south-central France. It was created at the French canton reorganisation which came into effect in March 2015. Its seat is in Langeac.

It consists of the following communes:

1. Auvers
2. La Besseyre-Saint-Mary
3. Chanaleilles
4. Chanteuges
5. Charraix
6. Chazelles
7. Cubelles
8. Desges
9. Esplantas-Vazeilles
10. Grèzes
11. Langeac
12. Monistrol-d'Allier
13. Pébrac
14. Pinols
15. Prades
16. Saint-Arcons-d'Allier
17. Saint-Bérain
18. Saint-Christophe-d'Allier
19. Saint-Julien-des-Chazes
20. Saint-Préjet-d'Allier
21. Saint-Vénérand
22. Saugues
23. Siaugues-Sainte-Marie
24. Tailhac
25. Thoras
26. Venteuges
