= A75 autoroute =

Motorway in southern France

A75 autoroute
- La Méridienne (French)

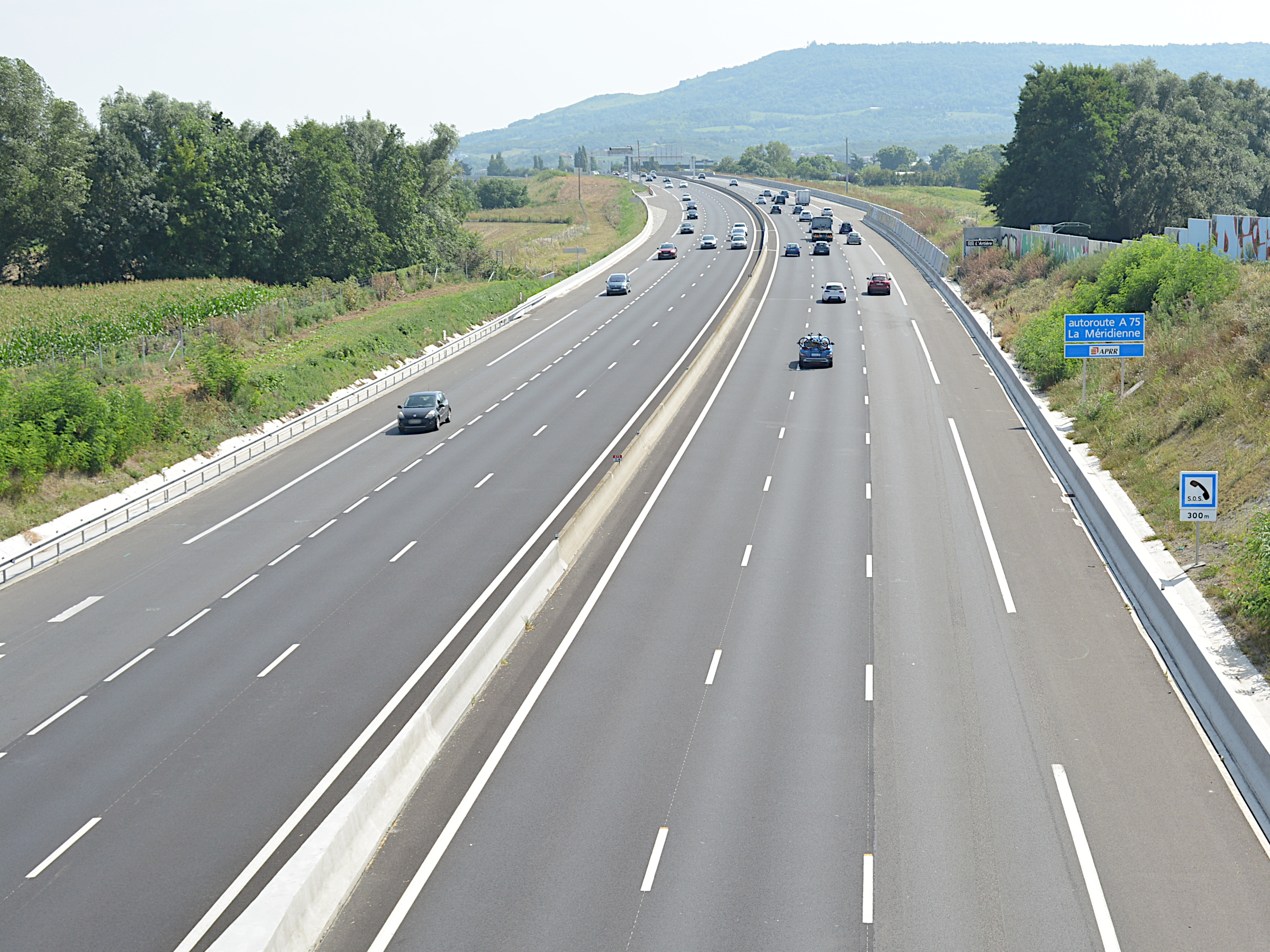
- Beginning of the autoroute at Clermont-Ferrand

Route information
- Part of E11
- Length: 335 km (208 mi)

Major junctions
- North end: E11 / A 71 / A 711 at Clermont-Ferrand

- A 750 at Ceyras

- South end: E15 / E80 / A 9 at Béziers

Location
- Country: France
- Regions: Auvergne-Rhône-Alpes, Occitania
- Departments: Puy-de-Dôme, Haute-Loire, Cantal, Lozère, Aveyron, Hérault

Highway system
- Roads in France; Autoroutes; Routes nationales

The A75 is an autoroute (motorway) in France.

Known also as la Méridienne, it is a developmental project aiming to speed up, and reduce the cost of car travel from Paris to the south of France. Apart from the Millau Viaduct, it is free for the entire 335 km (208 mi) between Clermont-Ferrand and Béziers. It was not due to be finished until spring 2011, but was fully opened in December 2010. South of St. Flour there are views of the Garabit viaduct.

A large portion of the A75 is also part of the European route E11.

== Engineering achievements ==
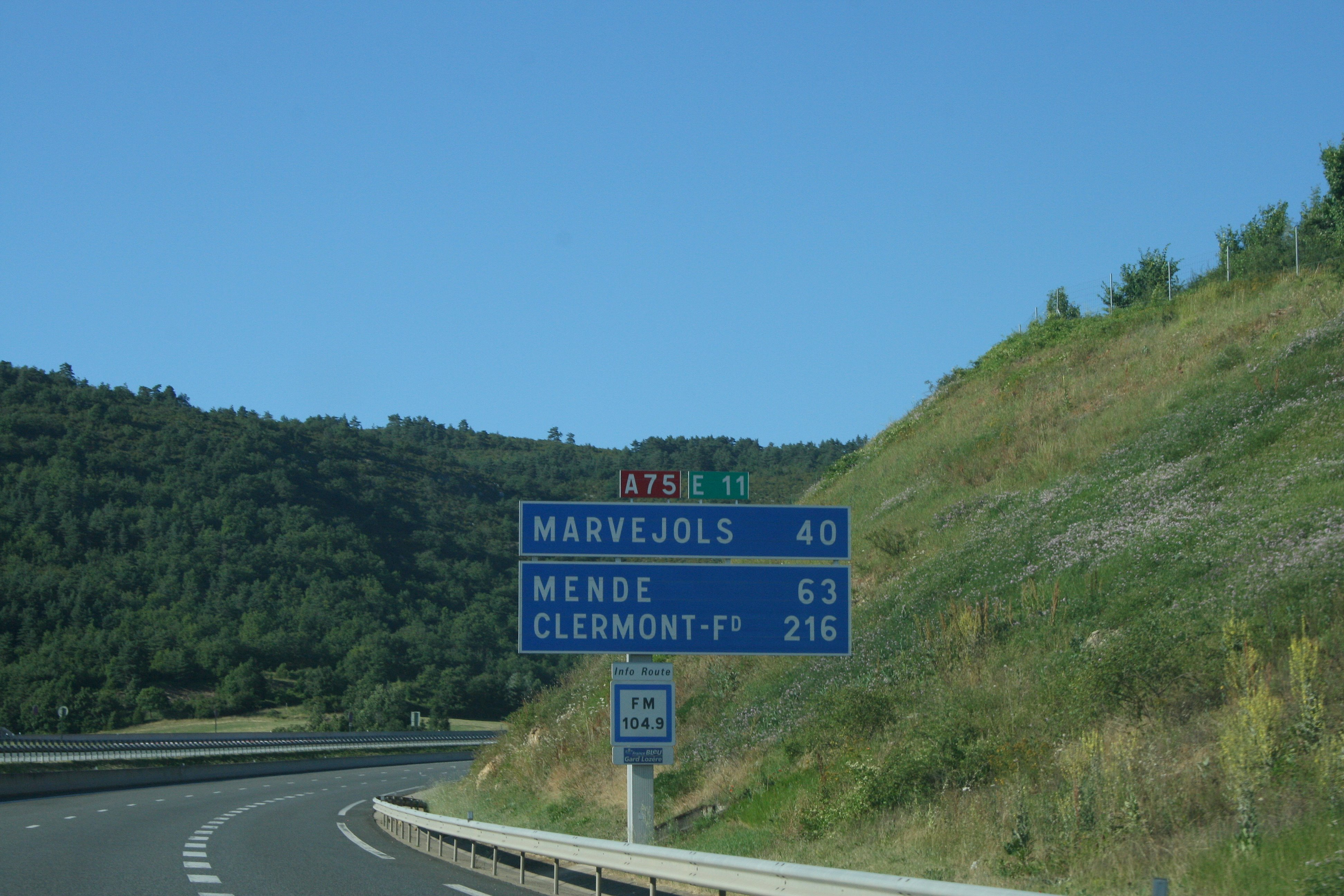

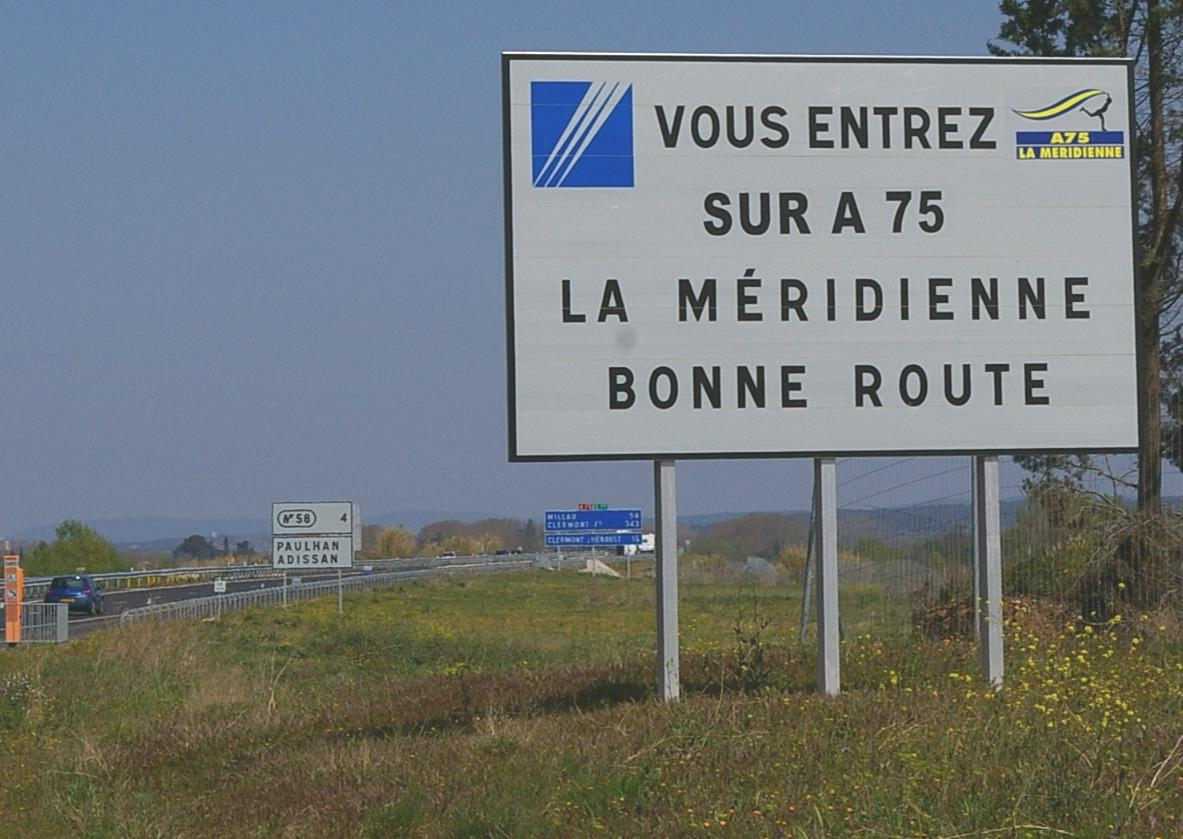
Northbound on the A75 after junction 59 near Pézenas. Translation: You are entering the A75 / La Méridienne / Have a good journey

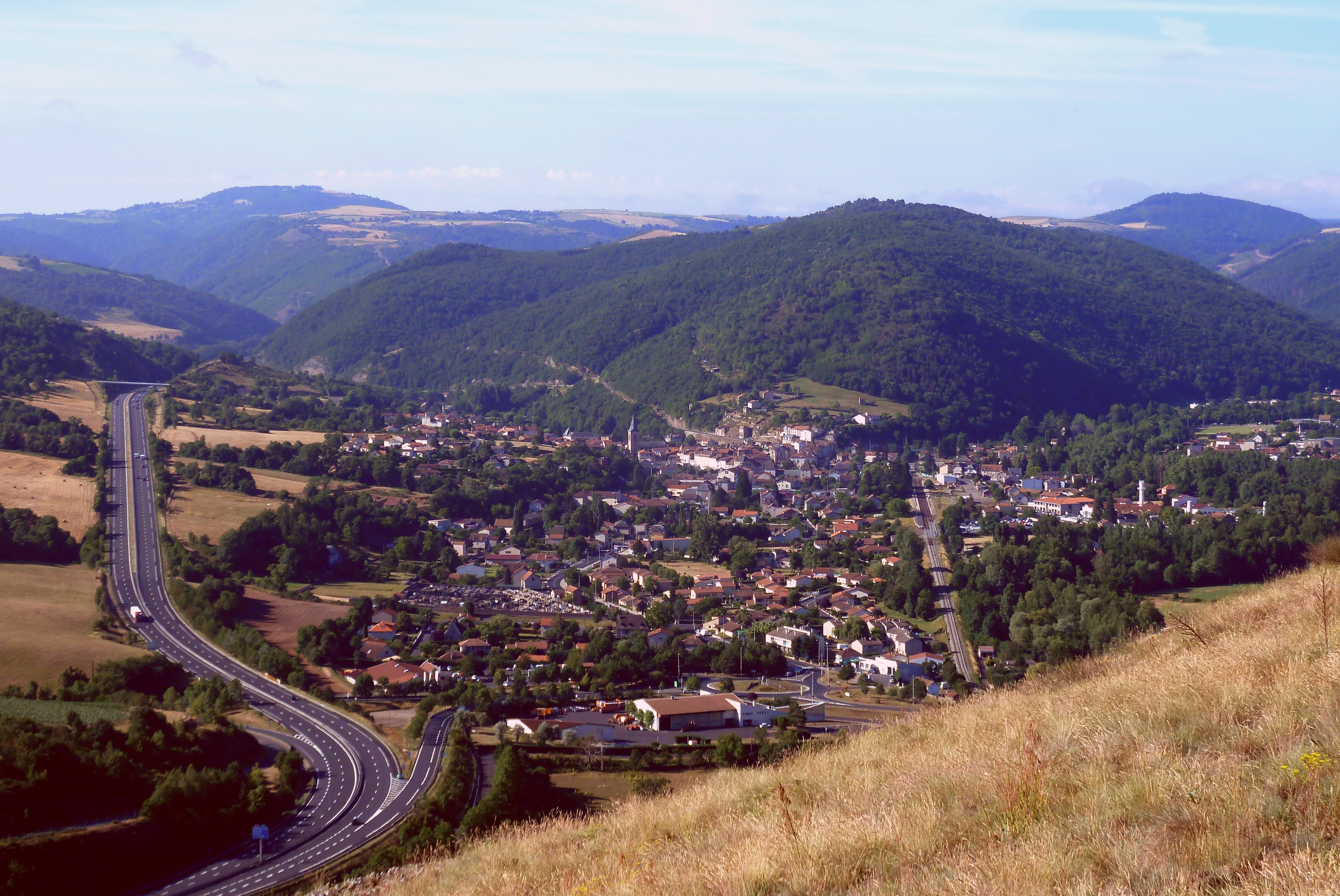
A75 near Massiac

The building of a motorway across the Massif Central, in itself, poses engineering challenges. Much of the motorway runs at an altitude in excess of 800 metres (2,600 ft) with 50 kilometres (31 mi) in excess of 1,000 metres (3,300 ft).

The greatest engineering challenge was the Millau Viaduct, which carries the road over the Tarn. It was constructed under a government contract with the Eiffage group, effective for 75 years. Eiffage collects tolls at agreed rates making this the only tolled part of the A75.

South of the Millau Viaduct in the Pégairolles-de-l'Escalette commune, the road descends from the Larzac Plateau into the Lergue river valley, losing several hundred meters in altitude in a short distance. Including the Tunnel de Pas d'Escalette, the relatively tight and twisty nature of the motorway at this point means that lower variable speed limits are imposed over this stretch of road.

Other features include: Viaducts and bridges

- Viaduc de la Violette, 560 metres (1,840 ft) long, between junctions 21 & 22
- Pont sur la Truyère, 311 metres (1,020 ft) long, between junctions 30 and 31
- Viaduc du Piou, 414 metres (1,358 ft) long, between junctions 38 and 39
- Viaduc du Ricoulong, 342 metres (1,122 ft) long, between junctions 38 and 39
- Viaduc de la Planchette, 221 metres (725 ft) long, between junctions 38 and 39
- Viaduc de Verrières, 710 metres (2,330 ft) long, between junctions 44 and 44.1
- Viaduc de la Garrigue, 340 metres (1,120 ft) long, between junctions 44.1 and 42
- Viaduc de Millau, 2,500 metres (8,200 ft) long, between junctions 45 and 46

Millau Viaduct

Passes

- 990 metres (3,250 ft) between junctions 24 and 25
- Col de la Fageole, 1,107 metres (3,632 ft), between junctions 26 and 27
- Col des Issartets, 1,121 metres (3,678 ft), the highest point on the A75, between junctions 36 and 37
- Col de la Fagette, 882 metres (2,894 ft), between junctions 40 and 41
- Col d'Engayresque, 888 metres (2,913 ft), between junctions 44 and 44.1

Tunnels

- Tunnel de Montjezieu, 616 metres (2,021 ft), long at an altitude of 650 metres (2,130 ft), between junctions 39.1 and 40
- Tunnel de Pas d'Escalette, 725 metres (2,379 ft) southbound, 830 metres (2,720 ft) northbound, between junctions 50 and 51
- Tunnel de la Vierge, 474 metres (1,555 ft), between junctions 52 and 53

== The route ==
Region	Department	Junction	Destinations	Notes
Auvergne-Rhône-Alpes	Puy-de-Dôme	A711 - A75 & A71	Lyon (A89), Saint-Étienne, Thiers	
Auvergne-Rhône-Alpes	Puy-de-Dôme	E11 / A 71 becomes E11 / A 75		
Auvergne-Rhône-Alpes	Puy-de-Dôme	1 : Clermont-Ferrand - La Pardieu	Billom, Cournon-d'Auvergne	
Auvergne-Rhône-Alpes	Puy-de-Dôme	2 : Pérignat-lès-Sarliève	Bordeaux, Clermont-Ferrand, La Bourboule, Mont-Dore, Aubière	
Auvergne-Rhône-Alpes	Puy-de-Dôme	3 : Cournon	Cournon-d'Auvergne, Pérignat-lès-Sarliève, Z. I. Cournon, Grande Halle, Zénith	
Auvergne-Rhône-Alpes	Puy-de-Dôme	4 : La Noviale-Gergovie	Vic-le-Comte, Le Cendre, Gergovie, Pérignat-lès-Sarliève, La Roche-Blanche, Orcet	
Auvergne-Rhône-Alpes	Puy-de-Dôme	5 : Le Crest	Aydat, Saint-Amant-Tallende, Veyre-Monton, Orcet	
Auvergne-Rhône-Alpes	Puy-de-Dôme	Aire de Veyre (Southbound)		
Auvergne-Rhône-Alpes	Puy-de-Dôme	6 La Sauvetat	Besse, Saint-Nectaire, Champeix, Veyre-Monton	
Auvergne-Rhône-Alpes	Puy-de-Dôme	Aire d’Authezat (Northbound)		
Auvergne-Rhône-Alpes	Puy-de-Dôme	7 : Montpeyroux	Montpeyroux, Coudes	
Auvergne-Rhône-Alpes	Puy-de-Dôme	8 : Coudes	Coudes, Vic-le-Comte	
Auvergne-Rhône-Alpes	Puy-de-Dôme	9 : Veneix	Sauvagnat-Sainte-Marthe, Saint-Yvoine	
Auvergne-Rhône-Alpes	Puy-de-Dôme	Aire du Val d'Allier (Southbound)		
Auvergne-Rhône-Alpes	Puy-de-Dôme	10 : La Ribeyre	La Ribeyre	
Auvergne-Rhône-Alpes	Puy-de-Dôme	11 : Issoire - nord	Issoire - centre	Entry and exit from Clermont-Ferrand
Auvergne-Rhône-Alpes	Puy-de-Dôme	12 : Issoire - Les Prés	Orbeil, Issoire	
Auvergne-Rhône-Alpes	Puy-de-Dôme	13 : Issoire - Couze	Saint-Germain-l'Herm, Ambert, Sauxillanges, Parentignat, Issoire	
Auvergne-Rhône-Alpes	Puy-de-Dôme	14 : Issoire - Chapeau Rouge	Besse, Saint-Nectaire, Champeix, Issoire - Aérodrome, centre	
Auvergne-Rhône-Alpes	Puy-de-Dôme	15 : Le Broc	Ardes, Saint-Germain-Lembron, Le Broc, Le Breuil-sur-Couze	
Auvergne-Rhône-Alpes	Puy-de-Dôme	16 : Civerac	Le Broc	
Auvergne-Rhône-Alpes	Puy-de-Dôme	Aire du Cézallier (Southbound); Aire du Lembron (Northbound)		
Auvergne-Rhône-Alpes	Puy-de-Dôme	17 : Les Coustilles	Jumeaux, Auzat-la-Combelle, Saint-Germain-Lembron, Le Breuil-sur-Couze	
Auvergne-Rhône-Alpes	Puy-de-Dôme	18 : Charbonnier-les-Mines	Brassac-les-Mines, Sainte-Florine, Charbonnier-les-Mines	
Auvergne-Rhône-Alpes	Haute-Loire	19 : Lempdes-sur-Allagnon - nord	Lempdes-sur-Allagnon, Auzon	Entry and exit from Clermont-Ferrand
Auvergne-Rhône-Alpes	Haute-Loire	20 : Lempdes-sur-Allagnon - sud	Le Puy-en-Velay, Brioude, Sainte-Florine, Vergongheon	
Auvergne-Rhône-Alpes	Haute-Loire	21 : La Fayette	Ardes, Lorlanges	
Auvergne-Rhône-Alpes	Haute-Loire	21 : La Fayette	Aire de La Fayette	
Auvergne-Rhône-Alpes	Haute-Loire	22 : Espalem	Brioude, Blesle, Espalem	
Auvergne-Rhône-Alpes	Cantal	Aire du Chalet (Southbound)		
Auvergne-Rhône-Alpes	Cantal	23 : Massiac - nord	Aurillac, Le Lioran, Murat, Massiac	Entry and exit from Clermont-Ferrand
Auvergne-Rhône-Alpes	Cantal	24 : Massiac - sud	Massiac	Entry and exit from Béziers
Auvergne-Rhône-Alpes	Cantal	25 : Espezolles	Saint-Poncy	
Auvergne-Rhône-Alpes	Cantal	26 : La Fageolle	Vieillespesse	
Auvergne-Rhône-Alpes	Cantal	27 : Salcrus	Coren, Montchamp	
Auvergne-Rhône-Alpes	Cantal	Aire de Montchauvet (Northbound)		
Auvergne-Rhône-Alpes	Cantal	28 : Saint-Flour - nord	Espalion, Chaudes-Aigues, Coren, Saint-Flour - centre, Bel-Air, Aurillac, Murat	
Auvergne-Rhône-Alpes	Cantal	29 : Saint-Flour - est	Saint-Flour - centre, Bellevue, Saint-Georges	
Auvergne-Rhône-Alpes	Cantal	30 : La Gazelle	Ruynes-en-Margeride, Gabarit - Viaduc Eiffel	
Auvergne-Rhône-Alpes	Cantal	Aire de Garabit viaduc Eiffel		
Auvergne-Rhône-Alpes	Cantal	31 : Loubaresse	Loubaresse, Gabarit - Viaduc Eiffel	
Occitanie	Lozère	32 : Combe-Jouve	Albaret-Sainte-Marie - La Garde, Les Monts-Verts - Le Bacon	
Occitanie	Lozère	32 : Combe-Jouve	Aire de La Lozère	
Occitanie	Lozère	33 : Saint-Chély-d'Apcher - nord	Fournels, Le Malzieu-Ville, Saint-Chély-d'Apcher	
Occitanie	Lozère	34 : Saint-Chély-d'Apcher - sud	Le Malzieu-Ville, Saint-Alban-sur-Limagnole, Saint-Chély-d'Apcher, Rimeize, Chaudes-Aigues, Fournels	
Occitanie	Lozère	Aire de l’Aubrac		
Occitanie	Lozère	35 : Aumont-Aubrac - nord	Aumont-Aubrac, Nasbinals	Entry and exit from Clermont-Ferrand
Occitanie	Lozère	36 : Aumont-Aubrac - sud	Aumont-Aubrac	Entry and exit from Béziers
Occitanie	Lozère	37 : Le Buisson	Le Buisson	
Occitanie	Lozère	38 : La Bastide	Antrenas, Marvejols, Nasbinals	
Occitanie	Lozère	Aire de la Bête du Gévaudan (Southbound); Aire de Marvejols (Northbound)		
Occitanie	Lozère	39 : Le Monastier	Le Monastier, Chirac	
Occitanie	Lozère	39.1 : Moriès	Nîmes, Mende, Florac, Chanac, Gorges du Tarn	
Occitanie	Lozère	39.2 : Saint-Germain-du-Teil	Saint-Germain-du-Teil	Entry and exit from Clermont-Ferrand
Occitanie	Lozère	40 : Banassac	Banassac, La Canourgue, Gorges du Tarn, Saint-Germain-du-Teil, Saint-Laurent-d'Olt	
Occitanie	Aveyron	41 : Farnajous	Campagnac, Saint-Geniez-d'Olt	
Occitanie	Aveyron	42 : Séverac-le-Château	Rodez, Sévérac-le-Château, le Massegros, Laissac	
Occitanie	Aveyron	42 : Séverac-le-Château	Aire de l'Aveyron	
Occitanie	Aveyron	43 : Sermeillets	Le Massegros	Entry and exit from Béziers
Occitanie	Aveyron	44 : Engayresque	Engayresque, Verrières	
Occitanie	Aveyron	44.1 : Aguessac - Gorges du Tarn	Cahors, Meyrueis, Pont-de-Salars, Vézins-de-Lévézou, Aguessac, Micropolis, Vezins de Levezon, Pont de Salars, Meyrenes, Gorges du Tarn	
Occitanie	Aveyron	Aire de la Garrigue		
Occitanie	Aveyron	45 : Millau - Saint-Germain	Millau, Saint-Beauzély, Castelnau-Pégayrols	
Occitanie	Aveyron	Péage de Saint-Germain (du Viaduc de Millau)		
Occitanie	Aveyron	Aire du Viaduc de Millau		
Occitanie	Aveyron	46 : Saint-Rome-de-Cernon	Albi, Saint-Affrique, Roquefort, Saint-Rome-de-Cernon	
Occitanie	Aveyron	47 : La Cavalerie	Millau - centre, Nant, La Cavalerie, Saint-Affrique, Roquefort, Sainte-Eulalie-de-Cernon, Gorges du Tarn	
Occitanie	Aveyron	Aire du Larzac		
Occitanie	Aveyron	48 : Larzac	L'Hospitalet-du-Larzac, La Couvertoirade, Cornus, Alzon, Le Vigan	
Occitanie	Hérault	49 : Le Caylar	Le Caylar, La Couvertoirade, Cirque de Navacelles	
Occitanie	Hérault	49 : Le Caylar	Aire du Caylar	
Occitanie	Hérault	50 : Saint-Félix-de-l'Héras	Saint-Félix-de-l'Héras, Les Rives	Entry and exit from Béziers
Occitanie	Hérault	Aire du Belvédère de la Lerque (Southbound)		
Occitanie	Hérault	51 : Pégairolles-de-l'Escalette	Pégairolles-de-l'Escalette	
Occitanie	Hérault	52 : Lodève - nord	Lodève, Soubès, Le Vigan, Ganges, Cirque de Navacelles	
Occitanie	Hérault	53 : Lodève - sud	Lodève, Lunas, Bédarieux, Le Bousquet-d'Orb, Lamalou-les-Bains	Entry and exit from Béziers
Occitanie	Hérault	54 : Mas Lavayre	Le Bosc, Lodève - sud, Saint-Jean-de-la-Blaquière, Lac du Salagou	No southbound entry
Occitanie	Hérault	55 : Saint-Fréchoux	Lac du Salagou	Southbound entry and northbound exit only
Occitanie	Hérault	56 : Salelles-du-Bosc	Ceyras, Salelles-du-Bosc, Saint-Jean-de-la-Blaquière, Saint-Félix-de-Lodez	
Occitanie	Hérault	A750 - A75	Montpellier, Saint-Guilhem-le-Désert, Gignac, Saint-André-de-Sangonis	
Occitanie	Hérault	57 : Clermont-l'Hérault	Bédarieux, Canet, Nébian, Clermont-l'Hérault, Lac du Salagou	
Occitanie	Hérault	Aire de Paulhan		
Occitanie	Hérault	58 : Paulhan	Paulhan, Adissan, Lézignan-la-Cèbe	
Occitanie	Hérault	59 : La Grange des Prés	Sète, Mèze, Montagnac, Lézignan-la-Cèbe, Pézenas - nord	
Occitanie	Hérault	59.1 : Pézenas - centre	Pézenas, Castelnau-de-Guers	
Occitanie	Hérault	60 : Conas	Agde, Bessan, Florensac	Entry and exit from Clermont-Ferrand
Occitanie	Hérault	61 : Pézenas - sud	Roujan, Tourbes, Valros, Pézenas	
Occitanie	Hérault	Aire de Valros		
Occitanie	Hérault	62 : La Bégude de Jordy	Servian, Montblanc, Florensac, Valros	
Occitanie	Hérault	63 Béziers - nord	Béziers - centre, Narbonne, Boujan-sur-Libron	Entry and exit from Clermont-Ferrand
Occitanie	Hérault	64 : Béziers - centre	Valras-Plage, Serignan, Béziers Cap d'Agde Airport, Béziers - est	
Occitanie	Hérault	A9 - A75	Montpellier, Sète, Lyon (A7)	
Occitanie	Hérault	A9 - A75	Narbonne, Barcelone, Toulouse (A61)	
1.000 mi = 1.609 km; 1.000 km = 0.621 mi

In May 2007, construction started on the final section of the A75, a connection from Pézenas to the A9 autoroute a kilometre or so east of the previous Béziers east intersection 35. The route to the south of the present D609 Pézenas-Béziers road bypassing Valros opened in February 2009. Further sections opened in spring 2010. The final section, a gap between Valros and Servian, was completed in December 2010. According to Serge Cuculière, construction operations manager, the delay was due to difficulties encountered on the section ("Les difficultés recontrées sur la section exigent un temps de réalisation plus important").

== Village étape ==
The Autoroute is served by the following four Village étapes, Aumont-Aubrac, La Canourgue, Le Caylar and Massiac.
