= Route nationale 9 =

Road in France

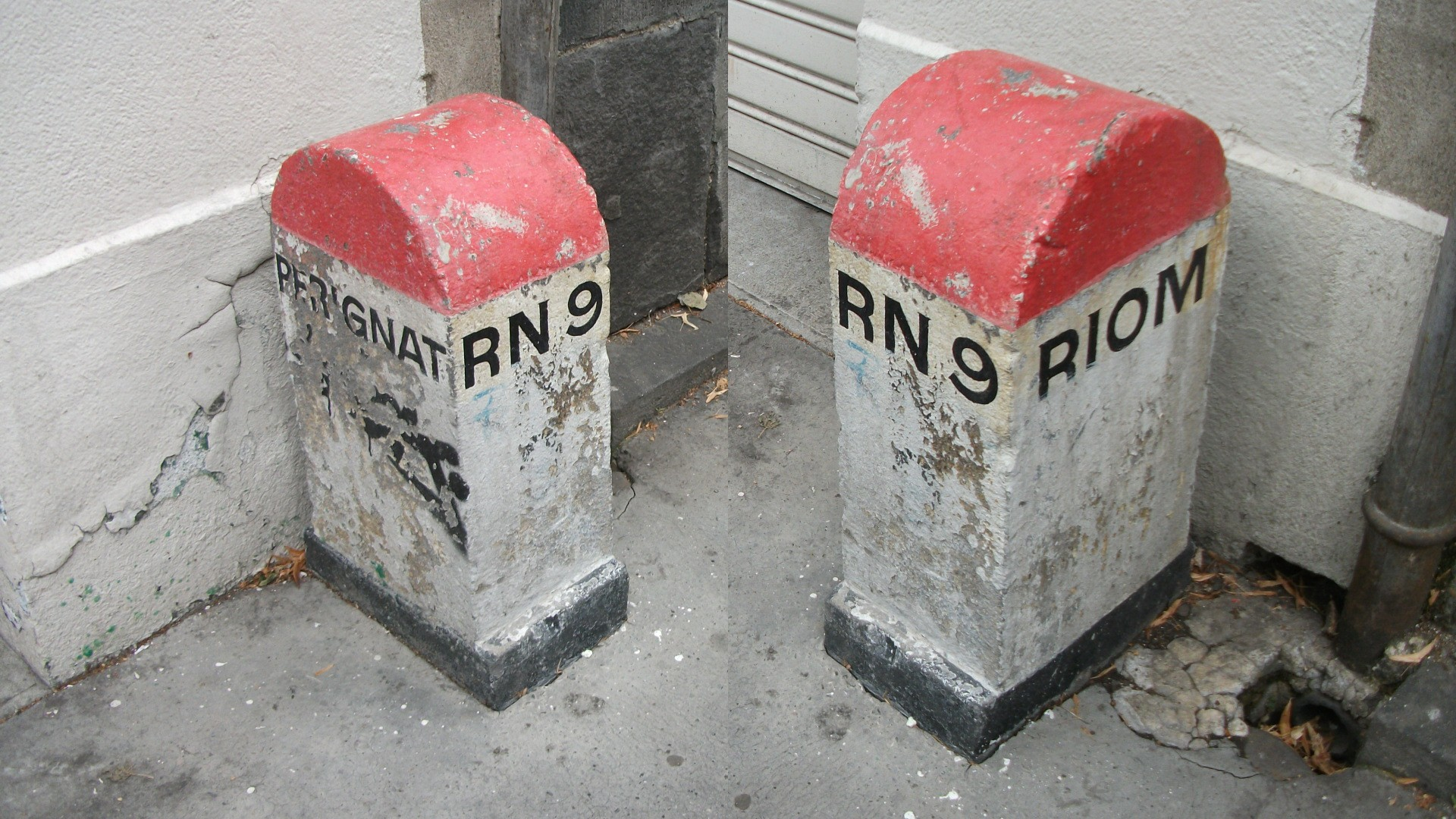
Double-face milestone in Clermont-Ferrand.

The Route nationale 9, or RN 9, is a route nationale in France between Moulins and the border with Spain across 591 kilometres.

== Reclassification ==
Much of the N9 has now been upgraded or replaced by the A75 autoroute; in particular the section south of Clermont-Ferrand to Béziers. Depending on which Department the road is in, the old road is now numbered as various Route Départementale numbers:

- RD 2009 in Allier and Puy-de-Dôme. (with some exceptions like RD 2019 in Aigueperse, RD 2029 in Riom, RD 2099 in south-eastern Clermont-Ferrand)
- RD 978 From Pèrignat-lès-Sarilève to exit 6 of the A75.
- RD 797 From exit 6 of the A75 to Coudes.
- RD 716 In Issoire
- RD 909 From Le Broc to Lozère,
- RD 809 In Lozère and Aveyron
- RD 609 In Hérault
- RD 6009 In Aude
- RD 900 In Pyrénées-Orientales

== Route Description ==
Moulins - Clermont-Ferrand - Béziers - Narbonne - Perpignan - Spain

=== Moulins to Clermont Ferrand (0 km to 103 km) ===
The road begins in Moulins at a junction with the N7 on the Rue de l'Horloge. The road weaves through the city and crosses the Allier river across the Pont Régemortes. The road follows the West bank of Allier to Saint-Pourçain-sur-Sioule crossing the Sioule river and following it South. At Gannat the road meets the A719, which connects Vichy, 20km to the East, and the A71 autoroute. The N9 continues South to Riom and the volcanic region of Auvergne. The road is dual-carriageway for 10km into the industrial city of Clermont-Ferrand.

=== Clermont Ferrand to Béziers (103 km to 444 km) ===
After Clermont-Ferrand the road heads through the Massif Central countryside. Much of the N9 has now been upgraded or replaced by the A75 autoroute between Clermont-Ferrand and Béziers.

The original N9 has now been renumbered D909 and passes through small villages and towns bypassed by the A75 which now takes the majority of through traffic. The route follows the upper Allier valley to Issoire before joining the Gorges de l'Allagnon and then climbing to cross the Col de la Fageole (1114m) and onto Saint-Flour and the Gorges de l’Ander. The old N9 then follows the banks of the dammed river Truyère under the Viaduc de Garabit.

The surroundings are very scenic consisting of rolling green wooded hills and steep sided river vallies, as the road is now crossing the edge of the Aubrac plateau. The road has a junction with the old N106, now D806 at Saint-Chély-d'Apcher. The road then crosses the Col des Issartets (1121m), the highest point of the road, after which the former route of the N9 passes to the East of the autoroute passing through the small town of Marvejols and into the Lot valley.

The road then enters Causse country a series of barren limestone plateaus divided by deep river valleys. The road passes between the Causse de Sévérac and Causse de Sauveterre before reaching Sévérac-le-Château and the N88 which heads to the West.

The road passes the source of the Aveyron and into the Parc Natural Régional des Grandes Causses. After crossing the Col d'Engayresque (888m) the N9 re-appears and drops into the Gorges du Tarn and onto Millau where the road crosses the river and climbs up to the Causse du Larzac offering views of the valley and viaduct. The N9 provides a free alternative for avoiding the toll on the A75 as it crosses the valley on the Viaduc de Millau. The N9 has again been replaced by the A75 for this section.

At the Pas de l'Escalette just South of Le Caylar the road enters a gorge leading South off the Causse du Larzac and on toward the coastal plain and the Mediterranean. Historically, the N9 used to cross the river Lergue at Pegairolles de l'Escalette and follow what is now the treacherous D149 right through the city of Lodève. After a series of improvements starting in 1969, the road now stays on the left bank of the Lergue and bypasses Lodève. It skirts the Lac du Salagou, which it once ran right through, before reaching Clermont l'Hérault and a junction with the N109 to Montpellier. The N9 demerges from the A75 autoroute again at Clermont-l'Hérault, and follows the Hérault Valley south through Pézenas. The roads run parallel to each other until just to the North-East of Béziers when the A75 turns South-East to intersect the A9 autoroute.

=== Béziers to Perthus (444 km to 591 km) ===
After Béziers the A9 autoroute runs parallel to the route of the N9 and takes the majority of through traffic from Béziers. There the road crosses the Canal du Midi and river Orb and continues over the river Aude to Narbonne. The section south of Béziers is reclassified as the D6009. Thereafter the road heads along the Étang de Bages et de Sigean as the mountains push further East. The road is overlooked here by the Massif de Fontfroide and thereafter heads through the vineyards of Fitou. The road passes round the shores of the Étang de Leucate ou de Salses.

The road enters Northern Catalonia at the Fort de Salses. The road is downgraded to D900 and passes through the plain of Roussillon to the city of Perpignan where it crosses the rivers Têt and Tech. The plain is dominated by the Pyrénées to the South and the Corbières Massif to North. It then passes Le Boulou where it enters the Monts Albères which form the Eastern ridge of the Pyrénées. The road climbs to the border at Le Perthus and the Col du Perthus where the road enters Spain, in the village of Els Límits. The road continues as the N-II in Spain.

== History ==
The route was initially conceived by Napoleon as part of the 1811 Route Impériale system as Route Impériale 10. It was defined as: "The road between Paris and Perpignan". After Napoleon’s downfall it was renamed to Route Royale 9. It was finally changed to Route Nationale 9 after France became a republic. The route has stayed the same for the most part, with minor changes and upgrades made over time.

Throughout the 20th century, the N9 has built up somewhat of a negative reputation. The road was narrow, rough, and extremely accident prone due to the extensive mountain sections. Widening or upgrading the road was difficult due to the equally difficult to work with terrain. Starting in the 1960's, studies were launched in order to improve the N9 in the Massif Central. It started small, a few expressways near Clermont-Ferrand and the Lodève bypass in the late 60's. In 1969, the treacherous section North of Lodève, now known as the D149 was bypassed. In 1978, most of the Pas de l'Escalette was reworked into dual-carriageway. Most of these sections would later end up as part of the A75. As the A75 was being built, the N9 quickly lost most of its use and was gradually downgraded as more parts of the A75 opened. In 1992, most of the section between Clermont-Ferrand and Béziers was downgraded, and later in 2006, almost the entire remaining section was downgraded. All that's left of the N9 today is a small section in Massiac spanning 2 kilometres.
