= Col de la Fageole =

Mountain pass in France

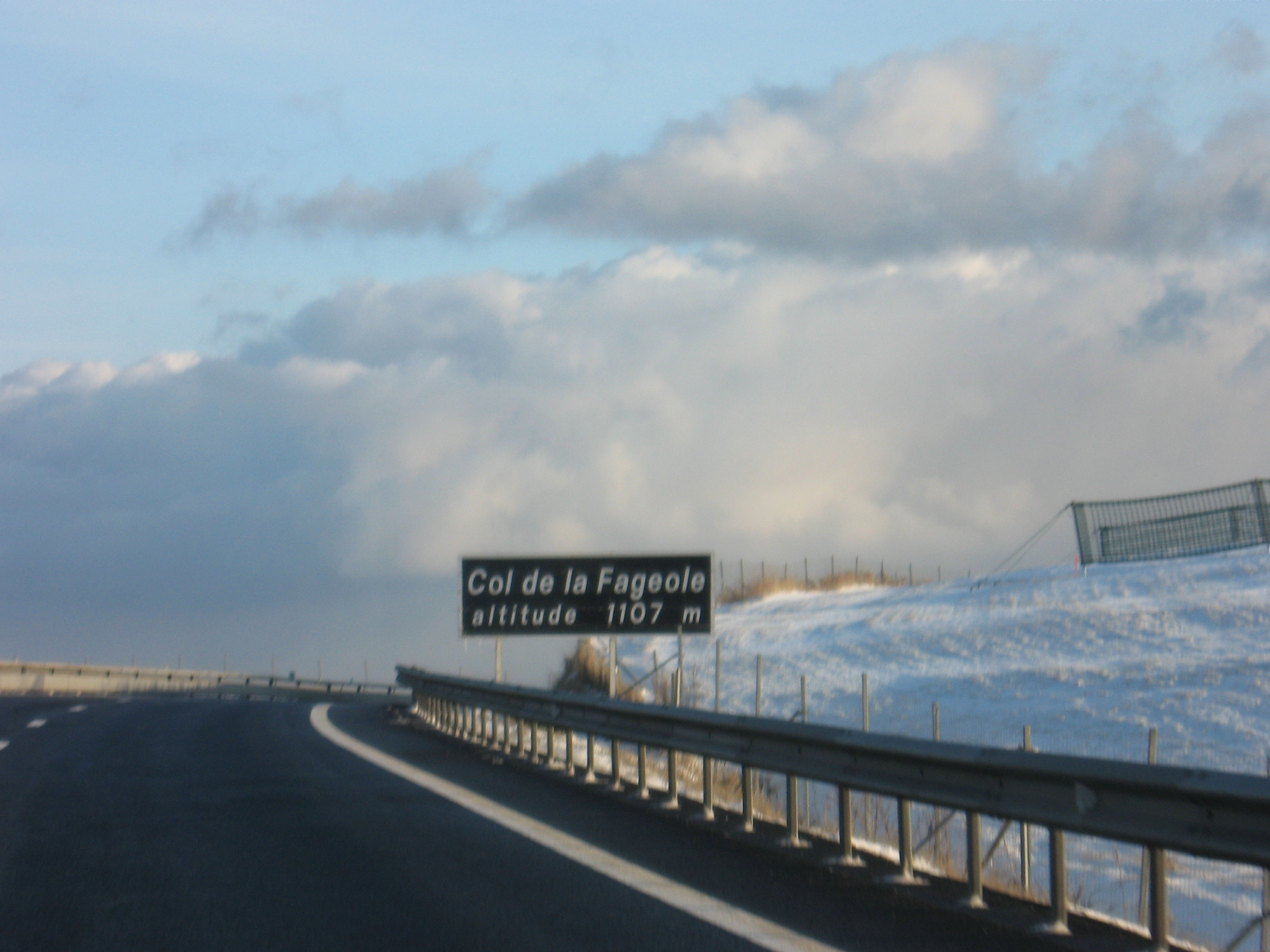
- Passage through the Col de la Fageole at 1,107 meters on the A75.

- Location within France
- Elevation: 1,114 metres (3,655 ft)
- Traversed by: A75 autoroute, Route nationale 9

Third Approach
- Location: Cantal, France
- Range: Margeride (Massif Central)
- Coordinates: 45°06′04″N 03°07′41″E

The Col de la Fageole is a mountain pass in the Massif Central, located in the Auvergne-Rhône-Alpes region, in the department of Cantal.

== Toponymy ==
The name Fageole comes from the Occitan diminutive faja, which becomes fajòla, meaning "small beech wood."

== History ==
This pass, part of the road from Saint-Flour to Massiac, was used to travel from the South to the North of France through the Cantal region. Due to frequent snow whirlwinds in winter, indicator poles had been installed along the road.

== Geography ==
=== Location ===
The Col de la Fageole is situated in the municipality of Coren, at an altitude of 1,114 meters. It is accessible from the A75 motorway.

A wind farm is located nearby.

=== Climate ===
This pass is feared in winter as the ascent can become difficult due to frequent snowfalls from late autumn until May. Snowdrift barriers have been installed there.
