= Col des Issartets =

Mountain pass in France

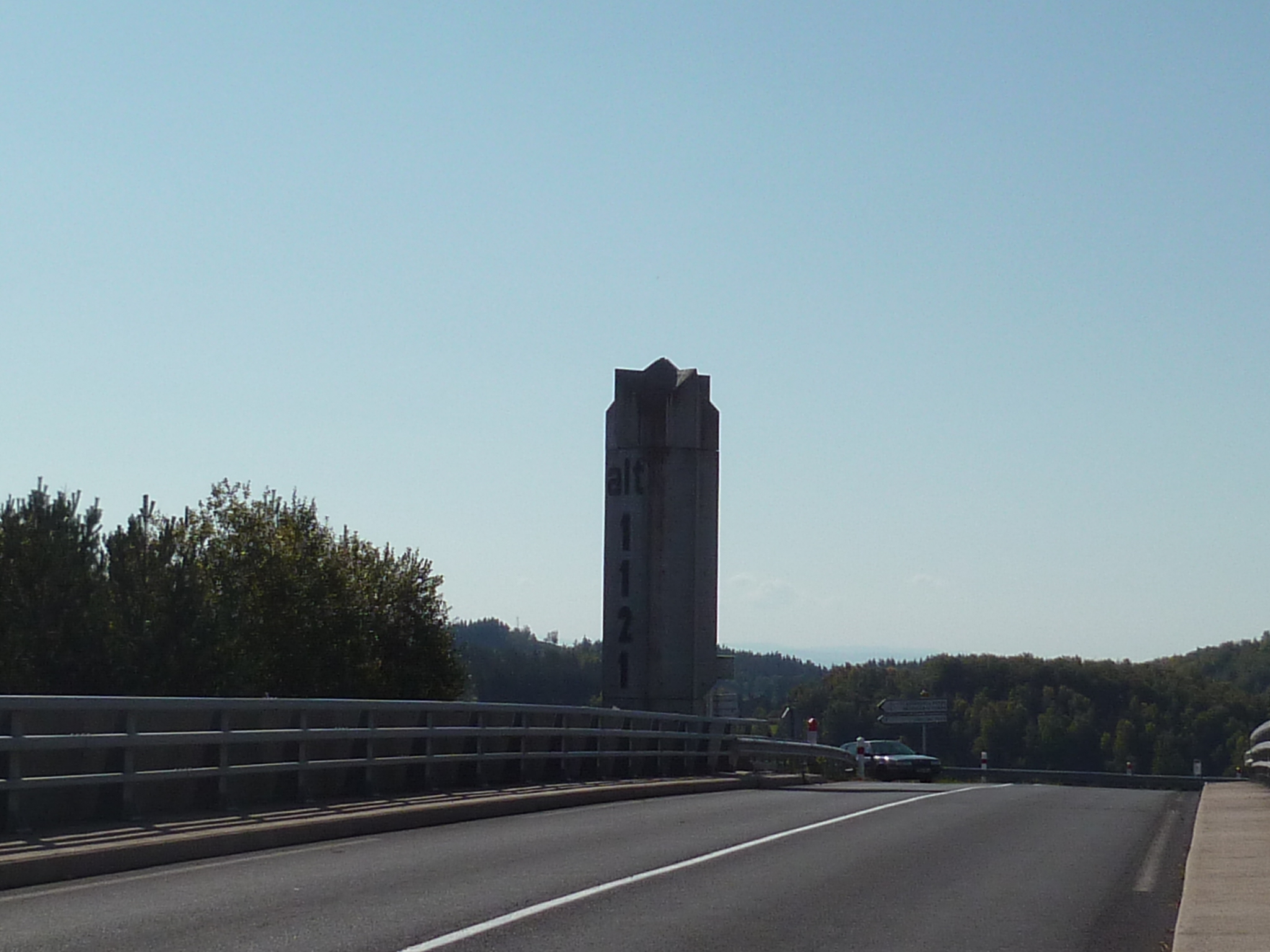
- Marker at the Col des Issartets at the intersection between the motorway and the departmental road.

- Location within France
- Elevation: 1,123 metres (3,684 ft)
- Traversed by: D 53, D 809, A 75

Third Approach
- Location: Lozère department, France
- Range: Aubrac (Massif Central)
- Coordinates: 44°38′57″N 03°14′52″E

The Col des Issartets is a mountain pass, both a road and a motorway pass, located in the Massif Central on the Aubrac plateau, in the department of Lozère. This pass on the A75 motorway reaches an altitude of 1,123 meters (1,125 meters for the departmental road passing over the bridge), making it the highest motorway pass in France.

== Geography ==
The pass marks the administrative boundary between the municipalities of Sainte-Colombe-de-Peyre to the north and Le Buisson to the south. It is located not far from Lac du Moulinet, a highly frequented water recreation area in the Marvejols region.

== See also ==
- List of highest paved roads in Europe
