= Saint-Germain-Lembron =

- Commune
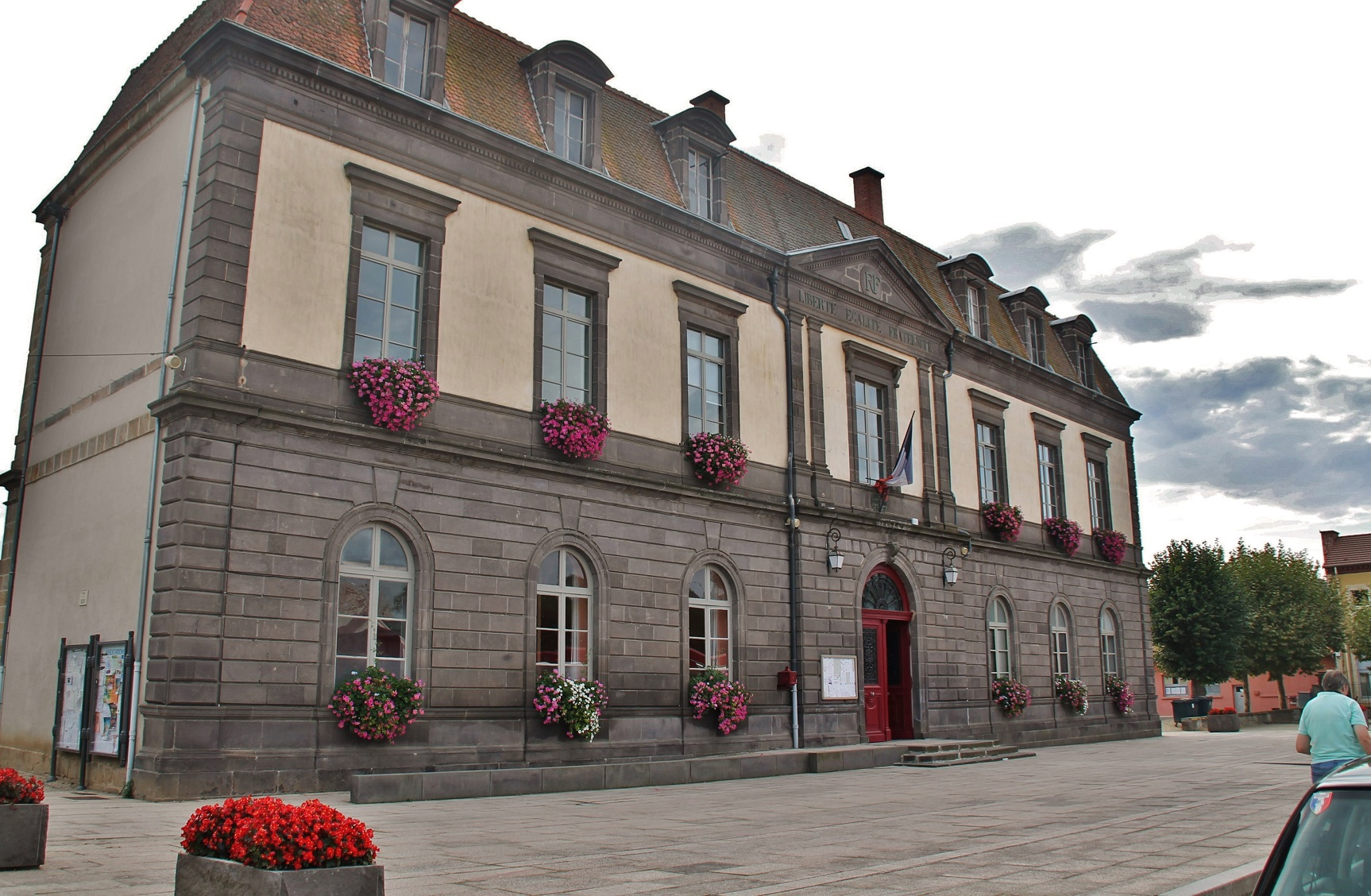
- The town hall in Saint-Germain-Lembron

- Coat of arms
- Location of Saint-Germain-Lembron
- Location within France Location within Auvergne-Rhône-Alpes
- Coordinates: 45°27′29″N 3°14′24″E
- Country: France
- Region: Auvergne-Rhône-Alpes
- Department: Puy-de-Dôme
- Arrondissement: Issoire
- Canton: Brassac-les-Mines
- Intercommunality: Agglo Pays d'Issoire

Government
  - Mayor (2026–32): Graziella Brunetti
- Area^{1}: 15.7 km^{2} (6.1 sq mi)
- Elevation: 394 m (1,293 ft)
- Highest elevation: 544 m (1,785 ft)
- Lowest elevation: 397 m (1,302 ft)
- Population (2023): 2,031
  - Density: 129/km^{2} (335/sq mi)
- Time zone: UTC+01:00 (CET)
  - Summer (DST): UTC+02:00 (CEST)
- INSEE/Postal code: 63352 /63340
- ^{1} French Land Register data, which excludes lakes, ponds, glaciers > 1 km^{2} (0.386 sq mi or 247 acres) and river estuaries.

Saint-Germain-Lembron (French pronunciation: [sɛ̃ ʒɛʁmɛ̃ lɑ̃bʁɔ̃]; Occitan: Sant German de Lembron) is a commune in the Puy-de-Dôme department in the Auvergne-Rhône-Alpes region in central France.

== Geography ==
The village of Saint-Germain-Lembron is located in an alluvial basin crossed by a small stream : the Lembronnais. That's what it Lembron from the suffix added to the name of Saint-Germain.

The heart of the village is situated off the highway A75 near the river Couze Ardes which flows into the Allier some two kilometers downstream on the territory of the neighboring town of Breuil-sur-Couze.

== History ==
The history of Saint-Germain-Lembron dates back to Gallo-Roman times when a town designated as the Liziniat (Liziniacus) appearing in some ancient writings, the latter being located on-site or near the present village. One of three churches dedicated to St. Germain was built here and, the town was home to a community of canons from the second half of the 10th century, finally gave its name to the town, as already attested to the Merovingian vicus.

From the 14th century, Saint-Germain-Lembron ranks among the thirteen good towns of Lower Auvergne.

During the revolutionary period of the National Convention (1792-1795), the town took the name of Liziniac-Lembron.

== Politics ==
- March 2001 March 2008 Anne-Marie Stebernjak
- March 2008 March 2014 René Roux
- March 2014 In progress Graziella Brunetti LG left Party

== Population ==
Historical population
Year	Pop.	±% p.a.
1968	1,720	—
1975	1,661	−0.50%
1982	1,646	−0.13%
1990	1,671	+0.19%
1999	1,623	−0.32%
2007	1,730	+0.80%
2012	1,881	+1.69%
2017	1,980	+1.03%
2023	2,031	+0.42%
Source: INSEE

== See also ==
- Communes of the Puy-de-Dôme department
