= Ardes =

- Commune
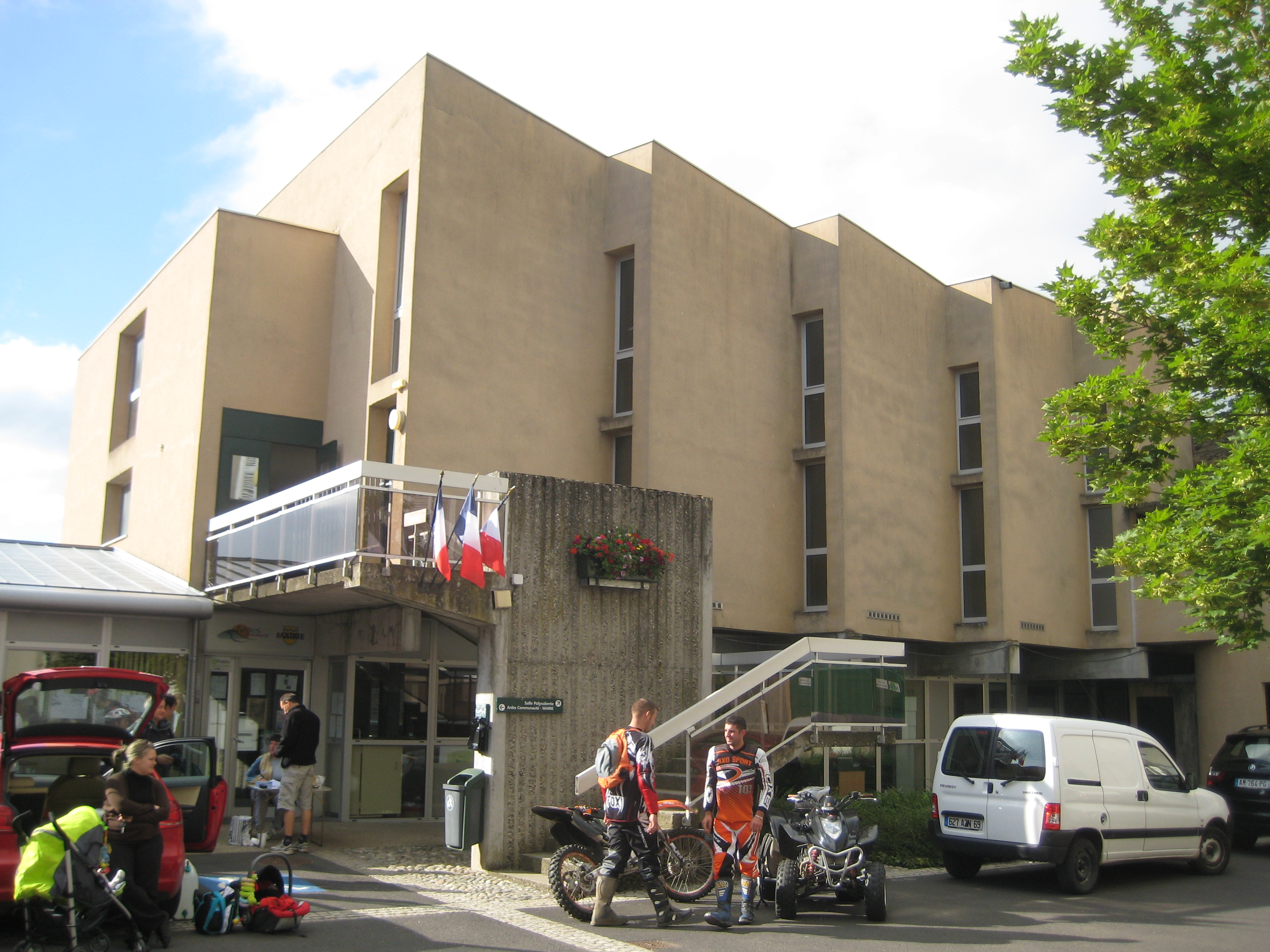
- The town hall in Ardes

- Coat of arms
- Location of Ardes
- Location within France Location within Auvergne-Rhône-Alpes
- Coordinates: 45°24′16″N 3°07′38″E
- Country: France
- Region: Auvergne-Rhône-Alpes
- Department: Puy-de-Dôme
- Arrondissement: Issoire
- Canton: Brassac-les-Mines
- Intercommunality: Agglo Pays d'Issoire

Government
  - Mayor (2026–32): Jacques Therme
- Area^{1}: 16.59 km^{2} (6.41 sq mi)
- Elevation: 630 m (2,070 ft)
- Highest elevation: 1,039 m (3,409 ft)
- Lowest elevation: 485 m (1,591 ft)
- Population (2023): 592
  - Density: 35.7/km^{2} (92.4/sq mi)
- Time zone: UTC+01:00 (CET)
  - Summer (DST): UTC+02:00 (CEST)
- INSEE/Postal code: 63009 /63420
- ^{1} French Land Register data, which excludes lakes, ponds, glaciers > 1 km^{2} (0.386 sq mi or 247 acres) and river estuaries.

Ardes (French pronunciation: [aʁd]; Auvergnat: Ardes de Cosa) is a commune in the Puy-de-Dôme department in Auvergne-Rhône-Alpes in central France. It is in the canton of Brassac-les-Mines.

== Population ==
Historical population

Year	Pop.	±% p.a.
1881	1,394	—
1962	807	−0.67%
1968	812	+0.10%
1975	747	−1.18%
1982	643	−2.12%
1990	585	−1.17%

Year	Pop.	±% p.a.
1999	547	−0.74%
2007	599	+1.14%
2012	550	−1.69%
2017	561	+0.40%
2023	592	+0.90%

Source: EHESS and INSEE

== Heritage ==
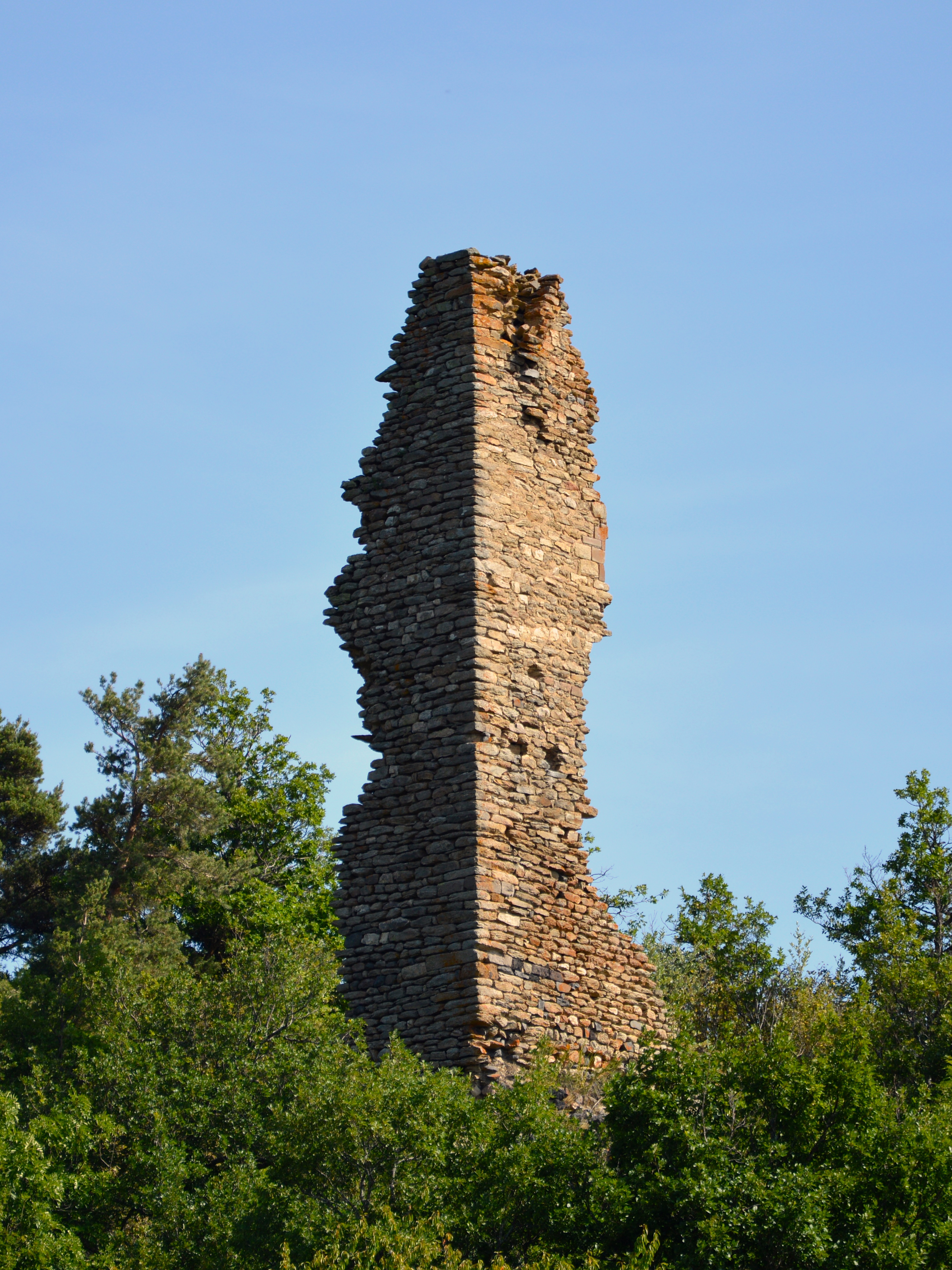
Doigt de Mercœur, a ruined donjon near Ardes.

- The Doigt de Mercœur, the remains of a hilltop castle near Ardes.
- The 14th century church of Saint-Dizaint

== See also ==
- Communes of the Puy-de-Dôme department
