= Jumeaux =

- Commune
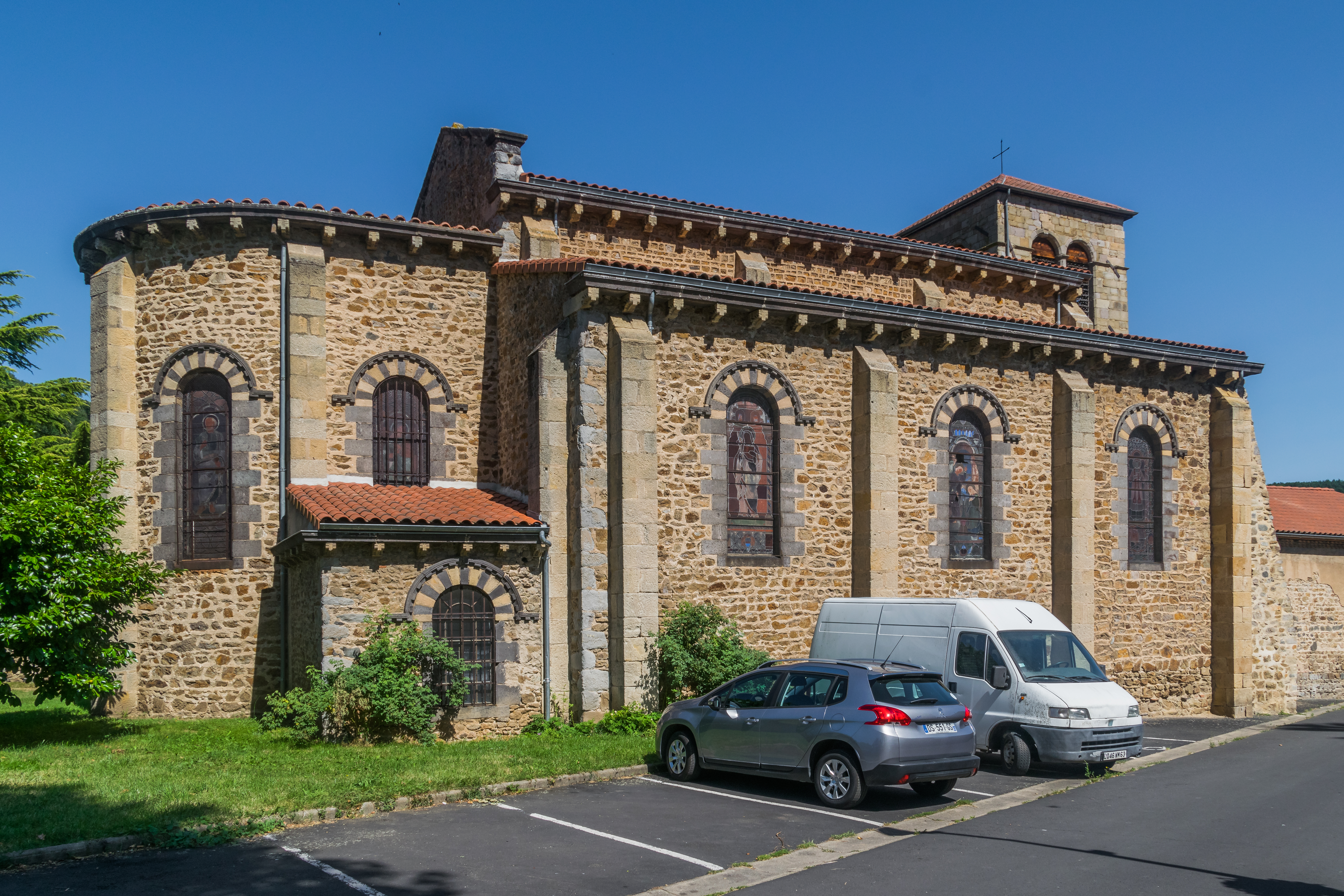
- The church in Jumeaux

- Coat of arms
- Location of Jumeaux
- Location within France Location within Auvergne-Rhône-Alpes
- Coordinates: 45°25′55″N 3°20′27″E
- Country: France
- Region: Auvergne-Rhône-Alpes
- Department: Puy-de-Dôme
- Arrondissement: Issoire
- Canton: Brassac-les-Mines
- Intercommunality: Agglo Pays d'Issoire

Government
  - Mayor (2026–32): Stéphane Meteignier
- Area^{1}: 7.13 km^{2} (2.75 sq mi)
- Elevation: 400 m (1,300 ft)
- Highest elevation: 730 m (2,400 ft)
- Lowest elevation: 393 m (1,289 ft)
- Population (2023): 559
  - Density: 78.4/km^{2} (203/sq mi)
- Time zone: UTC+01:00 (CET)
  - Summer (DST): UTC+02:00 (CEST)
- INSEE/Postal code: 63182 /63570
- ^{1} French Land Register data, which excludes lakes, ponds, glaciers > 1 km^{2} (0.386 sq mi or 247 acres) and river estuaries.

Jumeaux (French pronunciation: [ʒymo]) is a commune in the Puy-de-Dôme department in Auvergne in central France.

== See also ==
- Communes of the Puy-de-Dôme department
