= Le Breuil-sur-Couze =

- Commune
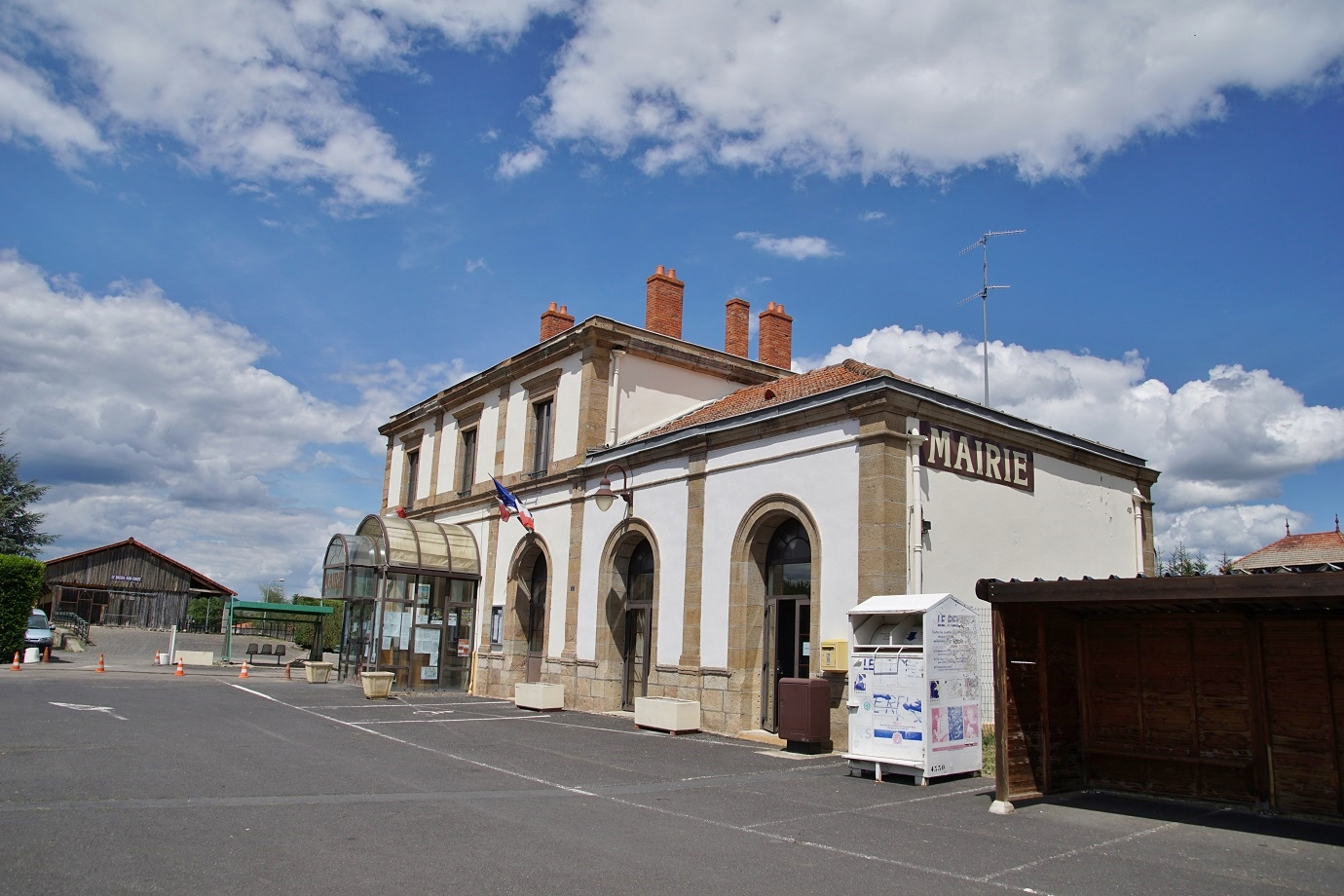
- Town hall
- Location of Le Breuil-sur-Couze
- Location within France Location within Auvergne-Rhône-Alpes
- Coordinates: 45°28′10″N 3°15′49″E
- Country: France
- Region: Auvergne-Rhône-Alpes
- Department: Puy-de-Dôme
- Arrondissement: Issoire
- Canton: Brassac-les-Mines
- Intercommunality: Agglo Pays d'Issoire

Government
  - Mayor (2020–2026): Gilles Sabatier
- Area^{1}: 5.94 km^{2} (2.29 sq mi)
- Elevation: 394 m (1,293 ft)
- Highest elevation: 490 m (1,610 ft)
- Lowest elevation: 387 m (1,270 ft)
- Population (2023): 1,028
  - Density: 173/km^{2} (448/sq mi)
- Time zone: UTC+01:00 (CET)
  - Summer (DST): UTC+02:00 (CEST)
- INSEE/Postal code: 63052 /63340
- ^{1} French Land Register data, which excludes lakes, ponds, glaciers > 1 km^{2} (0.386 sq mi or 247 acres) and river estuaries.

Le Breuil-sur-Couze (French pronunciation: [lə bʁœj syʁ kuz]; Occitan: Lo Bruelh) is a commune in the Puy-de-Dôme department in Auvergne-Rhône-Alpes in central France.

== Population ==
Historical population
Year	Pop.	±% p.a.
1968	758	—
1975	842	+1.51%
1982	875	+0.55%
1990	820	−0.81%
1999	868	+0.63%
2007	943	+1.04%
2012	1,018	+1.54%
2017	1,046	+0.54%
2023	1,028	−0.29%
Source: INSEE

== See also ==
- Communes of the Puy-de-Dôme department
