= Ceyras =

- Commune
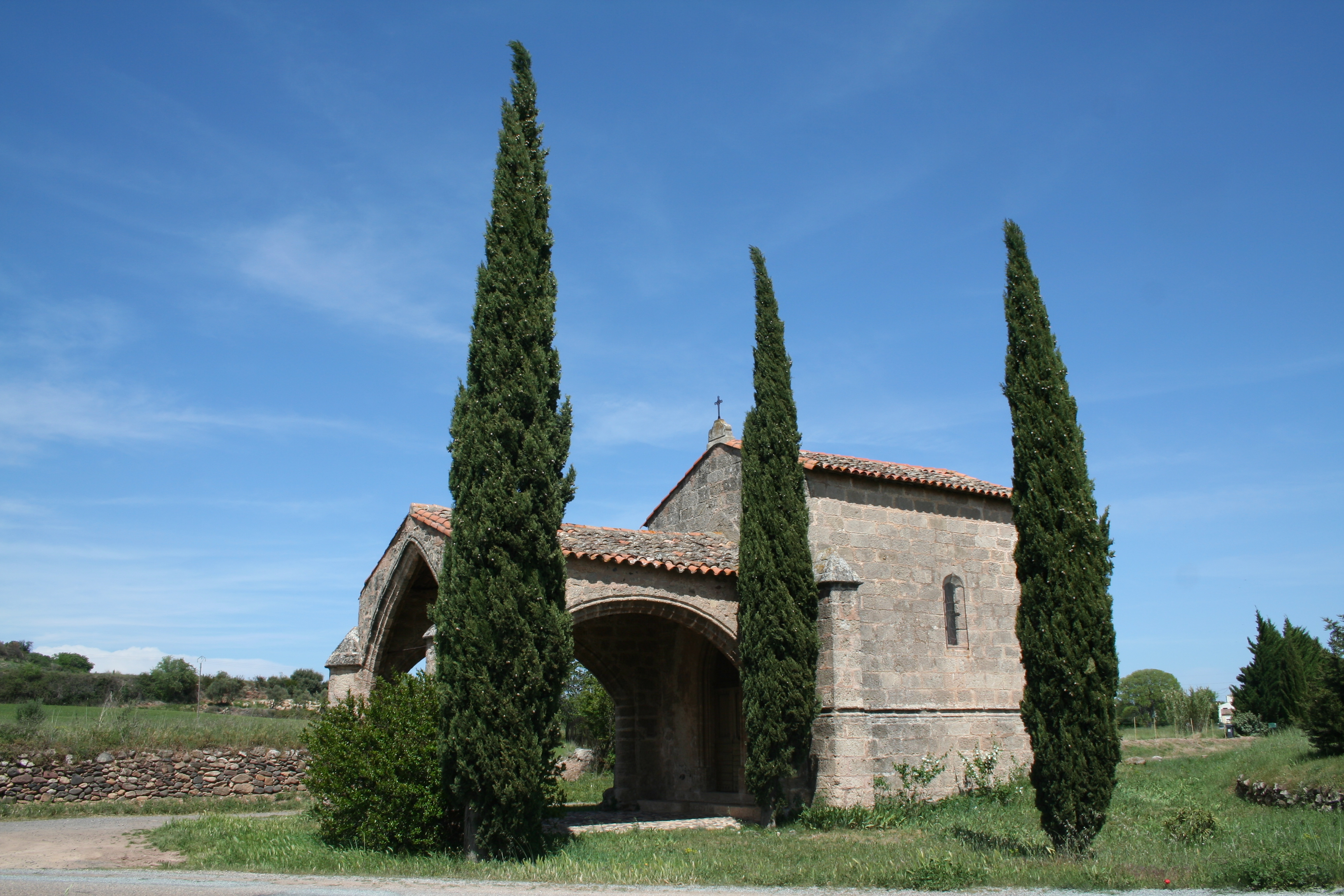
- N-Dame Hortus

- Coat of arms
- Location of Ceyras
- Location within France Location within Occitanie
- Coordinates: 43°38′43″N 3°27′33″E
- Country: France
- Region: Occitania
- Department: Hérault
- Arrondissement: Lodève
- Canton: Clermont-l'Hérault
- Intercommunality: Clermontais

Government
  - Mayor (2020–2026): Jean-Claude Lacroix
- Area^{1}: 6.96 km^{2} (2.69 sq mi)
- Elevation: 65 m (213 ft)
- Highest elevation: 152 m (499 ft)
- Lowest elevation: 39 m (128 ft)
- Population (2023): 1,404
  - Density: 202/km^{2} (522/sq mi)
- Time zone: UTC+01:00 (CET)
  - Summer (DST): UTC+02:00 (CEST)
- INSEE/Postal code: 34076 /34800
- ^{1} French Land Register data, which excludes lakes, ponds, glaciers > 1 km^{2} (0.386 sq mi or 247 acres) and river estuaries.

Ceyras (Ceiràs in Occitan) is a commune in the Hérault department in southern France.

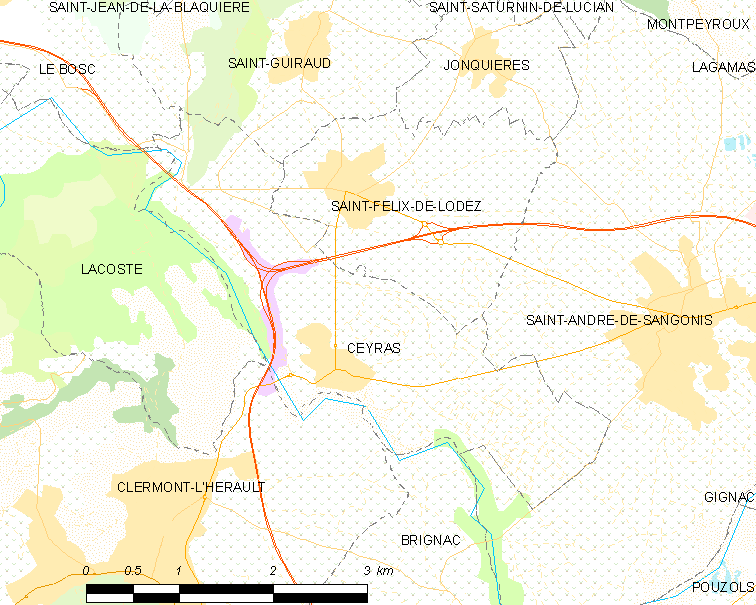
Map

== Population ==
Historical population
Year	Pop.	±% p.a.
1968	503	—
1975	513	+0.28%
1982	602	+2.31%
1990	681	+1.55%
1999	725	+0.70%
2007	951	+3.45%
2012	1,254	+5.69%
2017	1,396	+2.17%
2023	1,404	+0.10%
Source: INSEE

== See also ==
- Communes of the Hérault department
