= Lac du Moulinet =

Lake in France

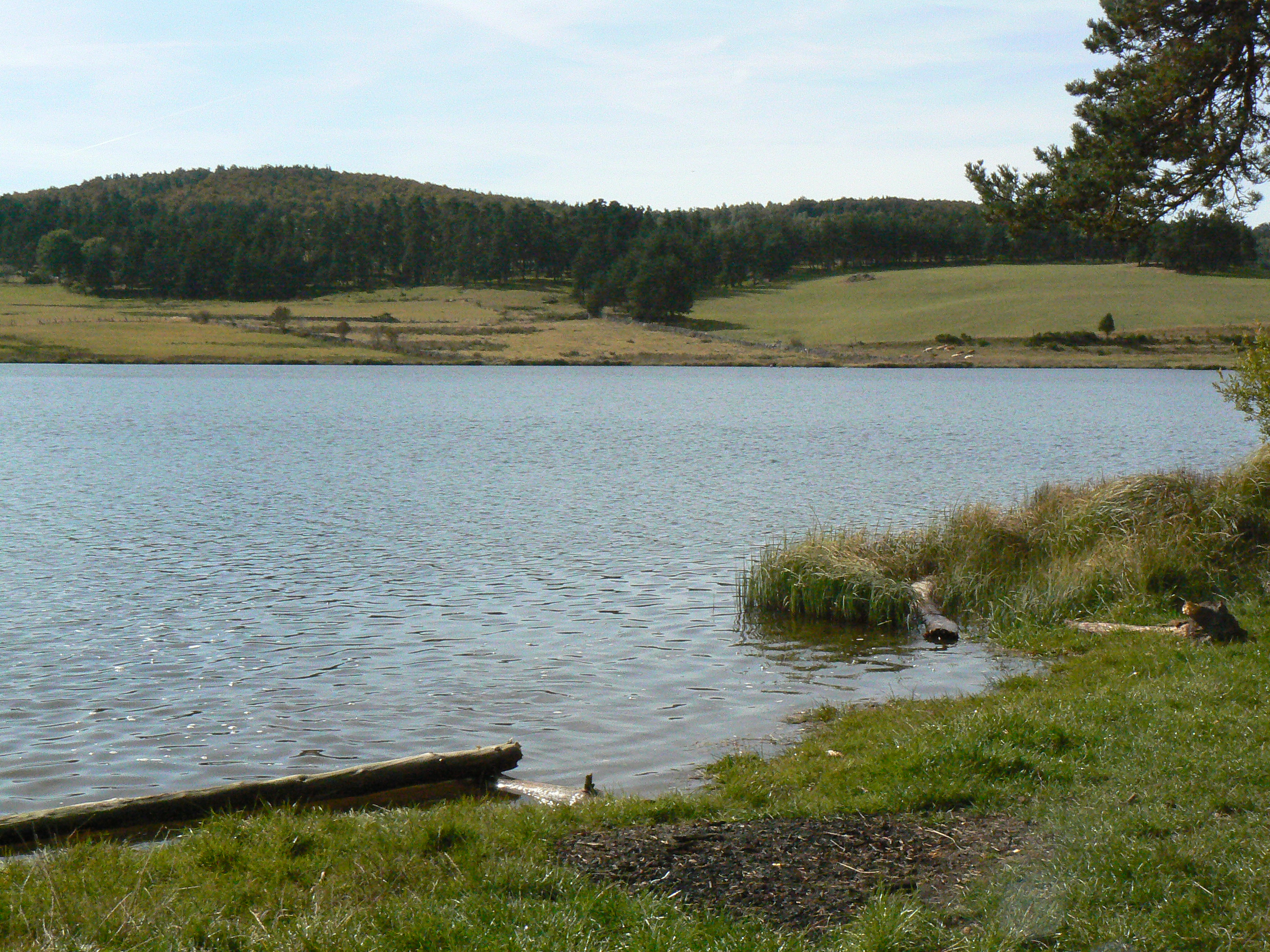

- Location within France
- Location: Lozère
- Coordinates: 44°38′32″N 03°13′57″E
- Type: artificial
- Primary inflows: Crueize
- Basin countries: France
- Surface area: 0.13 km^{2} (0.050 sq mi)
- Water volume: 390,000 m^{3} (14,000,000 cu ft)
- Surface elevation: 1,075 m (3,527 ft)
- Islands: none

Lac du Moulinet is a lake in Lozère, France. At an elevation of 1075 m, its surface area is 0.13 km².
