= Saint-Jean-de-la-Blaquière =

- Commune
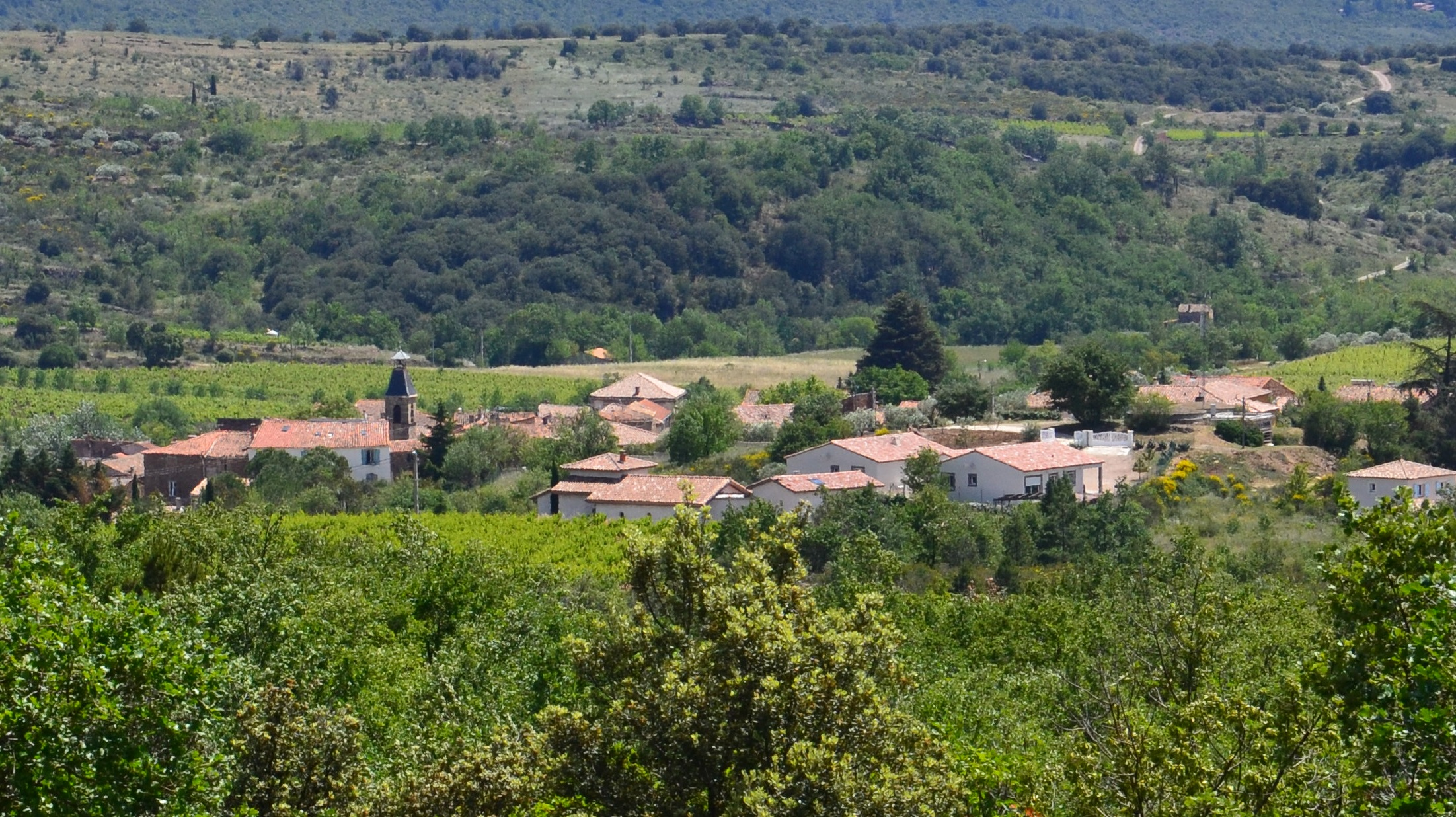
- A general view of Saint-Jean-de-la-Blaquière

- Coat of arms
- Location of Saint-Jean-de-la-Blaquière
- Location within France Location within Occitanie
- Coordinates: 43°42′57″N 3°25′25″E
- Country: France
- Region: Occitania
- Department: Hérault
- Arrondissement: Lodève
- Canton: Lodève
- Intercommunality: Lodévois-Larzac

Government
  - Mayor (2020–2026): Bernard Jahnich
- Area^{1}: 17.22 km^{2} (6.65 sq mi)
- Elevation: 115 m (377 ft)
- Highest elevation: 557 m (1,827 ft)
- Lowest elevation: 85 m (279 ft)
- Population (2023): 698
  - Density: 40.5/km^{2} (105/sq mi)
- Time zone: UTC+01:00 (CET)
  - Summer (DST): UTC+02:00 (CEST)
- INSEE/Postal code: 34268 /34700
- ^{1} French Land Register data, which excludes lakes, ponds, glaciers > 1 km^{2} (0.386 sq mi or 247 acres) and river estuaries.

Saint-Jean-de-la-Blaquière (French pronunciation: [sɛ̃ ʒɑ̃ də la blakjɛʁ]; Languedocien: Sant Joan de la Blaquièira) is a commune in the Hérault department in the Occitanie region in southern France.

== Population ==
Historical population
Year	Pop.	±% p.a.
1968	300	—
1975	259	−2.08%
1982	263	+0.22%
1990	338	+3.19%
1999	361	+0.73%
2007	496	+4.05%
2012	624	+4.70%
2017	627	+0.10%
2023	698	+1.80%
Source: INSEE

== See also ==
- Communes of the Hérault department
