= Coren, Cantal =

Commune in Auvergne-Rhône-Alpes, France

Coren
- Commune
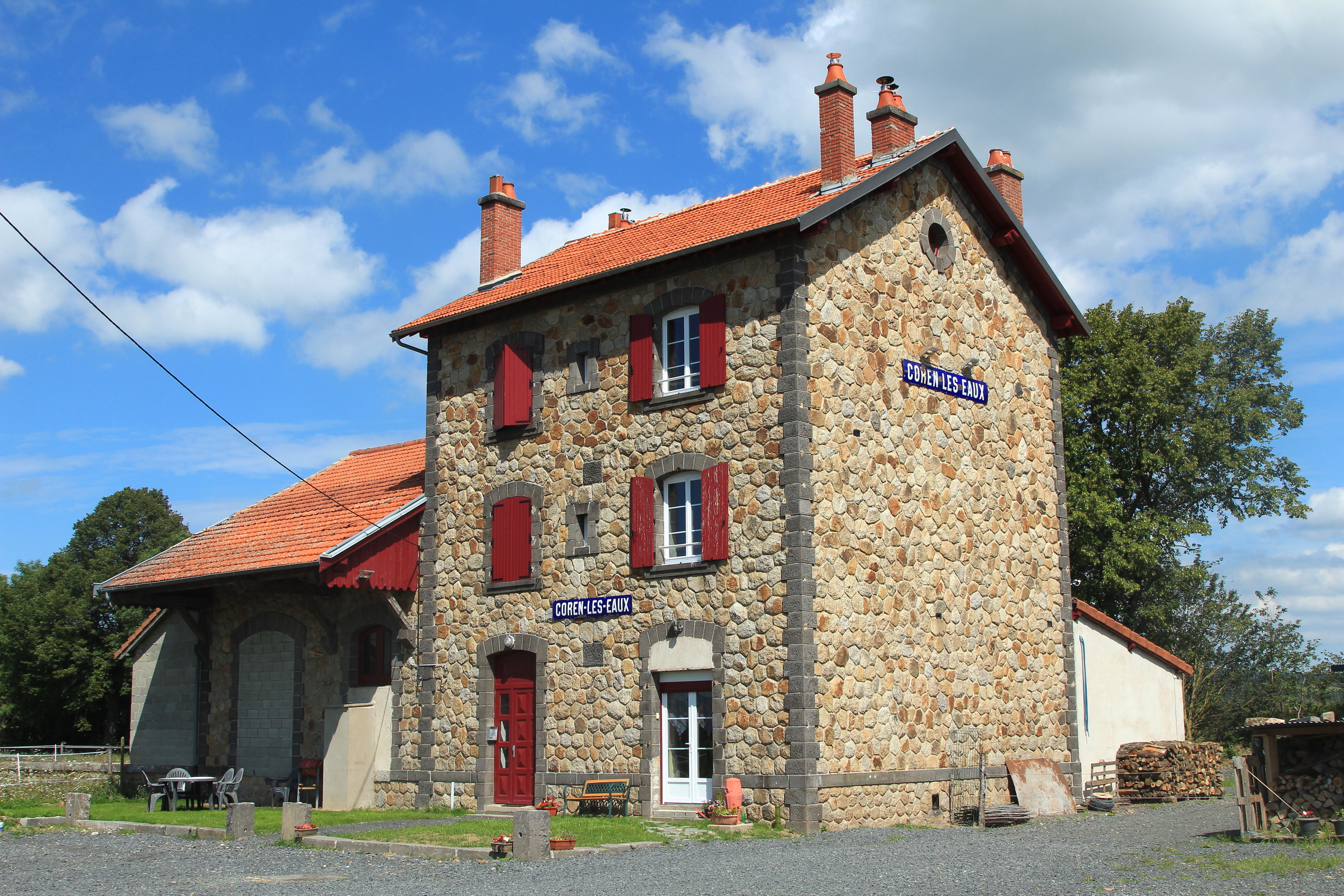
- The old railway station building in Coren-les-Eaux
- Location of Coren
- Location within France Location within Auvergne-Rhône-Alpes
- Coordinates: 45°04′41″N 3°06′29″E
- Country: France
- Region: Auvergne-Rhône-Alpes
- Department: Cantal
- Arrondissement: Saint-Flour
- Canton: Saint-Flour-1
- Intercommunality: Saint-Flour Communauté

Government
  - Mayor (2020–2026): Patricia Roches
- Area^{1}: 16.86 km^{2} (6.51 sq mi)
- Elevation: 930 m (3,050 ft)
- Highest elevation: 1,153 m (3,783 ft)
- Lowest elevation: 854 m (2,802 ft)
- Population (2023): 445
  - Density: 26.4/km^{2} (68.4/sq mi)
- Time zone: UTC+01:00 (CET)
  - Summer (DST): UTC+02:00 (CEST)
- INSEE/Postal code: 15055 /15100
- ^{1} French Land Register data, which excludes lakes, ponds, glaciers > 1 km^{2} (0.386 sq mi or 247 acres) and river estuaries.

Coren is a commune in the Cantal department in south-central France.

== Population ==
Historical population
Year	Pop.	±% p.a.
1968	262	—
1975	276	+0.75%
1982	401	+5.48%
1990	419	+0.55%
1999	407	−0.32%
2007	437	+0.89%
2012	417	−0.93%
2017	434	+0.80%
2023	445	+0.42%
Source: INSEE

== See also ==
- Communes of the Cantal department
