= Le Caylar =

- Commune
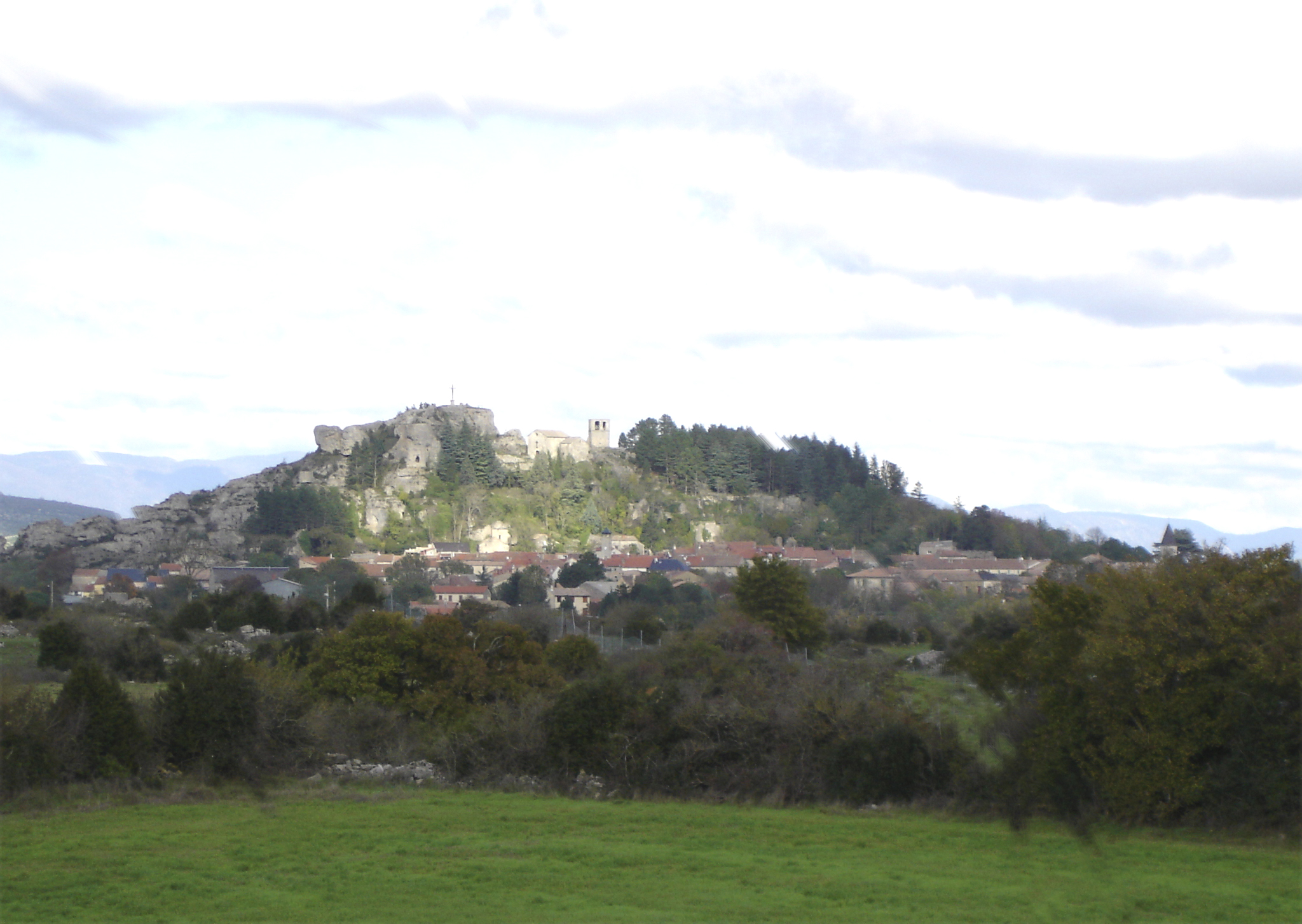
- A general view of Le Caylar

- Coat of arms
- Location of Le Caylar
- Location within France Location within Occitanie
- Coordinates: 43°51′50″N 3°19′11″E
- Country: France
- Region: Occitania
- Department: Hérault
- Arrondissement: Lodève
- Canton: Lodève
- Intercommunality: Lodévois - Larzac

Government
  - Mayor (2020–2026): Jean Trinquier
- Area^{1}: 22.08 km^{2} (8.53 sq mi)
- Elevation: 752 m (2,467 ft)
- Highest elevation: 826 m (2,710 ft)
- Lowest elevation: 714 m (2,343 ft)
- Population (2023): 460
  - Density: 21/km^{2} (54/sq mi)
- Time zone: UTC+01:00 (CET)
  - Summer (DST): UTC+02:00 (CEST)
- INSEE/Postal code: 34064 /34520
- ^{1} French Land Register data, which excludes lakes, ponds, glaciers > 1 km^{2} (0.386 sq mi or 247 acres) and river estuaries.

Le Caylar (French pronunciation: [lə kɛlaʁ]; Occitan: Lo Cailar), also known as Le Caylar-en-Larzac, is a commune in the Hérault department in southern France, in the administrative region of Occitanie. It has the Village étape label since 2013.

== Geography ==
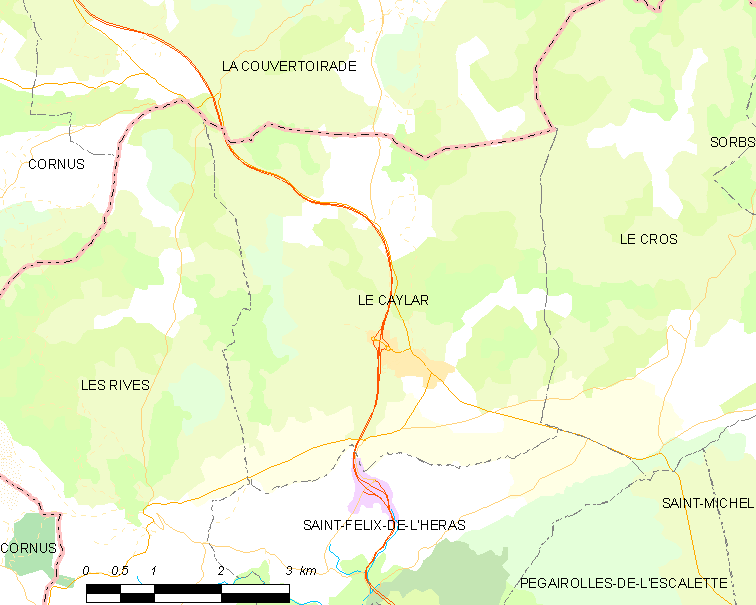
Map

Le Caylar is situated 71 km from Montpellier and 18 km from Lodève. The village is situated on the limestone karst plateau of Larzac.

The climate is very dry there, cold in winter and rather hot in summer.

The rocks consist of limestones: calcium carbonate (CaCO_{3}) or dolomite: double carbonate of calcium and magnesium (CaMg (CO_{3})_{2}). The first gives very lapiazed reliefs. The second is less soluble than the first, resulting in irregular reliefs.

== Toponymy ==
Le is a French definite article equivalent to the in English. Caylar is an old meridional word meaning castle. Therefore, Le Caylar means The Castle.

The long form of the commune, Le-Caylar-en-Larzac, means The castle in Larzac, Larzac being the name of the plateau the commune is situated on.

== History ==
The first traces of occupation of the site date back to the Iron Age. Carolingian houses (before the 10th century) can still be seen in the village.

The Roc Castel, which overlooks the village of Caylar, constitutes the remains of the Castellas (castle) originally built in the 12th century. The Notre-Dame du Roc Castel chapel, still housed there, also dates from the 12th century.

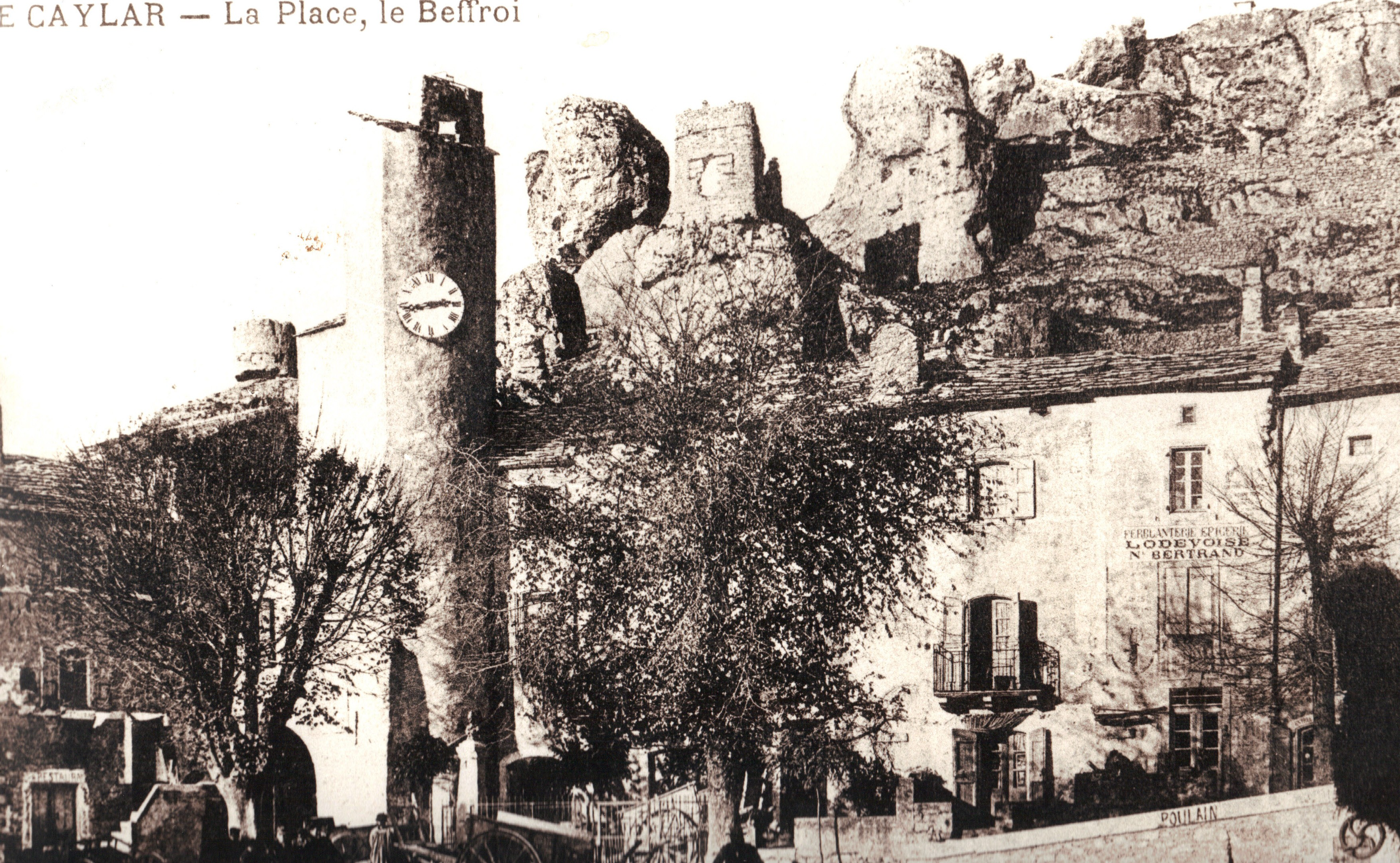
Town in the beginning of the 20th.

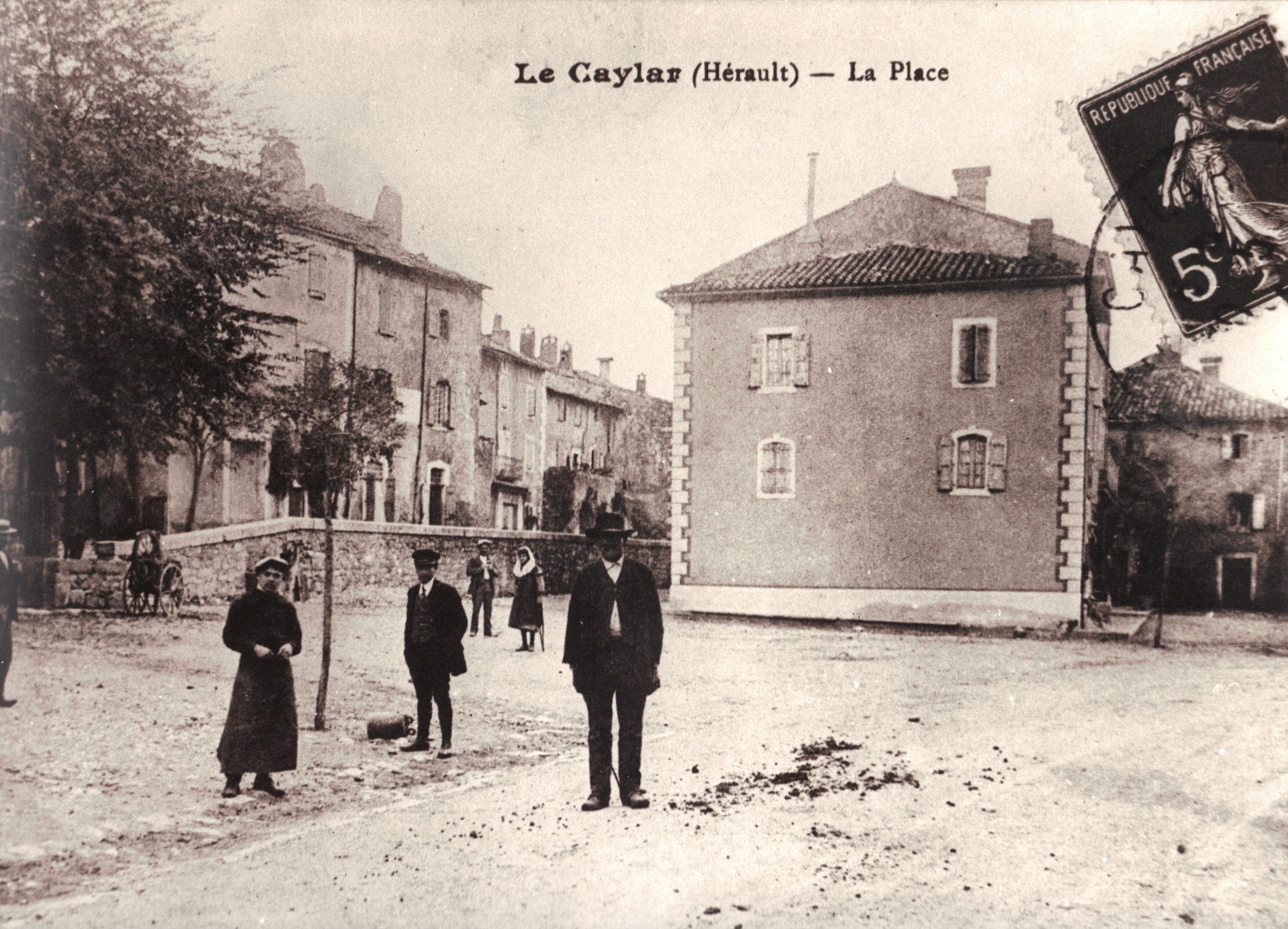
Town in the beginning of the 20th.

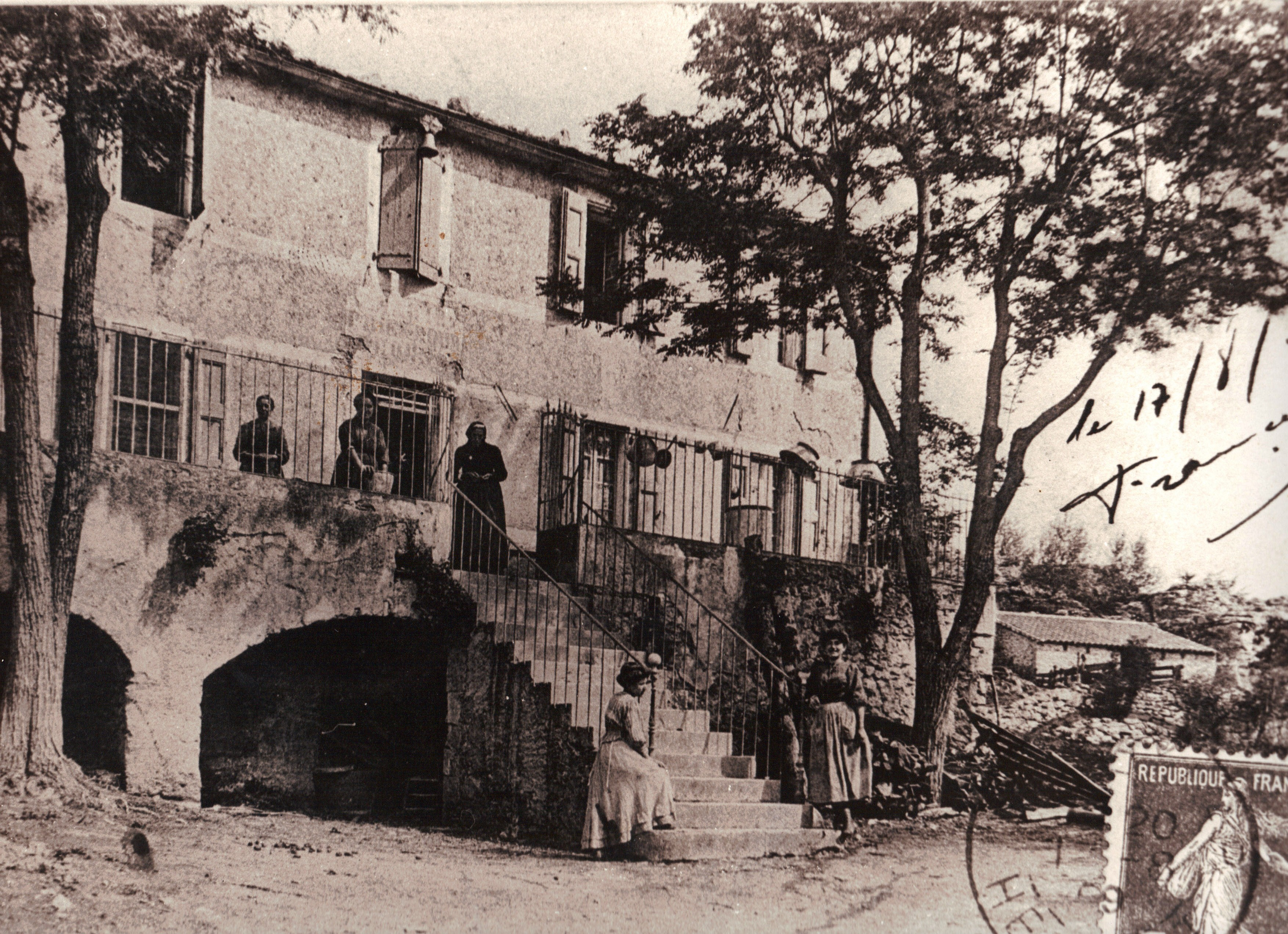
The camp Lauriet in the beginning of the 20th.

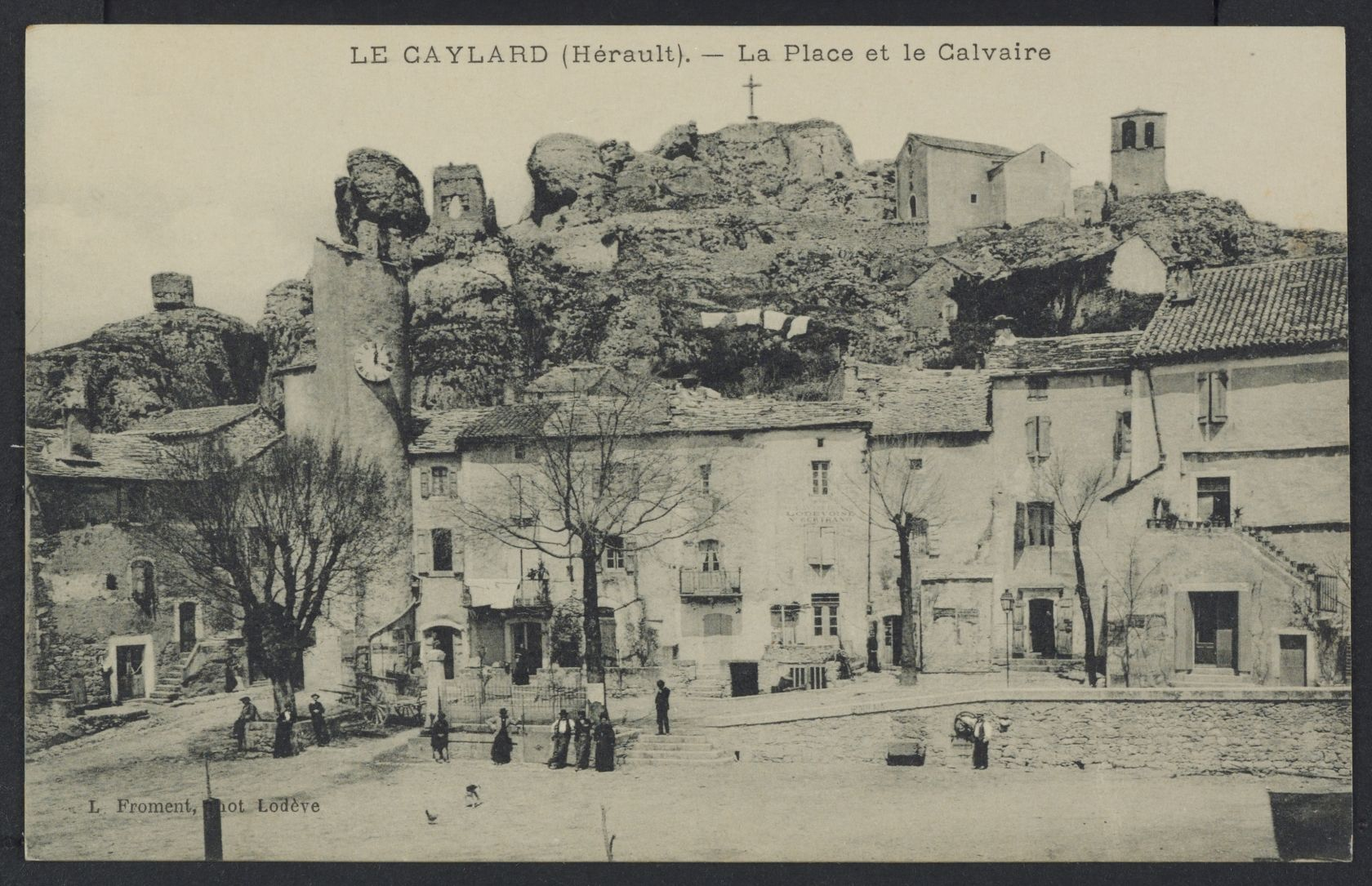
Postal card of the place and the calvary (end 19th - early 20th).

== Population ==
Historical population
| Year | Pop. | ±% p.a. |
|---|---|---|
| 1968 | 327 | — |
| 1975 | 259 | −3.28% |
| 1982 | 295 | +1.88% |
| 1990 | 339 | +1.75% |
| 1999 | 383 | +1.37% |
| 2007 | 434 | +1.57% |
| 2012 | 438 | +0.18% |
| 2017 | 445 | +0.32% |
| 2023 | 460 | +0.55% |
Source: INSEE

== Monuments ==
- Notre-Dame Chapel. Wood retable from the 14th century.
- The Sculpted Tree (Arbre sculpté in French).
- Roc Castel. This rock dominates the village (altitude 752 meters), offering a valuable panorama on the Larzac.
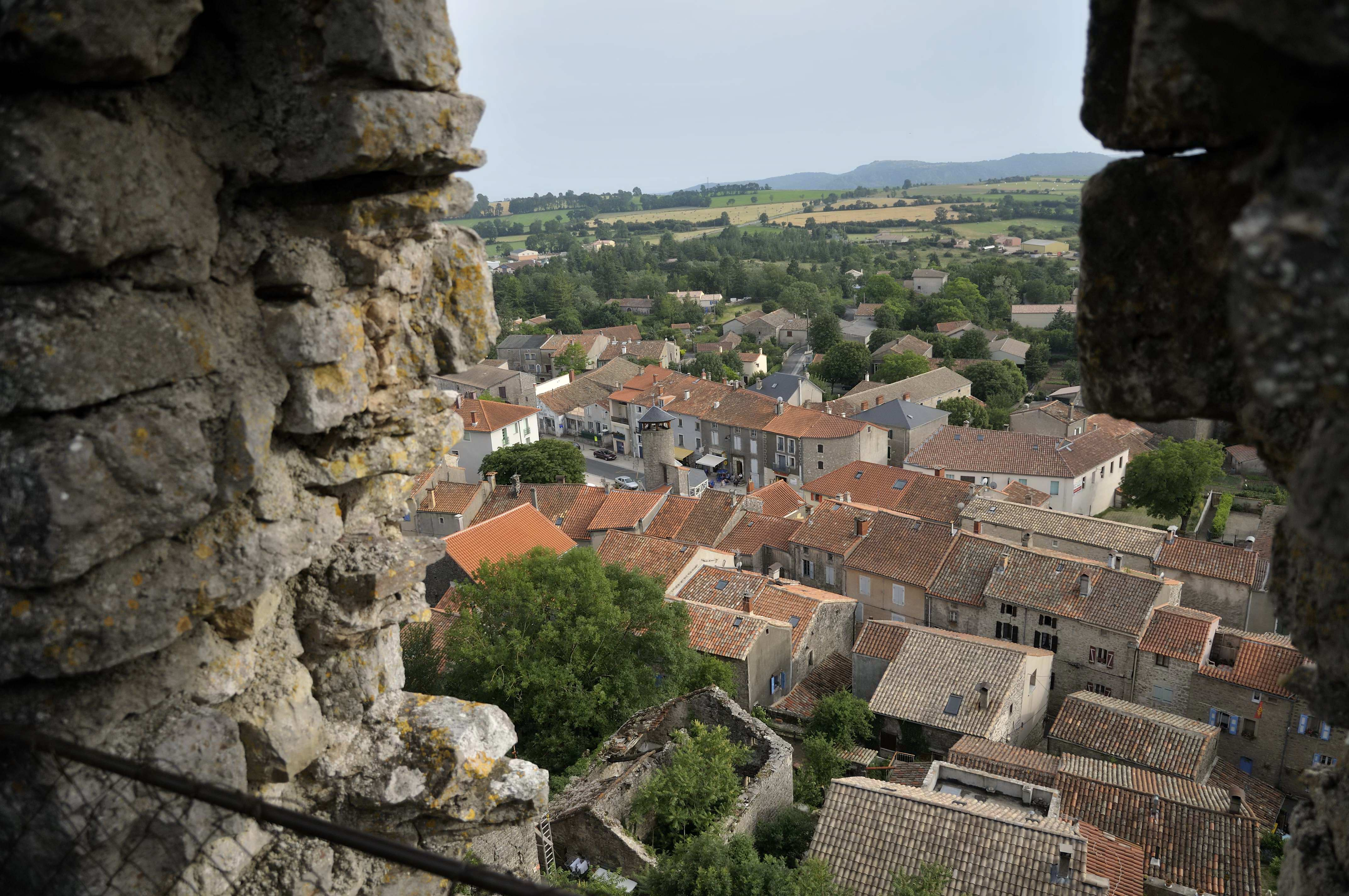
View of the castle.

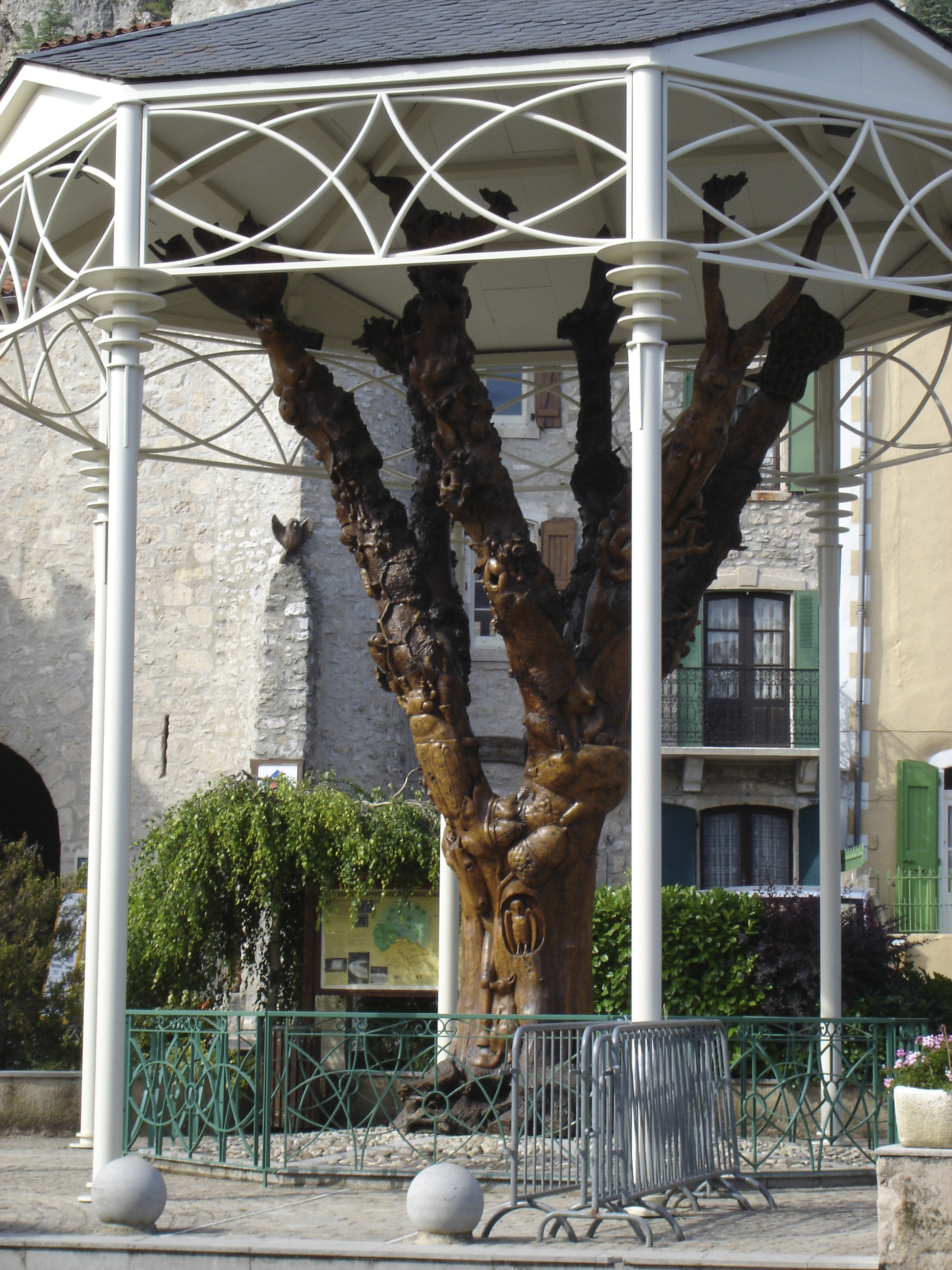
The Sculpted Tree.

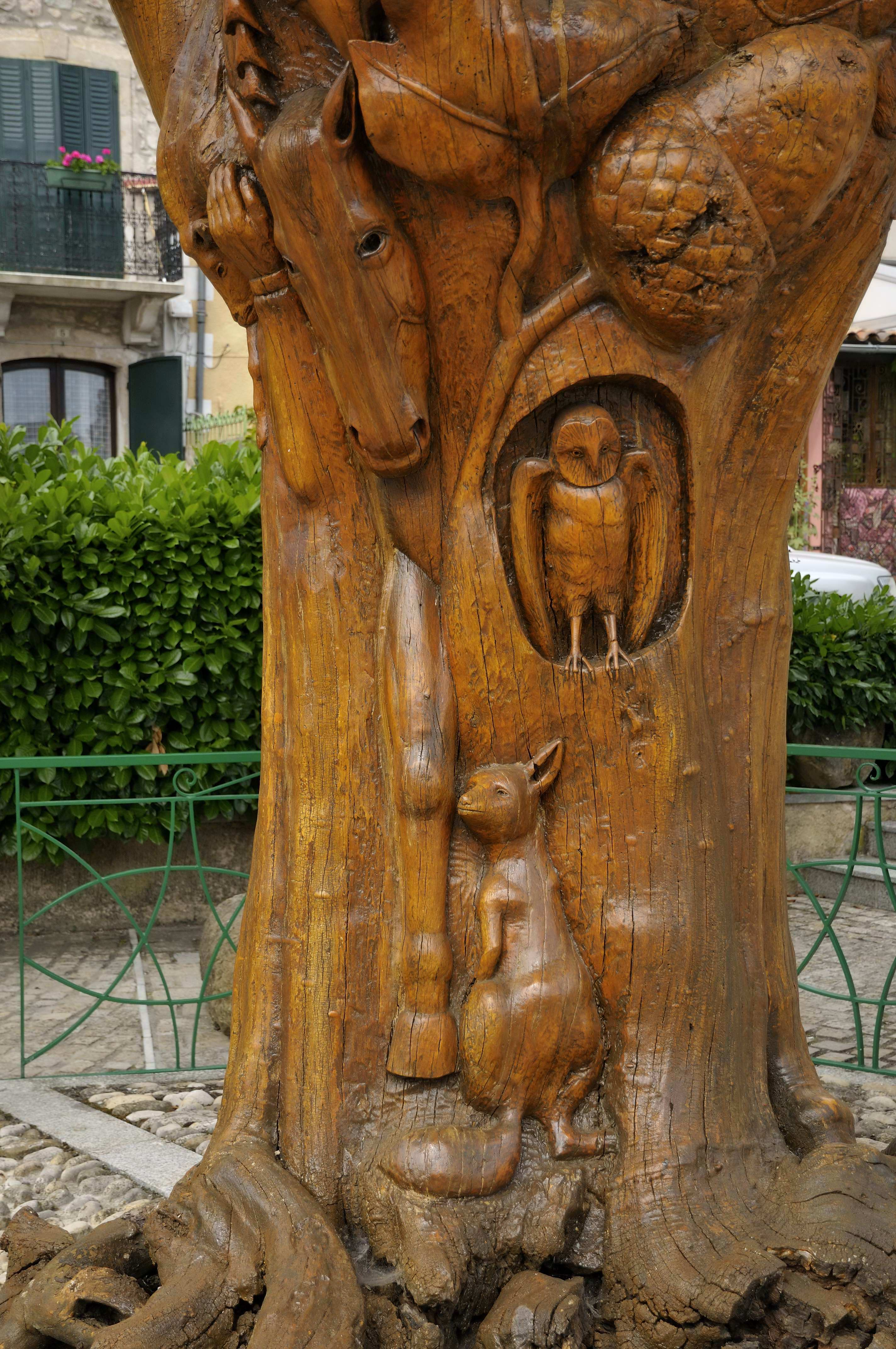
Detail of the sculpted tree.

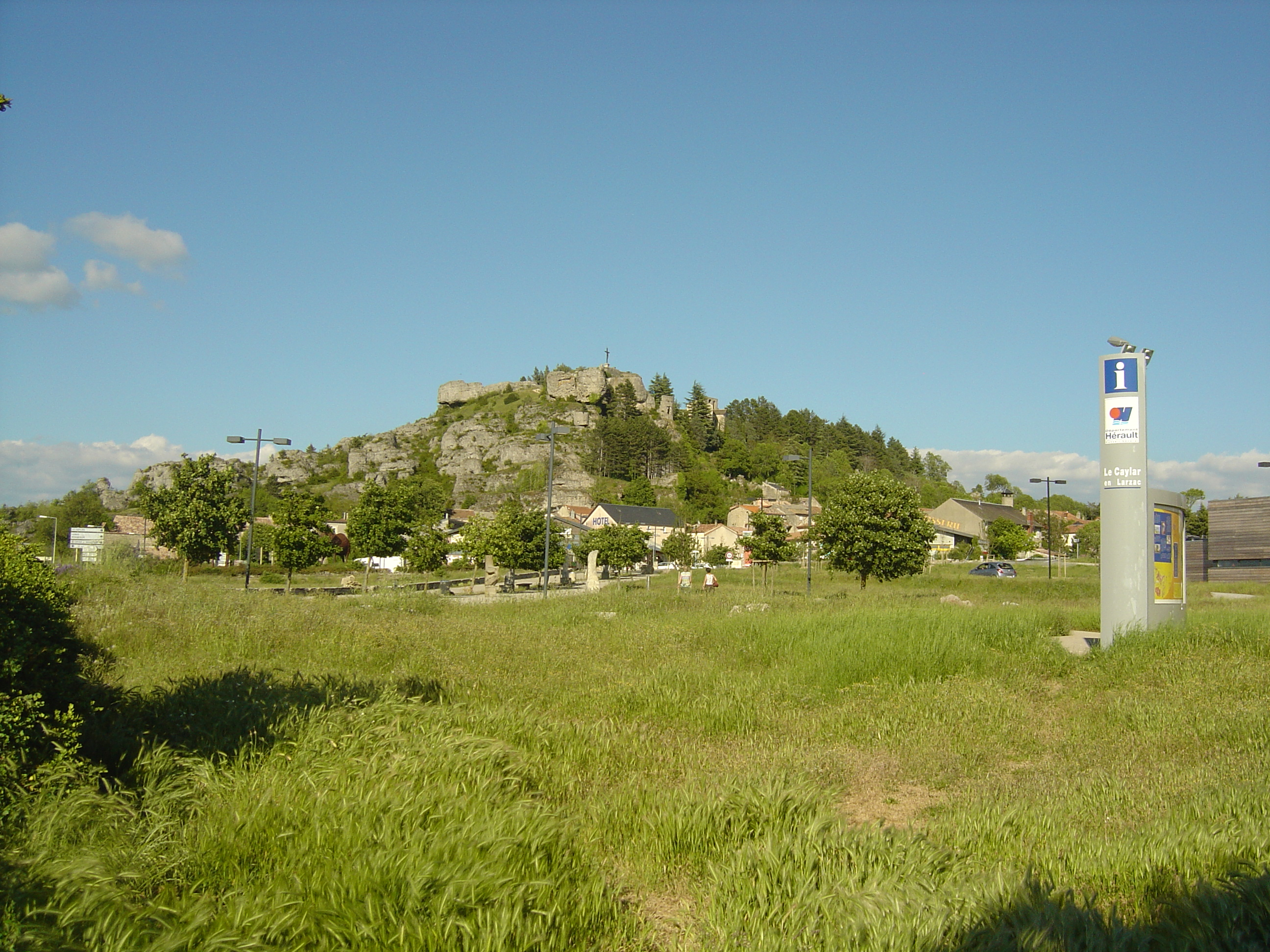
The Roc Castel viewed from the A75.

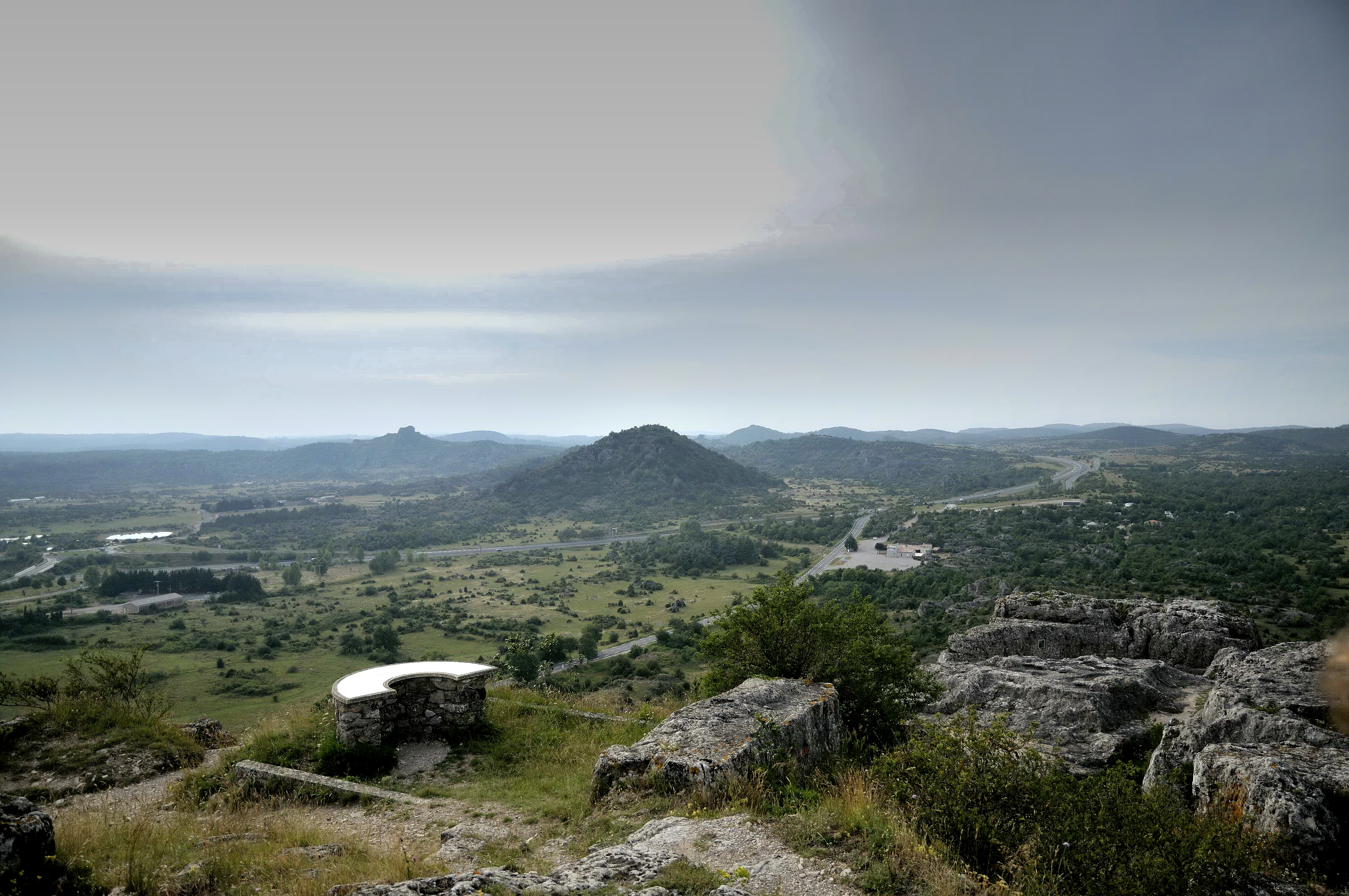
View from the roc castel on the Larzac.

== See also ==
- Communes of the Hérault department
