= Coudes =

- Commune
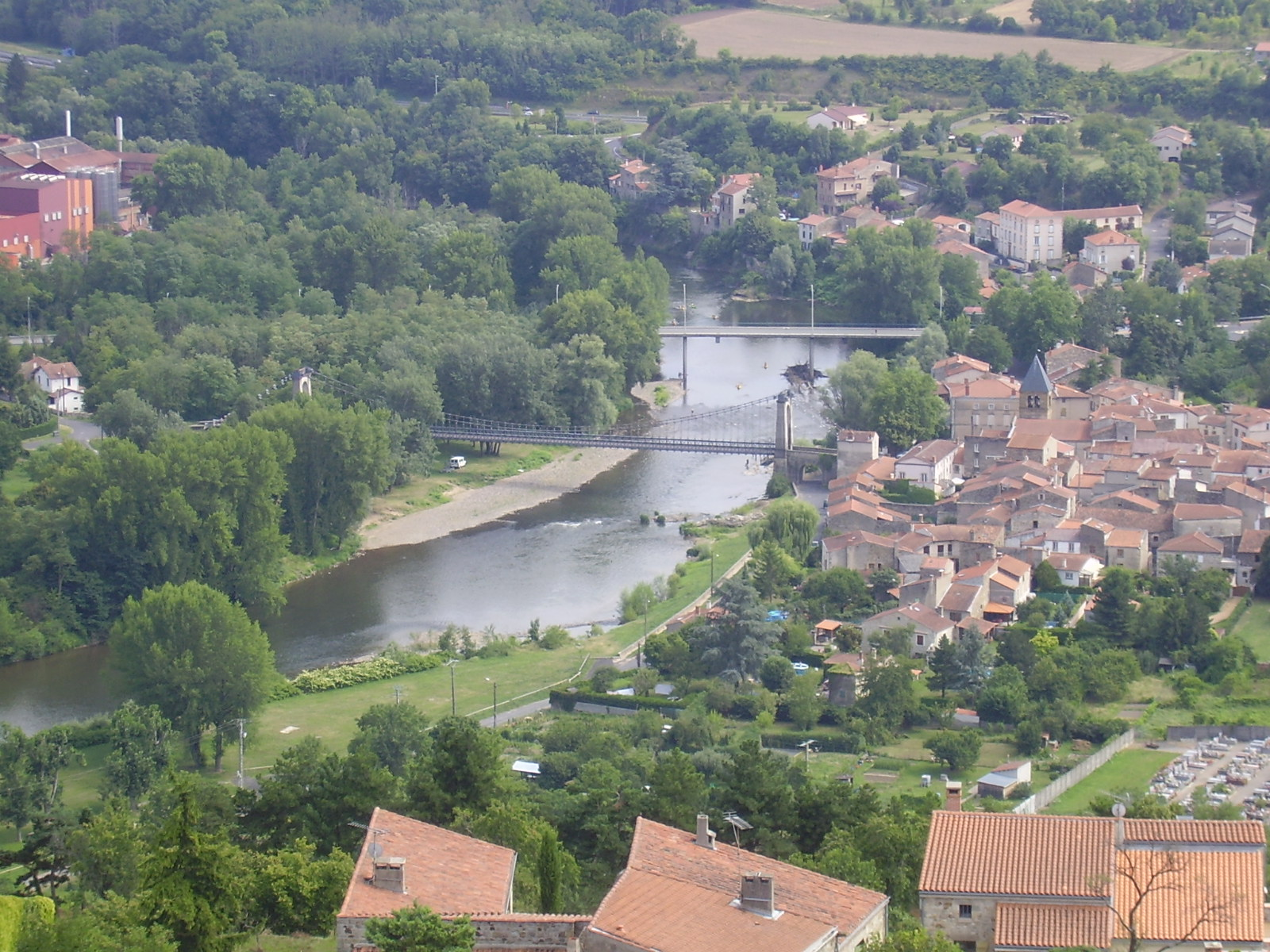
- A general view of Coudes
- Location of Coudes
- Location within France Location within Auvergne-Rhône-Alpes
- Coordinates: 45°36′56″N 3°12′32″E
- Country: France
- Region: Auvergne-Rhône-Alpes
- Department: Puy-de-Dôme
- Arrondissement: Issoire
- Canton: Vic-le-Comte
- Intercommunality: Agglo Pays d'Issoire

Government
  - Mayor (2026–32): Laurys Le Marrec
- Area^{1}: 4.66 km^{2} (1.80 sq mi)
- Elevation: 359 m (1,178 ft)
- Highest elevation: 465 m (1,526 ft)
- Lowest elevation: 340 m (1,120 ft)
- Population (2023): 1,225
  - Density: 263/km^{2} (681/sq mi)
- Time zone: UTC+01:00 (CET)
  - Summer (DST): UTC+02:00 (CEST)
- INSEE/Postal code: 63121 /63114
- ^{1} French Land Register data, which excludes lakes, ponds, glaciers > 1 km^{2} (0.386 sq mi or 247 acres) and river estuaries.

Coudes (French pronunciation: [kud]) is a commune in the Puy-de-Dôme department in Auvergne-Rhône-Alpes in central France.

== See also ==
- Communes of the Puy-de-Dôme department
