= Massiac =

Commune in Auvergne-Rhône-Alpes, France

- Commune
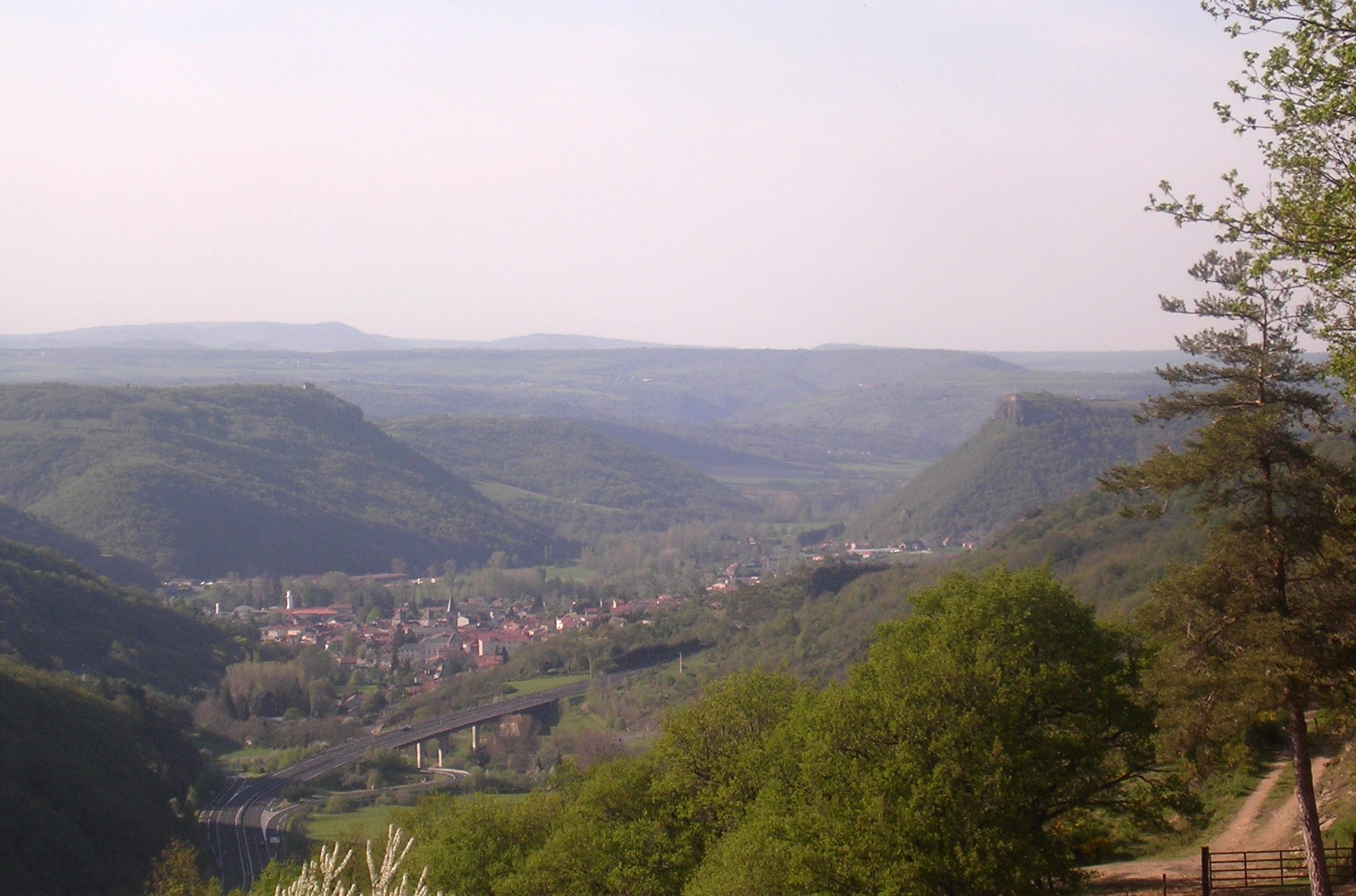
- Massiac seen from the Alagnonnette valley

- Coat of arms
- Location of Massiac
- Location within France Location within Auvergne-Rhône-Alpes
- Coordinates: 45°15′07″N 3°11′53″E
- Country: France
- Region: Auvergne-Rhône-Alpes
- Department: Cantal
- Arrondissement: Saint-Flour
- Canton: Saint-Flour-1
- Intercommunality: Hautes Terres

Government
  - Mayor (2020–2026): Didier Achalme
- Area^{1}: 34.78 km^{2} (13.43 sq mi)
- Elevation: 540 m (1,770 ft)
- Highest elevation: 1,005 m (3,297 ft)
- Lowest elevation: 511 m (1,677 ft)
- Population (2023): 1,796
  - Density: 51.64/km^{2} (133.7/sq mi)
- Time zone: UTC+01:00 (CET)
  - Summer (DST): UTC+02:00 (CEST)
- INSEE/Postal code: 15119 /15500
- ^{1} French Land Register data, which excludes lakes, ponds, glaciers > 1 km^{2} (0.386 sq mi or 247 acres) and river estuaries.

Massiac (French pronunciation: [masjak]; Occitan: Maciac) is a commune in the Cantal department in south-central France.

The commune is listed as a Village étape.

== Population ==
Historical population
Year	Pop.	±% p.a.
1968	1,756	—
1975	1,884	+1.01%
1982	1,838	−0.35%
1990	1,881	+0.29%
1999	1,857	−0.14%
2007	1,825	−0.22%
2012	1,793	−0.35%
2017	1,745	−0.54%
2023	1,796	+0.48%
Source: INSEE

== Local history ==
In the 17th century, Massiac was ruled by the feudal lord Gaspard d'Espinchal, a notorious murderer, kidnapper, and nobleman who was pursued and prosecuted by the Riom Court of Justice during the 1665-6 "Grands Jours", a national inquest into criminality in the Auvergne highlands. Historians have described him as a "real-life Dracula."

== See also ==
- Communes of the Cantal department
