= Meyrueis =

- Commune
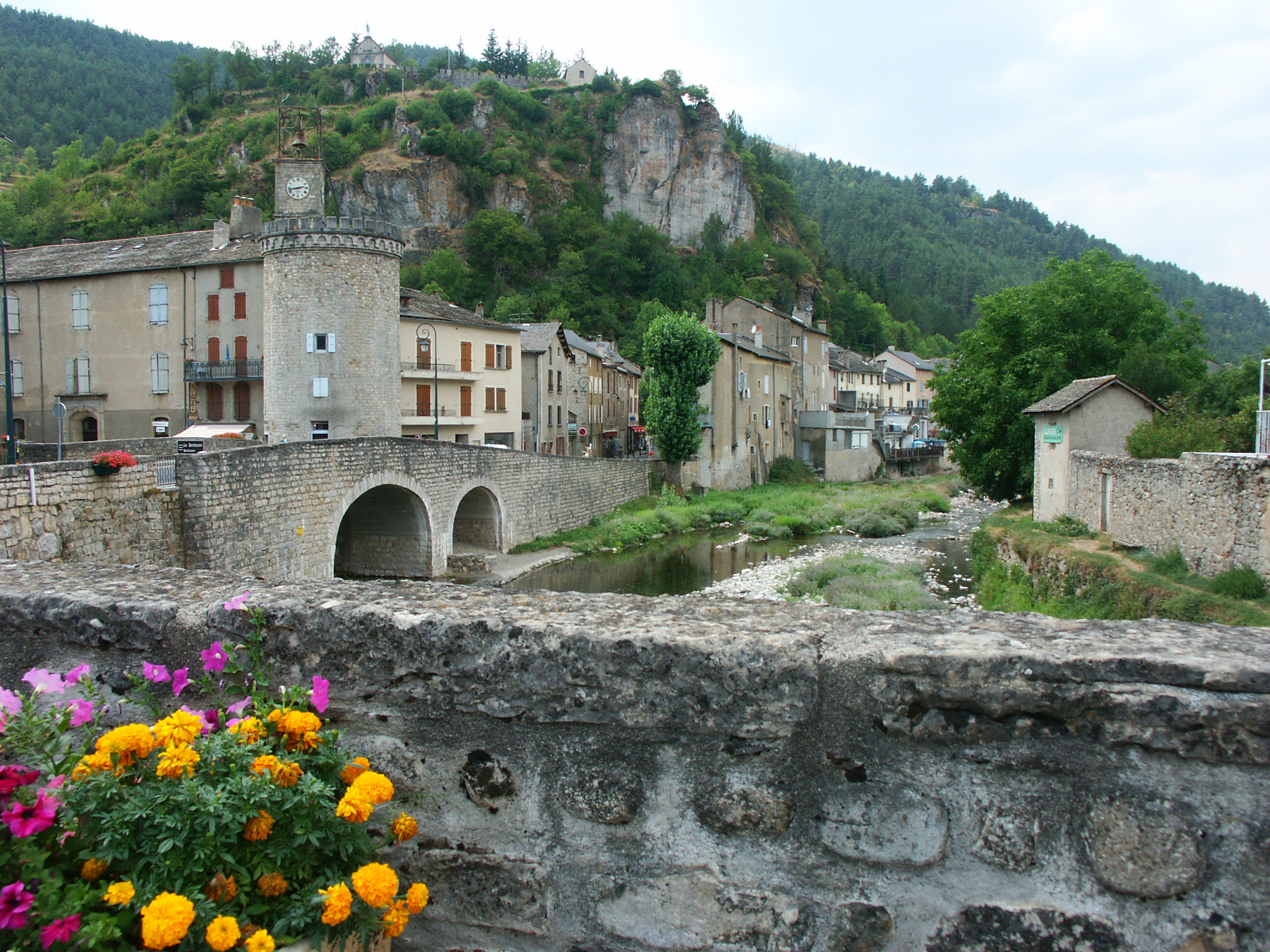
- Clock tower and bridge over the Béthuzon in Meyrueis

- Coat of arms
- Location of Meyrueis
- Location within France Location within Occitanie
- Coordinates: 44°10′46″N 3°25′49″E
- Country: France
- Region: Occitania
- Department: Lozère
- Arrondissement: Florac
- Canton: Florac Trois Rivières
- Intercommunality: Gorges Causses Cévennes

Government
  - Mayor (2020–2026): René Jeanjean
- Area^{1}: 104.68 km^{2} (40.42 sq mi)
- Elevation: 706 m (2,316 ft)
- Highest elevation: 1,562 m (5,125 ft)
- Lowest elevation: 611 m (2,005 ft)
- Population (2023): 770
  - Density: 7.4/km^{2} (19/sq mi)
- Time zone: UTC+01:00 (CET)
  - Summer (DST): UTC+02:00 (CEST)
- INSEE/Postal code: 48096 /48150
- ^{1} French Land Register data, which excludes lakes, ponds, glaciers > 1 km^{2} (0.386 sq mi or 247 acres) and river estuaries.

Meyrueis (French pronunciation: [mɛʁɥɛs]; Occitan: Maruèis) is a commune in the Lozère department in southern France.

== Geography ==
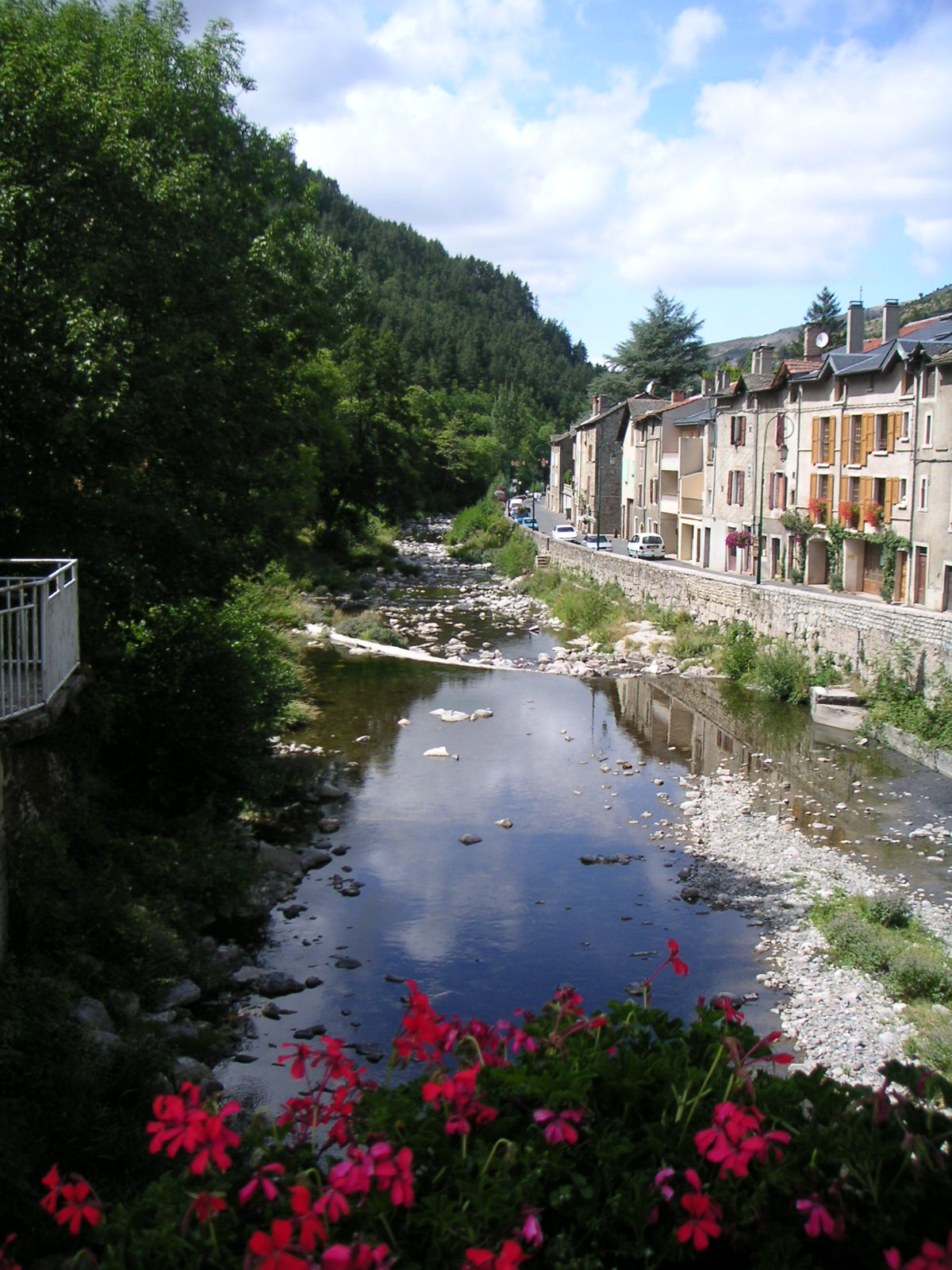
The Jonte at Meyrueis

The town of Meyrueis is located between the foothills of Mont Aigoual to the south and the Causse Méjean to the north. The town thus marks the border between the geographic areas of the Grands Causses, Causse Noir and Causse Méjean, and the Cévennes Mountains. Three rivers meet there: the Jonte, the Béthuzon and the Brèze. The communal territory extends across 10,468 hectares, delimited by an approximate rectangle 25 km long and 10 km wide. It has an average altitude of 706 metres; the highest point is 1562 metres.

The neighbouring towns are Saint-Pierre-des-Tripiers and Hures-la-Parade to the north, Gatuzières to the east, and Saint-Sauveur-Camprieu and Lanuéjols to the south. To the south-west, lies the commune of Veyreau in the Aveyron département.

== History ==
=== From Prehistory to the Gallo-Roman Period ===
The earliest evidence of a permanent settlement in the valley of Meyrueis dates from the end of prehistory. The region is divided between different Celtic tribes: Gabales on the Causse Méjean, Rutenes next to Rozier and the Causse Noir, and Volques Arécomiques between Meyrueis, Mount Aigoual and Nemausus (Nîmes). The agglomeration of Meyrueis itself appears at the beginning of the Christian area on a terrace dominating the confluence of the Jonte with the Brèze and the Béthuzon. An excavation, conducted in the 1980s in the district of Claouset, has identified a group of houses located around a public monument (temple or civil basilica?). This Gallo-Roman settlement dates from the 1st century. Other vestiges of the same period also mark the region. The valleys of Meyrueis then form the northwest boundary of the civitas (administrative territory and diocese) of Nîmes.

=== The birth of a barony ===
At the fall of the Roman Empire, the Meyrueis region is included in the Visigothic kingdom. In the 8th century, during the Arab invasion of Spain, the kingdom disappears. The Gallic part, the Septimania, in a period dominated by the Saracens, is integrated into the Carolingian Empire. In the 10th century, the powerful family of Anduze, descendants of the last Visigoth counts of Nîmes, reigns over the entire region. Meyrueis then marks the boundaries between the States of Languedoc, to which it belongs, and the neighbouring counties of Gévaudan and Rouergue. Overlooking the city from a height of fifty metres on le Rocher (the Rock) sits a fortress of Carolingian origin belonging to the barons of Meyrueis, the youngest branch of the Anduze family. Meyrueis is also the seat of local viguerie (administrative court) representing the Viscount of Nîmes over a territory extending from the Causse Méjean to the upper valley of the Hérault river. Following various marriages and inheritances, the barony and castle then successively belong to the House of Roquefeuil-Anduze (1129), the Counts of the County of Rodez (1230), the House of Armagnac (1298), and the Counts of Alençon before falling in 1321 to the Albret family.

=== A medieval market town ===
Located between Causses and Cévennes, the city becomes an important centre for trade and transhumance between Auvergne and Bas-Languedoc in the 10th century. Three-yearly fairs, including that of St Michael (Saint-Michel), lasting ten days until the end of September, and its weekly market attested from 1033, attract vendors and buyers from the three provinces. These crowds justify the existence of many hostels, inns and pubs (including Maison Portalier) and the presence of a tiny Jewish quarter (the Judarié). Trading covers cereals, wool, cattle, horses, and mules. The important fair of St Michael also marks the period for local credit payments, hiring shepherds and other workers, and concluding farm contracts.

=== Religious presence in the Middle Ages ===
The Camin Ferrat is the path connecting the Gévaudan and Causse Méjean with the famous Gellone Abbey at Saint-Guilhem-le-Désert in Languedoc. It enters the city by the southern gate (the Pied de Ville) after the bridge over the Jonte river (le Pont Vieux), and crosses the city. The tomb of Saint Guilhem and the supposed relics of the Holy Cross still attract crowds. On this path in the early 11th century, the barons of Meyrueis erect a small Roman-style priory dedicated to St Peter (c1034?). In 1042, the monks of the Benedictine Abbey of Gellone receive the priory as the gift from Bermont de Sauve and his brother Almérade d'Anduze. In 1058, the powerful monastery of St Victor of Marseilles is established in the valley with the acquisition of Saint-Martin-des-Ayres (1 km east of the city). In the 12th century, the hospital of the Order of St John of Jerusalem (Knights of Malta today) found a hospital and a church dedicated to St John. Owners of large estates on the Causse Noir, they also create a mill in the city and a house for the commander.

=== An independent municipality (13th to 15th century) ===
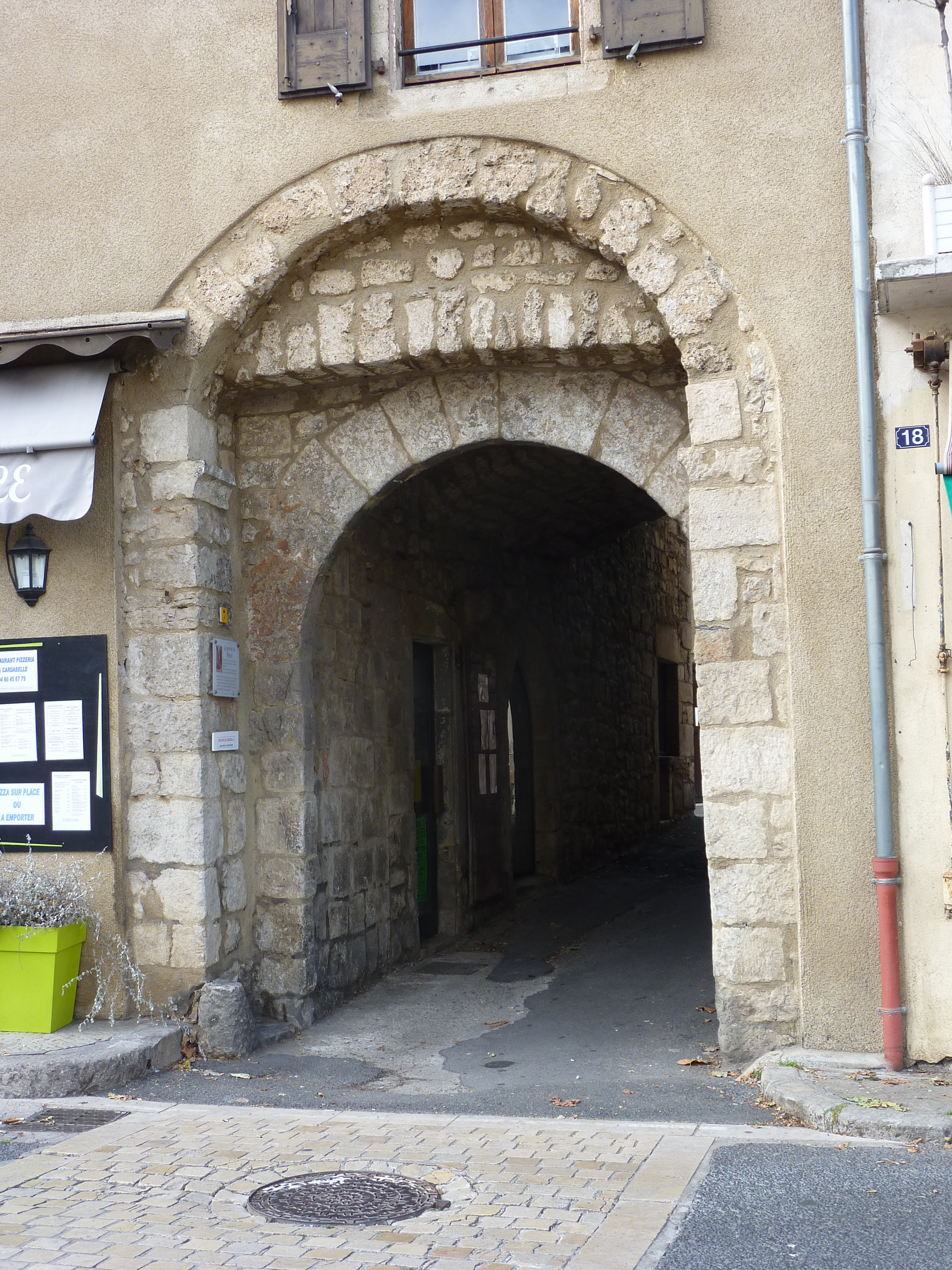
Porte Méjane

In 1229, the citizens of Meyrueis receive a charter granting broad autonomy to the city: a mayor (the sendic-majer), assisted by a council of 13 members, governs the city. The town house (Maison Commune, later Maison des Consuls) is located near a tiny square, next to the town oven, where citizens can cook their bread by virtue of a municipal tax. Ramparts are erected around the city. They are pierced by three gates (Pied-de-Ville, Méjeane, and Cap de Ville). One of the towers is installed with the town clock in the 14th century. In addition to trading, Meyrueis becomes a centre for the manufacture of woollen products. Many carders, weavers and spinners treat sheep fleeces from the Causses to produce a popular strong fabric.

From the mid-15th century two consuls head the municipality. Despite the turmoil of the late Middle Ages (crusade against the Cathars, the Hundred Years' War, plagues and famines,...) Meyrueis continues to grow.

=== The hat factories and the Protestant Reformation (16th century) ===
In the 16th century, a new profession emerges among Meyrueis artisans: hatters. They produce headwear from a pelt made of a blend of fine wool with floss silk (noble waste from cocoon spinning). By mid-century, the town is won over to the Protestant Reformation. In 1559, the consuls decree the adoption of the Calvinist religion. Conflicts and religious convulsions last two centuries. At the outbreak of unrest, Catholic religious communities are dissolved and churches are demolished (like the priory of Saint-Pierre). The celebration of Catholic worship is interrupted from 1560 to 1620. The population, which then exceeds 2,000 inhabitants, is all Protestant. A temple is built in the main street (before 1580): a large square building surrounded by two-storey stands, which can accommodate nearly a thousand faithful. The medieval city walls are also strengthened (the clock tower is rebuilt in 1568). The office of "viguier" (governor of the castle and court judge) is now owned by the family Pagès de Pourcares (who also hold the barony of Roquedols). François Hérail Pagès de Pourcarès, nicknamed Captain Pourcarès, distinguishes himself as leader of the Protestant troops during local battles. The same occurs with the Galtiers operating from the Priory of Ayres, which became a real castle.

=== Catholic reconquest (17th century) ===
In 1607, Henri IV of France, who inherited the castle Meyrueis from his mother, Jeanne d'Albret, unites his possessions into the Royal Domain. Some years later, Jean Gely of Costelongue, Lieutenant of the Royal Viguier, collects all the official titles and acts of the barony of Meyrueis and transcribes them in a register, the Thalamus (1620). With the revolt of the Protestant cities of western and southern France against the young King Louis XIII, the castle loses his last seat in May 1628. Henri, Duke of Rohan, military leader of the rebels, lays siege with several thousand men before le Rocher. The latter, held by a garrison loyal to the king, threaten insurgency in the city. After three weeks of siege, the 130 soldiers of the Royal Captain Regis surrender, leaving the castle in the hands of the Duke. But this success is short-lived: the Duke is defeated in 1629. The Peace of Alès provides an amnesty for the rebels but orders the destruction of their fortifications. The castle and the two main gates of the city are demolished in 1632. It will not be until the mid-17th century that the Catholic religion is restored permanently. Around 1655, Anthyme Denis Cohon, Bishop of Nîmes in charge of the parish of Meyrueis, entrusts a Jesuit community with the restoration of Catholic worship. Three priests are responsible for the return to the Catholic faith of Protestant citizens who constitute 90% of the population. The large church of St Peter, with its adjacent convent, is consecrated in 1663. The Jesuits also create a college in the former priory. They receive the best sons of Protestant families, placed there by the authorities to obtain their abjuration. The revocation of the Edict of Nantes in 1685, recognized locally by the erection of a cross "de la Contre-Réforme", sees the destruction of the first Protestant church that had been built around 1580. In 1694, to better manage the newly converted Huguenots of the Cévennes, Louis XIV creates the diocese of Alès. Meyrueis becomes the seat of one of the Archpriests of the new diocese.

=== Meyrueis in the 18th century ===
Throughout the 18th century, the Protestant community of Meyrueis continues to pursue some resistance to the royal persecution. From 1685 to 1791, companies of dragoons are stationed in Meyrueis. They carry out their manoeuvres and exercises on the Champ de Mars (Le Pré Nouveau) and are lodged with local families. The Joly de Morey house recalls the history of this distinguished Protestant family after a dragoons' captain married the housemaid, Judith Vallat Lisside. He is supposed to convert his new family to Catholicism. Captivated by the obstinate resistance of his wife and his wife's family, he himself adopts the Protestant religion: he is then sentenced to the galleys and exiled to Geneva. The Camisards War also affects the region between 1702 and 1705. A brotherhood of White Penitents brings together some of the converted distinguished citizens. The economic prosperity of the city continues however with the hatters, whose numbers are growing, and trading, including that of draught animals, very active in 1780. Other houses of notables, merchants or landowners mark the outskirts of Meyrueis: Maison Maurin (or Grande Maison) in the late 17th century, the Cavalier House, Maison de Thomassy, de Bragouse de Saint-Sauveur. In 1760, the parish counts only 400 Catholic faithful in a population of almost 4,000 souls (including all the surrounding villages). The religious situation calms down a little at the end of the century: a Protestant parsonage is built in 1783.

=== Revolution and religious pacification (1789-1880) ===
The French Revolution assigns the city of Meyrueis, as well as the ephemeral municipality Meyrueis, Campagne, (1793-1819), to the newly created department of Lozère (corresponding to the former Gévaudan province), breaking the multi-secular ties with the Languedoc province.

The town also becomes chief town of the district from 1790 to 1795. The parish then depends on the Bishop of Mende (Concordat of 1803). In 1791, Michel Papel, parish priest since 1784, refuses to take the constitutional oath. He leaves his post in July 1792 to take the path of exile. Arriving at Aigues-Mortes, he turns back either for lack of money or the desire to return to his flock, to hide with other exiles in a cave of the Tarn Gorge (the "cave of outlaws" at La Malene). Denounced, he is led to Mende, convicted and executed on the spot on 1 November 1794. The same year, Meyrueis witnesses the execution of Father Geraud Arnal, refractory priest of Saint-Pierre-des-Tripiers and one of the introducers of the steamboat in France (1781) and inventor of a steam mill (Nîmes, 1783).

Florit Francis de la Tour succeeds Papel. Hoping to become bishop, he takes the oath. He then abdicates on 30 November 1793 in order to get married. Antoine Sylvestre Bragouse de Saint-Sauveur, born in a newly converted family, takes refuge in his hometown during the revolutionary events and becomes interim parish priest (1794). Named Archpriest of the Cathedral of Mende in 1803, he later becomes bishop with the support of Napoleon. Jean Vernon, who will hold an itinerant and underground ministry disguised as furrier during the Reign of Terror, succeeds him in the parish of Meyrueis (1803-1805).

Freedom of worship encourages Protestants of the city to build another temple in 1797. Poorly built, it nearly collapses, is closed in 1829, and then demolished in 1836. The present octagonal temple, built between 1837 and 1842, replaces it. Meyrueis is also the birthplace of the Catholic theologian Henry Maret (1805), professor of theology at the Sorbonne (1841) and bishop despite the opposition of the Vatican (1860). He is one of the leaders of the progressive movement that will bring the Catholic Church to accept some modernisation and the Republic. Throughout the nineteenth century, through the mechanisms of demography and the influx of workers from the Causse for the hat industry, the Catholic community grows and becomes the majority. In 1857, St Peter's church is enlarged. The last vestiges of the castle are destroyed in 1875 and replaced by the Chapel of Notre-Dame-du-Rocher.

=== Economic life in the 19th century ===
The 19th century sees a peak in industry, with seventeen hat workshops, four spinning wool and silk floss, several tanneries (on the Quai du Pont-Vieux), mills with active trade, and a multitude of small trades. Hatters sell their products throughout the Languedoc and Provence. (Camargue cowboys love this type of hat, and the great Provençal poet Frédéric Mistral always wore one.) The Thomassy family, which has built its fortune on the trading of wool and silk and the exploitation of its large agricultural estates (Causses, Montpellier), is one of the most wealthy and influential in the country. It is the same for Baron Roquedols who owns forests. Trade is prosperous: fairs and markets continue to bring crowds. There are 25 hostels and cafés in the 19th century at Meyrueis. The covered market is rebuilt in 1897 and houses the official weights and measures that guarantee the accuracy of transactions.

=== Tourism revival after 1880 ===
However, after 1880, geographic isolation, compounded by the lack of modern means of transportation (roads and railways) and the beginning of the exodus to big cities, endangers this dynamism. Even hatters are defeated by various problems: the scarcity of wool (dairy sheep, due to the growth of the Roquefort cheese industry supersede the wool sheep), and the fashion for the cap instead of the hat. Milliner activity died in 1921. The closure of the Ayres spinning mill in 1932 spells the end of the textile industry in the valley of Meyrueis. But at the same time (1880) is born a new activity: tourism. Under the leadership of Edward Alfred Martel, explorer of the region and the father of modern speleology and Club Cévenol, is created in 1893 the Syndicat d'Initiatives, forerunner of today's tourist office. Hotels and means of communication develop. The construction of a road to Millau along the Gorges de la Jonte, started in 1840, is finally completed in 1875. The Pont Vieux becomes the main entrance to the city. The automobile workshop, Grand Garage Malafosse, houses during two winters the preparations for the Yellow Cruise expedition (1927). The tests are conducted on the Causses, which present many similarities with the countries of Central Asia that will be traversed by the expedition.

=== The 20th and 21st centuries ===
The wars of the 20th century are remembered at Meyrueis: a memorial by sculptor Auguste Verdier (Millau), built jointly with Gatuzières (1920), located in Place Jean-Séquier, named after a resistance fighter who died while being deportated; a plaque on the house of Claude Nogues, a member of the Maquis Bir Hakeim who fell under German bullets. The heroism of Pastor Robert Frank, who hid many proscribed with the help of parishioners, must also be mentioned.

Today, tourism is the main resource of the city. Meyrueis is first in the Lozère department in terms of hosting capacity. After a sharp decline in population, the 2000s are experiencing a relative stabilization. Several workshops, companies, nursing care buildings (3rd age, disabled) and two colleges (public and private schools) provide a pool of jobs that allow the people of Meyrueis to expect a bright future.

=== Typonyms ===
The most likely etymology for Meyrueis comes from the situation of the city at the confluence of the rivers Jonte, Béthuzon and Brèze. In Occitan language, Meyrueis would be derived from mesclar (to mix) and rius (brooks), or from Latin Midiis riviis, "in the middle of the brooks". Other versions, but less frequent, mention the nature of the soil (Marogium "marshy place") or a former Gallo-Roman estate owner (Maurus).

=== Heraldry ===
Meyrueis

Mentioned for the first time in 1402, the arms of Meyrueis are confirmed by a certificate of authentication signed by Charles d'Hozier, general keeper of the Armorial of France in September 1697.

== Sites and monuments ==
=== Old Castle of Meyrueis ===
A medieval castle of Meyrueis of Carolingian origin was located on the dominant 70-meter rock the city. Seat of a viguerie, which extended from the Causse Méjean to the upper valley of the Hérault River, the castle belonged to the barons of Meyrueis, the youngest branch of the Anduze family, as early as the 10th century. The domain was then owned by a branch of the family Roquefeuil until in 1230 when it passed by marriage to the counts of Rodez, and in 1283 to those of Armagnac, then to the Duke of Alençon, before falling in 1321 to the Albret family. Jeanne d'Albret, Queen of Navarre, bequeathed the castle to his son Henri de Bourbon, who became Henry IV, unites his possessions to the domains of the Crown of France (1607). The castle was repeatedly attacked during the Hundred Years' War by "routiers" (mercenaries) roaming the area. Meyrueis, at that time a Protestant city of Languedoc, was in regular conflict with the young King Louis XIII. The castle lived its last seat in 1628. The Duke Henri de Rohan, military leader of the rebels, laid siege to the castle with several thousand men in May 1628. The castle was held by a garrison loyal to the king and threatened the city in revolt. After three weeks of siege, the 130 soldiers of the Royal Captain Regis capitulated, leaving the castle in the hands of Duke. But this success was short-lived. In 1629, Rohan was defeated and the king sealed peace through the "Grace d'Ales ". This edict, granted in 1630, forgave the rebels but ordered the destruction of their fortifications. The demolition of the castle and the two main gates of the city took place in 1632.

=== Chapel of Our Lady of the Rock ===
The last major remnants of the castle were destroyed in 1875 during the construction of the Chapel of Our Lady of the Rock, which now occupies the site of the fort. This chapel is the subject of two annual pilgrimages, the last Sunday in May and 15 August.

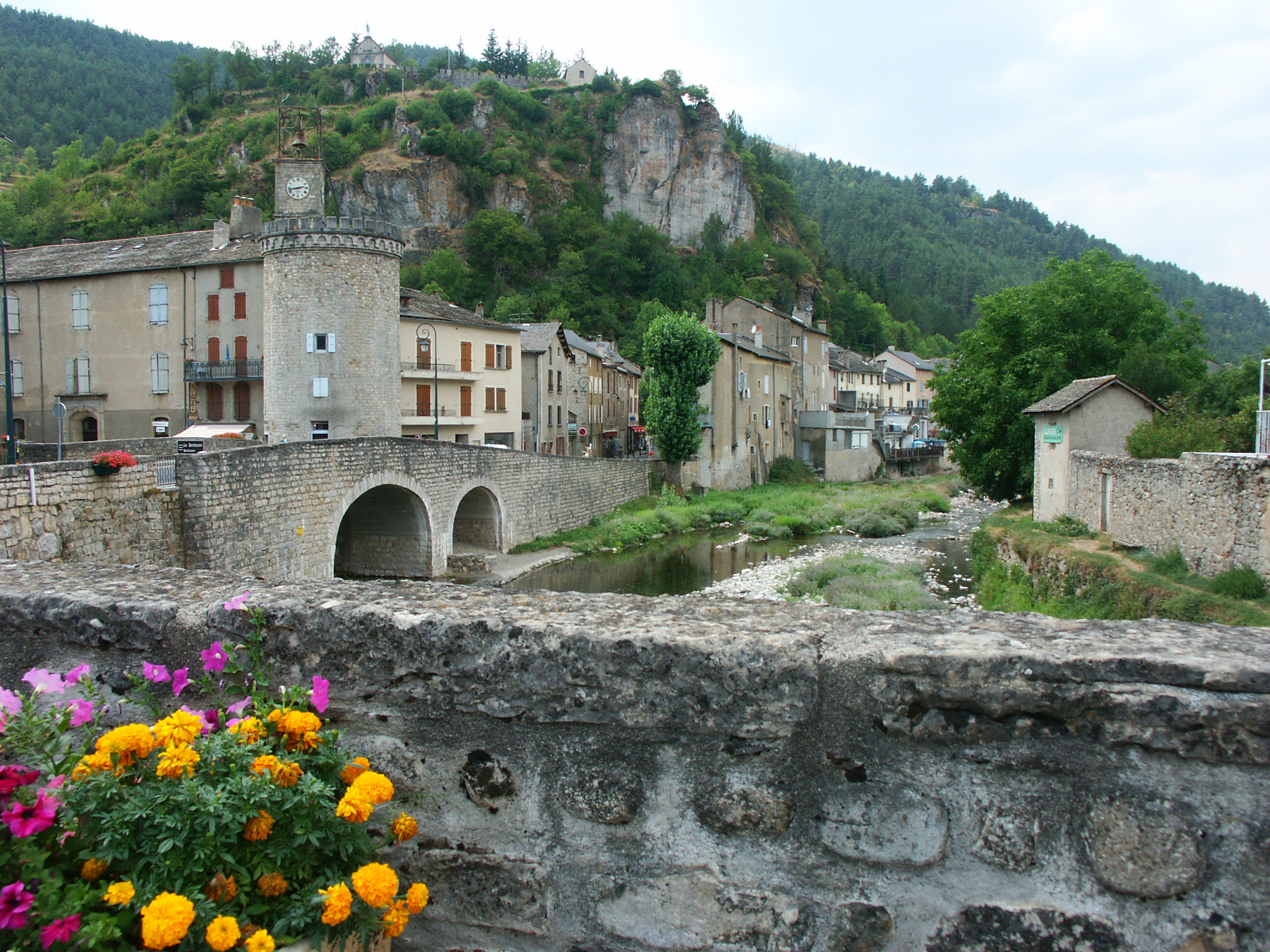
The Rock from the bridge over the Jonte

=== Remains of fortifications and Clock Tower ===
The Meyrueis retains vestiges of its fortifications. Two town gates have survived the destruction of 1632. The Méjeane gate (middle) and portal Prieirou (priory) always provide access to the medieval district, called "La Ville", and contains remains of the Jewish Quarter (Judarié), of the first Protestant church (16th century) and the Maison des Consuls on the small square named the "Planet". The clock tower, rebuilt in 1568 on medieval foundations, forms the angle of the fortifications above the confluence of the Jonte and Béthuzon. Restored after a fire in 1897, the tower bears the town clock since the 14th century. The ironwork campanile on the top contains a bell of nice proportions, dated 1634. Purchased for a half by the municipality and the other by the Protestant church, it was used to mark the hours, call the municipal council, give the alarm, and until 1685, call people to worship. It always beats the hours of the city and now houses the tourist office.

=== Roquedols Castle ===
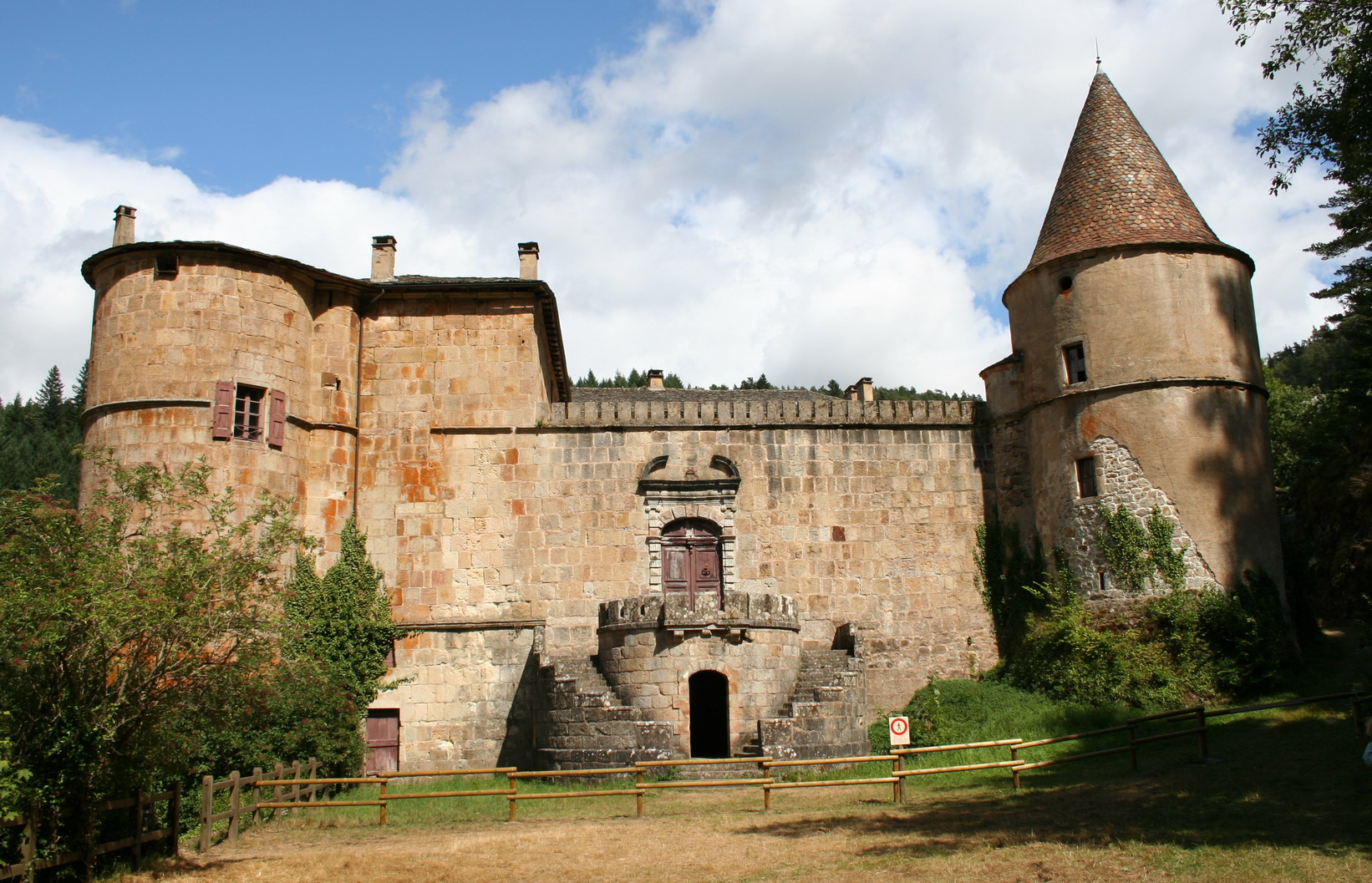
The Roquedols Castle

The Roquedols Castle, located 2 km south of the city in the valley of Béthuzon, dates from the first half of the 16th century.

From 1236 Roquedols (Rocadols, Rocadaholis, Repedolsa = soft rock) was a locality with several mas forming a hamlet. But this is probably at the end of the 14th century that the first castle was built by Sir Pagès de Porcarès, who in 1336 took the title of "noble Pierre Pagès". In the mid-16th century, Antoine de Pagès is called Seigneur de Pourcarès and Roquedols. He probably erects the current castle Roquedols, which front door bears the date 1534. Protestant, he would have made worship "in the fashion of Geneva" in his mansion from 1555. His son Herail Pagès joined the Protestant troops in 1560, first with Francis of Airebaudouze, Baron d'Anduze, then with Captain Matthew Merle after the St. Bartholomew's Day massacre in 1572. By order of Henry IV, he disarms in 1581, and receives the charge of " gentleman of the king's chamber." The Lordship of Pourcarès and Roquedols becomes a barony in 1604.

According to oral tradition, Herail Pagès and his son Jean greeted the king several times in their castle, and Maximilien de Bethune, better known as Sully. Local legend holds that the famous minister would have planted elms along the fortifications, one of which lasted until 1910. Hence the inhabitants named "place Sully" this square in the heart of the city.

In 1617, Baron Porcarès had among his "noble" possessions: "a castle called Roquedols, with its towers and moats, field and other lands, mills to grind wheat with their lock, mulching, threshing grain, gardens, oven, canabière (hemp), poultry farm, ...."

In 1726, Marguerite d'Albignac possesses at "the village of Rocadols" a castle with four towers, a dovecote, gristmill and sawmill, pines, meadows, and other wood and ploughable lands, ...

In 1732, Jean Dupont de Bossuges, Lord Montguirand, living in Ganges, bought the barony of Porcarès including Roquedols. The Dupont de Bossuges, who took the name of Baron de Roquedols, were the last noble owners of the estate, which they sold at the end of the 19th century. During the French Revolution, they saved the castle from public sale as national property by removing the roofing of the corner towers, considered as an aristocratic symbol.

After them, a company of wood sawyers moved to Roquedols until 1893 when the castle was bought by Rose Anastasia Vincent, wife Dol, from Marseille. Her son sold the estate to the state in 1938.

It is now owned by the town of Meyrueis, and is open during exhibitions.

=== Ayres Castle ===
The priory of Saint- Martin des Ayres, near the Jonte, 1 km northeast of the city is transformed into a castle in the 16th century by the Galtier family. After experiencing the vicissitudes of religious conflicts, the building is reconstructed by the Nogaret family in the 18th century and turned into a luxury hotel and restaurant in the 20th century.

=== St. Peter's Church ===
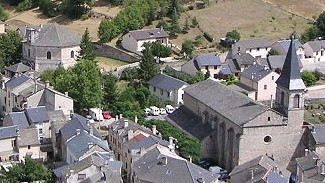
View of St Peter's church and Protestant temple from the Rock

The Church of St. Peter was built in 1663 by the Jesuit order at the request of Cohon, bishop of Nîmes, which sought to restore the Catholic faith in Meyrueis. It is built on the site of another Roman church, destroyed during the religious wars of the 16th century. Some of the stones of the old castle destroyed in 1632 were used in its construction. This sanctuary is typical of churches of the Catholic Counter-Reformation: vast nave propitious to preaching, side chapels (Our Lady of the Rosary and St. Joseph) directly overlooking the nave (and the faithful), choir raised and as wide as the nave so as to be seen from every corner of the church and to ensure the solemnity of the ceremonies. Saint-Pierre was enlarged in 1857 by adding a pentagonal apse of vast proportions, two additional side chapels (chapels Saint-Roch and Our Lady of Good Help) and a forum. Outside, the facade has for any decor a large portal with pilasters supporting a curved tympanum, surmounted by a simple oculus. A triangular pediment crowns the whole, giving the façade a typical austere beauty of the Jesuits. A high bell tower, decked in 1848 by a disproportionate pyramidal slate spire replacing a roof terrace with a balustrade, is attached to the south of the building. It serves as a transition from the adjacent old priory to the sanctuary.

=== Protestant Temple ===
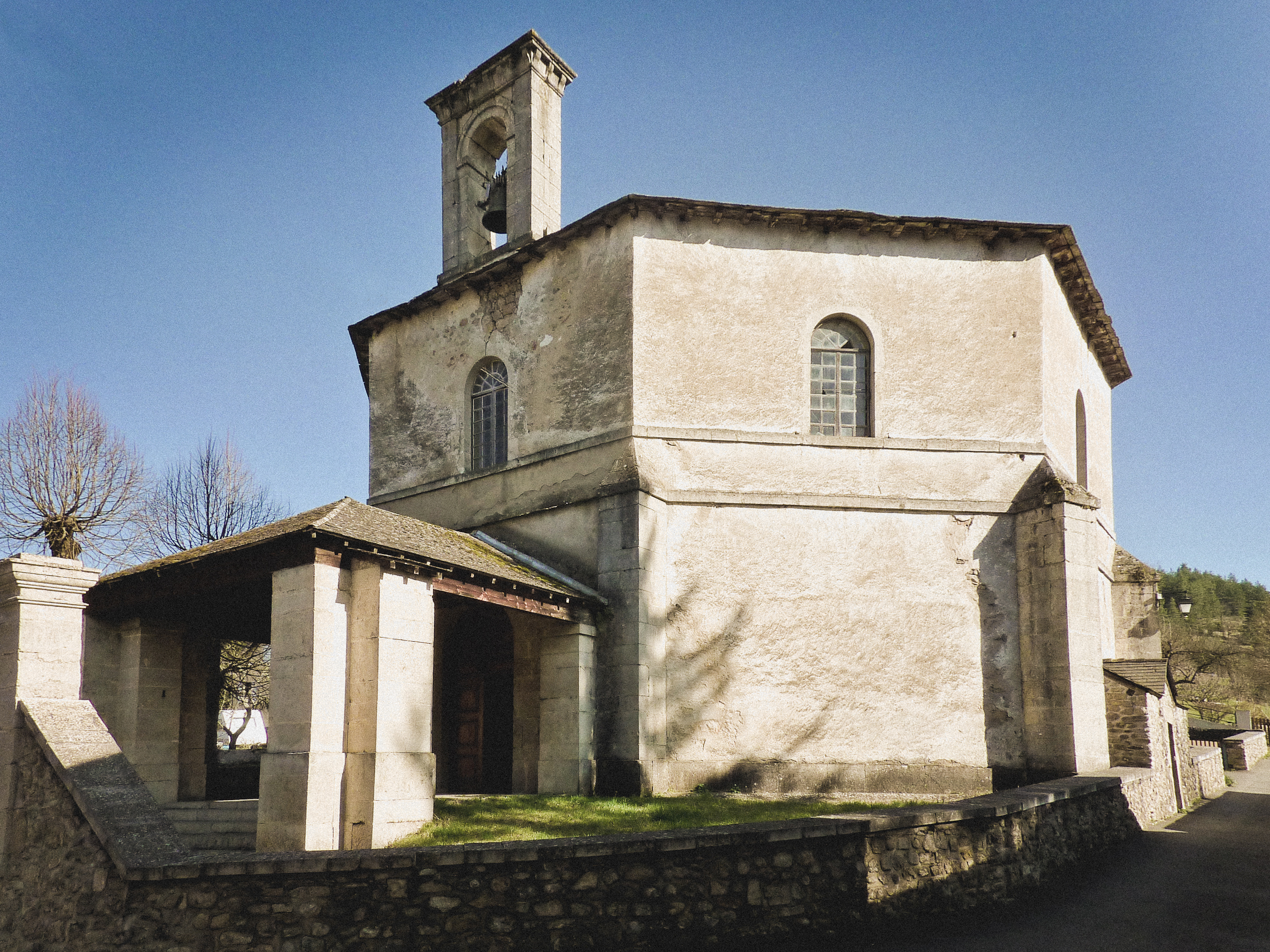
The Protestant temple

Description

The Protestant church, built between 1837 and 1842, appears as a vast octagonal rotunda, covered with a slate roof, preceded by a covered parvis and surmounted by a small bell tower arch. Inside, the space could accommodate up to 500 worshipers. Eight strong wooden pillars support the galleries and the 18 meters high dome covered with painted wood panels. Large windows surmounted by a semicircular arch light the interior. The simple, sleek lines, the balanced proportions produce an impression of harmony. The massive use of wood give this temple excellent acoustics, much appreciated by the artists performing every year during summer concerts.

As in all Protestant places of worship, the interior is very restrained. The space is organized in a semicircle centered on a monumental pulpit in walnut wood, fixed on a wall opposite the main entrance. An open Bible turned to the congregation and a wooden cross lay on the “holy table”. On either side of the pulpit, numbered panels indicate the hymns sung during worship. Below, benches in a semicircle once received the "deacons " sitting on "consistory" elected by the faithful to administer the community.

History

As early as 1797, the Protestant community of Meyrueis started erecting a temple at a place called "The Cooler", on a piece of land that was used since the 16th century as a cemetery to the Huguenots. Stingily built without state support, this place of worship never gave satisfaction. Its rapid degradation caused his closing (1829) and its demolition (1836). On the same location, the building contractors Martin and Pellet erected a new temple according to the plans of the architect Meynadier. Started in 1837, following many technical, financial and administrative difficulties, the construction dragged until 1842.

During this period, to worship in the winter, the parish had to rent a small unsanitary room in town. In summer, the ceremonies were held outdoors in the yard adjacent to the cemetery. Finally, in October 1842, the new church was dedicated. It took a few years to finish: gates and fence the land (1847), purchase of the bell (1853) ... The total cost of construction exceeded the 30,000 francs at the time. The cemetery was decommissioned and transferred to the municipal cemetery in 1897. This building, as an important element of the Protestant architecture in Languedoc-Roussillon, is listed as a historic monument since 24 September 2008.

=== Houses and mansions ===
Meyrueis has a few mansions, some built in the sixteenth and 18th centuries thanks to the flourishing wool trade:

- Hôtel Pagès de Pourcarès (16th century), also called the "Maison du Viguier" with several remarkable mullioned windows
- Hôtel Bragouse de Saint-Sauveur
- Hôtel Thomassy
- Hôtel Valat
- Hôtel Cavalier
- Hôtel Gely de Costelongue
- Hôtel Michel du Bedos
- Hôtel Maurin de Carnac also called “the Big House”
- Hôtel Joly de Morey
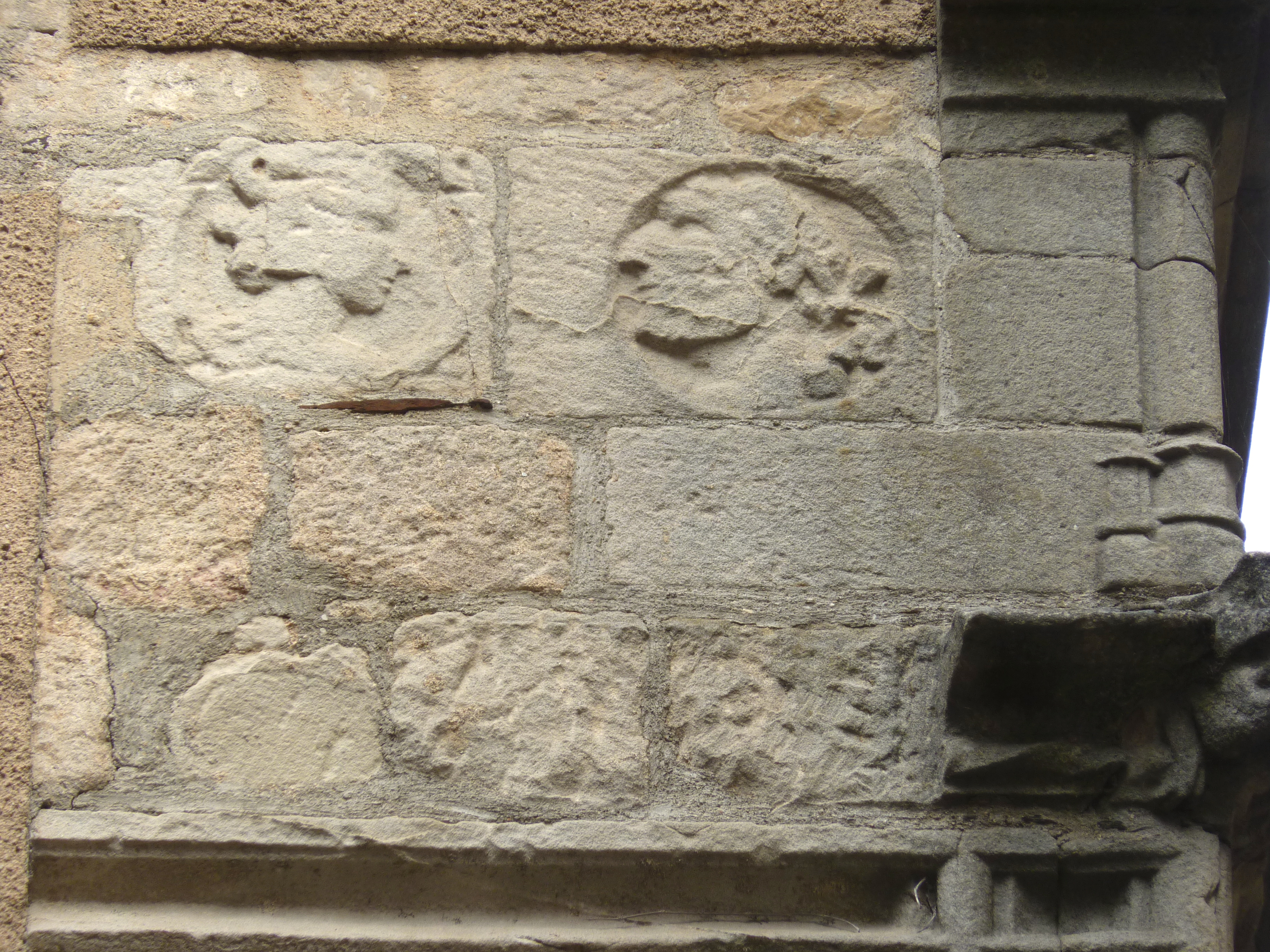
Maison du Viguier - Portraits of Douce de Thomassy and François Hérail Pagès de Pourcarès, in front of the house

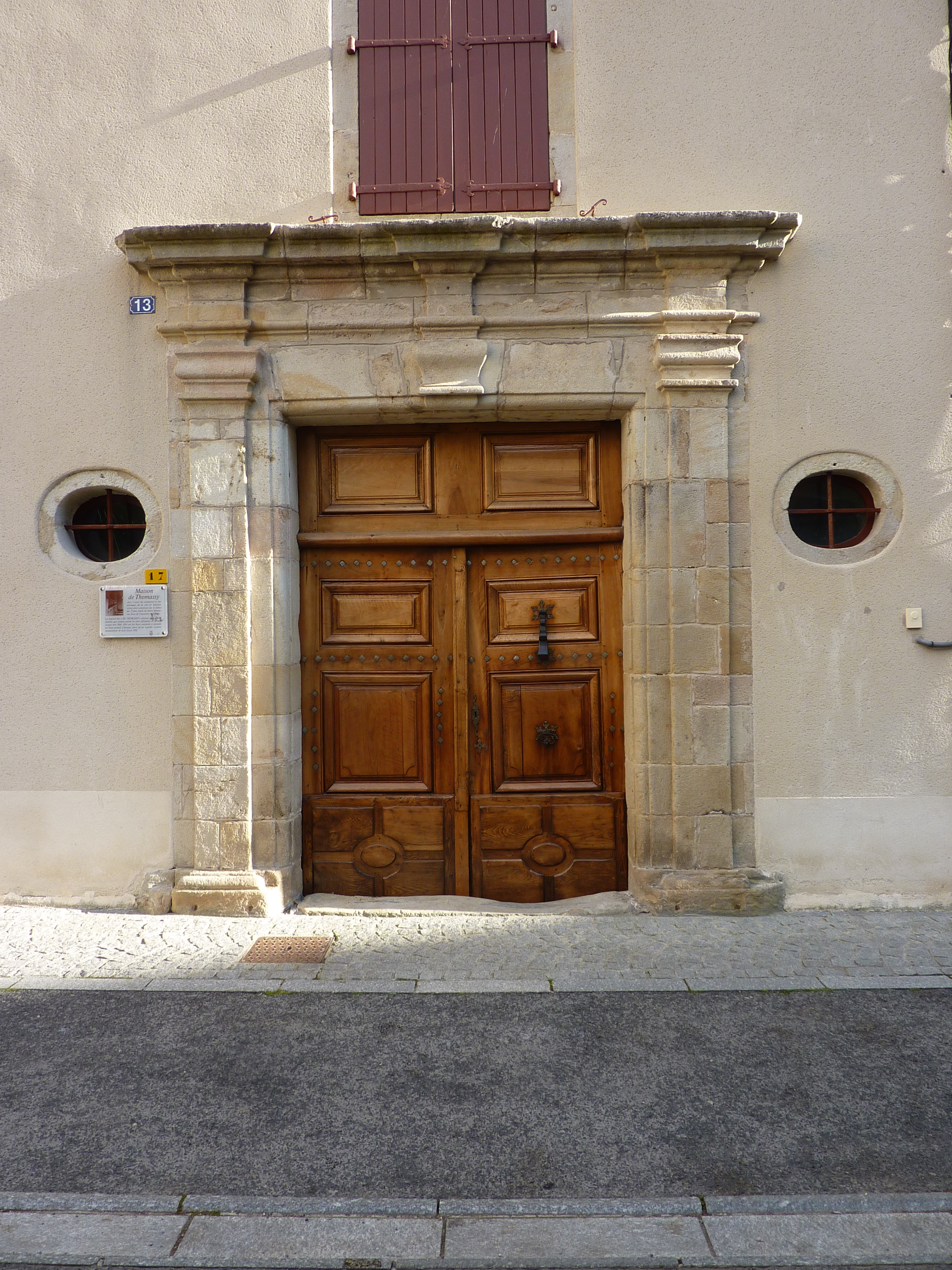
Hôtel Thomassy

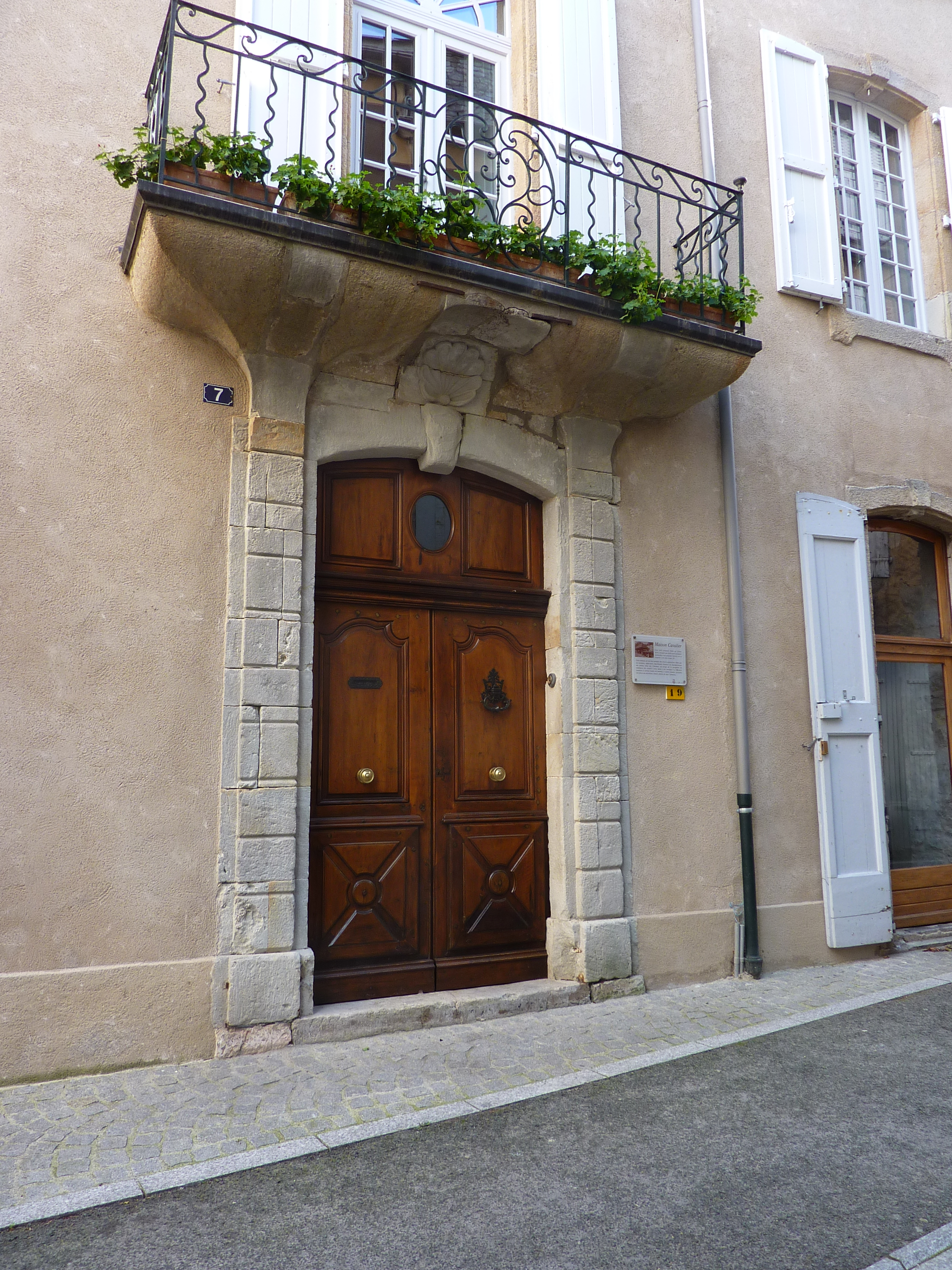
Hôtel Cavalier

=== Industrial heritage ===
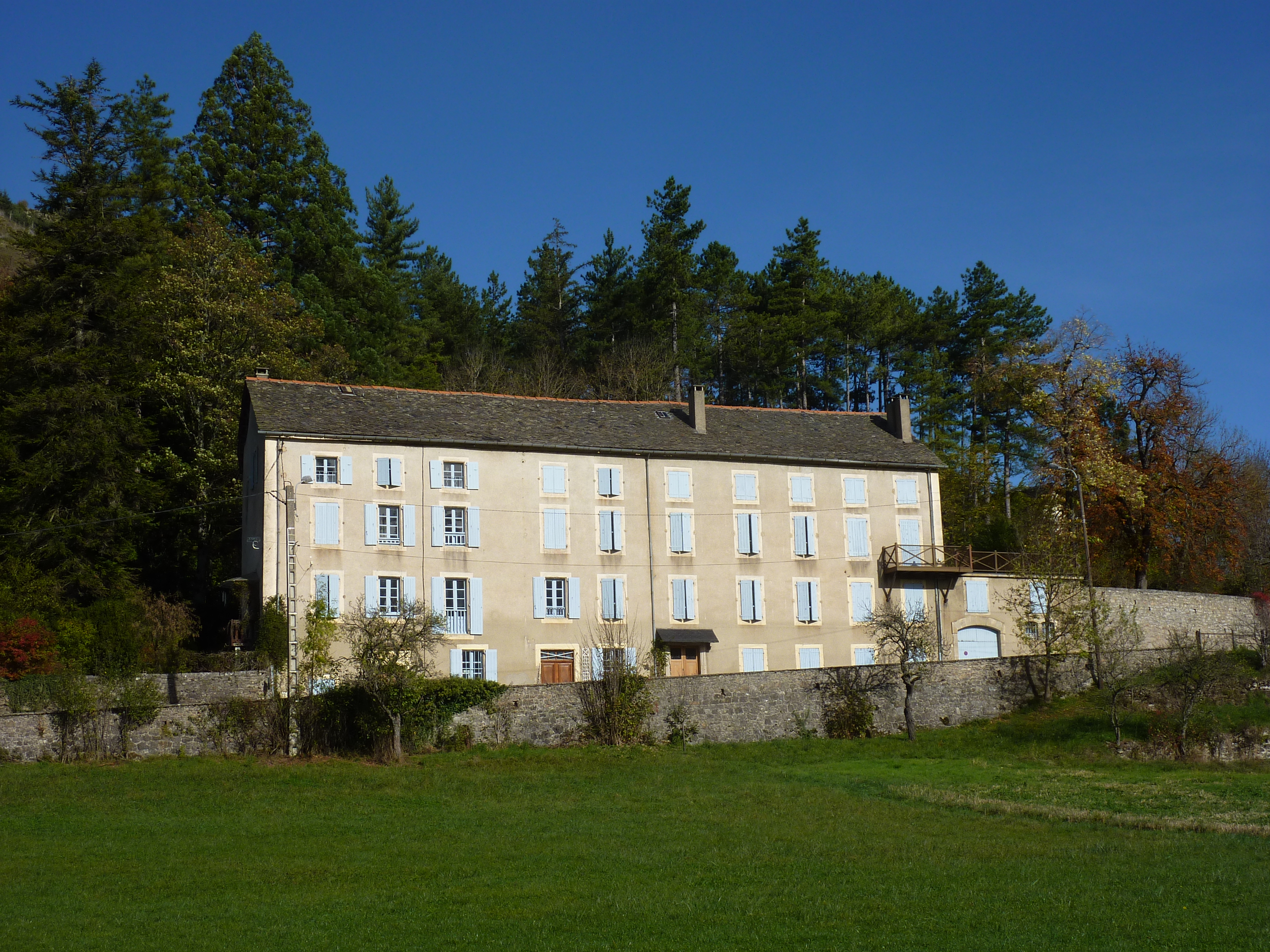
La Fabrique

Vincent spinning factory (spinning silk and wool wastes) also called 'La Fabrique'

Designed by Pierre Cabanel with a door key dated 1833, the building was sold in 1843 to Pierre Vincent. Expanded in 1844 and declared as carding wads of tissue (1847), its activity is reduced in 1855 and it undergoes at least partial conversion to wool. Part of the activity is transferred to the mill Montblanc. The factory, managed by Florent Malzac, survives at craft level until around 1866. Twenty years later, the building is converted into a house by Louis Vincent, prefect of Herault (1886). In 1902, a small building is added on the east side, replacing the old boiler.

Nails Malzac then spinning Malzac, also called mill or sawmill Laporte Saurin (nails, then spinning silk waste and sawmill)

Located at a place called "Lucalus" on the way to Roquedols, a house and a nails factory are built in 1844 by Florent Malzac. In 1847, the building is enlarged and transformed into carding wads of tissue (with 4 sets of 2 trades carding). Housing, delivery and storage are located on the ground floor, workshop at first floor, dryer under the roof. The estate is sold in 1857 to Felix Laporte, a trademan from Le Vigan. Eugene Saurin, merchant in Marseille, bought the building in 1866 and transformed it into a sawmill. A 2 meters high waterfall then provides the energy. This whole house is then transformed into a rural building in 1889 and later abandoned. Today, one of the buildings has been restored and houses a small museum of woodworking.

Mill Berger, then spinning Fulcrand, also called sawmill Maurin (flour mill, then woolen mill and sawmill)

The mill, belonging to the Oustal (restaurant) Jupiter rue du Barry according to the cadastre of 1841, has certainly a more ancient origin. The owner, Jean-Baptiste Berger sells it to Mr. Maurin, and passes by marriage to Mr. Saurin. In 1869, the mill is transformed into woolen mill (with 4 sets of carding and spinning spindles 144) led successively by Joseph Fulcrand, M. Bayle (1874) and David Saumade (from 1884, with a single range of chard). Mr. Saurin's son transforms spinning mill into a sawmill in 1902. The activity ceases before the Second World War. The building is then converted into a house. The vertical waterwheel with a fall of 2 meters (150 liters per second), built in 1869, is destroyed around 1965. The various rearrangements later made on this 275 m2 building makes it a mixture of different types of construction: various bays, mechanical roof tiles or slabs of schist ...

Mill Montblanc (flour mill and woolen mill)

The three-story flour mill, built with pebble stones, belongs to Philippe Manoël de Nogaret from the castle of Ayres in 1841, according to the cadastre. Located on the banks of the Jonte at a place called the Plaine, it is fed by a canal deriving water from the Brèze. A 5-horsepower hydraulic motor is installed in 1855. The carding and weaving factory Vincent is situated next to the mill in the same year (1855). According to oral tradition, Jean-Antoine Veygalier who lives in a building located across the road along the Brèze operates the mill. In 1866, with the closing of the textile industry, the mill only works as a flour factory until about 1940. Currently, the mill is restored into a house. In the 20th century, the building served as veterinary infirmary, then stables and shed. The entire mill Montblanc occupies 438 m2.

Moulin d'Ayres, also called spinning Laget or spinning Saumade (treading mill, silk mill fluff and woolen mill)

This mill, probably flour, is attested in the 18th century. It initially belongs to the Manoël d'Ayres family whose castle is 700 meters south. In the cadastre of 1841, it is mentioned as a fulling mill owned by Louis Pagett. In 1849 it is transformed into carding of silk floss, then gradually converted into wool carding. The spinning is managed by Benjamin Avesque, who goes bankrupt in 1855, then by David Saumade. His son sells the buildings in 1892 to Louis Couderc who operates the carding wool until 1926.

The complex, with an area of 345 m2, is flanked by a truncated oval tower. The mill has a vertical hydraulic bucket wheel 2 meters radius with waterfall of 2.30 meters, three workshops, four finishing trades and twenty hand presses (1851). In 1881, it has four chards, a trade of 108 pins and a pot to tread. There are also private archives.

Veyrier hat (felt hat factory)

Hippolyte Veyrier, a hat manufacturer, builds his own house in 1884, then expands it in 1887. He erects a plant on the other side in 1904 to replace the old workshop in the village. The workshops are in stone with brick frame. In 1929, all buildings (595 m2) pass to Henri Veyrier, a businessman from Bruyeres in the Vosges. The steam engine is removed in 1943. Currently, local police use the workshops and the main building is a private house.

== Personalities connected to the town ==
- Sylvestre-Antoine Bragouse de Saint-Sauveur (1748-1805), bishop of Poitiers.
- Guilhem Ademar (1190/1195–1217), of noble origin but poor, was songwriter troubadour in Gévaudan.
- Henry Maret (1805-1884), Catholic theologist and bishop
- Louis Laget (1821-1882), politician and prefect.
- Jean Séquier, resistant died in deportation; a square in Meyrueis bears his name
- Robert Verdier (1910-2009), resistant and politician

== In popular culture ==
Meyrueis is the scene of the sprint finish of an amateur 1977 cycle race, La Tour de Mont Aigoual, which is the subject of the novel The Rider (De Renner) by the Dutch author Tim Krabbé. This novel is widely regarded by cyclists as one of the finest pieces of writing about cycling and cycle racing.

== See also ==
- Aven Armand, a cave
- Jonte (river)
