= Florac =

Commune in Lozère, France

- Part of Florac-Trois-Rivières
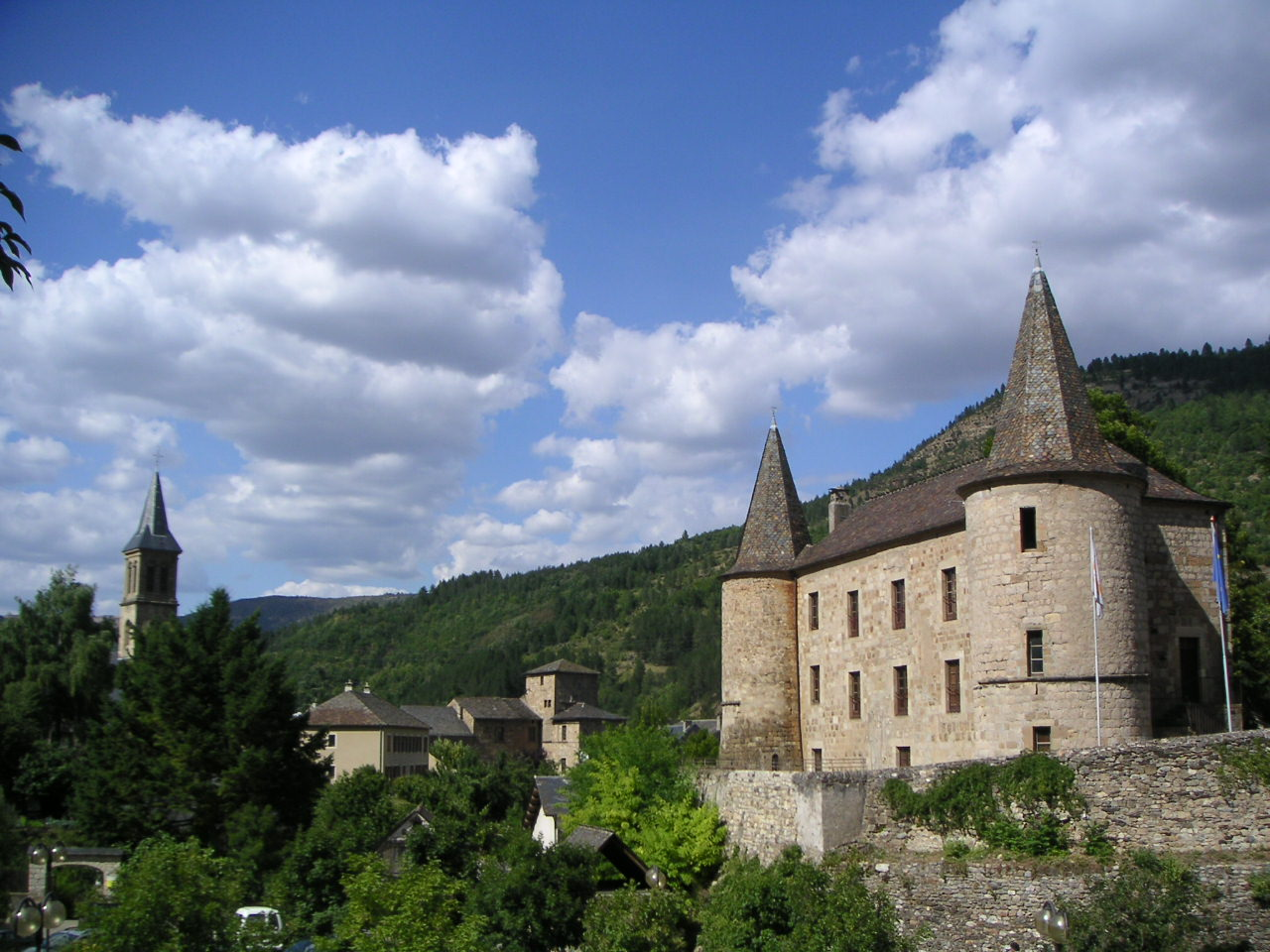
- Florac castle

- Coat of arms
- Location of Florac
- Location within France Location within Occitanie
- Coordinates: 44°19′38″N 3°35′57″E
- Country: France
- Region: Occitania
- Department: Lozère
- Arrondissement: Florac
- Canton: Florac
- Commune: Florac-Trois-Rivières
- Area^{1}: 29.89 km^{2} (11.54 sq mi)
- Elevation: 542 m (1,778 ft)
- Highest elevation: 1,141 m (3,743 ft)
- Lowest elevation: 522 m (1,713 ft)
- Population (2019): 1,889
  - Density: 63.20/km^{2} (163.7/sq mi)
- Time zone: UTC+01:00 (CET)
  - Summer (DST): UTC+02:00 (CEST)
- Postal code: 48400
- ^{1} French Land Register data, which excludes lakes, ponds, glaciers > 1 km^{2} (0.386 sq mi or 247 acres) and river estuaries.

Florac is a former commune of the Lozère department in southern France. On 1 January 2016, it was merged into the new commune of Florac-Trois-Rivières.

== History ==
=== Medieval ===
Raymond of Anduze held the barony of Florac and is recorded as using the castle there in the 13th century. In 1363 local-born Pope Urban V lent the town 300 florins for the construction of ramparts. Such defences were not at all unusual and offered desirable security and protection for the townspeople. These medieval city walls finally came down in 1629 after the Edict of Alès which, despite allowing some concessions for Huguenots, insisted on the pulling down of fortifications at perceived 'strongholds'.

=== 19th century ===
Florac was visited by a young Robert Louis Stevenson and features as a chapter in his droll Victorian bestseller Travels with a Donkey in the Cévennes (1879). The Robert Louis Stevenson Trail (GR 70), a popular long-distance path following Stevenson's approximate route, runs through the town. The nearby Mont Lozère is a ski resort.

== Historic buildings ==
=== Ecclesiastical ===
The French Wars of Religion resulted in the destruction of Florac's medieval Catholic church in 1561 and some time after the Revocation of the Edict of Nantes in 1685, Florac's first Protestant church was also razed.

Today there are two fairly large churches on the respective sites of the older structures. The Protestant church has a historical information plaque bearing the date 1832, while higher up the hill towards Causse Méjean the Catholic Saint-Martin's bears the date 1833.

==== Eglise Reformée de France (1832) ====
The Protestant church is at the end of the Esplanade, beneath Place de Souvenir (Remembrance Square). The first Protestant church on this site was destroyed after the Revocation of the Edict of Nantes (1685). The present church was built by public subscription over a number of years after 1825, reaching completion in 1832. In 2011 there was a major restoration project under local architect Francois Coulomb, with the result that the interior today provides a stunning example of the ideals of the first builders.

The exterior is simple neo-classical. The stone is covered in the plain dun render common to other buildings on the esplanade. There is a small bell house on top. The overall shape is neatly echoed in a modest portico of two Roman Tuscan columns, an entablature bearing the name and a simple unadorned pediment. The dominant note of the interior is light. Firstly, the walls and columns are panelled in whitewashed pine, giving a slightly New England flavour. Mostly, though, the effect of the determined simplicity is pre-Christian Roman. The only explicitly Christian decoration is the legend "Dieu est amour" painted at the 'West' end. There is a sense of civic virtue and pride in the colonnaded balconies which are a deliberate invocation of public space in Roman architecture. The space is regularly used today for services and classical music concerts.

==== St Martin's Catholic Church (1833) ====
A neo-classical temple, the deliberately imposing west facade has a high Roman Doric portico, with unfluted columns, unrendered stone and an unadorned entablature and pediment, contrasting with the modest wooden doors, stained a very dark brown. There is a plaque commemorating local-born Guillaume de Grimoard who rose to pope as Urban V (1363–70). At the front of the drive is an iron cross dated 1841. Both north and south facades are extremely plain. The stained glass windows are protected by iron grills and reinforced glass which is frosting. There is a tower at the East end.

The dark interior means the stained glass stands out. Otherwise, it is comparatively plain, with are stone walls, very likely to be reused stone from an earlier structure. There is a doorway to the vestry behind altar, and simple geometric transom glass. Against the West end wall (North side) is a very fine statue of Christ. There are two fonts: one is neoclassical black and grey marble; the second looks more like polished limestone and is standing incongruously on what looks like the base to a no-longer-existing column, very probably belonging to the former structure.

=== Military ===
A good deal of military action has taken place in and around Florac. Before 1629 the town retained a defensive wall, and the castle was used by the Barons of Anduze in the 13th century.

== Twin towns ==
Florac is twinned with:

- L'Anse-Saint-Jean, Quebec, Canada since 1984
- Arbucies, Catalonia, Spain since 1987

== See also ==
- Causse Méjean
