= Prunet =

Prunet may refer to the following places in France:

- Prunet, Ardèche, a commune in the department of Ardèche
- Prunet, Cantal, a commune in the department of Cantal
- Prunet, Haute-Garonne, a commune in the department of Haute-Garonne
- Prunet-et-Belpuig, a commune in the department of Pyrénées-Orientales
- La Salle-Prunet, a commune in the department of Lozère

and to:

- Prunet, a village in Bratovoești Commune, Dolj County, Romania
