= Hures-la-Parade =

- Commune
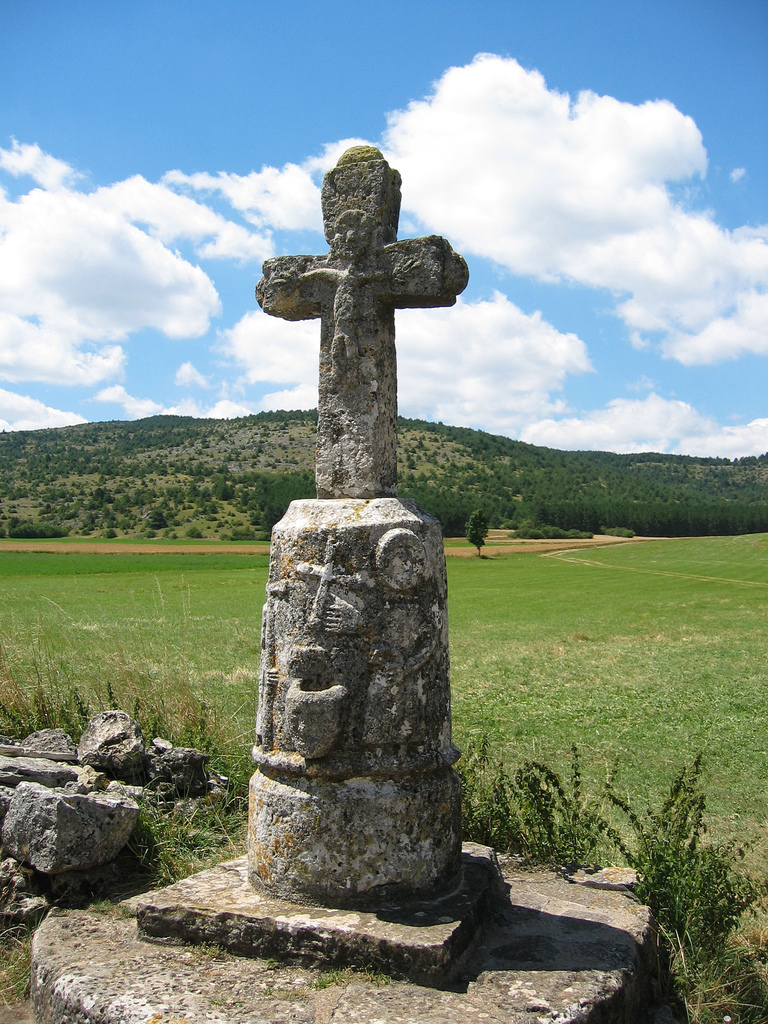
- The Croix du Buffre in Hures-la-Parade
- Location of Hures-la-Parade
- Location within France Location within Occitanie
- Coordinates: 44°14′45″N 3°21′11″E
- Country: France
- Region: Occitania
- Department: Lozère
- Arrondissement: Florac
- Canton: Florac Trois Rivières
- Intercommunality: CC Gorges Causses Cévennes

Government
  - Mayor (2021–2026): Vincent Pratlong
- Area^{1}: 88.59 km^{2} (34.20 sq mi)
- Elevation: 1,000 m (3,300 ft)
- Highest elevation: 1,204 m (3,950 ft)
- Lowest elevation: 501 m (1,644 ft)
- Population (2023): 242
  - Density: 2.73/km^{2} (7.08/sq mi)
- Time zone: UTC+01:00 (CET)
  - Summer (DST): UTC+02:00 (CEST)
- INSEE/Postal code: 48074 /48150
- ^{1} French Land Register data, which excludes lakes, ponds, glaciers > 1 km^{2} (0.386 sq mi or 247 acres) and river estuaries.

Hures-la-Parade (French pronunciation: [yʁ la paʁad]; Occitan: Ura e la Parada) is a commune in the Lozère department in southern France.

== Geography ==
Hures-la-Parade is situated on the Causse Méjean in the southeastern part of the Lozère department. It was created in 1971 after the fusion of the old communes of Hures and La Parade. With less than three inhabitants per square kilometer, it is one of the least densely populated French communes. The commune's southern border is delineated by the gorges of the Jonte river, which also form the border with the neighboring Aveyron department.

== Nature ==
The territory of the commune houses three officially recognized natural sites:

- The Aven Armand cave, located in the southern part of the commune and known for its large stalagmites.
- The Grotte Amélineau cave, unopened to the public.
- The gorges of the Jonte river

A group of Przewalski horses was released near the hamlet of Le Villaret in 2004 with the aim of preparing them for their eventual reintroduction in Western Mongolia.

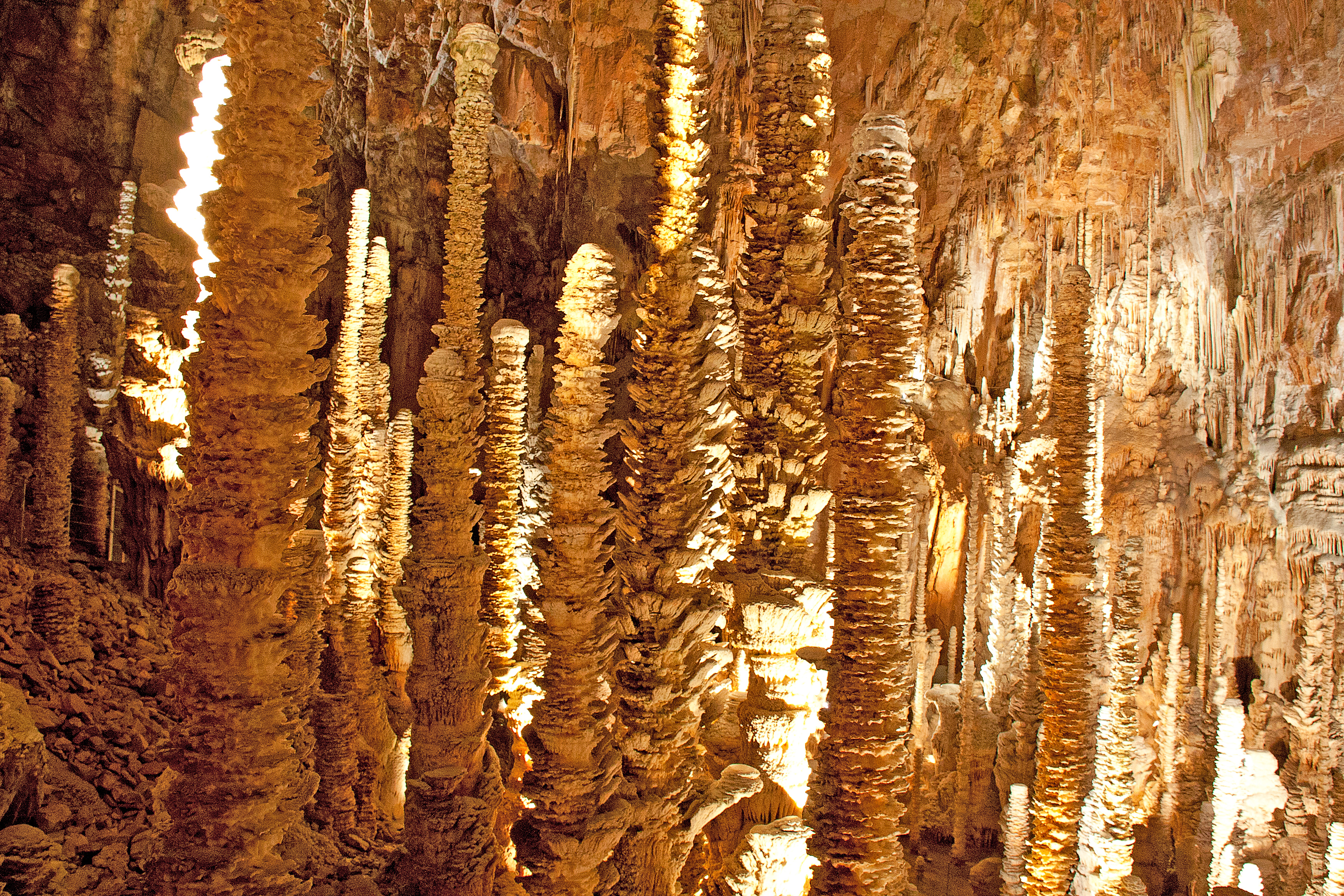
The stalagmites of the Aven Armand

== See also ==
- Communes of the Lozère department
- Causse Méjean
