= Peyreleau =

Commune in Occitanie, France

- Commune
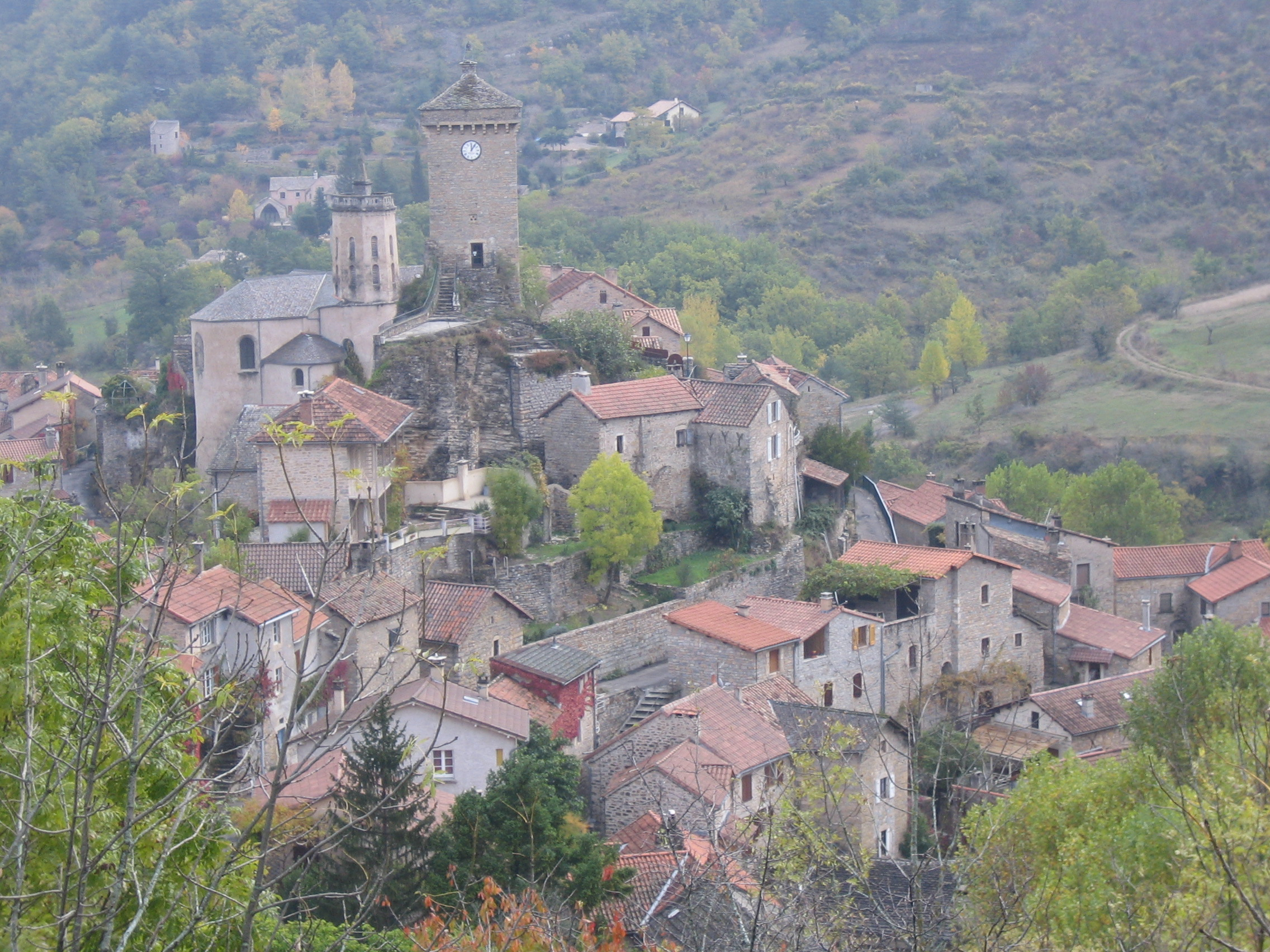
- A general view of Peyreleau

- Coat of arms
- Location of Peyreleau
- Location within France Location within Occitanie
- Coordinates: 44°11′21″N 3°12′33″E
- Country: France
- Region: Occitania
- Department: Aveyron
- Arrondissement: Millau
- Canton: Tarn et Causses
- Intercommunality: Millau Grands Causses

Government
  - Mayor (2022–2026): Alain Rouget
- Area^{1}: 16.14 km^{2} (6.23 sq mi)
- Elevation: 400 m (1,300 ft)
- Highest elevation: 882 m (2,894 ft)
- Lowest elevation: 392 m (1,286 ft)
- Population (2023): 69
  - Density: 4.3/km^{2} (11/sq mi)
- Time zone: UTC+01:00 (CET)
  - Summer (DST): UTC+02:00 (CEST)
- INSEE/Postal code: 12180 /12720
- ^{1} French Land Register data, which excludes lakes, ponds, glaciers > 1 km^{2} (0.386 sq mi or 247 acres) and river estuaries.

Peyreleau (French pronunciation: [pɛʁlo]; Occitan: Peiralèu) is a commune in the Aveyron department in southern France. It lies on the river Jonte, close to its confluence with the Tarn.

== Population ==
Historical population
Year	Pop.	±% p.a.
1968	95	—
1975	110	+2.12%
1982	100	−1.35%
1990	77	−3.21%
1999	70	−1.05%
2007	70	+0.00%
2012	82	+3.22%
2017	74	−2.03%
2023	69	−1.16%
Source: INSEE

== See also ==
- Communes of the Aveyron department
