= La Salle-Prunet =

- Part of Florac-Trois-Rivières
- Location of La Salle-Prunet
- Location within France Location within Occitanie
- Coordinates: 44°19′02″N 3°36′51″E
- Country: France
- Region: Occitania
- Department: Lozère
- Arrondissement: Florac
- Canton: Florac
- Commune: Florac-Trois-Rivières
- Area^{1}: 18.50 km^{2} (7.14 sq mi)
- Elevation: 590 m (1,940 ft)
- Highest elevation: 1,179 m (3,868 ft)
- Lowest elevation: 552 m (1,811 ft)
- Population (2019): 178
  - Density: 9.62/km^{2} (24.9/sq mi)
- Time zone: UTC+01:00 (CET)
  - Summer (DST): UTC+02:00 (CEST)
- Postal code: 48400
- ^{1} French Land Register data, which excludes lakes, ponds, glaciers > 1 km^{2} (0.386 sq mi or 247 acres) and river estuaries.

La Salle-Prunet (French pronunciation: [la sal pʁynɛ]; Occitan: La Sala) is a former commune in the Lozère department in southern France. On 1 January 2016, it was merged into the new commune of Florac-Trois-Rivières. Its population was 178 in 2019.

== See also ==
- Communes of the Lozère department
