= Ispagnac =

- Commune
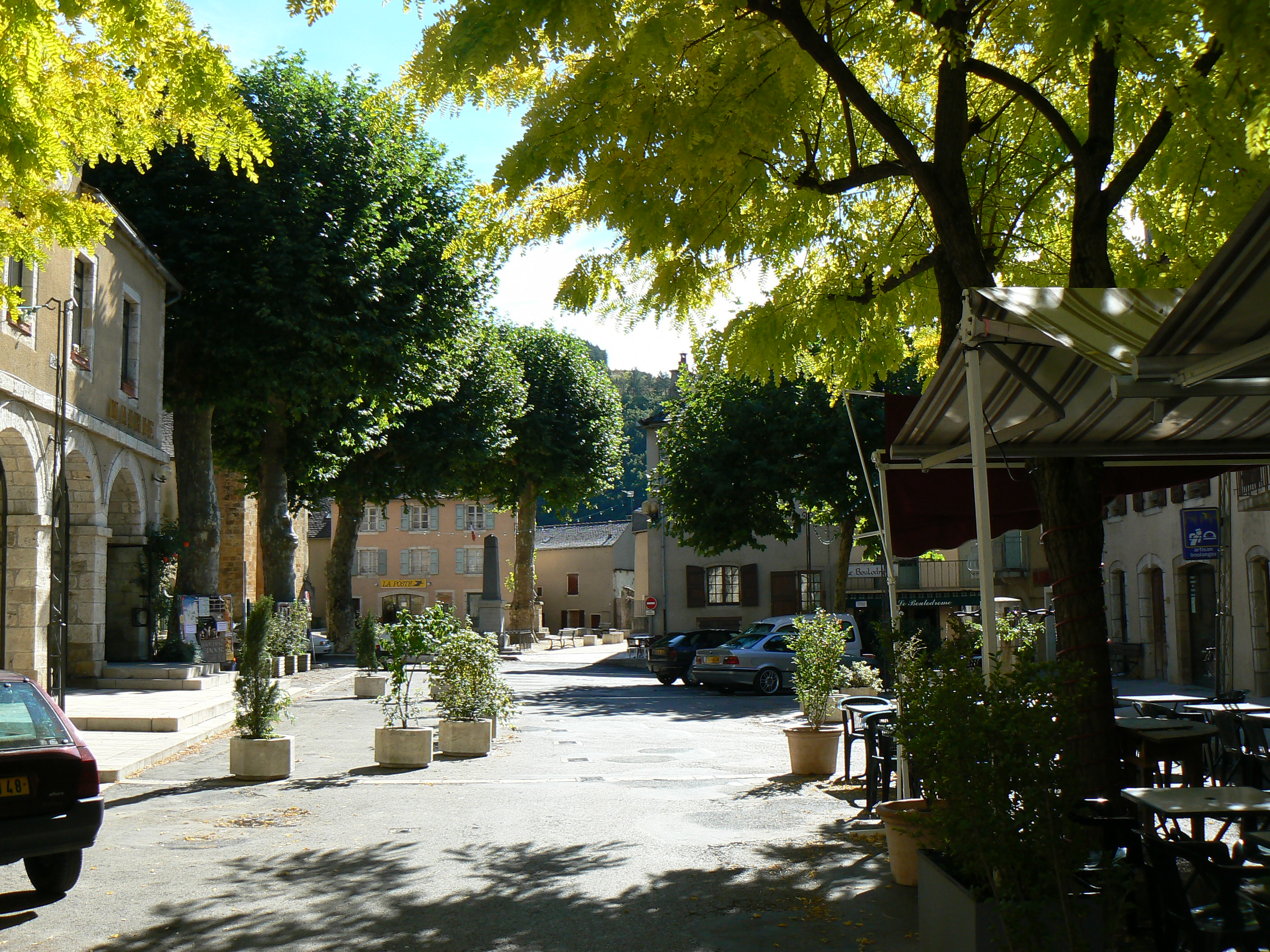
- The centre of the village of Ispagnac

- Coat of arms
- Location of Ispagnac
- Location within France Location within Occitanie
- Coordinates: 44°22′17″N 3°32′11″E
- Country: France
- Region: Occitania
- Department: Lozère
- Arrondissement: Florac
- Canton: Florac Trois Rivières
- Intercommunality: CC Gorges Causses Cévennes

Government
  - Mayor (2020–2026): Gérard Pédrini
- Area^{1}: 53.71 km^{2} (20.74 sq mi)
- Elevation: 518 m (1,699 ft)
- Highest elevation: 1,233 m (4,045 ft)
- Lowest elevation: 499 m (1,637 ft)
- Population (2023): 895
  - Density: 16.7/km^{2} (43.2/sq mi)
- Time zone: UTC+01:00 (CET)
  - Summer (DST): UTC+02:00 (CEST)
- INSEE/Postal code: 48075 /48320
- ^{1} French Land Register data, which excludes lakes, ponds, glaciers > 1 km^{2} (0.386 sq mi or 247 acres) and river estuaries.

Ispagnac (French pronunciation: [ispaɲak]; Occitan: Espanhac) is a commune in the Lozère department in southern France.

== See also ==
- Communes of the Lozère department
