= Louis Laget =

French politician

Louis Laget (30 September 1821, Meyrueis – 28 November 1882) was a French republican politician. He was a member of the National Assembly from 1871 to 1876 and a Senator from 1876 to 1882.

== Biography ==
After the coup d'état of December 2, 1851, he was sentenced to deportation to Algeria.

He practiced law, served as president of the Nîmes Bar Association (1862–1864), and pursued a career in the prefectural service. At the same time, he served as a deputy and senator for the Gard department, representing the Republican Union (France). He died while in office in 1882.
