= Causse Méjean =

Plateau in southern France

Coordinates: 44.2600°N 3.4000°E

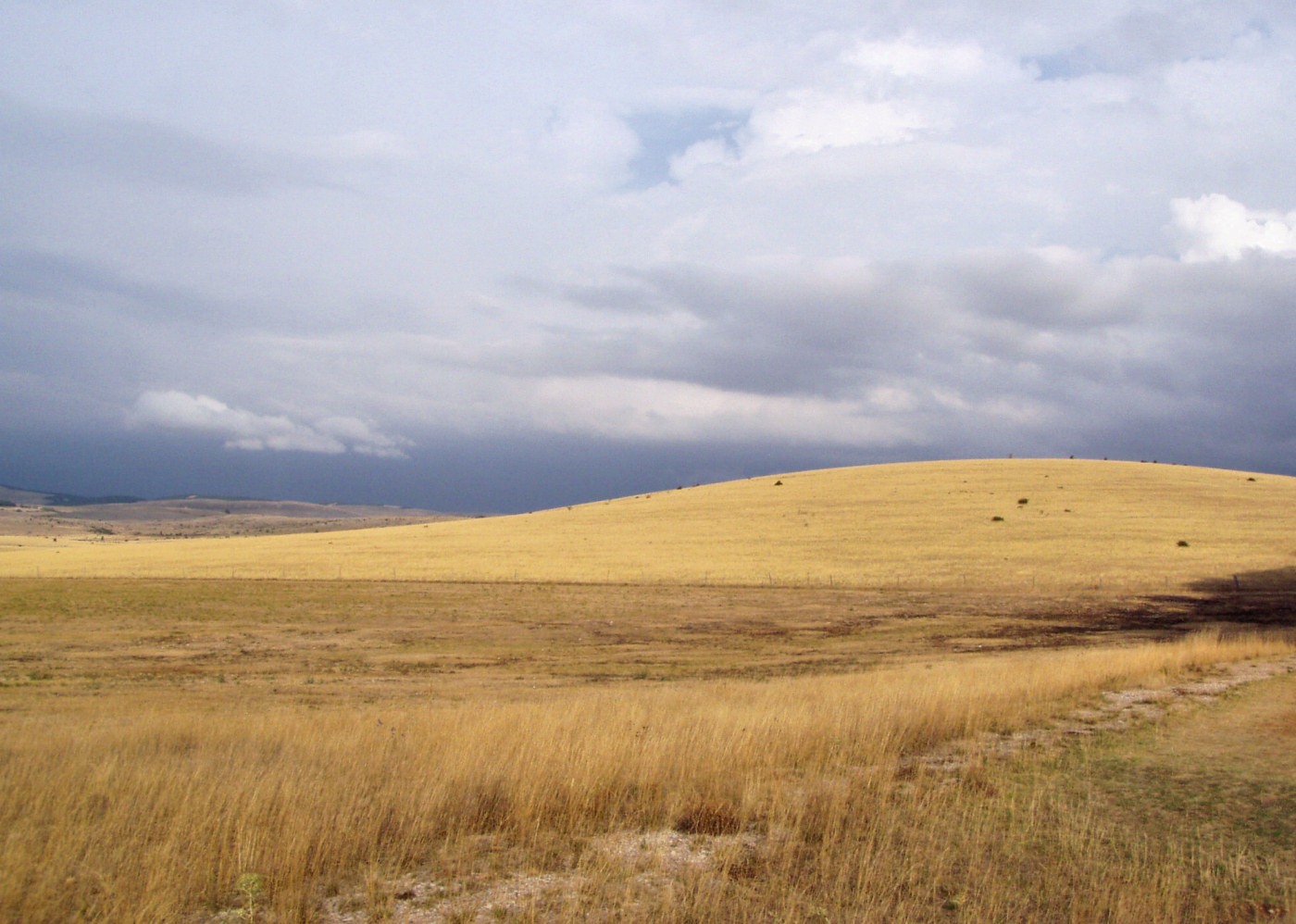
Landscape of Causse Méjean

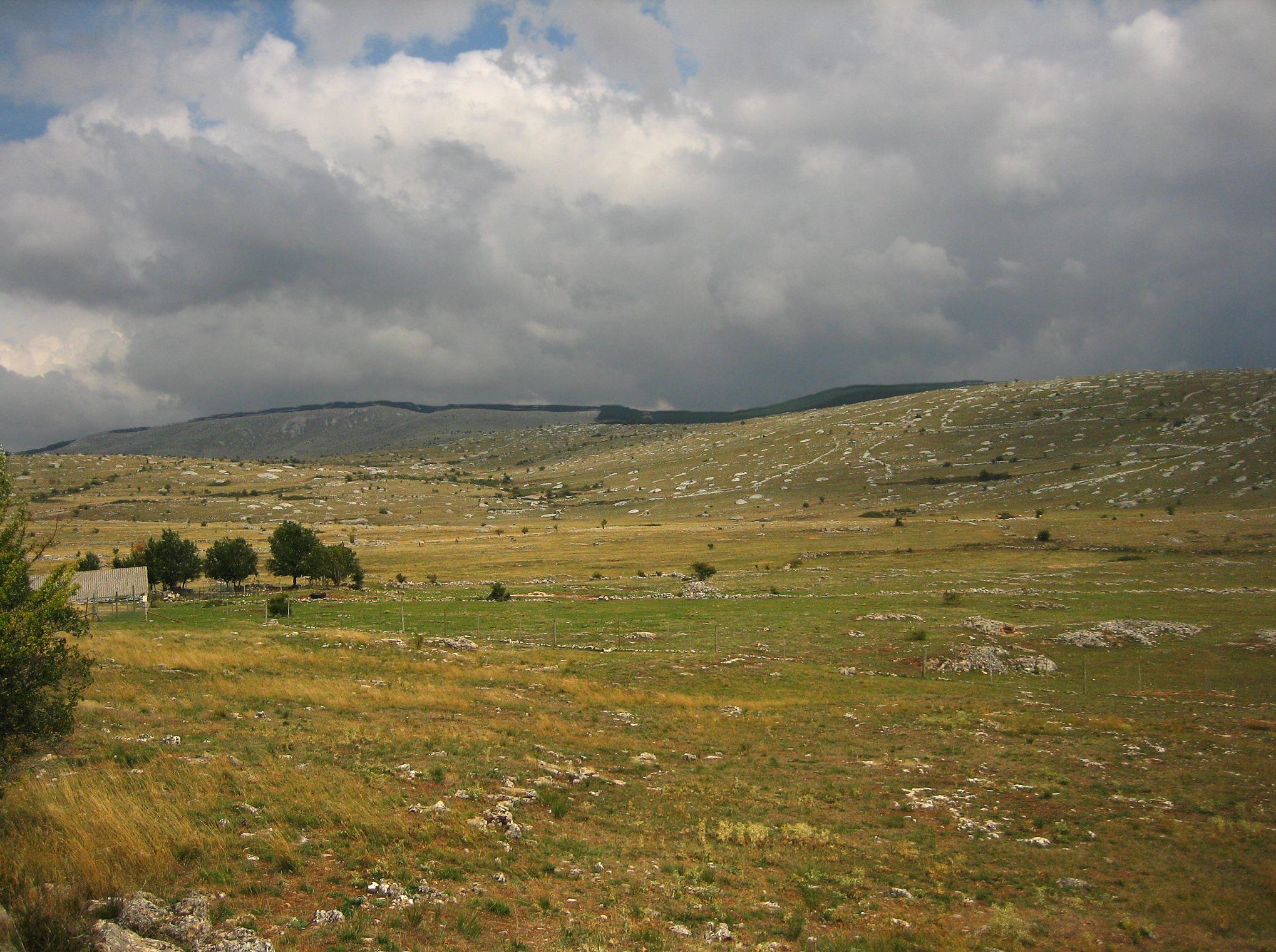
Landscape of Causse Méjean

Causse Méjean is a limestone plateau in the Lozère department, in southern France. It is a part of The Causses and the Cévennes, Mediterranean agro-pastoral Cultural Landscape UNESCO World Heritage Site.

== Communes ==
Causse Méjan is part of 13 communes in Lozère:

- Hures-la-Parade
- Meyrueis
- Les Vignes
- Montbrun
- Florac
- Le Mas-Saint-Chély
- Gatuzières
- Fraissinet-de-Fourques
- Vebron
- Saint-Laurent-de-Trèves
- Le Rozier
- Saint-Pierre-des-Tripiers
- La Malène

== See also ==
- Causses
- Gorges du Tarn
- Cévennes National Park
