= Le Rozier =

- Commune
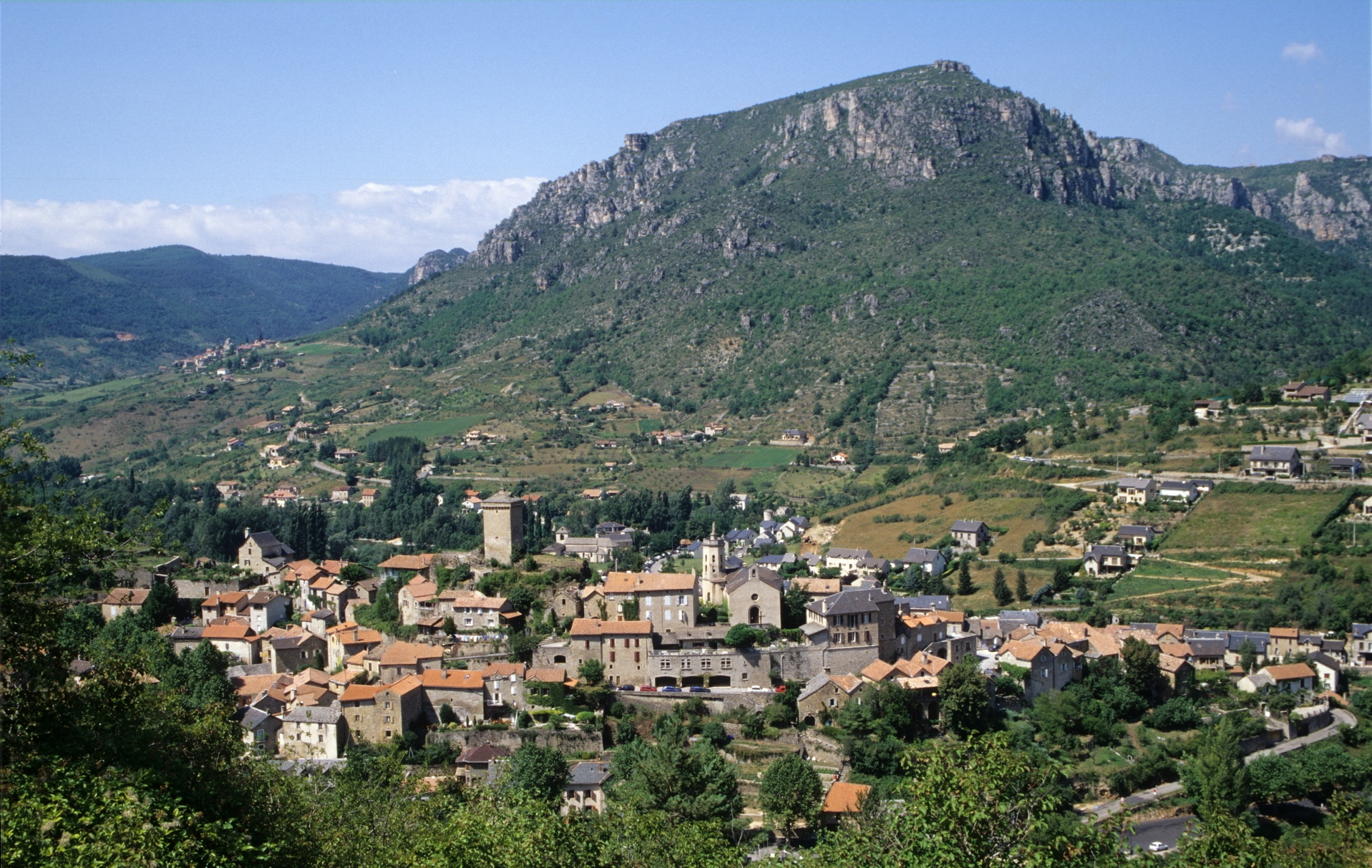
- A general view of Le Rozier

- Coat of arms
- Location of Le Rozier
- Location within France Location within Occitanie
- Coordinates: 44°11′30″N 3°12′39″E
- Country: France
- Region: Occitania
- Department: Lozère
- Arrondissement: Florac
- Canton: Florac Trois Rivières

Government
  - Mayor (2020–2026): Arnaud Curvelier
- Area^{1}: 2.03 km^{2} (0.78 sq mi)
- Elevation: 400 m (1,300 ft)
- Highest elevation: 849 m (2,785 ft)
- Lowest elevation: 387 m (1,270 ft)
- Population (2023): 126
  - Density: 62.1/km^{2} (161/sq mi)
- Time zone: UTC+01:00 (CET)
  - Summer (DST): UTC+02:00 (CEST)
- INSEE/Postal code: 48131 /48150
- ^{1} French Land Register data, which excludes lakes, ponds, glaciers > 1 km^{2} (0.386 sq mi or 247 acres) and river estuaries.

Le Rozier (French pronunciation: [lə ʁozje]; Occitan: Lo Rosièr) is a commune in the Lozère department in southern France.

== Geography ==
The river Jonte joins the Tarn in Le Rozier.

== See also ==
- Communes of the Lozère department
- Causse Méjean
