= Florac Trois Rivières =

Florac Trois Rivières Florac-Tres-Rius (Occitan)
- Subprefecture and commune
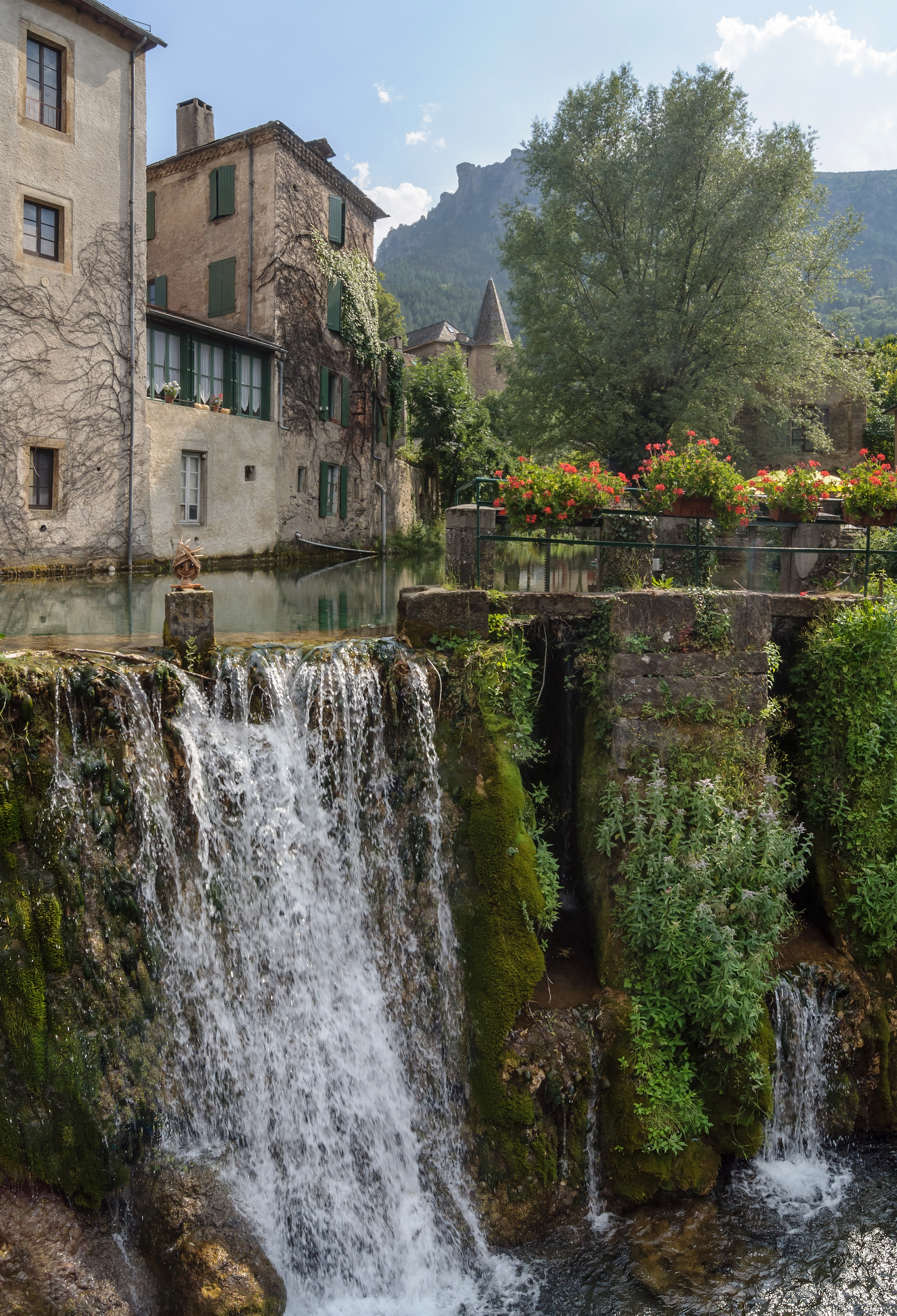
- Location of Florac Trois Rivières
- Location within France Location within Occitanie
- Coordinates: 44°19′26″N 3°35′38″E
- Country: France
- Region: Occitania
- Department: Lozère
- Arrondissement: Florac
- Canton: Florac Trois Rivières
- Intercommunality: Gorges Causses Cévennes

Government
  - Mayor (2020–2026): Flore Thérond
- Area^{1}: 48.39 km^{2} (18.68 sq mi)
- Population (2023): 2,100
  - Density: 43/km^{2} (110/sq mi)
- Time zone: UTC+01:00 (CET)
  - Summer (DST): UTC+02:00 (CEST)
- INSEE/Postal code: 48061 /48400
- ^{1} French Land Register data, which excludes lakes, ponds, glaciers > 1 km^{2} (0.386 sq mi or 247 acres) and river estuaries.

Florac Trois Rivières (French pronunciation: [flɔʁak tʁwɑ ʁivjɛʁ], literally 'Florac Three Rivers'; Occitan: Florac-Tres-Rius) is a commune in the department of Lozère, southern France. The municipality was established on 1 January 2016 by merger of the former communes of Florac and La Salle-Prunet. It is the seat (sous-préfecture) of the arrondissement of Florac.

Florac is listed as a Village étape.

== Population ==
Population data refer to the commune in its geography as of January 2025.

Historical population
Year	Pop.	±% p.a.
1968	1,842	—
1975	2,090	+1.82%
1982	2,171	+0.54%
1990	2,180	+0.05%
1999	2,125	−0.28%
2007	2,058	−0.40%
2012	2,139	+0.78%
2017	2,075	−0.61%
2023	2,100	+0.20%
Source: INSEE

== See also ==
- Communes of the Lozère department
