= Mas-Saint-Chély =

- Commune
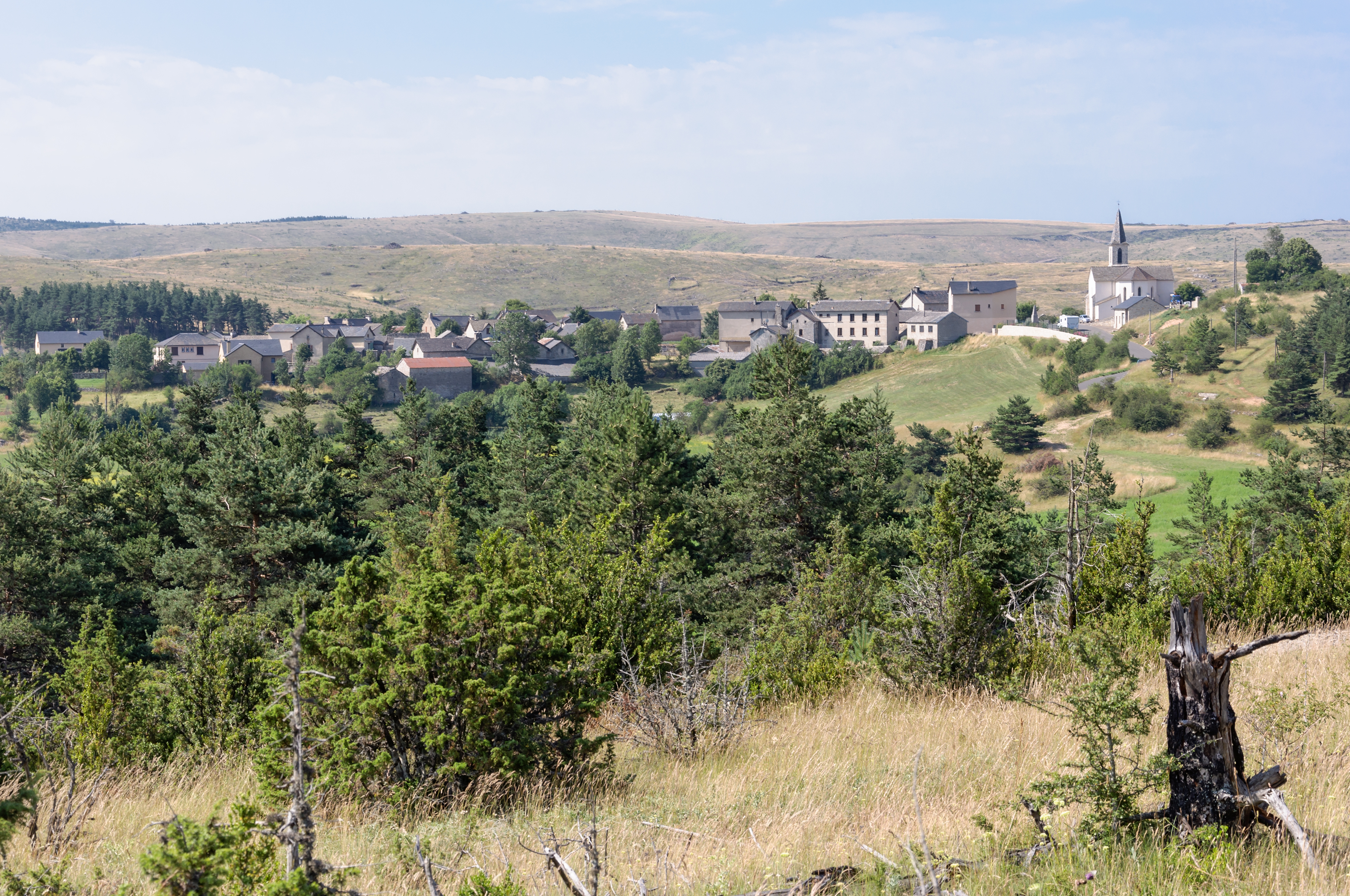
- Mas-Saint-Chely on Causse Méjean
- Location of Mas-Saint-Chély
- Location within France Location within Occitanie
- Coordinates: 44°18′35″N 3°23′48″E
- Country: France
- Region: Occitania
- Department: Lozère
- Arrondissement: Florac
- Canton: Florac Trois Rivières
- Intercommunality: Gorges Causses Cévennes

Government
  - Mayor (2022–2026): Gilles Vergely
- Area^{1}: 56.81 km^{2} (21.93 sq mi)
- Elevation: 450 m (1,480 ft)
- Highest elevation: 1,156 m (3,793 ft)
- Lowest elevation: 800 m (2,600 ft)
- Population (2023): 112
  - Density: 1.97/km^{2} (5.11/sq mi)
- Time zone: UTC+01:00 (CET)
  - Summer (DST): UTC+02:00 (CEST)
- INSEE/Postal code: 48141 /48210
- ^{1} French Land Register data, which excludes lakes, ponds, glaciers > 1 km^{2} (0.386 sq mi or 247 acres) and river estuaries.

Mas-Saint-Chély (French pronunciation: [ma(s) sɛ̃ ʃeli]; Occitan: Sench Èli or Sench Eli) is a commune in the Lozère department in southern France.

== See also ==
- Communes of the Lozère department
- Causse Méjean
