= Gatuzières =

- Commune
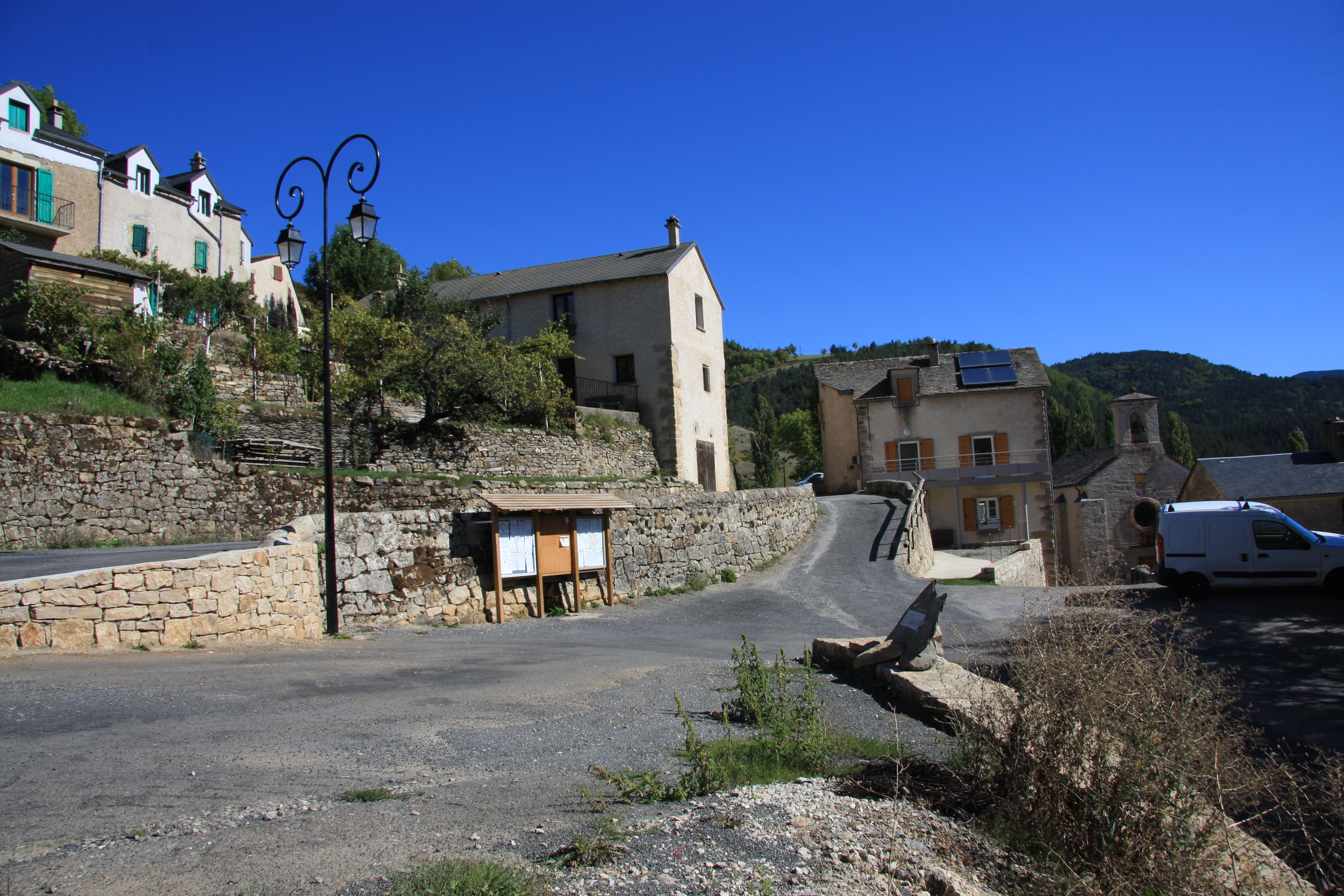
- A view within Gatuzières

- Coat of arms
- Location of Gatuzières
- Location within France Location within Occitanie
- Coordinates: 44°11′58″N 3°29′26″E
- Country: France
- Region: Occitania
- Department: Lozère
- Arrondissement: Florac
- Canton: Florac Trois Rivières
- Intercommunality: CC Gorges Causses Cévennes

Government
  - Mayor (2020–2026): Michel Commandre
- Area^{1}: 29.40 km^{2} (11.35 sq mi)
- Elevation: 825 m (2,707 ft)
- Highest elevation: 1,562 m (5,125 ft)
- Lowest elevation: 759 m (2,490 ft)
- Population (2023): 52
  - Density: 1.8/km^{2} (4.6/sq mi)
- Time zone: UTC+01:00 (CET)
  - Summer (DST): UTC+02:00 (CEST)
- INSEE/Postal code: 48069 /48150
- ^{1} French Land Register data, which excludes lakes, ponds, glaciers > 1 km^{2} (0.386 sq mi or 247 acres) and river estuaries.

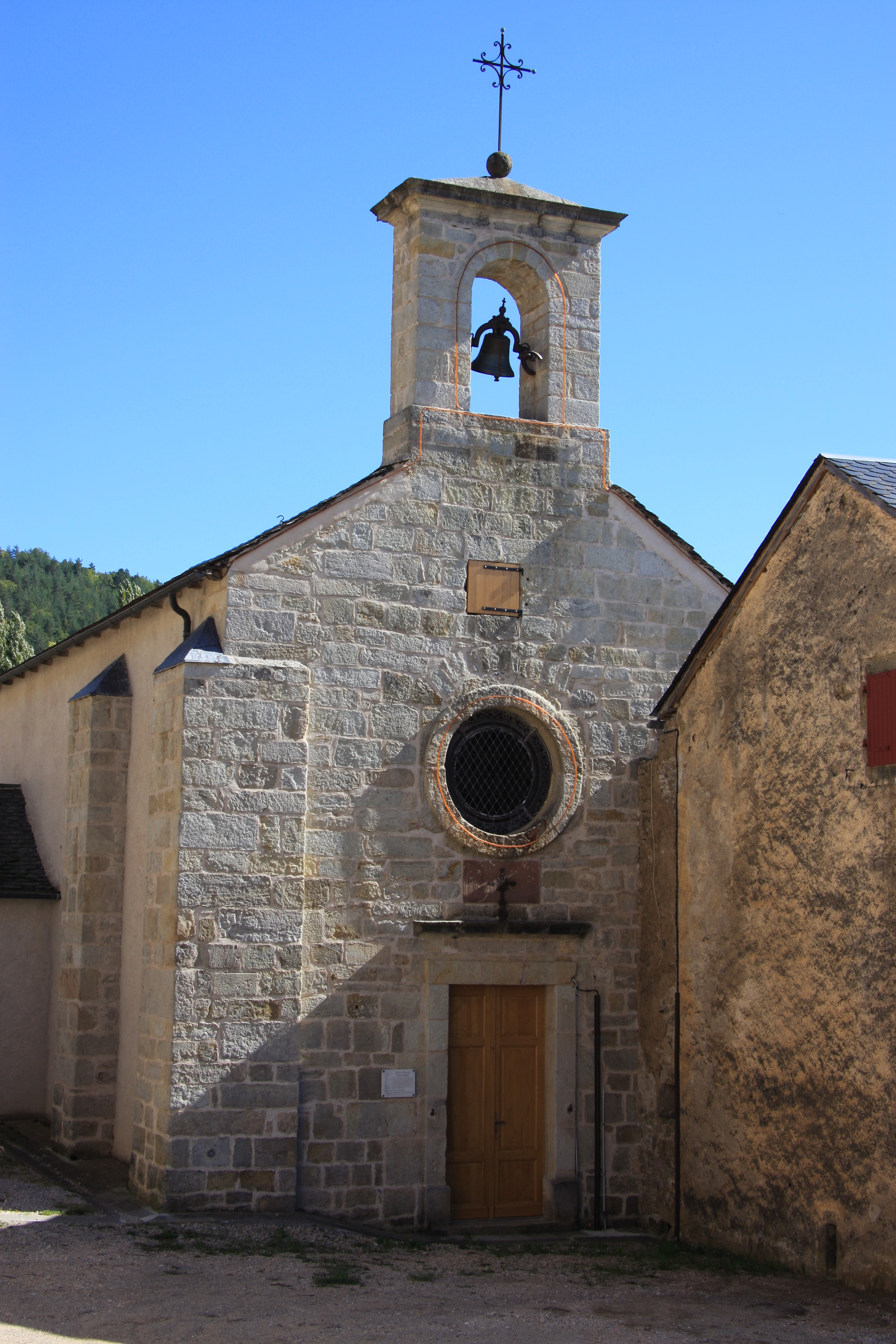
Church of Notre-Dame in Gatuzières.

Gatuzières (French pronunciation: [ɡatyzjɛʁ]; Occitan: Gatusièiras) is a commune in the Lozère department in southern France.

== See also ==
- Communes of the Lozère department
- Causse Méjean
