= Saint-Pierre-des-Tripiers =

- Commune
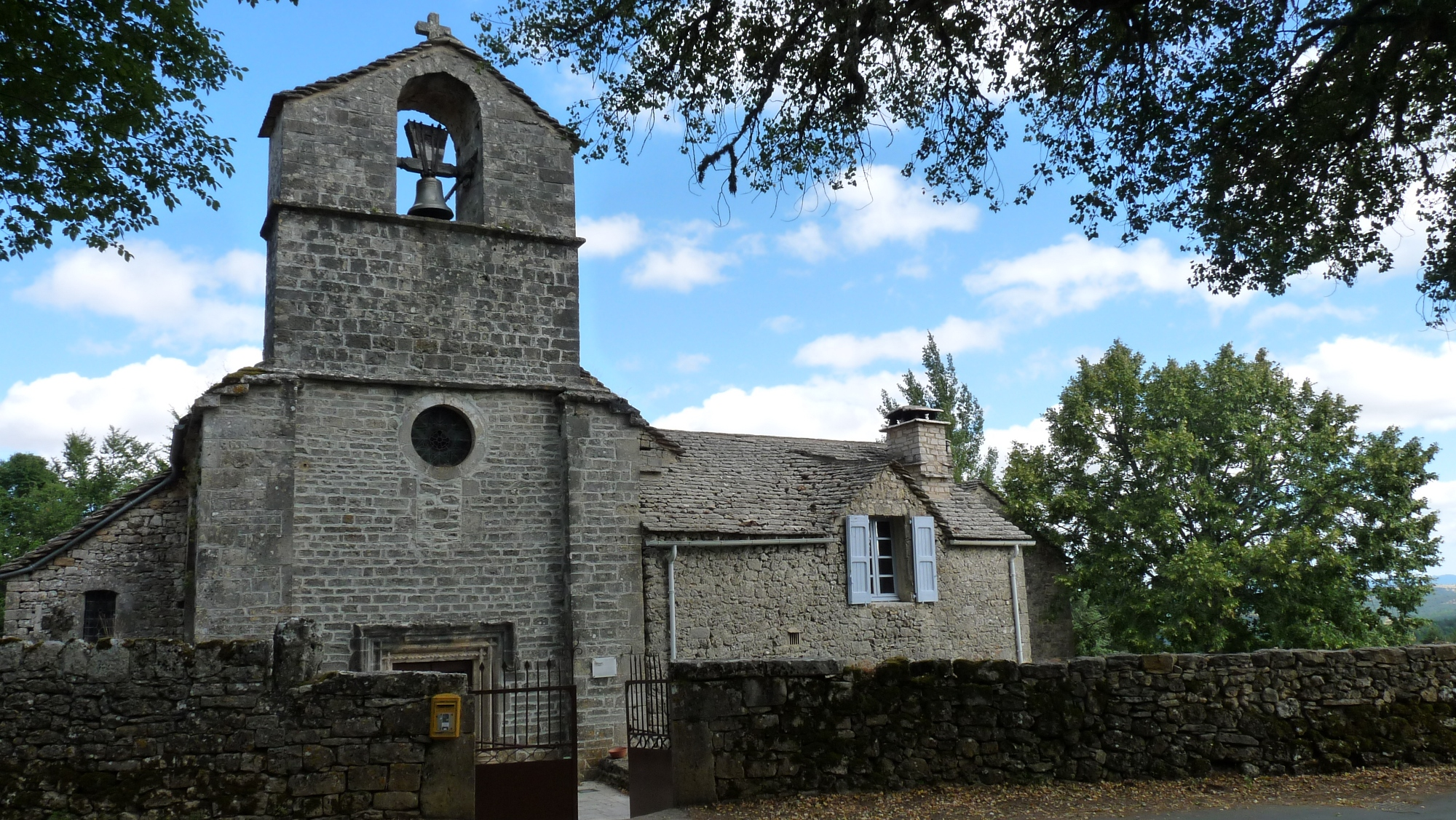
- The church in Saint-Pierre-des-Tripiers

- Coat of arms
- Location of Saint-Pierre-des-Tripiers
- Location within France Location within Occitanie
- Coordinates: 44°12′01″N 3°15′30″E
- Country: France
- Region: Occitania
- Department: Lozère
- Arrondissement: Florac
- Canton: Florac Trois Rivières
- Intercommunality: CC Gorges Causses Cévennes

Government
  - Mayor (2020–2026): Emmanuel Adely
- Area^{1}: 34.74 km^{2} (13.41 sq mi)
- Elevation: 925 m (3,035 ft)
- Highest elevation: 1,065 m (3,494 ft)
- Lowest elevation: 392 m (1,286 ft)
- Population (2023): 99
  - Density: 2.8/km^{2} (7.4/sq mi)
- Time zone: UTC+01:00 (CET)
  - Summer (DST): UTC+02:00 (CEST)
- INSEE/Postal code: 48176 /48150
- ^{1} French Land Register data, which excludes lakes, ponds, glaciers > 1 km^{2} (0.386 sq mi or 247 acres) and river estuaries.

Saint-Pierre-des-Tripiers (French pronunciation: [sɛ̃ pjɛʁ de tʁipje]; Occitan: Sant Pèire d'Estripians) is a commune in the Lozère department in Occitanie, southern France.

== See also ==
- Communes of the Lozère department
- Causse Méjean
