= Aven Armand =

Cave

Coordinates: 44°13′16″N 3°21′26″E

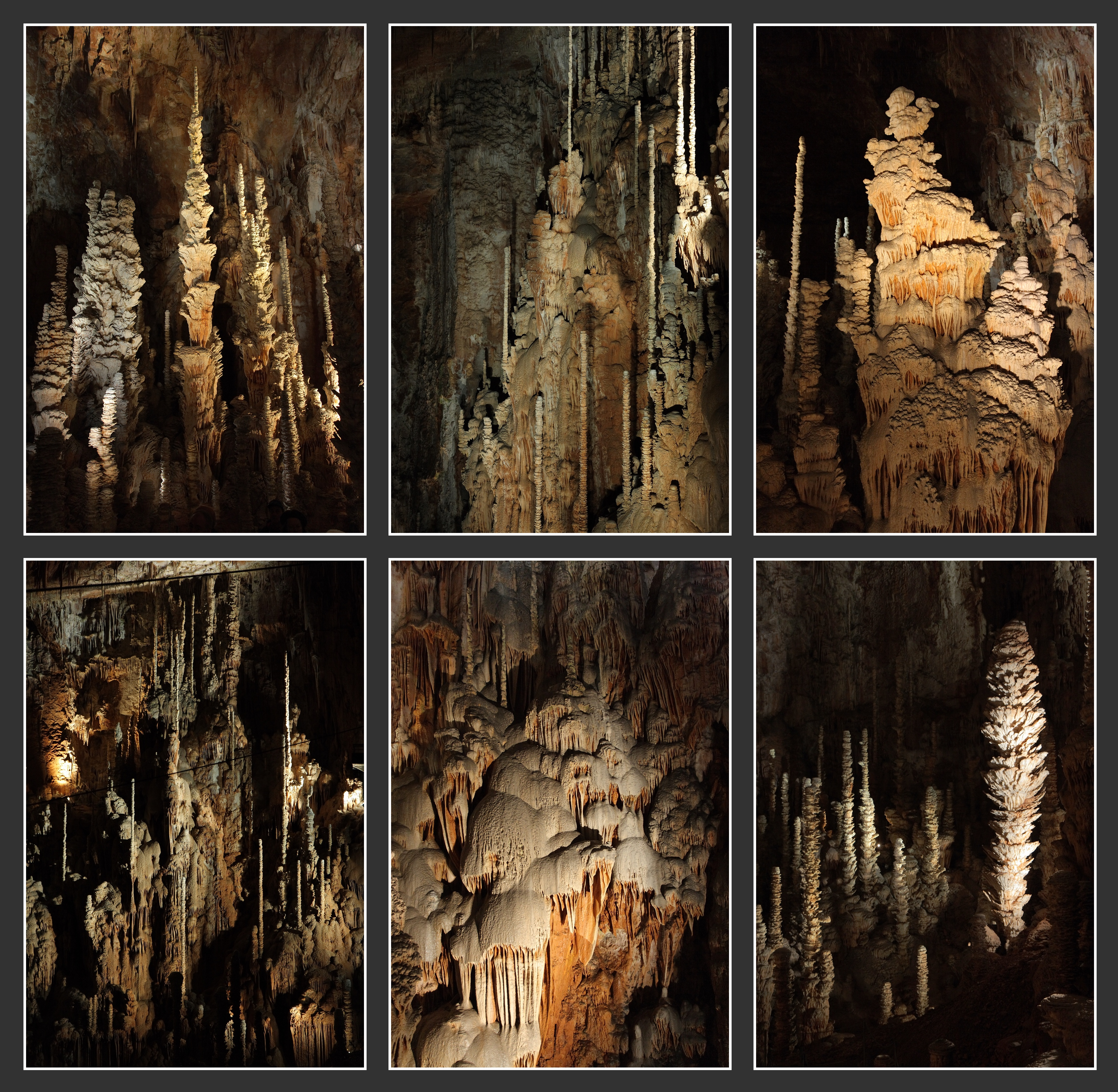
Some stalagmites featured in the Aven Armand cave

Aven Armand is a limestone cave located in the Cévennes National Park of France, in the Lozère département, between Meyrueis and Sainte-Enimie known for the tallest known stalagmite of 30 meters.

== History ==
It was first scientifically explored by the French explorers Louis Armand and Édouard-Alfred Martel in 1897. The cave begins as a narrow pit, descending 75 metres (246 ft) before opening up into an enormous vaulted chamber known as the Grand Salle, or "Great Hall".

The Grand Salle is close to 100 metres (330 ft) long and 55 metres (180 ft) wide. The floor is covered with a proliferation of fragile limestone speleothems in a variety of shapes and sizes, created by the slow dripping of water through the stone over thousands of years. Some have reached heights of close to 30 metres (98 ft).

It has been open to the public since 1927, after a man-made tunnel and walkway paths were created to permit easier viewing of the Grand Salle.

== In popular culture ==
In June 2017, French singer Nolwenn Leroy used the Aven Armand cave as a setting for the music video of her single "Gemme".

The Aven Armand cave was the site of the Murder in Lozère 2014 TV movie.
