= La Malène =

- Commune
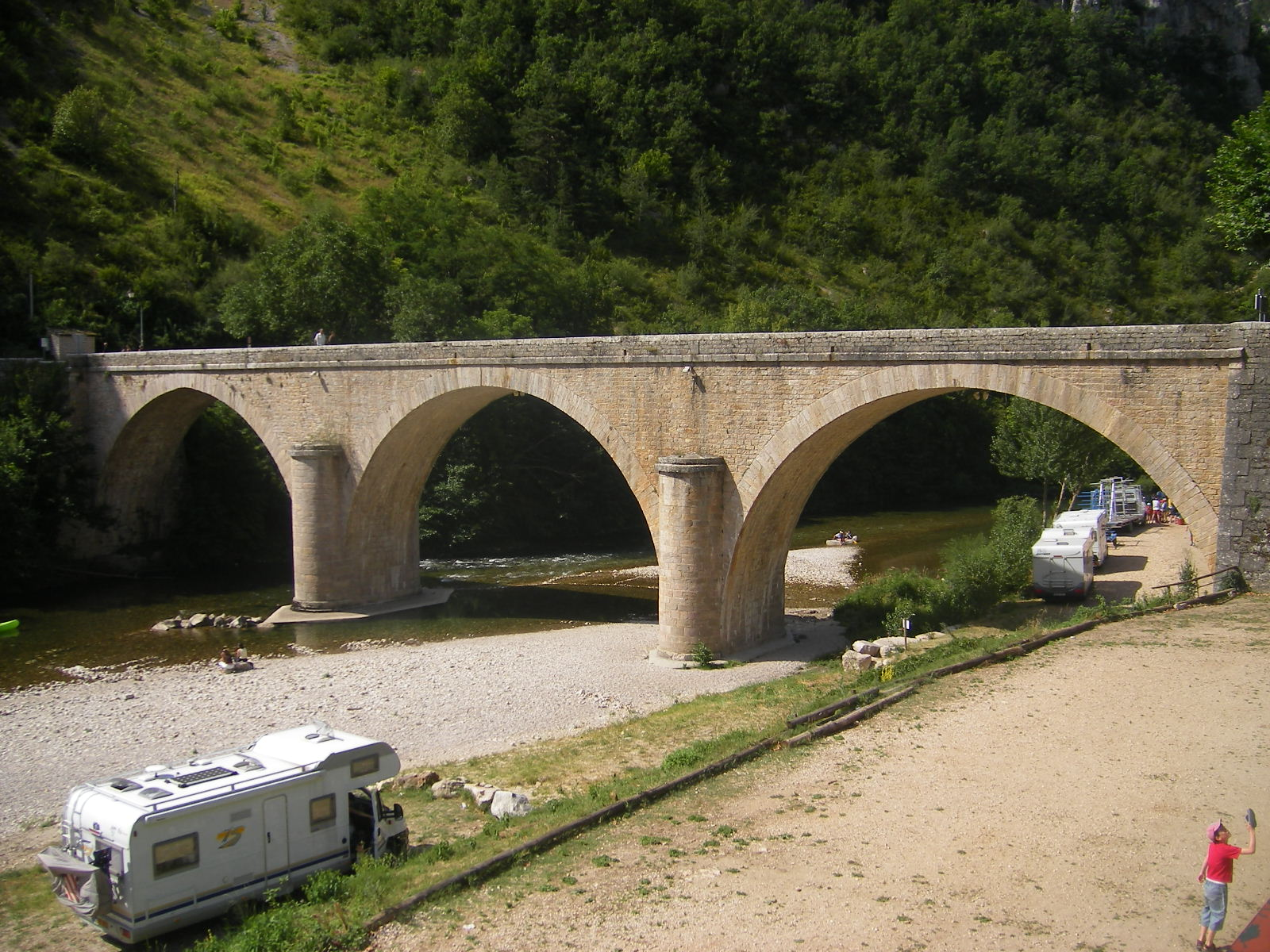
- Bridge over the river Tarn in La Malène

- Coat of arms
- Location of La Malène
- Location within France Location within Occitanie
- Coordinates: 44°18′11″N 3°19′16″E
- Country: France
- Region: Occitania
- Department: Lozère
- Arrondissement: Florac
- Canton: La Canourgue
- Intercommunality: Gorges Causses Cévennes

Government
  - Mayor (2020–2026): Regine Doussiere
- Area^{1}: 40.68 km^{2} (15.71 sq mi)
- Elevation: 452 m (1,483 ft)
- Highest elevation: 1,012 m (3,320 ft)
- Lowest elevation: 438 m (1,437 ft)
- Population (2023): 130
  - Density: 3.2/km^{2} (8.3/sq mi)
- Time zone: UTC+01:00 (CET)
  - Summer (DST): UTC+02:00 (CEST)
- INSEE/Postal code: 48088 /48210
- ^{1} French Land Register data, which excludes lakes, ponds, glaciers > 1 km^{2} (0.386 sq mi or 247 acres) and river estuaries.

La Malène (French pronunciation: [la malɛn]; Occitan: La Malena) is a commune in the Lozère department in southern France.

== See also ==
- Communes of the Lozère department
- Causse Méjean
- Gorges du Tarn
