= Jonte (river) =

River in southern France

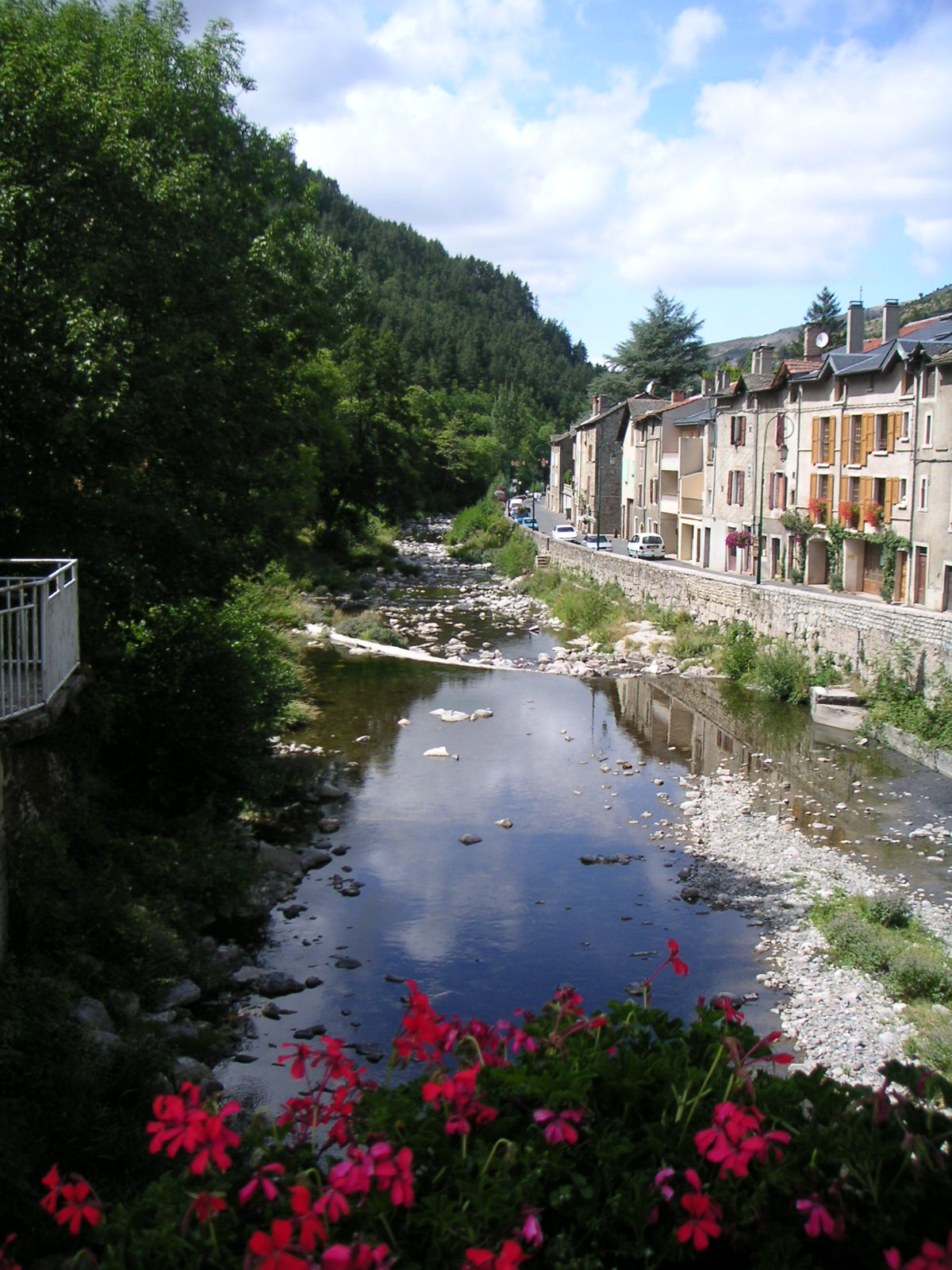
- The Jonte at Meyrueis

- Location within France Location within Occitanie

Location
- Country: France

Physical characteristics
- Mouth: Tarn
  - coordinates: 44.1935°N 3.2036°E
- Length: 38.6 km (24.0 mi)

Basin features
- Progression: Tarn→ Garonne→ Gironde estuary→ Atlantic Ocean

The Jonte is a 38.6 km (24.0 mi) river in southern France. It flows through the departments of Lozère and Aveyron. It is a tributary of the Tarn, which it joins in Le Rozier.

Departments and communes along the river:

- Lozère: Meyrueis, Le Rozier
- Aveyron: Peyreleau
