= Canton of Florac Trois Rivières =

Coordinates: 44.33°N 3.59°E

The canton of Florac Trois Rivières (Previously: canton of Florac) is an administrative division of the Lozère department, southern France. Its borders were modified at the French canton reorganisation which came into effect in March 2015. Its seat is in Florac Trois Rivières.

It consists of the following communes:

1. Florac Trois Rivières
2. Gatuzières
3. Gorges du Tarn Causses
4. Hures-la-Parade
5. Ispagnac
6. Mas-Saint-Chély
7. Meyrueis
8. Le Rozier
9. Saint-Pierre-des-Tripiers
