= Flat =

Flat or flats may refer to:

== Architecture ==
- Apartment, known as a flat in the United Kingdom, Ireland, and other Commonwealth countries

== Arts and entertainment ==
- Flat (music), a symbol (♭) which denotes a lower pitch
- Flat (soldier), a two-dimensional toy soldier made of tin or plastic
- Flat (theatre), a flat piece of theatrical scenery
- Flat, a leading type of wordplay, as identified by the National Puzzlers' League
- Flat! (2010), an Indian film
- Flats (band), an English sludge metal and punk band
- Flats (comics), the first stage in the comic coloring process

== Footwear ==
- Flats, footwear which is not high-heeled
- Ballet flats, derived from ballet shoes, for casual wear as well as dancing
- Ballet shoes (also known as ballet slippers), often referred to as "flats" or "flat shoes"
- Racing flats, lightweight shoes used primarily for running a race

== Geography ==
=== Landforms ===
- Flat (landform), a relatively level area within a region of greater relief
- Mudflat, intertidal wetland with a substrate of fine sediments

=== Bodies of water ===
- Flat, a shallow water area in the context of boating, fishing or marine biology, often used in plural form
  - Brewster Flats, an area of Cape Cod Bay off the shore of Massachusetts, U.S.
  - Kentish Flats Offshore Wind Farm, off the coast of Kent, England
  - Rhyl Flats, a wind farm off the coast of North Wales
- Flat coast, a shoreline where the land descends gradually into the sea

=== Places ===
==== United States ====
- Flat, Alaska, a census-designated place
- Flat, Kentucky, an unincorporated community
- Flat, Missouri, an unincorporated community
- Flat, Texas, an unincorporated community
- Flat Brook, a tributary of the Delaware River in Sussex County, New Jersey
- Flats, Nebraska, United States
- Flats, West Virginia, an unincorporated community
- Forest Lake Area Trail System, Missouri

==== Other ====
- Flat, Puy-de-Dôme, a commune in the French region of Auvergne
- Flat Island (disambiguation), in various places
- Flat Islands (disambiguation), in Canada and Antarctica
- Flat River (disambiguation), in the United States and Canada

== Mathematics ==
- Flat function, a real function where all derivatives at a point are 0
- Flat (geometry), the generalization of lines and planes in an n-dimensional Euclidean space
- Flat (matroids), a further generalization of flats from linear algebra to the context of matroids
- Flat module in ring theory
- Flat morphism in algebraic geometry
- Flat space, a space with zero curvature
- Flat surface (geometry), a surface with zero curvature
- Flat sign, for its use in mathematics; see musical isomorphism, mapping vectors to covectors

== People ==
=== Nickname ===
- Earl "Flat" Chase (1910–1954), Canadian baseball player
- Flat Walsh (1897–1959), Canadian ice hockey goaltender

=== Fictional characters ===
- Flat Eric, a character in some Levi's commercials
- Flat Stanley, namesake of an American children's book series

=== Groups ===
- FLATS or First Lady Astronaut Trainees, American women who underwent NASA Project Mercury physiological screening tests

== Other uses ==
- Flat (gridiron football), the area of the gridiron football field
- Flat butterflies or flats, certain skipper butterfly genera in subfamily Pyrginae:
  - Calleagris (scarce flats),
  - Celaenorrhinus of tribe Celaenorrhinini;
  - Eagris, and
  - Tagiades (water flats, snow flats), of tribe Tagiadini
- Flat (USPS), an oversized letter
- Flat (watercraft), a type of barge, especially on the River Mersey
- Flat tire, a pneumatic tire that has deflated
- Optical flat, an extremely flat piece of glass

== See also ==
- The Flat (disambiguation), including "The Flats"
- Flat Earth (disambiguation)
- Flatbed (disambiguation)
- Flatten (disambiguation)
- Flattening
- Flatness (disambiguation)
