= List of English words of Dutch origin =

This is an incomplete list of Dutch expressions used in English; some are relatively common (e.g. cookie), some are comparatively rare. In a survey by Joseph M. Williams in Origins of the English Language it is estimated that about 1% of English words are of Dutch origin.

In many cases the loanword has assumed a meaning substantially different from its Dutch forebear. Some English words have been borrowed directly from Dutch. But typically, English spellings of Dutch loanwords suppress combinations of vowels in the original word which do not exist in English, and replace them with existing vowel combinations. For example, the oe in koekje or koekie becomes oo in cookie, the ij (considered a vowel in Dutch) and the ui in vrijbuiter become ee and oo in freebooter, the aa in baas becomes o in boss, the oo in rooster becomes o in roster.

As languages, English and Dutch are both West Germanic, and descend further back from the common ancestor language Proto-Germanic. Their relationship however, has been obscured by the lexical influence of Old Norse brought in after the Viking expansion from the 9th to the 11th century, and Norman French, as a consequence of the Norman conquest of England in 1066. Because of their close common relationship – in addition to the large Latin and French vocabulary both languages possess – many English words are very similar to their Dutch lexical counterparts: either identical in spelling (plant, begin, fruit), similar in pronunciation (pool = pole, boek = book, diep = deep), or both (offer, hard, lip); or may be false friends (ramp = disaster, roof = robbery, mop = joke). These cognates, or words related in other ways related words, are excluded from this list.

Dutch expressions have been incorporated into English usage for many reasons and in different periods in time. These are some of the most common ones:

== From Old Dutch ==
- Many Latinate words in the English lexicon were borrowed from Latin. Quite a few of these words can further trace their origins back to a Germanic source - usually Old Low Franconian. Old Dutch is the western variant of this language. In cases it is not clear whether the loanword is from Old Dutch (Old West Low Franconian) or another Germanic language, they have been excluded from the list. See also: List of English Latinates of Germanic origin
- Since speakers of West Germanic languages spoken along the North Sea coast from the 5th to the 9th century lived close enough together to form a linguistic crossroads - water was the main way of transportation - Dutch and English share some traits that other West Germanic languages do not possess. Lexical examples are Dutch vijf / English five (compare German: Fünf) and Dutch leef / English live (compare German Leben). These words have been excluded from the list. See also: Ingvaeonic nasal spirant law
- Since the Norman Conquest of 1066, many Latinate words entered the English lexicon via French, which has – via Old French – a substantial base of Old Dutch (or Old Low Franconian) and Middle Dutch. For instance, French boulevard comes from Dutch bolwerk. In cases it is not clear whether the loanword in French is from Dutch or another Germanic language, they have been excluded from the list. See also: Influence of Franconian language on French

For some loanwords stemming from this period it is not always clear whether they are of Old Dutch, Old Norse, another Germanic language or an unknown Old English origin. These words have been excluded from the list, or indicated as such.

== From Middle Dutch ==
- About one-third of the invading Norman army of 1066 came from Dutch speaking Flemish. Many Flemings stayed in England after the Conquest and influenced the English language.
- The main part of refugees to England, Wales and Scotland from the 11th till the 17th century were from the Low Countries; particularly Flemish skilled weavers and textile workers immigrated as a result of floods, overpopulation and warfare in Flanders. In 1527, when England's population numbered 5 million, London alone had tens of thousands of Flemings, while an estimated third of the Scottish population has a Flemish background.

The Hanseatic League had in the late Middle Ages a trade network along the coast of Northern Europe and England, using to Dutch related Middle Low German as lingua franca. Some loanwords from this period could come from either language. These words have been excluded from the list, or indicated as such.

== From Modern Dutch ==
- In the Dutch Golden Age, spanning most of the 17th century, Dutch trade, science, military, and art were among the most acclaimed in the world, and many English words of Dutch origin concerning these areas are stemming from this period.
- English and Dutch rivalry at sea resulted in many Dutch naval terms in English.
- Via settlements in North America and elsewhere in the world Dutch language influenced English spoken there, particularly American English. That resulted also in numerous place names based on Dutch words and places. These are excluded from the list unless they are well known, like Brooklyn (from the Dutch town Breukelen) and Wall Street (from Dutch Walstraat). See also: List of place names of Dutch origin
- Due to contact between Afrikaans and English speakers in South Africa, many Dutch words entered English via Afrikaans, which has an estimated 90 to 95% vocabulary of Dutch origin. Only the words that entered standard English are listed here: Afrikaans words that do not stem from Cape Dutch but from an African, Indian or other European language, are not. See also: List of English words of Afrikaans origin and List of South African slang words

== A ==
Aardvark
from South African Dutch aardvark (earth + pig)
Aboard
from Dutch Aan boord
Afrikaans
from Dutch Afrikaans (Africanish)
Aloof
from Old French lof, based on Middle Dutch lof (windward direction), now oploeven + Middle English a
Apartheid
from Afrikaans apartheid, from Dutch apart + suffix -heid (separate + -hood)
Avast
from 17th century Dutch hou'vast (hold fast, hold steady)

== B ==
Bamboo
from 16th century Dutch bamboe, based on Malay bambu
Batik
from Dutch batik, based on Javanese amba + titik (to write + dot, point)
Bazooka
from US slang bazoo (mouth), based on Dutch bazuin (trompet)
Beaker
from either Old Norse bikarr or Middle Dutch beker (mug, cup)
Beleaguer
from 16th century Dutch belegeren (besiege)
Berm
from French berme, based on Old Dutch b(a)erm
Bicker
from Middle Dutch bicken (to slash, attack) + Middle English frequentative suffix -er
Blasé
via French blasé, past participle of blaser (="to satiate"), perhaps from Dutch blazen (="to blow"), with a sense of "puffed up under the effects of drinking"
Blaze (to make public, often in a bad sense, boastfully)
from Middle Dutch blasen (="to blow, on a trumpet)
Blink
perhaps from Middle Dutch blinken (="to glitter")
Blister
via Old French blestre, perhaps from a Scandinavian source or from Middle Dutch blyster (="swelling")
Block (solid piece)
via Old French bloc (="log, block"), from Middle Dutch blok (="trunk of a tree")
Bluff (poker term)
from Dutch bluffen (="to brag, boast") or verbluffen (="to baffle, mislead")
Bluff (landscape feature)
from Dutch blaf (="flat, broad"), apparently a North Sea nautical term for ships with flat vertical bows, later extended to landscape features
Blunderbuss
from Dutch donderbus, from donder (="thunder") + bus (="gun," originally "box, tube"), altered by resemblance to blunder
Boer (Dutch colonist in South Africa)
from Dutch boer (="farmer"), from Middle Dutch
Bogart
after Humphrey Bogart. Boomgaard means "orchard" ("tree-garden").
Bokkoms
from Dutch bokking (="buckling"), a type of salter fish
Boodle
from Dutch boedel (="property")
Boom
from boom (="tree"); cognate to English beam
Boomslang
from boomslang (="tree snake"), a type of snake
Booze
from Middle Dutch busen (="to drink in excess"); according to JW de Vries busen is equivalent to buizen
Boss
from baas
Boulevard
from "bolwerk", which came as boulevard into French, then into English. "Bolwerk" was also directly borrowed as 'bulwark'
Bow (front of a ship)
from Old Norse bogr, Low German boog or Dutch boeg
Brackish
from Middle Dutch or Low German brac (="salty", also "worthless"), now brak
Brandy (wine)
from brandewijn (literally "burnt wine")
Brooklyn
after the town of Breukelen near Utrecht
Bruin/Bruins
archaic English word for brown bear, derived from the Dutch word for brown bruin
Buckwheat
from Middle Dutch boecweite (="beech wheat") because of its resemblance to grains and seed of beech wheat
Bully
from boel (="lover", "brother")
Bulwark
from bolwerk
Bumpkin
from bommekijn ('little barrel')
Bundle
from Middle Dutch bondel or perhaps a merger of this word and Old English byndele ('binding')
Bung
from Middle Dutch bonge (="stopper")
Buoy
from boei (="shackle" or "buoy")
Bush (uncleared district of a British colony)
probably from Dutch bosch, now bos or bosje in the same sense, since it seems to appear first in former Dutch colonies

== C ==
Caboose
from kambuis or kombuis (="ship's kitchen", "galley")
Cam
from 18th century Dutch cam (cog of a wheel", originally comb, cognate of English comb), nowadays kam, or from English camber (having a slight arch)
Cockatoo
from kaketoe
Cashier
from Middle Dutch cassier
Coleslaw
from 18th century Dutch koolsla (cabbage salad)
Commodore
probably from Dutch kommandeur, from French commandeur, from Old French comandeor
Cookie
from koekje, or in informal Dutch koekie (="biscuit", "cookie")
Coney Island
(English dialect word for Rabbit) from Conyne Eylandt (literally "Rabbit Island"), in modern Dutch konijn and eiland.
Cramp
(metal bar bent at both ends) from Middle Dutch crampe or Middle Low German krampe.
Cricket
from Old French criquet 'goal post', 'stick', perhaps from Middle Dutch cricke 'stick, staff'
Crimp
from Old English gecrympan, perhaps reintroduced from Low German or Dutch krimpen (to shrink)
Croon
via Scottish, from Middle Dutch kronen (= to lament, mourn)
Cruise
from Dutch kruisen (="to cross, sail to and fro"), from kruis (="cross")
Cruller
from 19th century Dutch krullen (to curl)

== D ==
Dam
from Middle Dutch or Middle Low German dam, or from Old Norse dammr
Dapper
from Middle Dutch or Middle Low German dapper (bold, sturdy) in modern Dutch “brave”
Deck
from 16th century Middle Dutch dec or dekken (to cover)
Decoy
possibly from 16th century Dutch de (the) + kooi (cage, used of a pond surrounded by nets, into which wildfowl were lured for capture). Or from 16th century Dutch "eendekooi" (duck cage; a cage with an artificial duck to lure wild ducks); mistranslated as "een" dekooi; should have been read as "eend (duck)" -e- "kooi (cage)"-> a (article) dekooi -> (a) decoy
Dingus
from Dutch dinges, literally "thing".
Dock
from Middle Dutch or Middle Low German docke, nowadays dok
Dollar
from Dutch (Rijks)daalder
Domineer
from late 16th century Dutch dominieren (to rule), based on Middle French dominer
Dope
from American English dope, based on Dutch doop (sauce) or dopen (to dip or to baptise)
Dredge
from Scottish dreg-boat (boat for dredging), perhaps based on Middle Dutch dregghe (drag-net), nowadays dreggen
Drill (verb)
from 17th century Dutch drillen
Drug
from Old French drogue, based on Middle Dutch droge-vate (dry barrels, with first element mistaken as word for the contents)
Drum
probably from Middle Dutch tromme, now trom
Dune
from French dune, based on Middle Dutch dune, now duin

== E ==
Easel
from ezel (=originally (and still) "donkey"; "(schilders)ezel"=easel, lit. "painter's donkey")
Elope
from ontlopen (run away)
Etch
from Dutch ets or etsen
Excise (noun)
(="tax on goods") from Middle Dutch excijs, apparently altered from accijns (="tax"); English got the word, and the idea for the tax, from the Netherlands.

== F ==
Filibuster
from Spanish filibustero from French flibustier ultimately from Dutch vrijbuiter (="pirate" or "freebooter")
Flushing, Queens
from Vlissingen, a city in the Netherlands
Foist
from Dutch vuisten (="take in hand"), from Middle Dutch vuist (="fist")
Forlorn hope
from verloren hoop (literally "lost heap or group", figuratively "suicide mission," "cannon fodder") Forlorn also has identical cognates in German and the Scandinavian languages.
Fraught
from vrecht, vracht
Freebooter
from vrijbuiter
Freight
from vracht
Frolic
from vrolijk (="cheerful")
Furlough
from verlof (="permission (to leave)")

== G ==
Galoot
(="awkward or boorish man"), originally a sailor's contemptuous word (="raw recruit, green hand") for soldiers or marines, of uncertain origin; "Dictionary of American Slang" proposes galut, Sierra Leone creole form of Spanish galeoto (="galley slave"); perhaps rather Dutch slang kloot (="testicle"), klootzak (="scrotum"), used figuratively as an insult
Gas
from gas, a neologism from Jan Baptista van Helmont, derived from the Greek chaos
Geek
from geck (gek) (="fool")
Gherkin
from Dutch plural of gurk "cucumber", shortened form of East Frisian augurk
Gimp (cord or thread)
from Dutch gimp
Gin
from jenever
Gnu
from gnoe, earlier t’gnu, from a Khoikhoi word
Golf
from kolf (="bat, club," but also a game played with these)
Grab
from grijpen (="to seize, to grasp, to snatch")
Gruff
from Middle Dutch or Middle Low German grof (="coarse (in quality), thick, large")
Guilder
from gulden
Gulp
likely from Flemish gulpe or Dutch gulpen (="to gush, pour forth, guzzle, swallow"), probably of imitative origin.

== H ==
Hale (verb)
(="drag, summon"), from Old Frankonian haler (="to pull, haul"), from Frankonian *halon or Old Dutch halen, both from Proto Germanic
Hankering
from Middle Dutch hankeren or Dutch hunkeren
Harlem
called after the city of Haarlem near Amsterdam
Hartebeest
from both Afrikaans (Hartebees) and Dutch (Hartenbeest)
Heckle
from Middle Dutch hekelen
Hoboken
possibly named after the Flemish town Hoboken, from Middle Dutch Hooghe Buechen or Hoge Beuken (="High Beeches" or "Tall Beeches")
Howitzer
from Dutch houwitzer, which in turn comes from German Haussnitz and later Haubitze.
Hoist
from Middle Dutch hijsen (=raise)
Holster
from holster
Hooky
from hoekje (=corner) in the sense of "to go around the corner"
Hoyden
maybe from heiden (=backwoodsman), from Middle Dutch (=heathen)
Hump
perhaps from Dutch homp (="lump")
Hustle, Hustler
from Dutch hutselen, husseln "to shake, to toss"

== I ==
Iceberg
from Dutch ijsberg (literally 'ice mountain')
Ietsism
from Dutch ietsisme (literally: somethingism) an unspecified faith in an undetermined higher or supernatural power or force
Isinglass
from Dutch huizenblas (no longer used) from Middle Dutch huusblase, from huus sturgeon + blase bladder

== J ==
Jeer (to deride, to mock)
Perhaps from Dutch gieren "to cry or roar," or German scheren "to plague, vex," literally "to shear"
Jib (foresail of a ship)
from Dutch gijben (boom or spar of a sailing ship) and Dutch gijpen (turn the boat using foresail)

== K ==
Keelhauling
from kielhalen (literally "to haul keel"), kiel (= keel)
Keeshond
prob. from special use of Kees (nickname corresponding to proper name Cornelis) + hond "dog"
Kill (body of water)
from kil from Middle Dutch kille (literally "riverbed")
Kink
from kink referring to a twist in a rope or cable
Knapsack
from Middle Dutch knapzak (snack + bag)
Knickerbocker
The pen-name was borrowed from Washington Irving's friend Herman Knickerbocker, and literally means "toy marble-baker." Also, descendants of Dutch settlers to New York, USA, are referred to as Knickerbockers and later became used in reference to a style of pants

== L ==
Landscape
from 16th century Dutch landschap (land + -ship)
Leak
from Middle Dutch lekken (to leak, to drip) and lek (=leak)
Loiter
from Middle Dutch loteren
Luck
from Middle Dutch luc, shortening of gheluc (happiness, good fortune), now geluk

== M ==
Maelstrom
from 17th century Dutch mael + stroom (turning + current), possibly based on Old Norse mal(u)streymur
Manikin
from Middle Dutch manneken (little man)
Mannequin
from French Mannequin, based on Middle Dutch manneken (little man)
Mart
from Middle Dutch markt (market)
Measles
possibly from Middle Dutch mazelen (blemish)
Meerkat
from South African Dutch meer + kat (lake + cat), perhaps an alteration of Hindi markat (ape)
Morass
from Middle Dutch marasch (swamp), partly based on Old French marais (marsh), in modern Dutch: moeras
Mud
from Middle Dutch modde (="thick mud") now modder, and/or Middle Low German mudde

== O ==
Offal
possibly from Middle Dutch afval (leftovers, rubbish)
Onslaught
From Middle Dutch aanslag (attack')

== P ==
Patroon
from patroon (="patron")
Peg
from Middle Dutch pegge, now peg (="peg")
Pickle
c.1440, probably from Middle Dutch and still pekel
Pit
the stone of a drupaceous fruit : from pit
Plug
from plugge, originally a maritime term, still plug in Dutch.
Polder
from polder
Poppycock
from pappekak (=dialect for "soft dung")
Potassium
from potaschen c. 1477 see Potash
Prop
probably from Middle Dutch proppe (="vine prop, support; stop for a bottle"), now still prop
Pump
from pomp
Puss
perhaps from early 16th century Dutch poes (still in use as poes / poesje) or Low German puus (pet name for cat), but probably much older than the record, because present in many Indo-European languages.

== Q ==
Quack
shortened from quacksalver, from kwakzalver (literally "someone who daubs ointments")

== R ==
Rant
from Dutch randten (earlier ranten) "talk foolishly, rave"
Roster
from rooster (="schedule, or grating/grill")
Rover
from rover (="robber")

== S ==
Santa Claus
from Middle Dutch Sinterklaas (="Saint Nicholas"), bishop of Minor Asia who became a patron saint for children. (Dutch and Belgian feast celebrated on the 5th and 6 December respectively) (Origins of Santa Claus in US culture)
School (group of fish)
from Dutch school (group of fish)
Scone
via Scottish, shortened from Middle Dutch schoonbrood "fine bread", from schoon (bright) + brood (bread)
Scow
from schouw (a type of boat)
Scum (as in lowest class of humanity)
from schuim (froth, foam)
Shoal
from Middle Dutch schole (="large number (of fish)") (modern Dutch: school) (etymology not sure)
Skate
from schaats. The noun was originally adopted as in Dutch, with 'skates' being the singular form of the noun; due to the similarity to regular English plurals this form was ultimately used as the plural while 'skate' was derived for use as singular."
Sketch
from schets
Scour
from Middle Dutch scuren (now "schuren"), cognate of the English word "shower"
Skipper
from Middle Dutch scipper (now schipper, literally "shipper")
Sled, sleigh
from Middle Dutch slede, slee
Slim
"thin, slight, slender," from Dutch slim "bad, sly, clever, smart" from Middle Dutch slim "bad, crooked, smart, intelligent"
Slobber
from Middle Dutch slabberen.
Sloop
from sloep
Slurp
from slurpen
Smack (boat)
possibly from smak "sailboat," perhaps so-called from the sound made by its sails
Smearcase
from smeerkaas (="cheese that can be spread over bread, cottage-cheese") or smeerkees (="someone who is very dirty")
Smelt
from smelten (="to melt")
Smuggler
from Low German smukkelen and Dutch smokkelen (="to transport (goods) illegally"), apparently a frequentative formation of a word meaning "to sneak"
Snack
perhaps from Middle Dutch snakken (="to long" (snakken naar lucht="to gasp for air") originally "to eat"/"chatter")
Snap
from Middle Dutch or Low German snappen (to bite, seize)
Snicker
from Dutch snikken (="to gasp, sob")
Snoop
from 19 century Dutch snoepen (to eat (possibly in secret) something sweet)
Snoot, Snooty
from Middle Dutch snute, now snuit (=face)
Snout
from Middle Dutch snute
Snuff
from snuiftabak (literally "sniff tobacco")
Spa
The term is derived from the name of the town of Spa, Belgium, whose name is known from Roman times, when the location was called Aquae Spadanae, sometimes incorrectly connected to the Latin word spargere meaning to scatter, sprinkle or moisten.
Spangle
probably from Middle Dutch spange (=brooch, clasp)
Splice
from Middle Dutch splissen (="to splice") now splijten
Splinter
from splinter
Split
from Middle Dutch splitten
Spook
from spook (="ghost(ly image)")
Spoor
from both Afrikaans and Dutch spoor (="track"/"trail")
Spray
from Middle Dutch sprayen
Sprinkle
from Middle Dutch/Middle Low German sprenkel (="spot, speck")
Spout
related to Middle Dutch spoiten (="to spout"):
Starboard
from Dutch stuurboord
Still life
from Dutch stilleven
Stoker
from stoken (="stoke a fire")
Stoop (steps)
from stoep (=road up a dike, usually right-angled)
Stockfish
from Dutch stokvis (= "stick fish")
Stock
from Dutch stok (= "stick"). The Dutch word stok, pronounced similarly, was a wooden stick with carvings taken out of it and then split in half, one half was kept at the stock exchange and the other half was proof that the owner owned a certain amount of stock in something.
Stove
from Middle Dutch stove (="heated room"). The Dutch word stoof, pronounced similarly, is a small (often wooden) box with holes in it. One would place glowing coals inside so it would emanate heat, and then put one's feet on top of it while sitting (in a chair) to keep one's feet warm.
Stripe
from Middle Dutch or Middle Low German stripe (="stripe, streak"), now strip
Sutler
from zoetelaar (="one who sweetens", sweetener, old-fashioned for "camp cook")
Swab
From Dutch zwabber

== T ==
Tackle
from Middle Dutch or Middle Low German takel (="the rigging of a ship,") perhaps related to Middle Dutch taken (="grasp, seize")
Tattle
probably from Middle Flemish tatelen (="to stutter,") parallel to Middle Dutch, Middle Low German, East Frisian tateren (="to chatter, babble,") possibly of imitative origin.
Tattoo (military term)
from taptoe (literally "close the tap"). So called because police used to visit taverns in the evening to shut off the taps of casks.
Trek
from Dutch trekken ("to march, journey") via Afrikaans
Trigger
from trekker (Trekken ="to pull")
Tub
from Middle Low German, Middle Dutch, or Middle Flemish tubbe, of uncertain origin. Now tobbe and wastobbe (=washing tub)

== U ==
Upsy-daisy (baby talk extension of up)
from late 17th century Dutch op zijn, and also occasionally as an adverb, "extremely"

== V ==
Vang
from Dutch vangen (=to catch)
Veld
from Cape Dutch veldt, now veld, used in South African English and in Dutch to describe a field

== W ==
Waffle (noun)
from Dutch wafel, from Middle Dutch or Middle Low German wafel
Walrus
from walrus
Wagon
from Dutch wagen, Middle Dutch waghen (= "cart, carriage, wagon")
Wentletrap
from Dutch wenteltrap: wentelen (= "winding, spiraling") and trap (= "stairway")
Wiggle
from wiggelen (= "to wobble, to wiggle") or wiegen (= "to rock")
Wildebeest
from Dutch "wilde" (= "wild") and "beest" (= "beast")
Witloof
from Belgian Dutch witloof (literally wit "white" + loof "foliage"), Dutch witlof

== Y ==
Yacht
from Dutch jacht, short for jachtschip (literally "hunting ship")
Yankee
from Jan Kees, a personal name, originally used mockingly to describe pro-French revolutionary citizens, with allusion to the small keeshond dog, then for "colonials" in New Amsterdam. This is not the only possible etymology for the word yankee, however; the Oxford English Dictionary has quotes with the term from as early as 1765, quite some time before the French Revolution. Nowadays it commonly refers to Americans from the United States.

== See also ==
- Lists of English words of international origin
- List of English words of Afrikaans origin
- List of place names of Dutch origin
- List of South African slang words
- List of English Latinates of Germanic origin
