= Deck =

Deck may refer to:

== A level or platform ==
=== Buildings and structures ===
- Deck (bridge), the roadway surface of a bridge
- Deck (building), an outdoor floor attached to a building made of wood or wood-like material
- Another name for a storey
- The concrete or tile area surrounding a swimming pool
- Deck arch bridge, a type of bridge
- Observation deck, a platform situated upon a tall architectural structure or natural feature
- Orthotropic deck
- Roof deck, the framing and sheathing to which roofing material is applied

=== Transportation ===
- Bus deck, referring to the number of passenger levels on a bus
- Cockpit, also called a "flight deck"

==== Maritime ====
- Deck (ship), a floor of a ship
- Flight deck of an aircraft carrier

== Audiovisual equipment ==
- Cassette deck, a type of tape machine for playing and recording compact cassettes
- Head unit
- Phonograph turntable
- Tape deck, a sound recording and playback device

== People ==
- Deck (surname)
- Deck McGuire (born 1989), American baseball player

== Other uses ==
- Deck (cards), a collection of cards
- Deck (news), a phrase, sentence or several sentences near the title of an article
- Stage (theatre)
- Steam Deck, a portable gaming computer
- The flat surface of a skateboard
- Deck Afta, a character from the anime Space Runaway Ideon
- Deck transformation, in topology

== See also ==
- Double decker (disambiguation)
- Deque - Double-ended queue
- Flatbed (disambiguation)
- Flight Deck (disambiguation)
