= Moradabad Junction railway station =

Railway station in Uttar Pradesh, India

Moradabad Junction
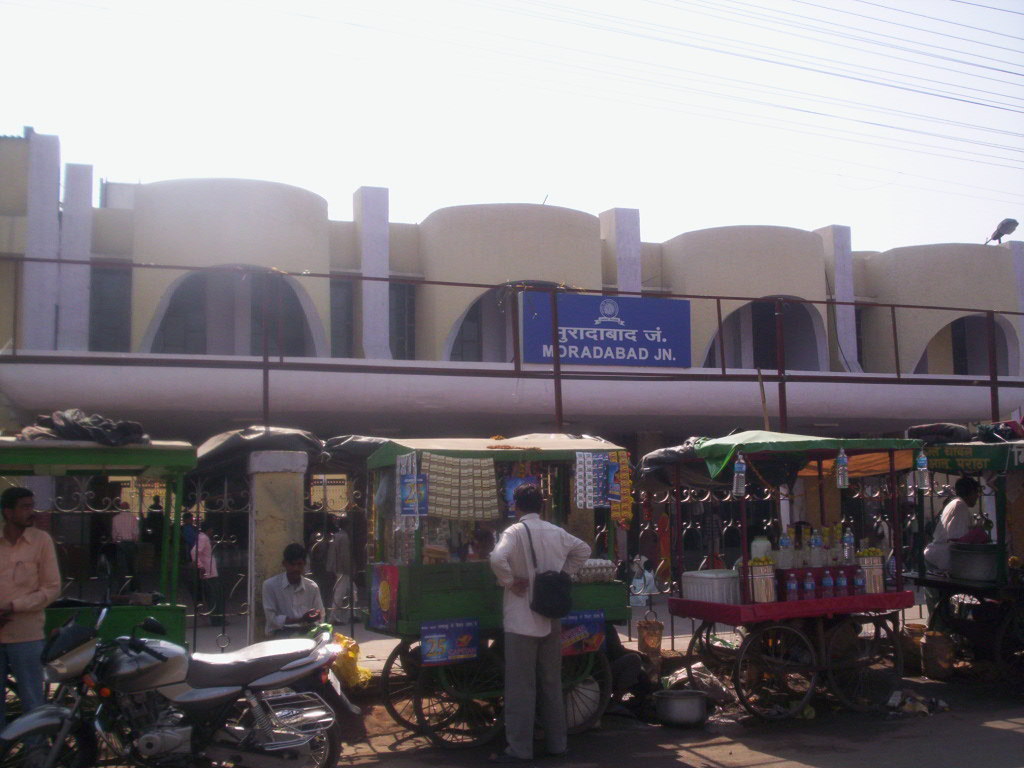
- Moradabad railway station

General information
- Location: NH 24, Moradabad, Uttar Pradesh; India
- Coordinates: 28°49′52″N 78°45′58″E
- Elevation: 271.230 metres (889.86 ft)
- System: Regional rail and Light rail station
- Owner: Indian Railways
- Operator: Northern Railway zone
- Lines: Lucknow–Moradabad line, Moradabad–Ambala line, Delhi–Moradabad line, Moradabad–Aligarh line, Ramnagar–Moradabad line
- Platforms: 7
- Tracks: 11

Construction
- Structure type: At grade
- Parking: Yes
- Cycle facilities: yes

Other information
- Status: Functioning
- Station code: MB
- Zone(s): Northern Railway
- Division(s): Moradabad

History
- Opened: 1873; 153 years ago
- Electrified: 2012; 14 years ago
Location
- Location within India Location within Uttar Pradesh
- Interactive map

Moradabad railway station is located in Moradabad district in the Indian state of Uttar Pradesh and serves Moradabad, which is known for its brassware industries. Moradabad is a major railway station of Western Uttar Pradesh and is located just 157 kilometres (98 mi) from national capital New Delhi. Moradabad also has the divisional headquarters of the Northern Railway. Rajdhani, Shatabdi, Garib Rath Express, Double Decker, Antyodaya Express, Humsafar express and many Superfast Express trains pass through and stop at Moradabad Junction.

== History ==
After connecting Varanasi with Delhi, the Oudh and Rohilkhand Railway started working west of Lucknow and it reached Bareilly in 1873. A line connecting Moradabad to Chandausi was also built in 1872 and it was continued up to Bareilly in 1873. The Bareilly–Moradabad chord was completed in 1894. The former main line became Chandausi Loop and the one via Rampur became main line. It was extended to Saharanpur in 1887. A branch line to Aligarh via Chandausi was opened in 1894. Moradabad was linked to Ghaziabad in 1900.

== Electrification ==
Electrification of the 646 km (401 mi)-long Mughasarai–Moradabad line was completed in 2013. Many trains on the Ambala and Lucknow line run with electric locomotives (including Freight trains). Electrification of the Delhi–Moradabad line was completed in 2015. Being one of the important sections of the Northern Railways, Indian railway gave this project a high priority.

== Passenger movement ==
Moradabad is amongst the top hundred booking stations of Indian Railway. Moradabad is one of the highest-booking stations in Uttar Pradesh.

== Amenities ==
Moradabad railway station is a category 'A' railway station. It has a Tourist Information Centre, Post Office, telegraph office, General Railway Police office, computerised reservation counters, retiring room, vegetarian and non vegetarian refreshment rooms, tea stall and book stall. It also has the Tatkal seat booking counter.

== Importance ==
Moradabad is called an interchange station due to its five-line junction. Many passengers change trains at Moradabad because there are plenty of trains to different destinations. After electrification the Delhi–Moradabad line railway has planned to make this route an alternative to the Delhi–Kanpur–Mugalsarai grand chord route. Moradabad is a preferred option to get trains for the tourists who want to go to Ramnagar, Jim Corbett National Park, Nainital, Almora and other parts of Kumaon region of Uttarakhand because it is the nearest station which is connected by train to the Kumoun region.

== Connectivity ==
Moradabad is the busiest railway station of Western Uttar Pradesh with more than 200 stopping trains. Many local passenger trains are available to nearby cities. There are many trains to major cities like. Jaisalmer, Bikaner, Bhuj, Porbandar, Svdk katra, Howrah, Ghazipur City, New Delhi, Guwahati, Ahmedabad, Chandigarh, Lucknow, Varanasi, Dehradun, Patna, Jaipur, Jodhpur, Dibrugarh, Amritsar, Kolkata, Dhanbad, Ludhiana, Jammu Tawi, Tatanagar, Kanpur, Aligarh, Surat, Mumbai, Gwalior and Agra, Ranchi etc. Daily about 10 trains run from Moradabad to Ramnagar and more than 60 trains run to Lucknow. More than 50 trains run to New Delhi. Even though Moradabad has more than 200 stopping trains it does not have any direct train to cities like Chennai, Bangalore, Bhopal, Hyderabad and other important cities of Central, Western and Southern parts of the Country.

== Gallery ==
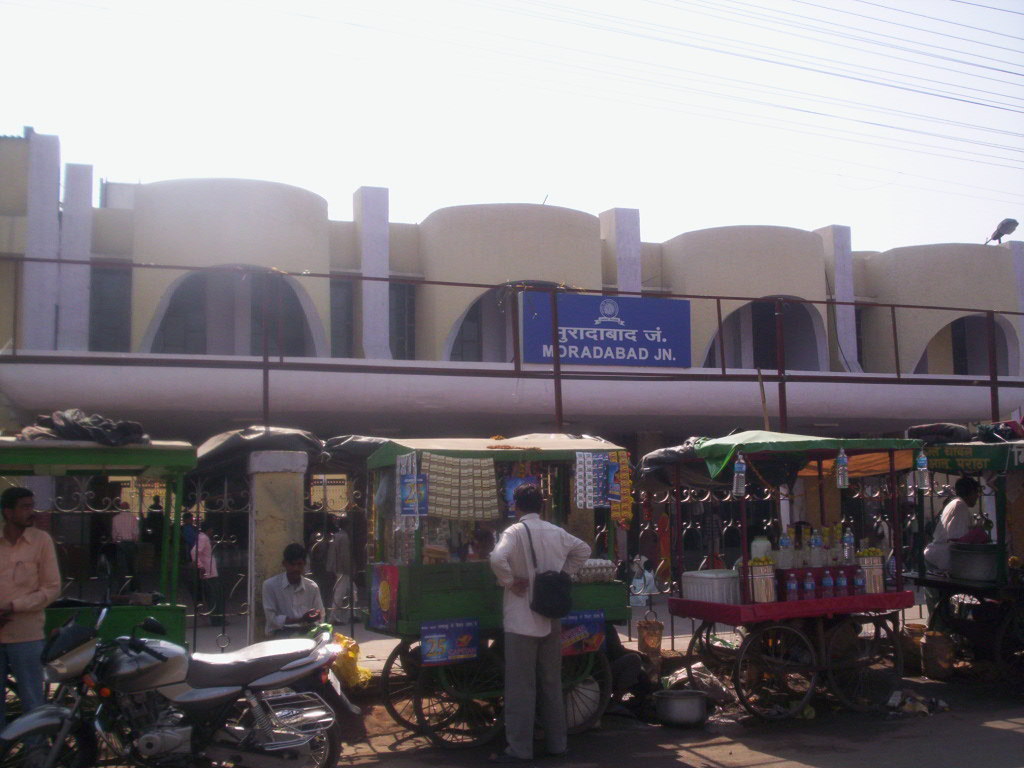
Moradabad railway station entrance

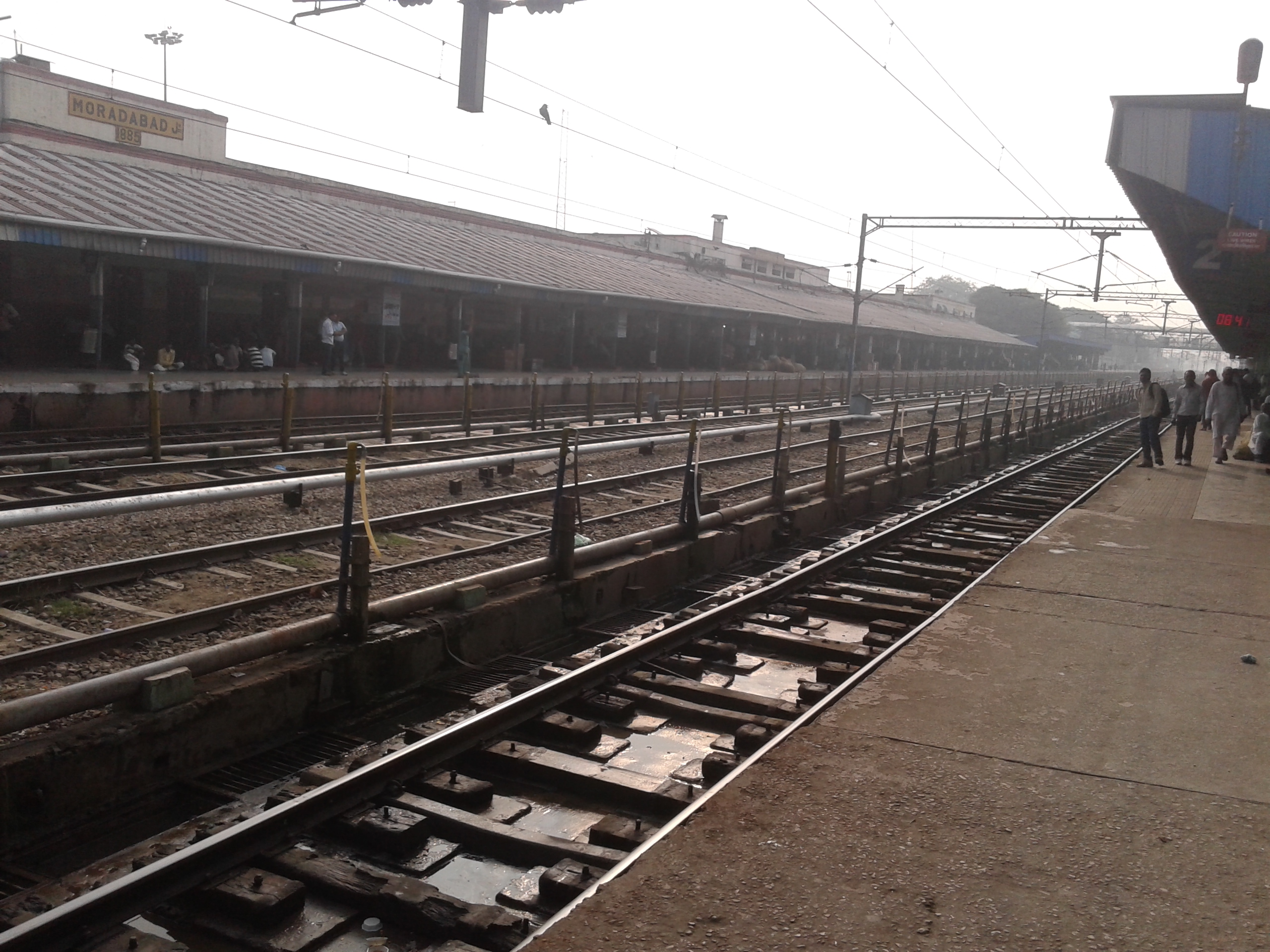
A chilly sunny morning at Moradabad railway station

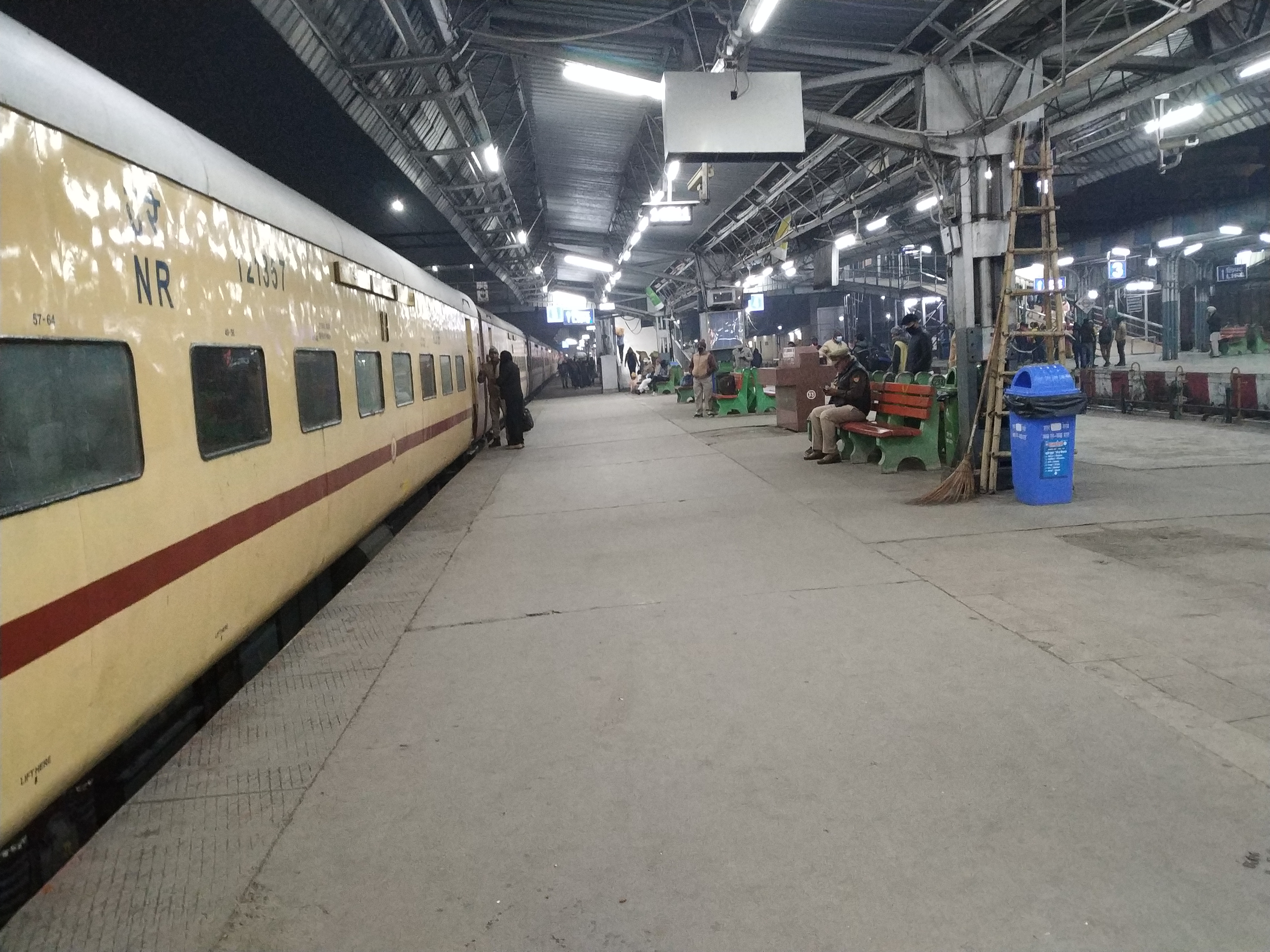
14511 Nauchandi Express standing on platform 5 in Moradabad Jn

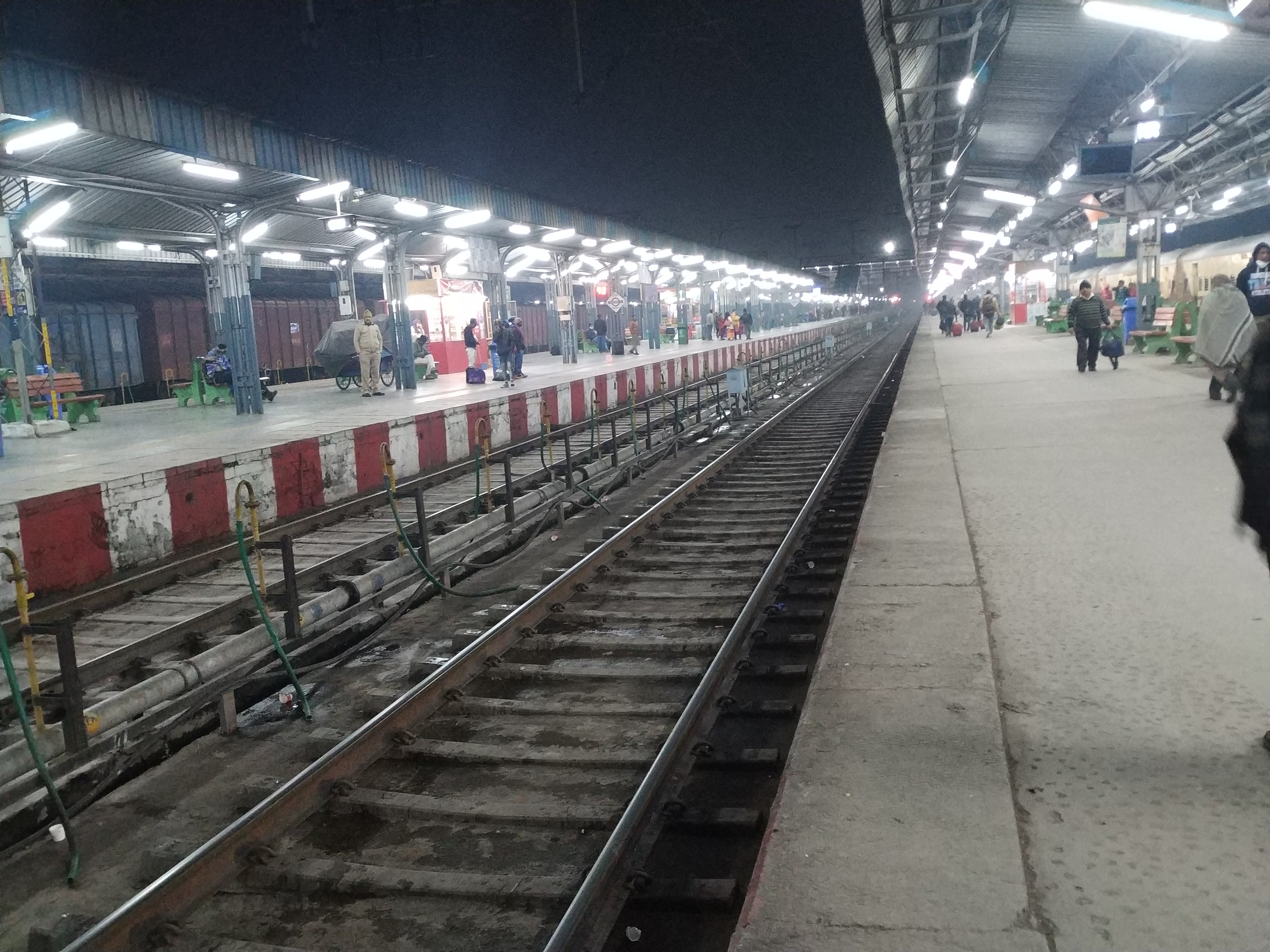
Moradabad junction platform 4

Preceding station	Indian Railways	Following station
Katghar towards ?	Northern Railway zone Lucknow–Shahranpur main line	Harthala towards ?
Terminus	Northern Railway zone Chandausi loop	Macharya towards ?
Terminus	Northern Railway zone Moradabad–Ghaziabad link	Lodipur Bishanpur towards ?
