= Saint-Privat =

Saint-Privat may refer to:

- Privatus (bishop), first bishop of Mende
- the Mende Cathedral, officially Basilique-cathédrale Notre-Dame-et-Saint-Privat de Mende

Places

The following localities, all in France, are named after bishop Privatus of Mende:

- Saint-Privat-de-Champclos in the Gard département
- Saint-Privat-des-Vieux also in the Gard département
- Saint-Privat-d'Allier in the Haute-Loire département
- Saint-Privat-du-Dragon also in the Haute-Loire département
- Saint-Privat-du-Fau in the Lozère département
- Saint-Privat-de-Vallongue also in the Lozère département
- Saint-Privat, Ardèche
- Saint-Privat, Corrèze
- Saint-Privat, Hérault
- Saint-Privat-des-Prés in the Dordogne département
- Aulhat-Saint-Privat in the Puy-de-Dôme département
- Saint-Privat-la-Montagne in the Moselle département
- Saint-Privat, Moselle, former commune in the Moselle département

== See also ==
- Saint Privat (band)
- Battle of Gravelotte, also known as Battle of Saint-Privat after Saint-Privat-la-Montagne, Moselle
