= Flatten =

Flatten may refer to:

- Amy Flatten, American expert on international scientific collaboration and abstract oil painter
- Flat-ten engine, an engine with two banks of five opposing cylinders each
- Svein Flåtten, Norwegian politician
- Mount Flatten, mountain in the animated television series The Rocky and Bullwinkle Show
- Flattening, the compression of a circle or sphere into an ellipse or an ellipsoid
- Flattening of affect, loss or lack of emotional expressiveness
- Flattening the curve, a technique to slow spread of a pathogen in order to minimize peak demand on healthcare resources
- Regrading, changing the slope or grade of land; levelling
- Flat-file database, a database file format where there are no structures for indexing or recognizing relationships between records; flattened

== See also ==
- Flat (disambiguation)
