= Pardines =

Pardines can refer to:

- Pardines, Puy-de-Dôme, a commune in the Puy-de-Dôme department in Auvergne in central France.
- Pardines, Girona, a municipality in the province of Girona, Catalonia, Spain.
