= Katghar railway station =

Railway station in India

General information
- Location: Katghar Moradabad, Uttar Pradesh; India
- Coordinates: 28.8257°N 78.7965°E
- System: Indian Railways

Other information
- Station code: KGF
Location

Katghar Railway Station is located in Moradabad city of Uttar Pradesh. It lies on Lucknow–Moradabad line. It is about 4 km from Moradabad railway station which is the major railway station nearby to it.

== See also ==
- Moradabad railway station
