= Flight Deck (disambiguation) =

A flight deck is the platform of an aircraft carrier used for takeoffs and landings.

Flight deck may also refer to:

- The cockpit of a typically larger aircraft such as an airliner, transport aircraft, bomber aircraft etc.

== Roller coasters ==
- Flight Deck (Canada's Wonderland), in Vaughan, Ontario
- Flight Deck (California's Great America), United States
- Flight Deck (Kings Island), former name for The Bat roller coaster, Mason, Ohio, United States

== See also ==
- Deck (disambiguation) § Transportation
