= Aulhat-Flat =

- Commune
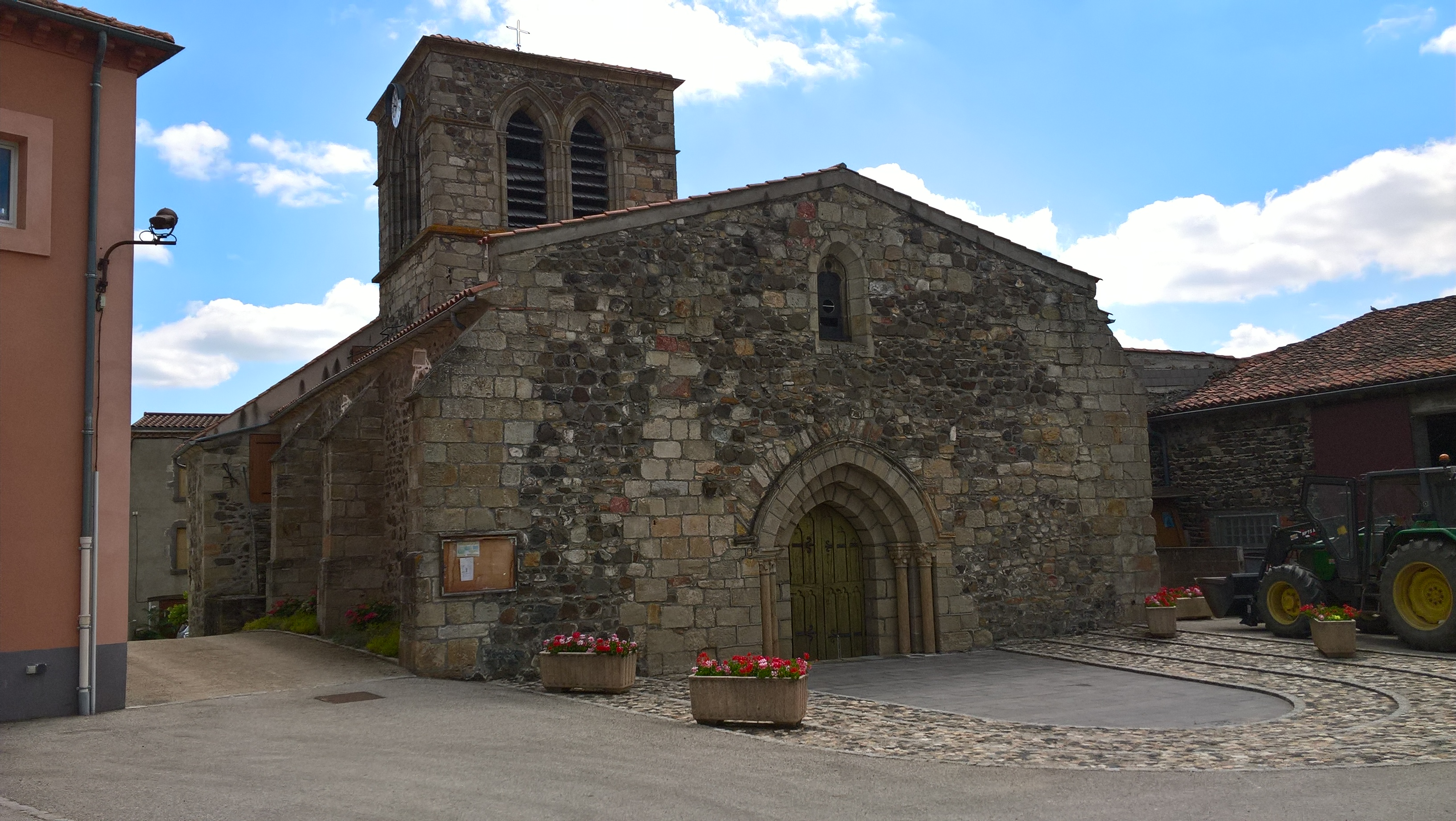
- The church in Flat
- Location of Aulhat-Flat
- Location within France Location within Auvergne-Rhône-Alpes
- Coordinates: 45°34′16″N 3°18′11″E
- Country: France
- Region: Auvergne-Rhône-Alpes
- Department: Puy-de-Dôme
- Arrondissement: Issoire
- Canton: Issoire
- Intercommunality: Agglo Pays d'Issoire

Government
  - Mayor (2026–32): Gérard Thevier
- Area^{1}: 12.78 km^{2} (4.93 sq mi)
- Population (2023): 944
  - Density: 73.9/km^{2} (191/sq mi)
- Time zone: UTC+01:00 (CET)
  - Summer (DST): UTC+02:00 (CEST)
- INSEE/Postal code: 63160 /63500
- ^{1} French Land Register data, which excludes lakes, ponds, glaciers > 1 km^{2} (0.386 sq mi or 247 acres) and river estuaries.

Aulhat-Flat (French pronunciation: [oja fla]) is a commune in the Puy-de-Dôme department of central France. The municipality was established on 1 January 2016 and consists of the former communes of Aulhat-Saint-Privat and Flat.

== See also ==
- Communes of the Puy-de-Dôme department
