= Flatbed =

Flatbed may refer to:

- Flatbed digital printer, the reproduction of digital images on physical surfaces
- Flatbed editor, a type of machine used for the editing of a motion picture film
- Flatbed scanner, an image scanner used for scanning paper or transparency originals into digital form
- Flatbed seat, airline seat that reclines to a full-horizontal flat position to form a bed
- Flatbed trolley, a rolling platform
- Flatbed semi-trailers
- Flatbed truck, a type of truck which has an entirely flat, level body with absolutely no sides or roof
- Flatcar
- Flat wagon
- Lockheed Flatbed, a proposed cargo aircraft design

== See also ==
- Conflat
- Flat (disambiguation)
