= Aulhat-Saint-Privat =

- Part of Aulhat-Flat
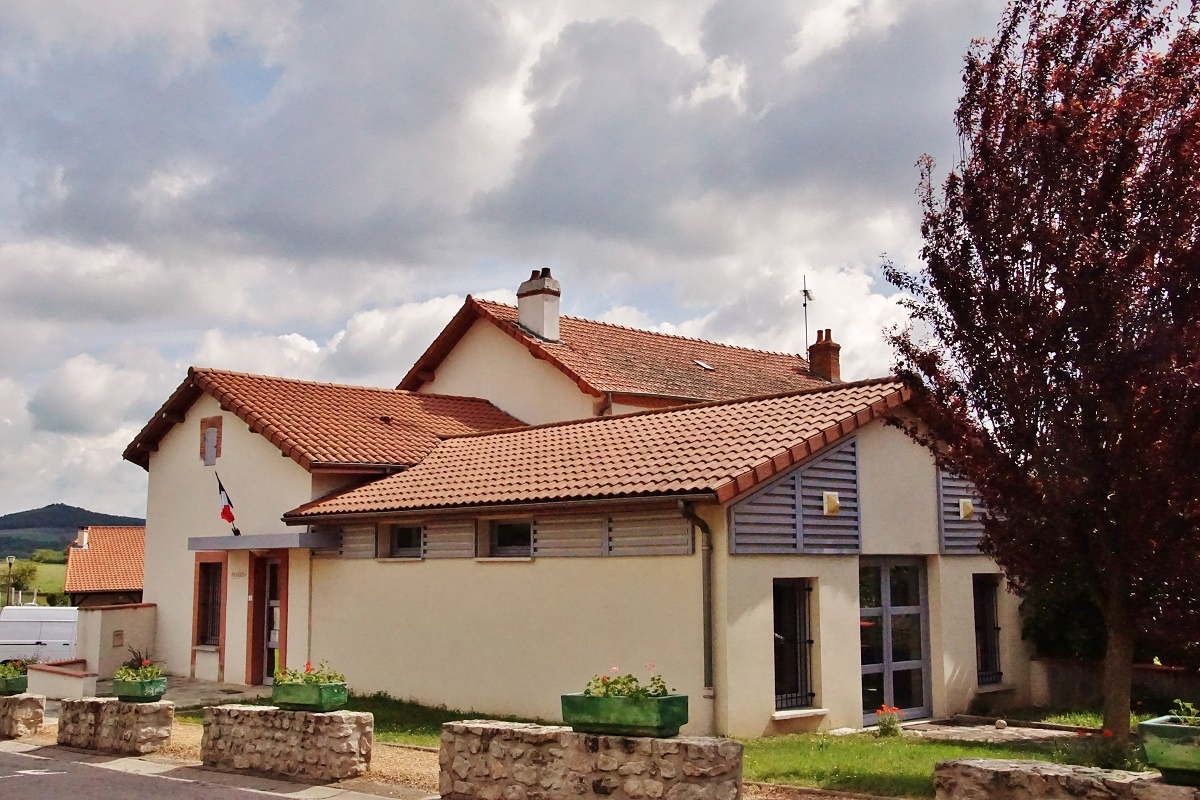
- Town hall
- Location of Aulhat-Saint-Privat
- Location within France Location within Auvergne-Rhône-Alpes
- Coordinates: 45°34′26″N 3°18′47″E
- Country: France
- Region: Auvergne-Rhône-Alpes
- Department: Puy-de-Dôme
- Arrondissement: Issoire
- Canton: Issoire
- Commune: Aulhat-Flat
- Area^{1}: 8.56 km^{2} (3.31 sq mi)
- Elevation: 430 m (1,410 ft)
- Highest elevation: 661 m (2,169 ft)
- Lowest elevation: 385 m (1,263 ft)
- Population (2023): 481
  - Density: 56.2/km^{2} (146/sq mi)
- Time zone: UTC+01:00 (CET)
  - Summer (DST): UTC+02:00 (CEST)
- Postal code: 63500
- ^{1} French Land Register data, which excludes lakes, ponds, glaciers > 1 km^{2} (0.386 sq mi or 247 acres) and river estuaries.

Aulhat-Saint-Privat (French pronunciation: [oja sɛ̃ pʁiva]) is a former commune in the Puy-de-Dôme department in Auvergne in central France. On 1 January 2016, it was merged into the new commune of Aulhat-Flat.

== See also ==
- Communes of the Puy-de-Dôme department
