= Le Broc, Puy-de-Dôme =

Le Broc
- Commune
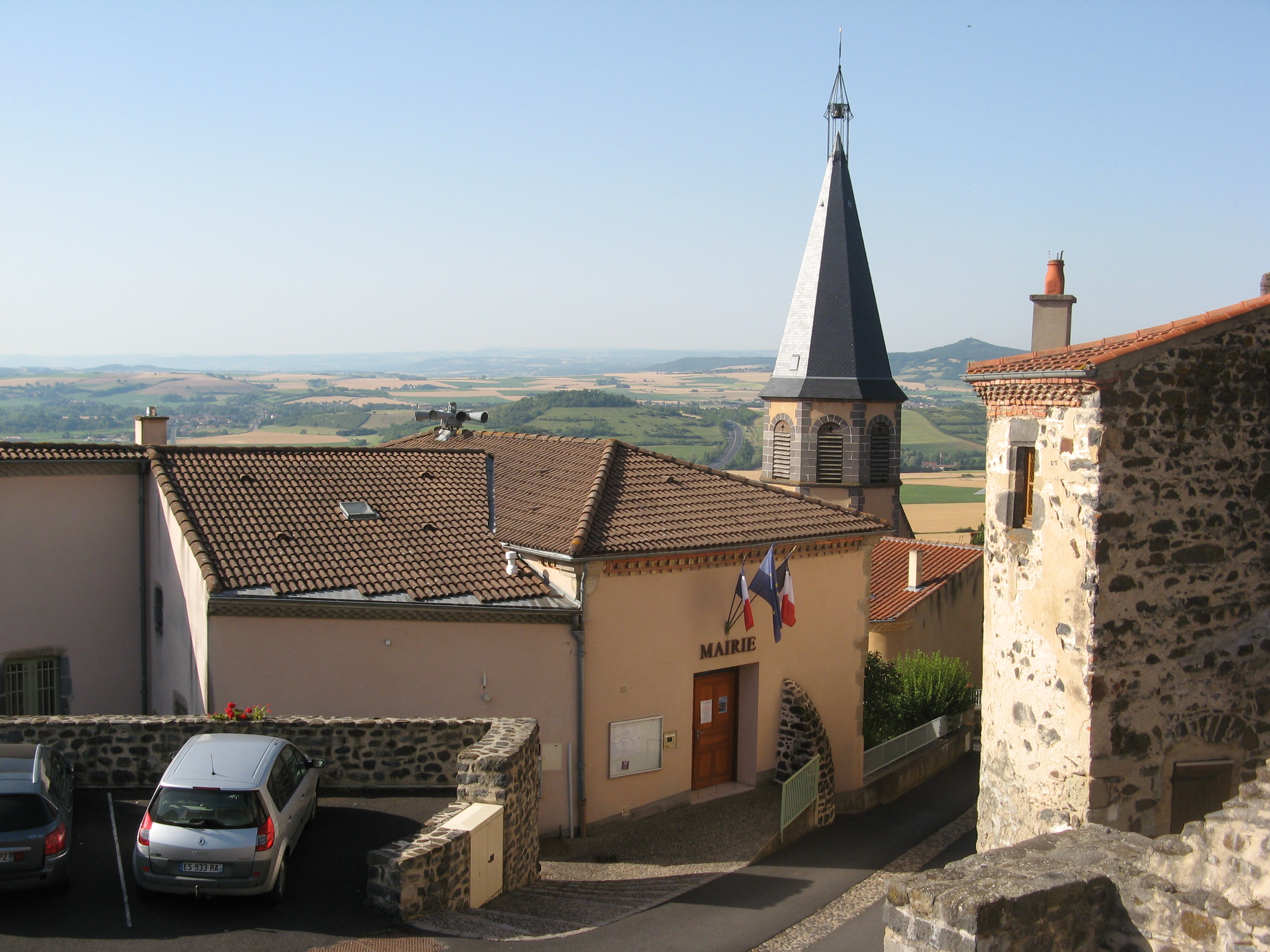
- The town hall in Le Broc

- Coat of arms
- Location of Le Broc
- Location within France Location within Auvergne-Rhône-Alpes
- Coordinates: 45°30′06″N 3°14′41″E
- Country: France
- Region: Auvergne-Rhône-Alpes
- Department: Puy-de-Dôme
- Arrondissement: Issoire
- Canton: Issoire
- Intercommunality: Agglo Pays d'Issoire

Government
  - Mayor (2026–32): Olivier Tezenas
- Area^{1}: 17.45 km^{2} (6.74 sq mi)
- Elevation: 470 m (1,540 ft)
- Highest elevation: 567 m (1,860 ft)
- Lowest elevation: 376 m (1,234 ft)
- Population (2023): 623
  - Density: 35.7/km^{2} (92.5/sq mi)
- Time zone: UTC+01:00 (CET)
  - Summer (DST): UTC+02:00 (CEST)
- INSEE/Postal code: 63054 /63500
- ^{1} French Land Register data, which excludes lakes, ponds, glaciers > 1 km^{2} (0.386 sq mi or 247 acres) and river estuaries.

Le Broc (French pronunciation: [lə bʁɔk]) is a commune in the Puy-de-Dôme department in Auvergne-Rhône-Alpes in central France.

== Population ==
Historical population
Year	Pop.	±% p.a.
1968	572	—
1975	536	−0.92%
1982	562	+0.68%
1990	588	+0.57%
1999	591	+0.06%
2007	610	+0.40%
2012	640	+0.96%
2017	679	+1.19%
2023	623	−1.42%
Source: INSEE

== See also ==
- Communes of the Puy-de-Dôme department
