= The Flat =

The Flat or The Flats may refer to any of the following:

== Geography ==
- The Flat (Houtman Abrolhos), a reef in Australia's Houtman Abrolhos island group
- "The Flat", a nickname for South Dunedin, New Zealand
- The Flat, Gloucestershire, UK
- The Flats, Cleveland, Ohio, USA
- The Flats, Holyoke, Massachusetts
- The Flats (Woodbridge), Connecticut, USA
- The Flats, Dorset, UK

== Entertainment ==
- The Flat (1921 film), a British silent film
- The Flat (1968 film) (Byt), a Czech film
- The Flat (2011 film), an Israeli film
- The Flats (film), 2002 drama film
- The Flats (documentary), 2024 documentary film

== See also ==
- Flat (disambiguation)
