= Saint-Yvoine =

- Commune
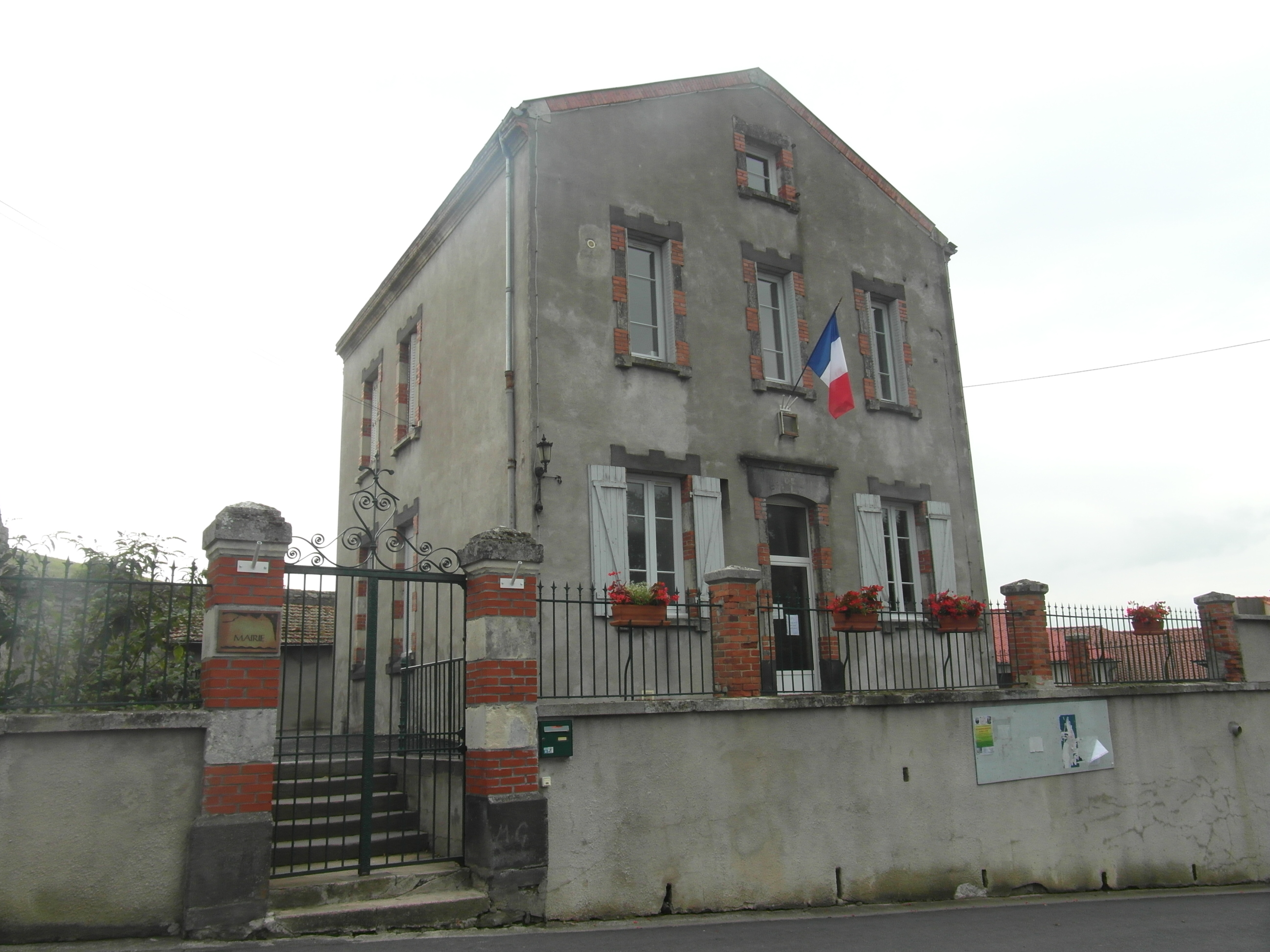
- The town hall in Saint-Yvoine

- Coat of arms
- Location of Saint-Yvoine
- Location within France Location within Auvergne-Rhône-Alpes
- Coordinates: 45°35′N 3°14′E
- Country: France
- Region: Auvergne-Rhône-Alpes
- Department: Puy-de-Dôme
- Arrondissement: Issoire
- Canton: Issoire
- Intercommunality: Agglo Pays d'Issoire

Government
  - Mayor (2026–32): Nathalie Dutheil
- Area^{1}: 8.89 km^{2} (3.43 sq mi)
- Elevation: 366 m (1,201 ft)
- Highest elevation: 607 m (1,991 ft)
- Lowest elevation: 354 m (1,161 ft)
- Population (2023): 553
  - Density: 62.2/km^{2} (161/sq mi)
- Time zone: UTC+01:00 (CET)
  - Summer (DST): UTC+02:00 (CEST)
- INSEE/Postal code: 63404 /63500
- ^{1} French Land Register data, which excludes lakes, ponds, glaciers > 1 km^{2} (0.386 sq mi or 247 acres) and river estuaries.

Saint-Yvoine (French pronunciation: [sɛ̃.t‿ivwan]) is a commune in the Puy-de-Dôme department in Auvergne in central France.

== See also ==
- Communes of the Puy-de-Dôme department
