= Orbeil =

- Commune
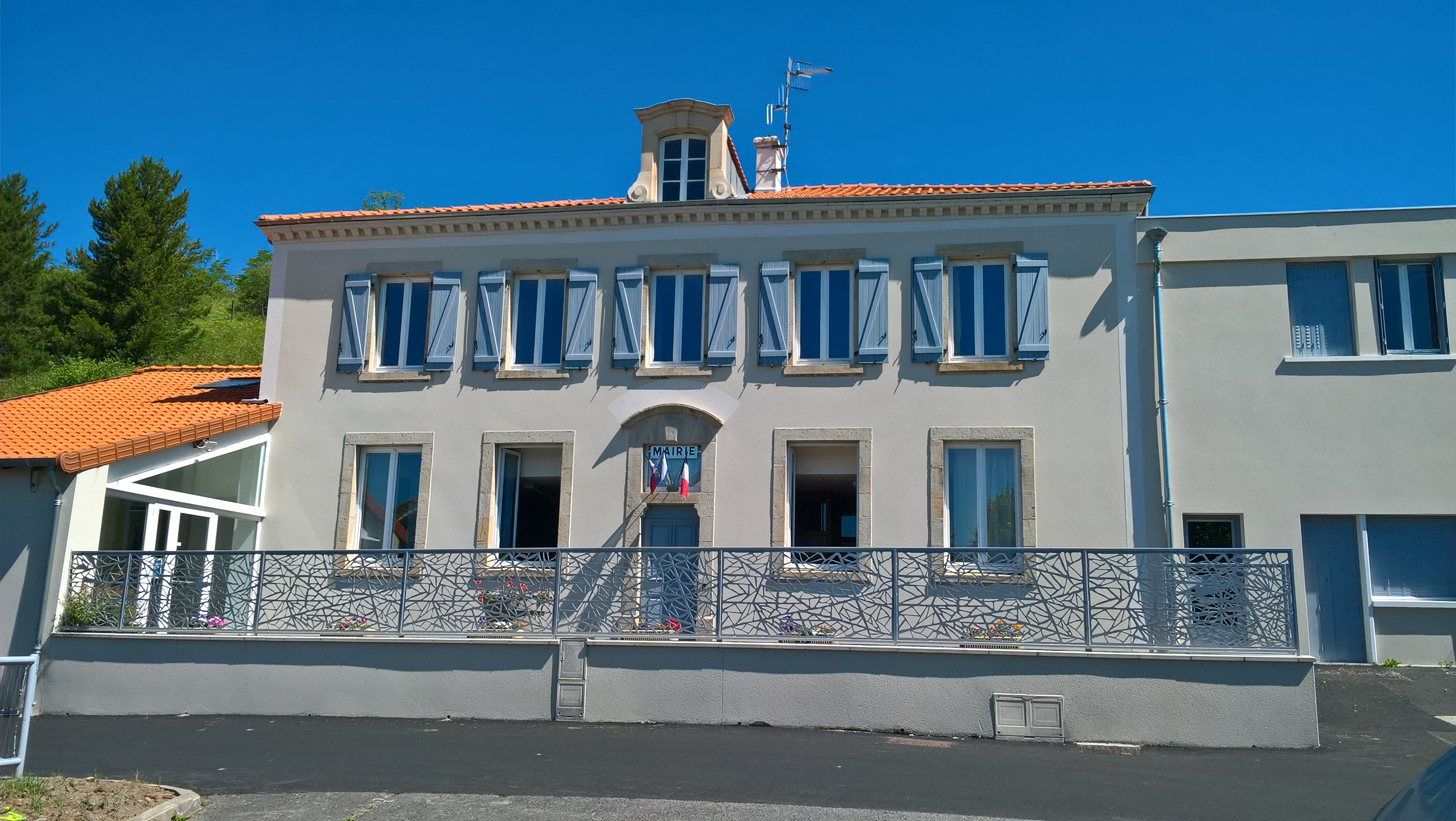
- The town hall in Orbeil
- Location of Orbeil
- Location within France Location within Auvergne-Rhône-Alpes
- Coordinates: 45°33′47″N 3°16′41″E
- Country: France
- Region: Auvergne-Rhône-Alpes
- Department: Puy-de-Dôme
- Arrondissement: Issoire
- Canton: Issoire
- Intercommunality: Agglo Pays d'Issoire

Government
  - Mayor (2020–2026): Bernard Merlen
- Area^{1}: 9.65 km^{2} (3.73 sq mi)
- Elevation: 360 m (1,180 ft)
- Highest elevation: 630 m (2,070 ft)
- Lowest elevation: 359 m (1,178 ft)
- Population (2023): 883
  - Density: 91.5/km^{2} (237/sq mi)
- Time zone: UTC+01:00 (CET)
  - Summer (DST): UTC+02:00 (CEST)
- INSEE/Postal code: 63261 /63500
- ^{1} French Land Register data, which excludes lakes, ponds, glaciers > 1 km^{2} (0.386 sq mi or 247 acres) and river estuaries.

Orbeil (French pronunciation: [ɔʁbɛj]) is a commune in the Puy-de-Dôme department in Auvergne in central France.

== See also ==
- Communes of the Puy-de-Dôme department
