= New Delhi–Moradabad main line =

Railway line in India

New Delhi–Moradabad line including Gajraula–Najibabad branch line
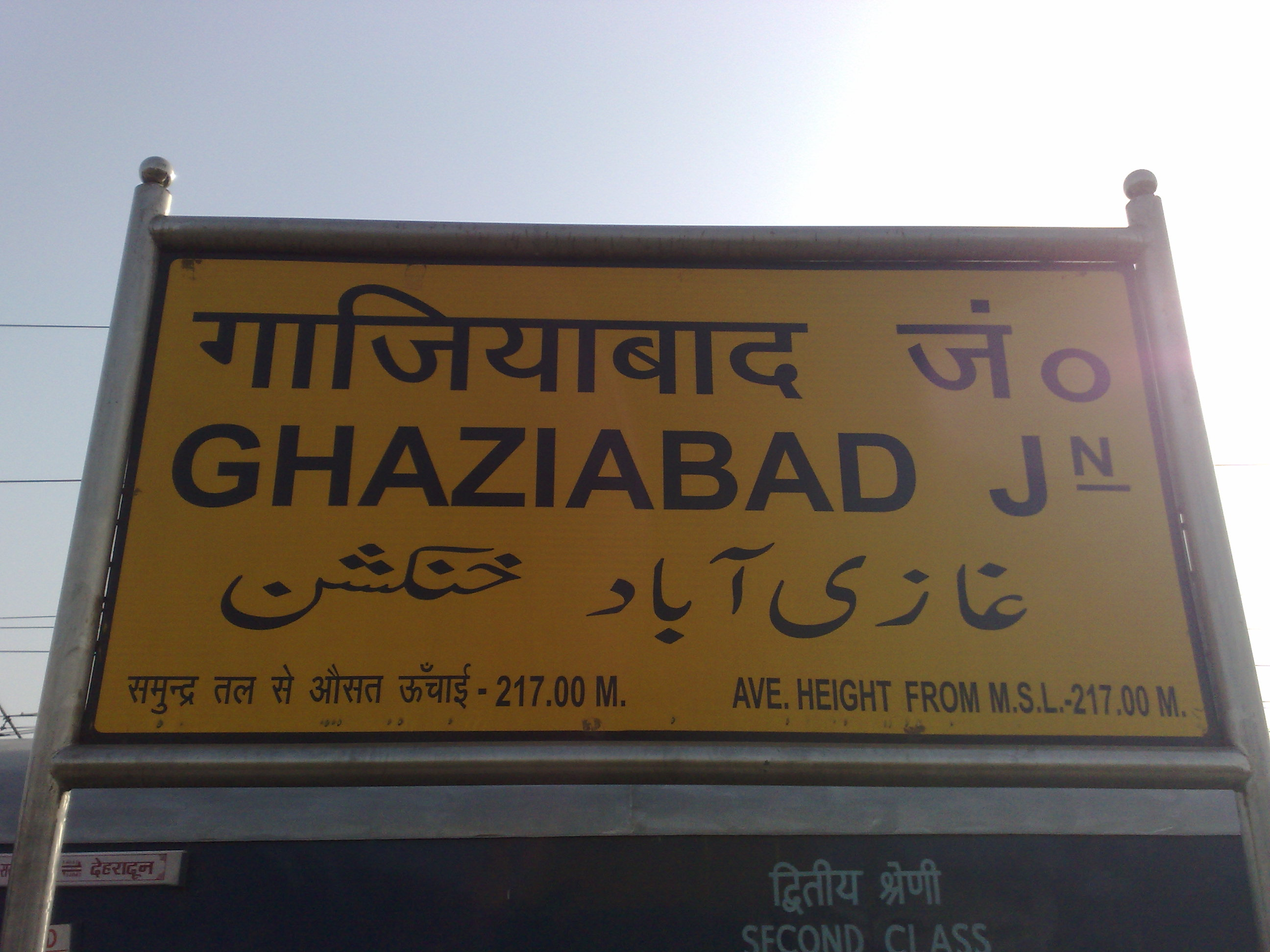
- Ghaziabad Junction is an important railway station on the Delhi–Moradabad line

Overview
- Status: Operational
- Owner: Indian Railways
- Locale: Delhi, Uttar Pradesh
- Termini: Old Delhi, New Delhi, Anand Vihar Terminal; Moradabad

Service
- Operator: Northern Railway

History
- Opened: 1900

Technical
- Line length: New Delhi–Moradabad: 166 km (103 mi); Gajraula–Najibabad: 107 km (66 mi)
- Track gauge: 5 ft 6 in (1,676 mm) broad gauge
- Operating speed: 110 km/h (68 mph)
- Highest elevation: New Delhi 239 m (784 ft), Moradabad 201 m (659 ft)

The New Delhi–Moradabad line is a railway line connecting Delhi and Moradabad in the Indian state of Uttar Pradesh. It also includes the Gajraula–Najibabad branch line. The line falls under the administrative jurisdiction of Northern Railway.

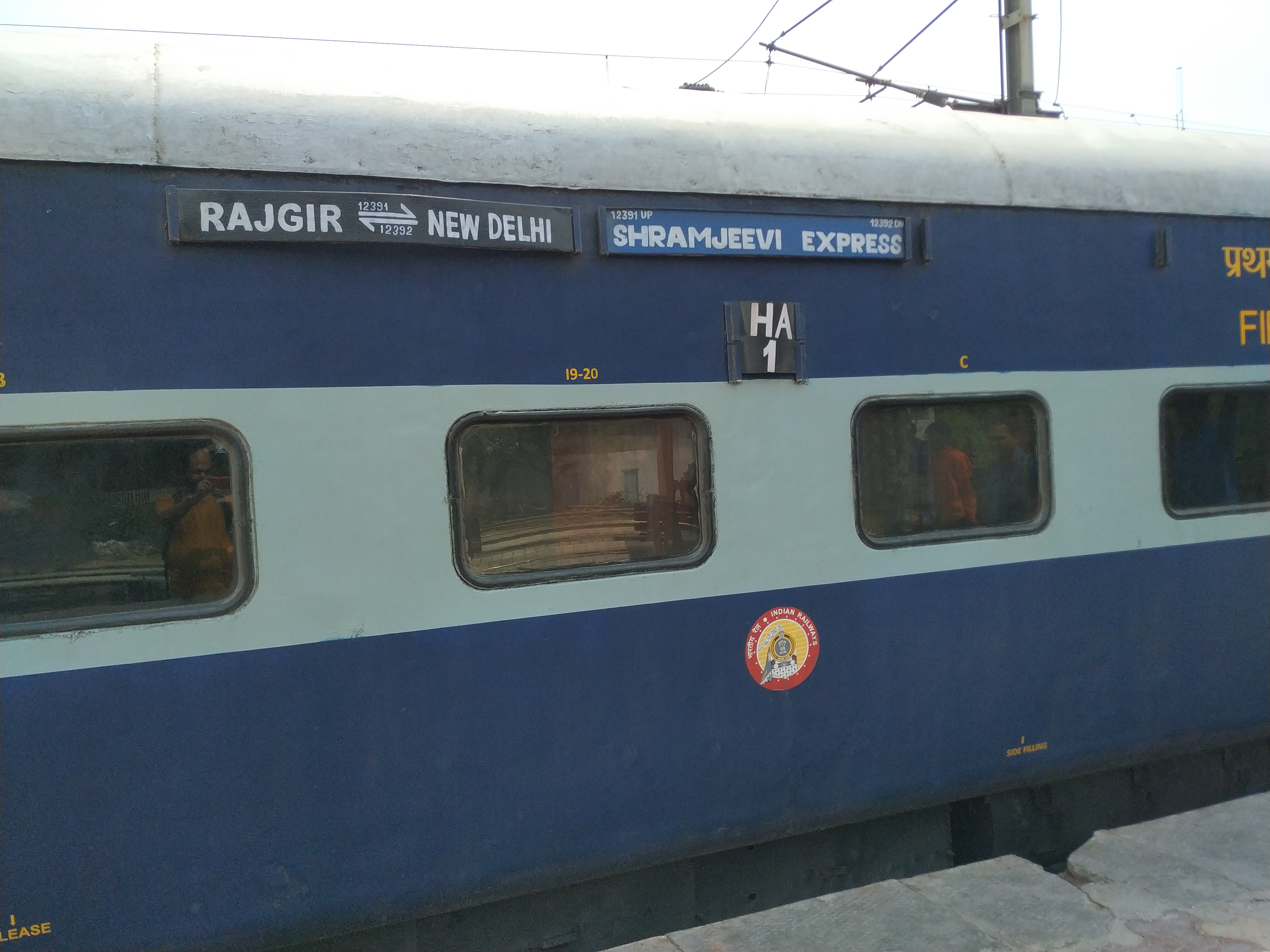
Shramjeevi Express on Delhi-Moradabad line

== History ==
The Ghaziabad–Moradabad link was established by Oudh and Rohilkhand Railway in 1900.

== Electrification ==
The Delhi–Ghaziabad–Hapur–Moradabad line has been a fully electrified double-track route since 19 January 2016, and the Gajraula–Najibabad branch line was electrified on 12 April 2019.

== Speed limit ==
The Delhi–Ghaziabad–Hapur–Moradabad line is classified as a "Group D" line with a maximum permissible speed of 110 km/h (68 mph), while the Gajraula–Najibabad branch line is classified as a "Group D" line with a maximum speed of 100 km/h (62 mph).

== Loco shed ==
The Ghaziabad electric loco shed serves the Delhi area. It housed 47 WAP-1 locomotives in 2008, along with WAM-4, WAP-4, WAP-5, WAP-7, and WAG-5HA locomotives. Following the electrification of the route, operations are primarily handled by electric locomotives.

== Passenger movement ==
Moradabad is the only station on this line among the top 100 booking stations of Indian Railways, though it does not have any originating mail or express trains.
