= Saint-Babel =

- Commune
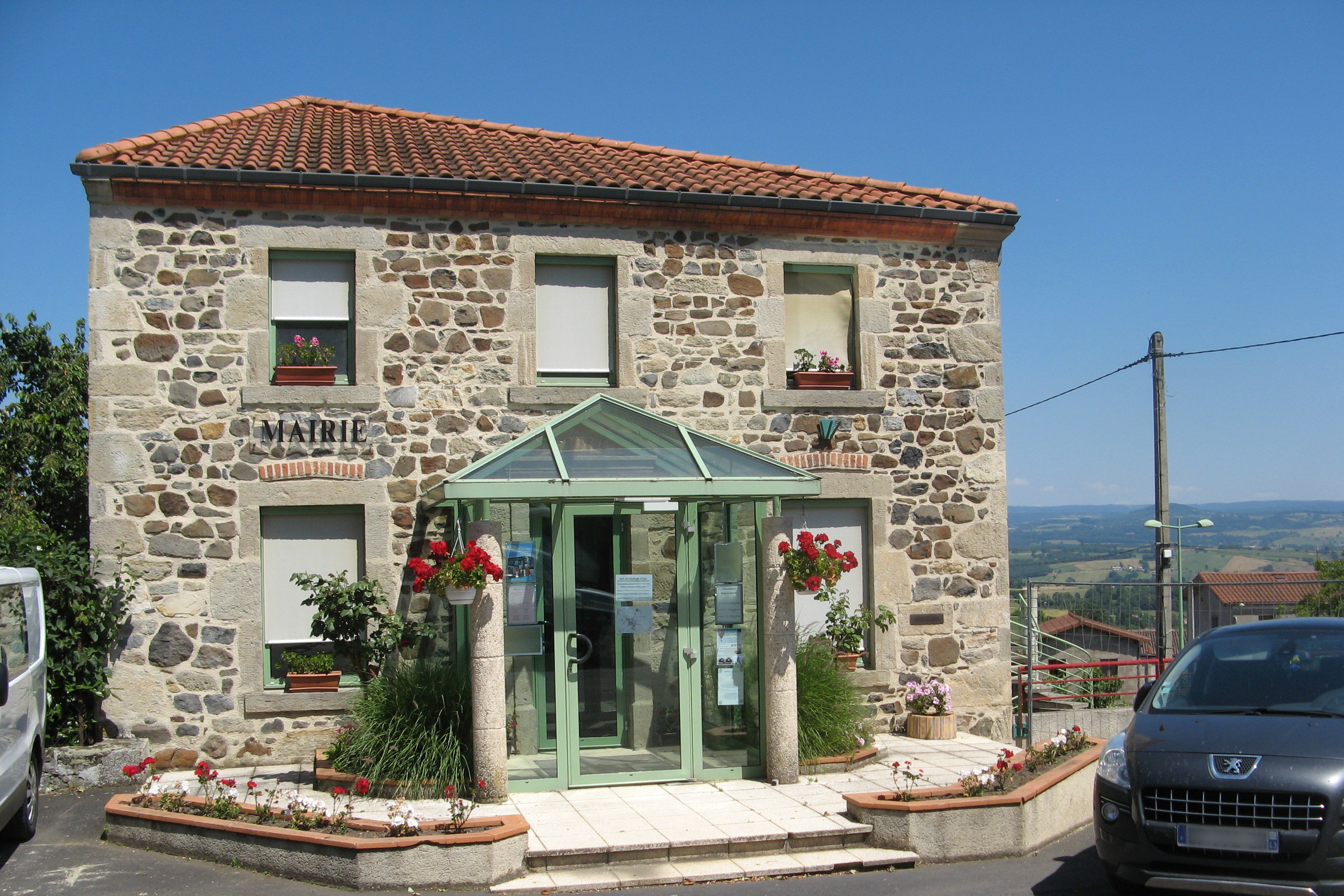
- The town hall in Saint-Babel
- Location of Saint-Babel
- Location within France Location within Auvergne-Rhône-Alpes
- Coordinates: 45°35′49″N 3°18′00″E
- Country: France
- Region: Auvergne-Rhône-Alpes
- Department: Puy-de-Dôme
- Arrondissement: Issoire
- Canton: Issoire
- Intercommunality: Agglo Pays d'Issoire

Government
  - Mayor (2026–32): Guy Archimbaud
- Area^{1}: 19.31 km^{2} (7.46 sq mi)
- Elevation: 500 m (1,600 ft)
- Highest elevation: 800 m (2,600 ft)
- Lowest elevation: 419 m (1,375 ft)
- Population (2023): 948
  - Density: 49.1/km^{2} (127/sq mi)
- Time zone: UTC+01:00 (CET)
  - Summer (DST): UTC+02:00 (CEST)
- INSEE/Postal code: 63321 /63500
- ^{1} French Land Register data, which excludes lakes, ponds, glaciers > 1 km^{2} (0.386 sq mi or 247 acres) and river estuaries.

Saint-Babel (French pronunciation: [sɛ̃ babɛl]) is a commune in the Puy-de-Dôme department in Auvergne in central France.

== See also ==
- Communes of the Puy-de-Dôme department
