= Flat, Puy-de-Dôme =

Flat
- Part of Aulhat-Flat
- Location of Flat
- Location within France Location within Auvergne-Rhône-Alpes
- Coordinates: 45°34′18″N 3°18′12″E
- Country: France
- Region: Auvergne-Rhône-Alpes
- Department: Puy-de-Dôme
- Arrondissement: Issoire
- Canton: Issoire
- Commune: Aulhat-Flat
- Area^{1}: 4.22 km^{2} (1.63 sq mi)
- Elevation: 471 m (1,545 ft)
- Highest elevation: 690 m (2,260 ft)
- Lowest elevation: 401 m (1,316 ft)
- Population (2022): 459
  - Density: 109/km^{2} (282/sq mi)
- Time zone: UTC+01:00 (CET)
  - Summer (DST): UTC+02:00 (CEST)
- Postal code: 63500
- ^{1} French Land Register data, which excludes lakes, ponds, glaciers > 1 km^{2} (0.386 sq mi or 247 acres) and river estuaries.

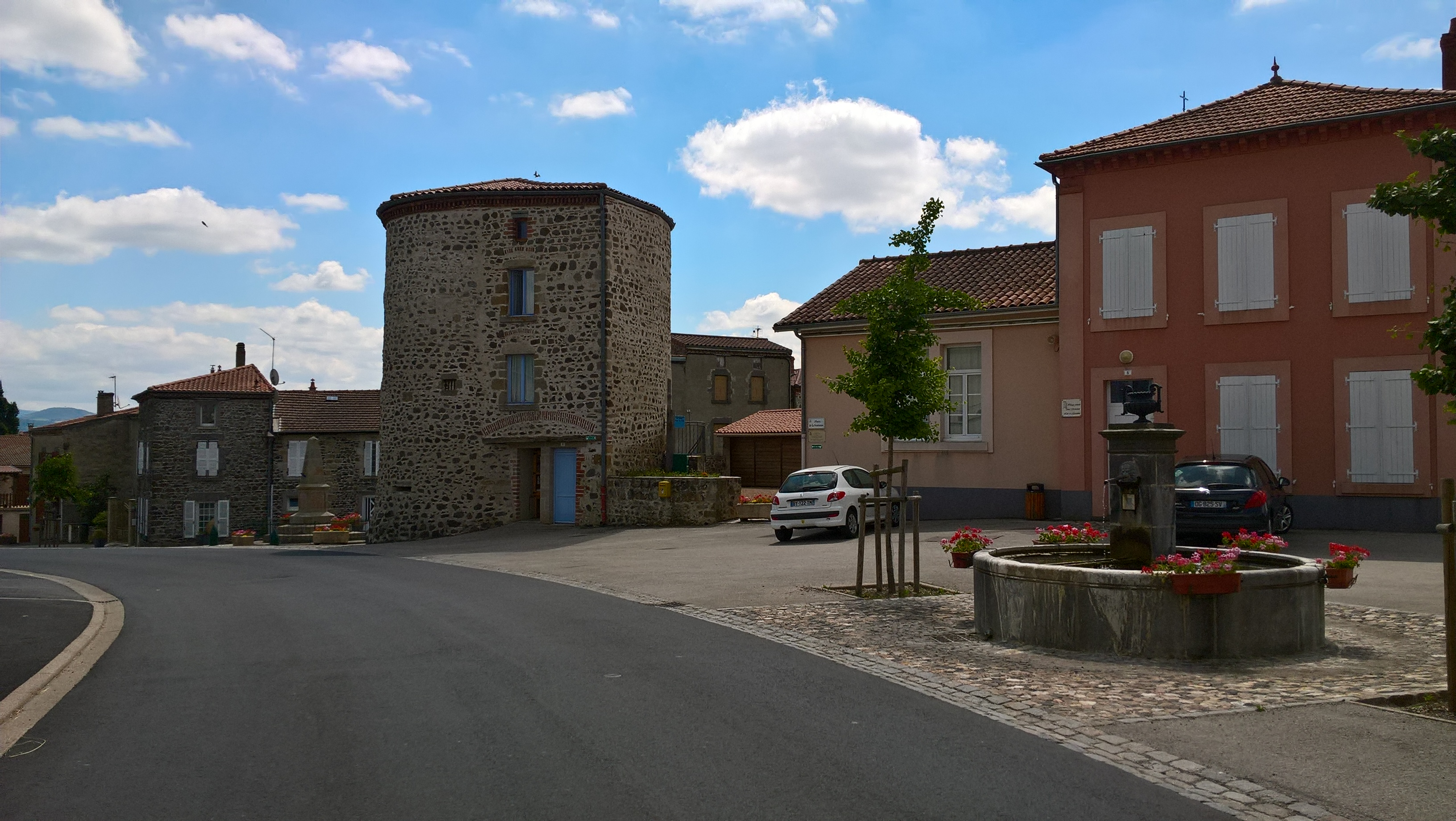
Flat

Flat (French pronunciation: [fla]) is a former commune in the Puy-de-Dôme department in Auvergne in central France. On 1 January 2016, it was merged into the new commune of Aulhat-Flat.

== See also ==
- Communes of the Puy-de-Dôme department
