= Flatness =

Flatness may refer to:

- Flatness (art)
- Flatness (cosmology)
- Flatness (liquids)
- Flatness (manufacturing), a geometrical tolerance required in certain manufacturing situations
- Flatness (systems theory), a property of nonlinear dynamic systems
- Spectral flatness
- Flat function in mathematical analysis
- Flat intonation
- Flat module in abstract algebra
- Flat morphism in algebraic geometry

== See also ==
- Flat (disambiguation)
- Flattening
