= Perrier, Puy-de-Dôme =

Perrier
- Commune
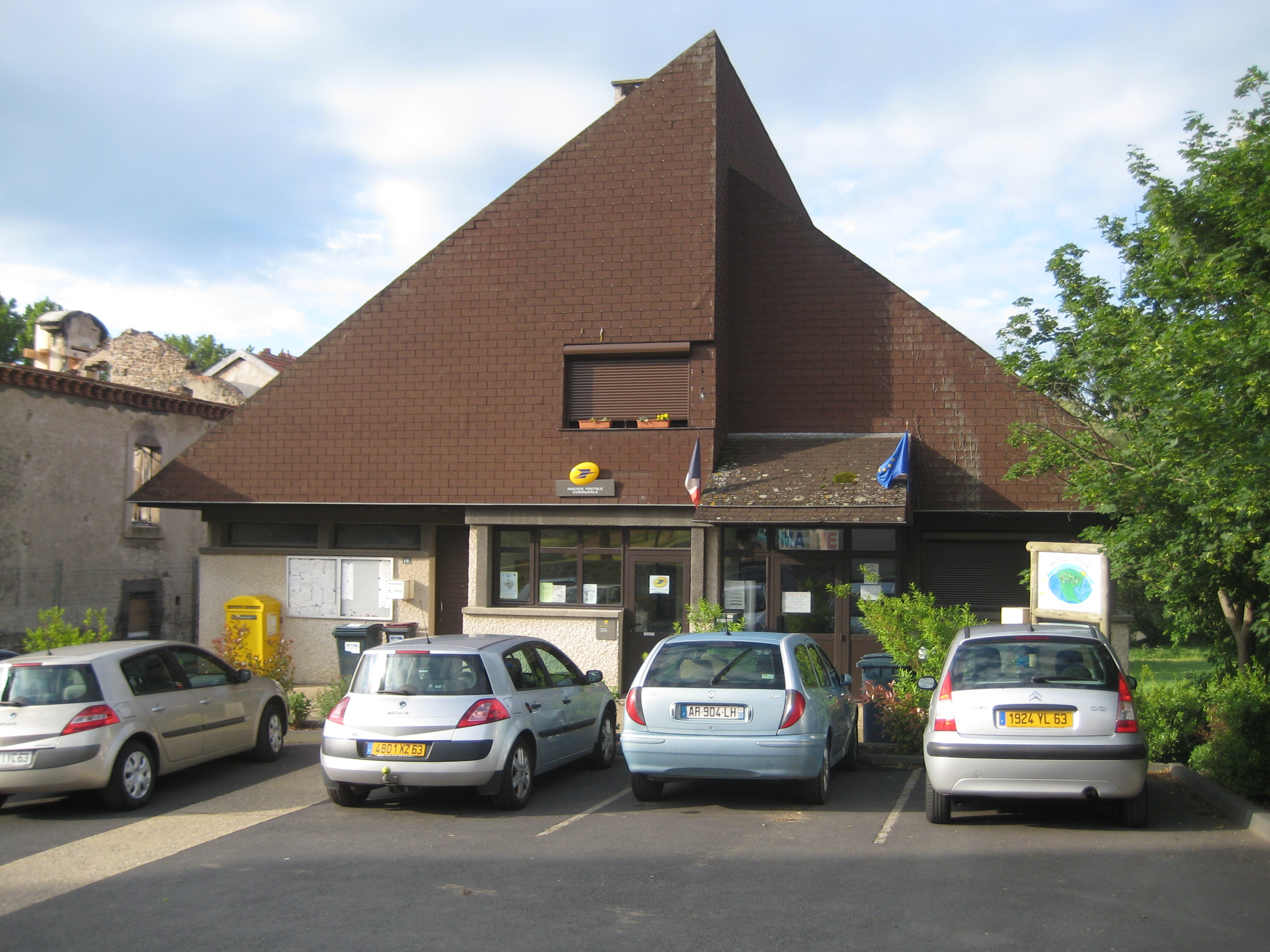
- The town hall in Perrier

- Coat of arms
- Location of Perrier
- Location within France Location within Auvergne-Rhône-Alpes
- Coordinates: 45°32′44″N 3°12′08″E
- Country: France
- Region: Auvergne-Rhône-Alpes
- Department: Puy-de-Dôme
- Arrondissement: Issoire
- Canton: Issoire
- Intercommunality: Agglo Pays d'Issoire

Government
  - Mayor (2026–32): Bernard Roux
- Area^{1}: 6.37 km^{2} (2.46 sq mi)
- Elevation: 430 m (1,410 ft)
- Highest elevation: 601 m (1,972 ft)
- Lowest elevation: 410 m (1,350 ft)
- Population (2023): 925
  - Density: 145/km^{2} (376/sq mi)
- Time zone: UTC+01:00 (CET)
  - Summer (DST): UTC+02:00 (CEST)
- INSEE/Postal code: 63275 /63500
- ^{1} French Land Register data, which excludes lakes, ponds, glaciers > 1 km^{2} (0.386 sq mi or 247 acres) and river estuaries.

Perrier (French pronunciation: [pɛʁje]) is a commune in the Puy-de-Dôme department in Auvergne in central France.

== See also ==
- Communes of the Puy-de-Dôme department
