= Flat Island =

Flat Island may refer to:

- Flat Island (Antarctica), in Robertson Bay
- Flat Island (Hong Kong)
- Flat Island (Spratly) in the South China Sea
- Flat Island (Falkland Islands) in the south Atlantic Ocean
- Flat Island Wildlife Sanctuary, in the Andaman Islands
- Flat Island, a former separate island now merged by recent volcanic activity with McDonald Island, in the southern Indian Ocean
- Flat Island, one of the Engineer Islands in southeast Papua New Guinea
- Île Plate, also known as Flat Island, a small island off the north coast of Mauritius
- Sandy Point, Newfoundland and Labrador

== See also ==
- Flat Islands (disambiguation)
- Flat Isles
- Flat Islet, Queensland
