= Brenat =

- Commune
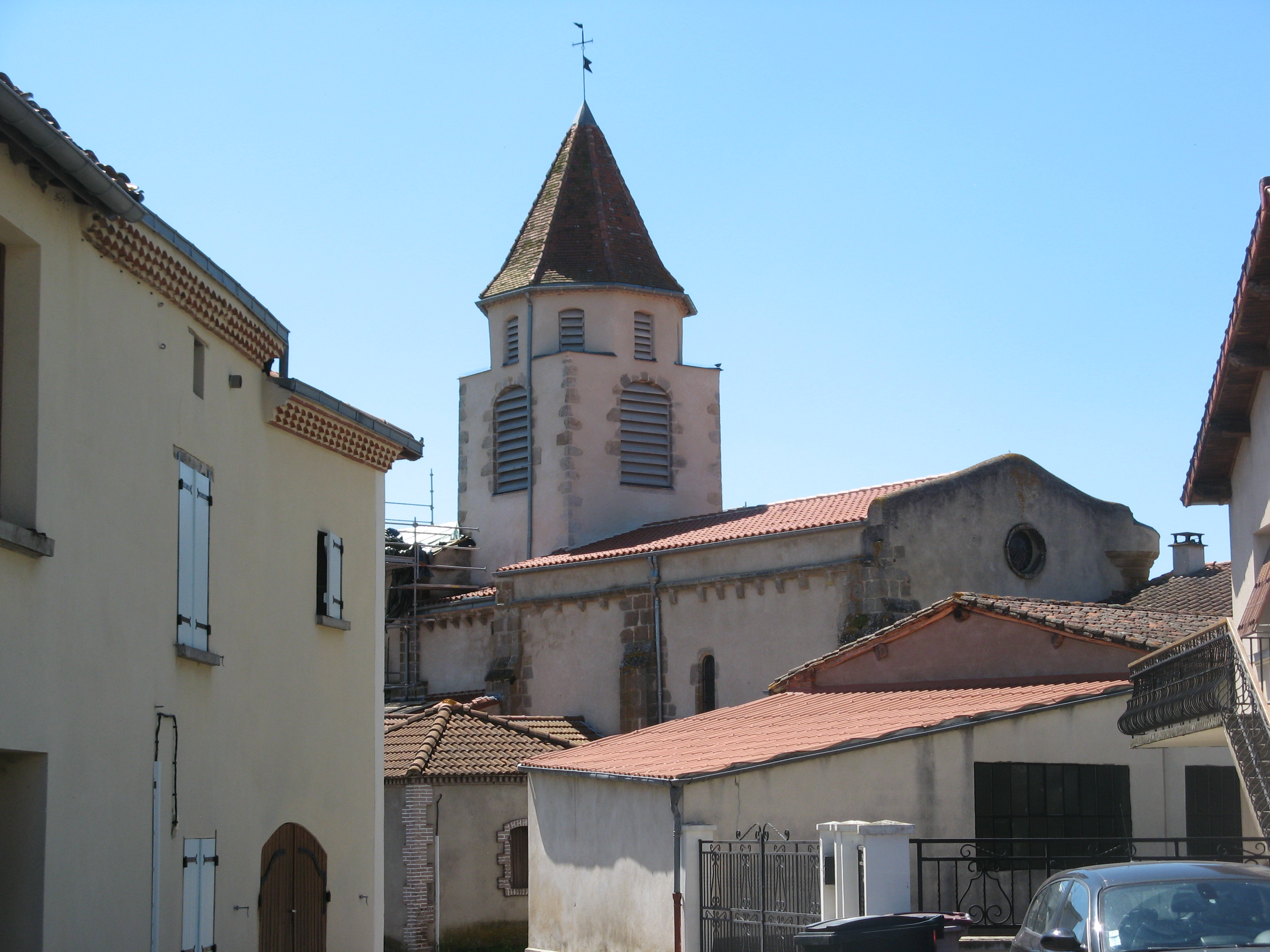
- The church in Brenat
- Location of Brenat
- Location within France Location within Auvergne-Rhône-Alpes
- Coordinates: 45°33′10″N 3°18′36″E
- Country: France
- Region: Auvergne-Rhône-Alpes
- Department: Puy-de-Dôme
- Arrondissement: Issoire
- Canton: Issoire
- Intercommunality: Agglo Pays d'Issoire

Government
  - Mayor (2020–2026): Lionel Suty
- Area^{1}: 8.83 km^{2} (3.41 sq mi)
- Elevation: 400 m (1,300 ft)
- Highest elevation: 543 m (1,781 ft)
- Lowest elevation: 372 m (1,220 ft)
- Population (2023): 629
  - Density: 71.2/km^{2} (184/sq mi)
- Time zone: UTC+01:00 (CET)
  - Summer (DST): UTC+02:00 (CEST)
- INSEE/Postal code: 63051 /63500
- ^{1} French Land Register data, which excludes lakes, ponds, glaciers > 1 km^{2} (0.386 sq mi or 247 acres) and river estuaries.

Brenat is a commune in the Puy-de-Dôme department in Auvergne-Rhône-Alpes in central France.

== Population ==
Historical population
Year	Pop.	±% p.a.
1968	370	—
1975	374	+0.15%
1982	413	+1.43%
1990	483	+1.98%
1999	464	−0.44%
2007	544	+2.01%
2012	590	+1.64%
2017	622	+1.06%
2023	629	+0.19%
Source: INSEE

== See also ==
- Communes of the Puy-de-Dôme department
