= Meilhaud =

- Commune
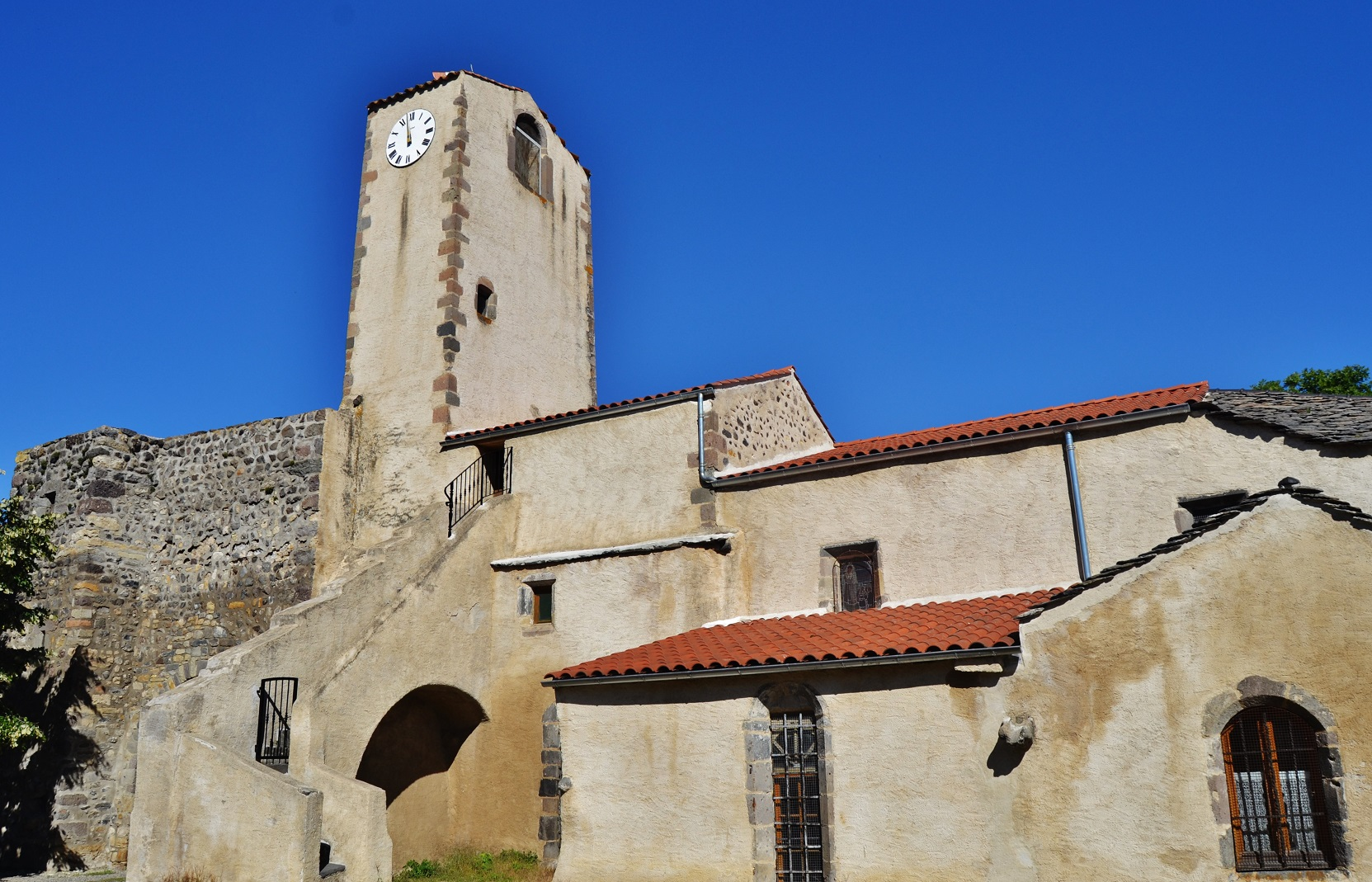
- The church in Meilhaud
- Location of Meilhaud
- Location within France Location within Auvergne-Rhône-Alpes
- Coordinates: 45°32′45″N 3°09′47″E
- Country: France
- Region: Auvergne-Rhône-Alpes
- Department: Puy-de-Dôme
- Arrondissement: Issoire
- Canton: Issoire
- Intercommunality: Agglo Pays d'Issoire

Government
  - Mayor (2026–32): Jean-Marie Corre
- Area^{1}: 4.47 km^{2} (1.73 sq mi)
- Elevation: 400 m (1,300 ft)
- Highest elevation: 581 m (1,906 ft)
- Lowest elevation: 429 m (1,407 ft)
- Population (2023): 507
  - Density: 113/km^{2} (294/sq mi)
- Time zone: UTC+01:00 (CET)
  - Summer (DST): UTC+02:00 (CEST)
- INSEE/Postal code: 63222 /63320
- ^{1} French Land Register data, which excludes lakes, ponds, glaciers > 1 km^{2} (0.386 sq mi or 247 acres) and river estuaries.

Meilhaud (French pronunciation: [mɛjo]; Occitan: Melhau) is a commune in the Puy-de-Dôme department in Auvergne in central France.

== See also ==
- Communes of the Puy-de-Dôme department
