= List of English words of Afrikaans origin =

Words of Afrikaans origin have entered other languages. British English has absorbed Afrikaans words primarily via British soldiers who served in the Boer Wars. Many more words have entered common usage in South African English due to the parallel nature of the English and Afrikaner cultures in South Africa. Afrikaans words have unusual spelling patterns.

Most of these words describe the African flora, fauna or landscape.

== Internationally common ==
- Afrikaans (noun: name of language, from "african") derivative: Afrikaner (person who speaks Afrikaans as their native tongue), plural: Afrikaners
- apartheid (literally "apart-ness"): also the name of a period of segregation in the country during 1948–1994
- bergwind (warm dry wind blowing from the plateau to the coast)
- biltong (literally "rump tongue/strip"): dried cured red-meat, similar to Jerky. Has a boerewors equivalent known as Droëwors
- Boer (literally "farmer"): due to the large number of Afrikaans-speaking farmers, the term is exclusively used among Afrikaners for displaying national pride.
- boerewors (literally "farmer's sausage"): a juicy mixed-spice and mixed-meat sausage
- Highveld: a raised plateau stretching from the eastern side of the Free State (province) up north including the provinces of Gauteng and North West. Due to its location in Gauteng, the city of Johannesburg is the highest urban settlement by elevation.
- kraal: African village within a stockade, from Portuguese curral
- kommando (originally a mounted infantry unit raised to retrieve stolen livestock)
- kop, or koppie (literally "head" or "cup", an African monadnock): Koppie can also refer to a small hill.
- laager: A collection of vehicles in a circle, meant for protection.
- lapa: Thatched roof structure supported by wooden poles. Lapas are commonly used as semi-open entertainment areas.
- rand: (literally "edge", "rim" or "ridge"): also the name of the South African currency, named after the Witwatersrand (White waters' ridge).
- rooibos: (literally "red bush"): a bush, endemic to South Africa, used to make a herbal tea also called rooibos.
- rondavel: A round hut.
- sjambok: (an ox-hide whip): used by the South African Police Service for riot control, formerly used as a disciplinary tool for misbehaving school children.
- spoor (literally "tracks" or "footprints"): the Afrikaans "spoorweë" refers specifically to the National Train Route, often indirectly as the train-tracks as well.
- trek (literally "draw", or "haul"): Popularized in English by "Die Groot Trek" (The Great Trek).
- veld: literally "field" or natural African bush vegetation
- ystervarkies (literally "iron piglets"; translates as porcupine/hedgehog): the South African name for Lamingtons.

=== Common names ===
Afrikaans (or Cape Dutch) common names for plants and animals often entered the English vernacular:

- aardvark (literally "earth pig"): Also known as an Anteater
- aardwolf: literally "earth wolf"
- boomslang (literally "tree snake"): A highly venomous bright green tree snake
- blesbok (literally "bald buck")
- bontebok (literally "mottled buck")
- dassie (from Dutch, English translation Hyrax; see also dassie rat)
- duiker (literally "diver")
- eland (from Dutch, meaning "elk"): The largest known species of antelope
- grysbok (literally "grey buck")
- klipspringer (literally "rock jumper")
- korhaan (from Dutch, meaning "black grouse")
- leguan / leguaan (corruption of "likkewaan")
- Naartjie (from Afrikaans meaning tangerine or mandarin)
- meerkat (literally "lake cat")
- padloper (literally "path walker")
- platanna (from Dutch "plathander", meaning "flat handed creature")
- rinkhals (literally "ring throat"): also known as the ring-necked spitting cobra
- springbok (literally "jumping buck"): the national animal of South Africa
- "white" in "white rhinoceros" may be from wyd meaning "wide" (describing the animal's mouth). Modern Afrikaans also say "Wit Renoster", meaning White Rhinoceros.

=== Cape Dutch ===
There are also several English words derived from Cape Dutch, a forerunner of Afrikaans:

- hartebeest (modern Afrikaans equivalent is hartebees)
- scoff/skoff (as in scoffing food): from Cape Dutch schoff, the word did not find its way into modern Afrikaans
- veldt borrowed again by English in the modern form veld
- wildebeest (modern Afrikaans equivalent is wildebees)

== Common in South African English ==
There are almost innumerable borrowings from Afrikaans in South African English.

== See also ==
- South African English
- List of South African slang words
