= Onslaught =

Onslaught may refer to:

== Characters ==
- Onslaught (Marvel Comics), a Marvel Comics supervillain
- Onslaught (DC Comics), a DC Comics team of Quraci terrorists
- Onslaught (Transformers), the leader of the Combaticons in the Transformers series

== Games ==
- Onslaught (Magic: The Gathering), an expansion to the Magic: The Gathering collectible card game
- Onslaught, a gametype in the first-person shooter computer game Unreal Tournament 2004
- Onslaught (1989 video game), a 1989 Amiga beat'em up computer game
- Onslaught (2009 video game), a 2009 Wii first-person shooter video game
- A co-op mode in the video game Battlefield: Bad Company 2
- ONSlaught, a libre game engine cloning the proprietary engine NScripter
- Mortal Kombat: Onslaught, a 2023 role-playing video game by NetherRealm Studios

== Other ==
- Onslaught (film), a 2026 action horror film produced by A24
- Onslaught (band), a British thrash metal band
- Onslaught, a 2002 science fiction novel by David Sherman
- Onslaught (Dove), a short film/advertisement made by Dove for their Campaign for Real Beauty
