= Flat Island Wildlife Sanctuary =

In the Andaman Islands

Flat Island
- Location within Andaman and Nicobar Islands

Geography
- Location: Bay of Bengal
- Coordinates: 12.535°N 92.675°E
- Archipelago: Andaman Islands
- Adjacent to: Indian Ocean
- Area: 2.48 km^{2} (0.96 sq mi)
- Length: 2.1 km (1.3 mi)
- Width: 1.6 km (0.99 mi)
- Coastline: 6.53 km (4.058 mi)
- Highest elevation: 0 m (0 ft)

Administration
- India
- District: North and Middle Andaman
- Island group: Andaman Islands
- Island sub-group: Great Andaman
- Taluk: Mayabunder Taluk

Demographics
- Population: 0 (2016)

Additional information
- Time zone: IST (UTC+5:30)
- PIN: 744202
- Telephone code: 031927
- ISO code: IN-AN-00
- Official website: www.and.nic.in
- Literacy: 84.4%
- Avg. summer temperature: 30.2 °C (86.4 °F)
- Avg. winter temperature: 23.0 °C (73.4 °F)
- Sex ratio: 1.2♂/♀
- Census Code: 35.639.0004
- Official Languages: Hindi, English

Flat Island is an island of the Andaman Islands. It belongs to the North and Middle Andaman administrative district, part of the Indian union territory of Andaman and Nicobar Islands. the island is lying 150 km (93 mi) north from Port Blair.

== Geography ==
The island is situated 2.3 km (1 mi) west of Great Andaman near the shores of Yadita village. And also this island wild life will be protected by the government and the flat island is also known as 2nd wild life sanctuary in the country

== Administration ==
Politically, Flat Island is part of Rangat Tehsil.

== Fauna ==
The island is the location of a wildlife sanctuary, although there is no station on the island.
