= Flat River =

Flat River may refer to:

== Rivers ==
- Flat River (Northwest Territories), a tributary of the South Nahanni River
- Flat River (Louisiana)
- Flat River (Missouri), a tributary of the Big River
- Flat River (Michigan)
- Flat River (North Carolina)
- Flat River (South Branch Pawtuxet River), a river in Kent County, Rhode Island
- Flat River (Wood River), a river in Kent and Washington County, Rhode Island

== Inhabited places ==
- Flat River, Missouri, the former name of Park Hills, Missouri
