= Flat Islands =

Flat Islands may refer to:

- Flat Islands (Antarctica)
- Flat Islands, Bonavista Bay, Newfoundland and Labrador
- Flat Islands, Placentia Bay, Newfoundland and Labrador

== See also ==
- Flat Island (disambiguation)
- Flat Isles
- Flat Islet, Queensland
