= Amy Flatten =

American expert on international scientific collaboration

Amy K. Flatten is an American expert on international scientific collaboration, the Director of International Affairs for the American Physical Society.

== Education and career ==
Flatten is from Clearwater, Florida, and has a master's degree and Ph.D. in engineering science and mechanics from Georgia Tech, with a 1993 doctoral dissertation research concerning fiber optics. She worked as a high-tech industry consultant from 1995 to 1998. From 1998 to 1999 she was in the National Telecommunications and Information Administration. From 1999 to 2004 she worked in the White House Office of Science and Technology Policy, where she led the OSTP program on US–Russian scientific relations and the office's collaborations with the Global Science Forum of the Organization of Economic Cooperation and Development. Along with her full-time positions, she also was an instructor at Johns Hopkins University in its part-time program in engineering and the sciences from 1995-2005, where she earned the 2000 Excellence in Teaching award. .

She joined the American Physical Society as Director of International Affairs in 2004.

== Recognition ==
Flatten was elected as a Fellow of the American Physical Society in 2018, after a nomination from the APS Forum on International Physics, "in recognition of her program development serving physicists worldwide, especially in support of scientists in the Middle East through the SESAME Travel Award Program, and for fostering new opportunities for international collaboration among young physicists from diverse cultural backgrounds".

== Personal life ==
Beyond her scientific work, Flatten is an abstract oil painter, exhibiting her works in the Washington, D.C. area.
