= Flats (band) =

English sludge metal band

- Origin: London, England
- Genre: Punk
- Years active: 2010–2012 (hiatus)
- Label: Sweat Shop Records
- Members: Daniel Devine, Craig E. Pierce, Paul Angeles, Samir Eskanda
- Past members: Luke Tristram
- Website: https://www.flatsofcourse.co.uk

Flats are an English punk/sludge metal band from East London (with roots in both Palestine and South Wales also). They have their own imprint, Sweat Shop Records, with their last record released in conjunction with Derrick Birkett's One Little Indian Records (who played in Flux of Pink Indians – an influence on the band's early sound). They enjoyed a fast rise to the spotlight being called 'the most important band since the Sex Pistols' by one journalist.

In 2012, the band went on hiatus due to their lead singer Daniel Devine (estranged son of a Creation Records founder/The Libertines manager Alan McGee) serving a sentence at Pentonville Prison, London.

== Background ==
Flats formed in February 2010, and are made up of Craig E. Pierce (bass/vocals), Daniel Devine (vocals), Paul Angeles (guitar) and Samir Eskanda (drums). Their original guitarist Luke Tristram was replaced by Angeles in April 2011. They made their live debut in March 2010. Flats have stated that their influences include Crass, Chron Gen, Anthrax and Hellhammer

They released two EPs on 7" vinyl in 2010; Flats EP and Flats EP2 through their own label Sweat Shop Records in conjunction with Loog. Their single "Never Again" was released through Sweat Shop Records and One Little Indian in March 2011 on 7" and download. Their debut album Better Living was released in March '12. They have recorded all released music themselves, mixed and produced by Pierce.

Flats have become renowned for their raucous live shows that often clock in at less than 15 minutes and end in with at least one band member bleeding and several smashed guitars . In 2010 they supported The Horrors, Klaxons and played at the 1234 festival and Offset Festival, as well as being the opening band on that year's NME Radar tour with The Joy Formidable and Chapel Club. In 2011 they were Morrissey's main support band for the UK leg of his European tour, as well as supporting the US sludge metal band Eyehategod and performing at Sonisphere festival at Knebworth House.

== Discography ==
- Flats EP (2010) – Sweat Shop Records
- Flats EP2 (2010) – Sweat Shop Records
- "Never Again" (2011) – Sweat Shop Records
- "Better Living" (2012) – Sweat Shop Records/One Little Indian
