= Deck (surname) =

Deck is a surname. Notable people with the surname include:

- Brian Deck, American record producer
- Gabriel Deck (born 1995), Argentine basketball player
- James George Deck (1807–1884), New Zealand evangelist
- John N. Deck (1921–1979), Canadian philosopher
- Lucius Linton Deck, Junior (1929–2015), school administrator
- Nathan Deck (born 1990), Canadian ice hockey player
- René Deck (born 1945), Swiss footballer
- Théodore Deck (1823–1891), French ceramicist
- Woody Deck (born 1983), American poker player
