= Pardines, Puy-de-Dôme =

Pardines
- Commune
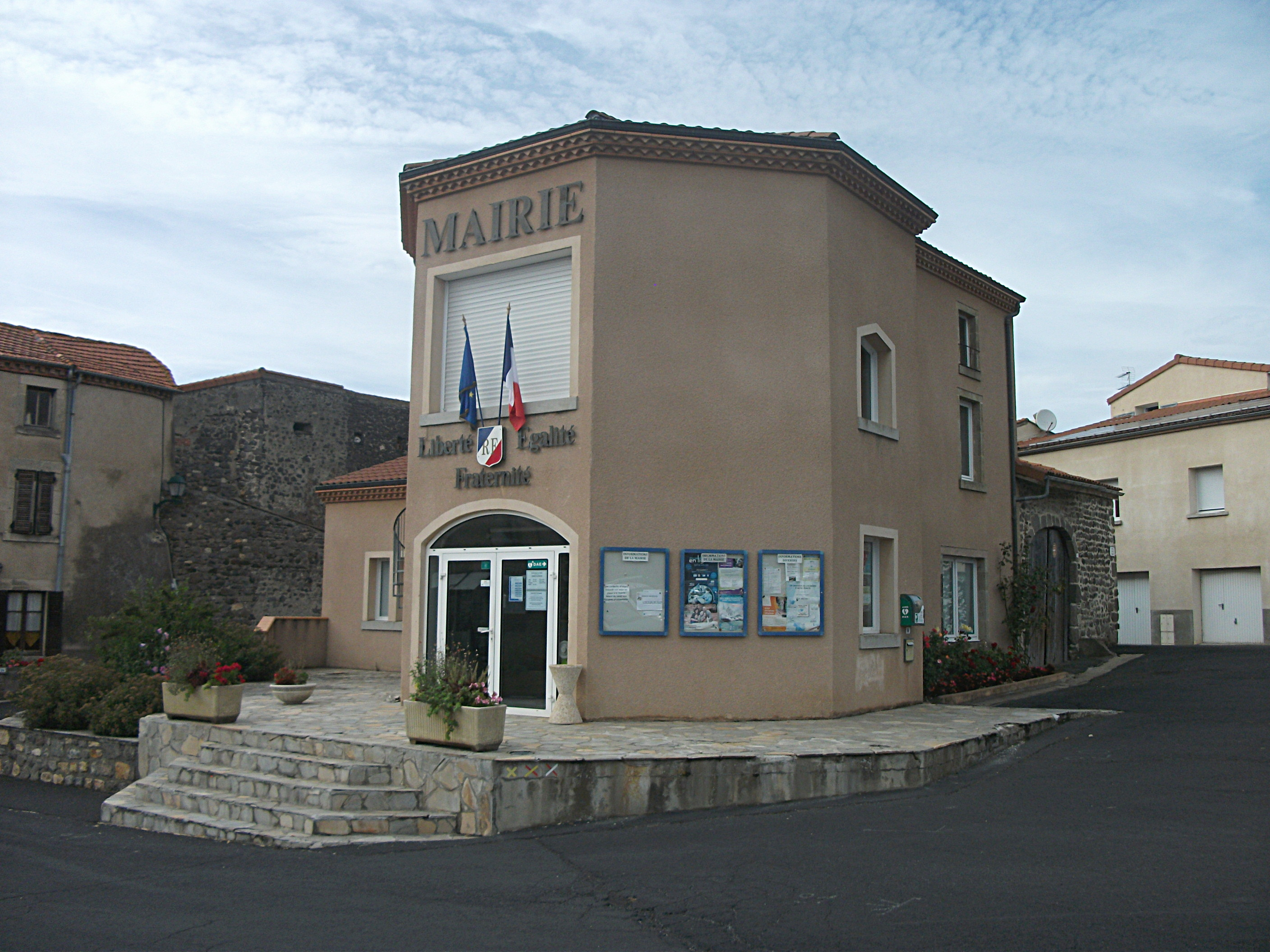
- Town hall

- Coat of arms
- Location of Pardines
- Location within France Location within Auvergne-Rhône-Alpes
- Coordinates: 45°33′47″N 3°10′26″E
- Country: France
- Region: Auvergne-Rhône-Alpes
- Department: Puy-de-Dôme
- Arrondissement: Issoire
- Canton: Issoire
- Intercommunality: Agglo Pays d'Issoire

Government
  - Mayor (2020–2026): Josiane Gomes-Letellier
- Area^{1}: 5.18 km^{2} (2.00 sq mi)
- Elevation: 600 m (2,000 ft)
- Highest elevation: 620 m (2,030 ft)
- Lowest elevation: 446 m (1,463 ft)
- Population (2023): 302
  - Density: 58.3/km^{2} (151/sq mi)
- Time zone: UTC+01:00 (CET)
  - Summer (DST): UTC+02:00 (CEST)
- INSEE/Postal code: 63268 /63500
- ^{1} French Land Register data, which excludes lakes, ponds, glaciers > 1 km^{2} (0.386 sq mi or 247 acres) and river estuaries.

Pardines (French pronunciation: [paʁdin]) is a commune in the Puy-de-Dôme department in Auvergne-Rhône-Alpes in central France.

== See also ==
- Communes of the Puy-de-Dôme department
