= Lockheed Flatbed =

Cargo aircraft design

"Flatbed"
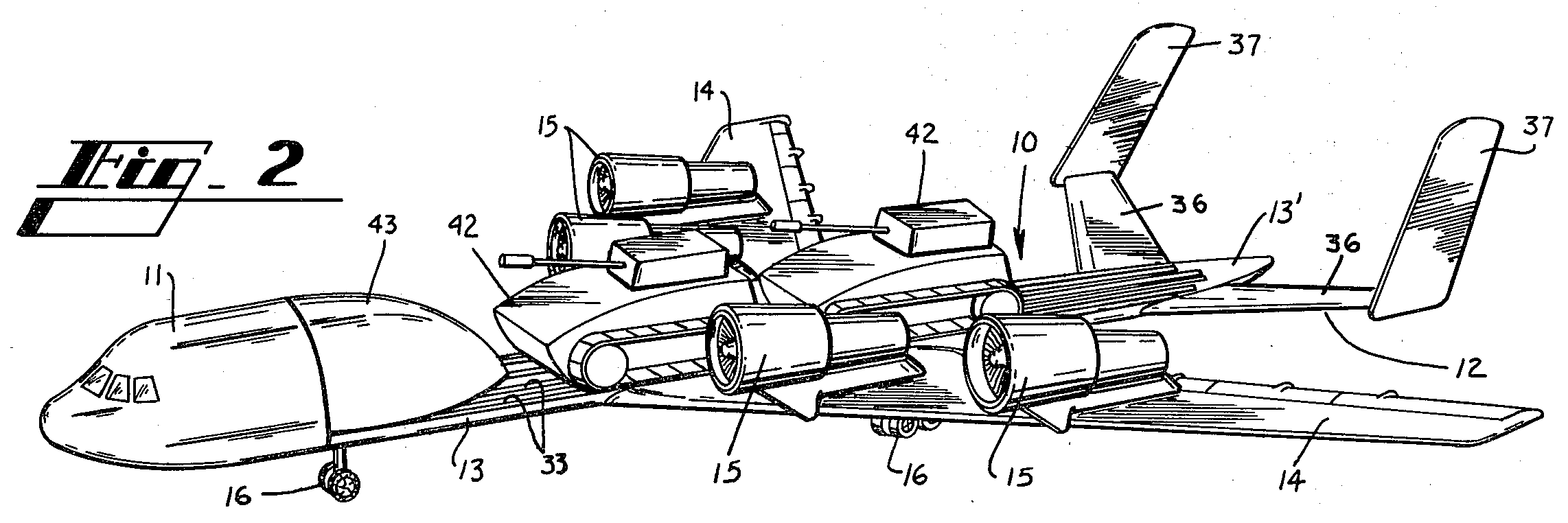
- US Patent illustration

General information
- Type: Military transport
- Manufacturer: Lockheed
- Status: Design study only

The Lockheed "Flatbed" was a proposed cargo aircraft design from the 1980s that mounted large loads "in the open" on the back of the aircraft, similar to a flatbed truck. The name "flatbed" was unofficial, as a more formal name was never assigned. Although there was a fair amount of public information released about the design in the early 1980s, the design was never picked up by the US Air Force and disappeared by the mid-80s.

== Design and development ==
Conventional cargo designs generally "mass out" before they "bulk out", meaning that they often fly mostly empty inside. In this case the aircraft is carrying around a large fuselage for no reason, adding mass and drag and thereby lowering performance. Nevertheless, they need to have oversized cargo bays for the cases where they have to carry bulky loads, rare as these may be. Lockheed's patent states:

Historically, transport airplanes have generally been specifically designed to haul either cargo, passengers, or outsize cargo. ... Military cargo aircraft, such as the C-130 and C-141, are designed to haul cargo and some vehicles –but not outsize cargo such as tanks or bridge launchers. The C-5A can carry all militarily defined outsize cargo and large commercial vehicles. Some later military cargo airplanes can carry some outsize vehicles/equipment, but the price is paid in terms of carrying a large fuselage around for the few times such outsize cargo is actually carried. ... Thus an idea transport airplane is considered to be one which is designed to utilize one common airframe to carry passengers, cargo and outsize equipment.

The Flatbed concept avoided these problems by designing the aircraft primarily for massing out, the most common problem. An airliner-sized fuselage is all that is needed for this role. In the case when the aircraft was called upon to carry an oversized load, the cargo bay would be removed, and the cargo chained directly to the back of the aircraft, in the open. Although performance would be greatly degraded due to drag, this would be more than made up for on all the other flights where a more suitable fuselage size was being used.

In keeping with the flatbed concept, the aircraft was designed to sit low to the ground. Trucks would drive up to the aircraft and push their loads onto the back. The bed of the aircraft consisted of parallel I-beams as the primary load-carrying structure, with metal sheeting on the top to provide a smooth walking surface. Like most cargo aircraft, rollers could be raised through small holes cut in the bed to allow palletted loads to be rolled on and off without requiring a forklift.

In a conventional cargo aircraft the wing is high-mounted to keep the underslung engines as far from the ground as possible. This avoids foreign object damage (FOD) when operating from dirty runways or dirt airfields. This layout also demands that the fuselage be supported from the top, essentially hanging from the wing's spars. For the Flatbed this would not be appropriate because the loads would be carried on top of the aircraft, not hung under it, so Lockheed moved the wing to the low-mounted position similar to most airliners. In order to avoid FOD, the engines were placed above the wing on pylons, which is aerodynamically similar on a modern symmetrical wing planform.

Likewise, most cargo aircraft use some version of a T-tail in order to leave the area at the end of the cargo bay "open" so trucks can approach it. This requires the tail to be high-mounted on the fuselage, so, as with the wings, this approach would not work on the Flatbed. Instead a large V-tail was used, extending outward from a point forward of the loading area, placing the rudders well to either side of the bed. In order to allow loading and unloading at the same time, the cockpit area at the nose of the aircraft could be rotated to the right, allowing trucks to approach both ends. The aircraft has a number of design features in common with the Lockheed L-1011, most obviously the crew cabin and cockpit area, and the overall size and layout.

The patent application shows it carrying two tanks (looking more like M4 Shermans than anything modern), and they also released concept artwork displaying various truck-like palletted loads mounted in a similar fashion. In these cases a small aerodynamic fairing was placed behind the cockpit area, which is flat at the rear, turning it into a sort of "pod". In most cases cargo would be carried under a cargo fairing that extended from the cockpit all the way to the tail, turning it into a fairly conventional-looking design, if somewhat "skinny" compared to traditional cargo designs like the C-5 Galaxy. Additionally, they proposed a passenger carrying module the same size as the cargo fairing. These modules could be unloaded as a single unit, sliding forward off the bed to a special-purpose truck.
