= Canton of Issoire =

Coordinates: 45.54°N 3.25°E

Issoire
- Canton
- Interactive map of Issoire
- Country: France
- Region: Auvergne-Rhône-Alpes
- Department: Puy-de-Dôme
- No. of communes: {{{nbcomm}}}

Government
  - Representatives (2021–2028): Bertrand Barraud; Isabelle Vallée
- Area: 112.62 km^{2} (43.48 sq mi)
- Population (2023): 21,429
  - Density: 190.28/km^{2} (492.82/sq mi)
- INSEE code: 63 18

The canton of Issoire is an administrative division of the Puy-de-Dôme department, central France. Its borders were modified at the French canton reorganisation which came into effect in March 2015. Its seat is in Issoire.

== Composition ==
It consists of the following communes:

1. Aulhat-Flat
2. Brenat
3. Le Broc
4. Issoire
5. Meilhaud
6. Orbeil
7. Pardines
8. Perrier
9. Saint-Babel
10. Saint-Yvoine

== Councillors ==
Election	Councillors	Party	Occupation
2015	Bertrand Barraud	LR	Mayor of Issoire
2015	Jocelyne Bouquet	DVD	Councillor of Le Broc

== Pictures of the canton ==
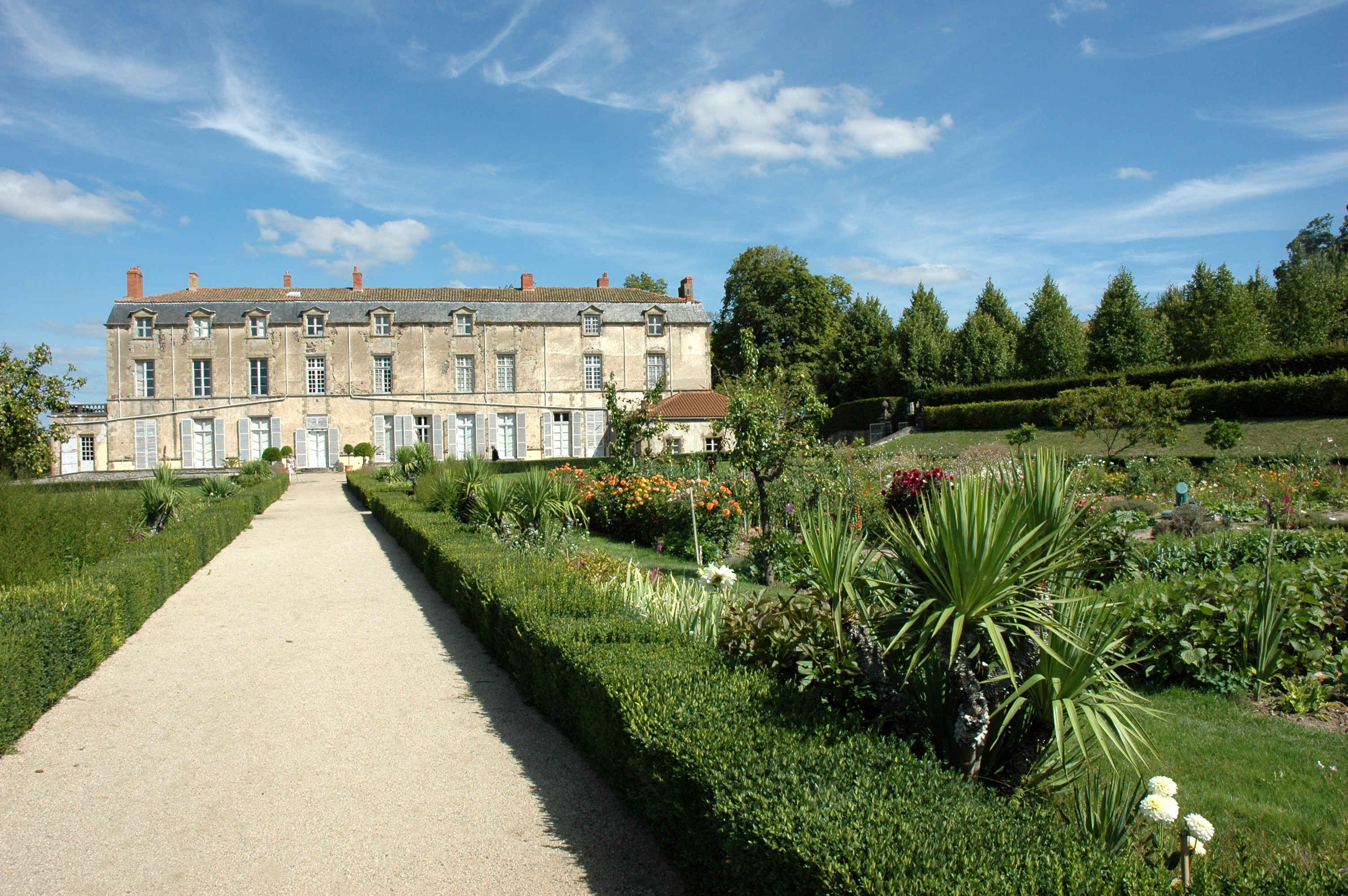
Castle Hauterive in Issoire

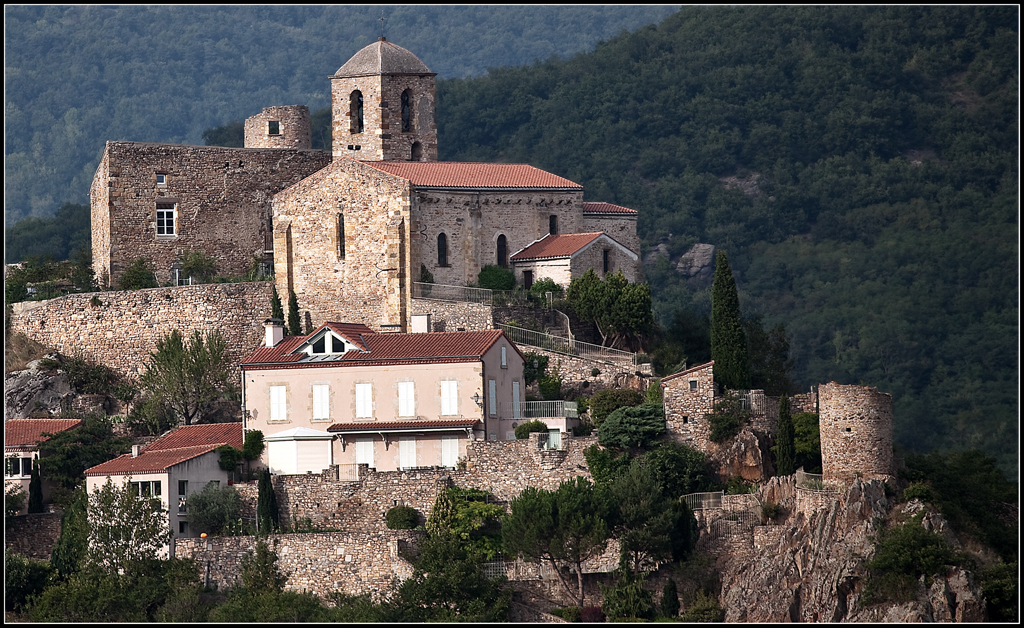
View of Saint-Yvoine

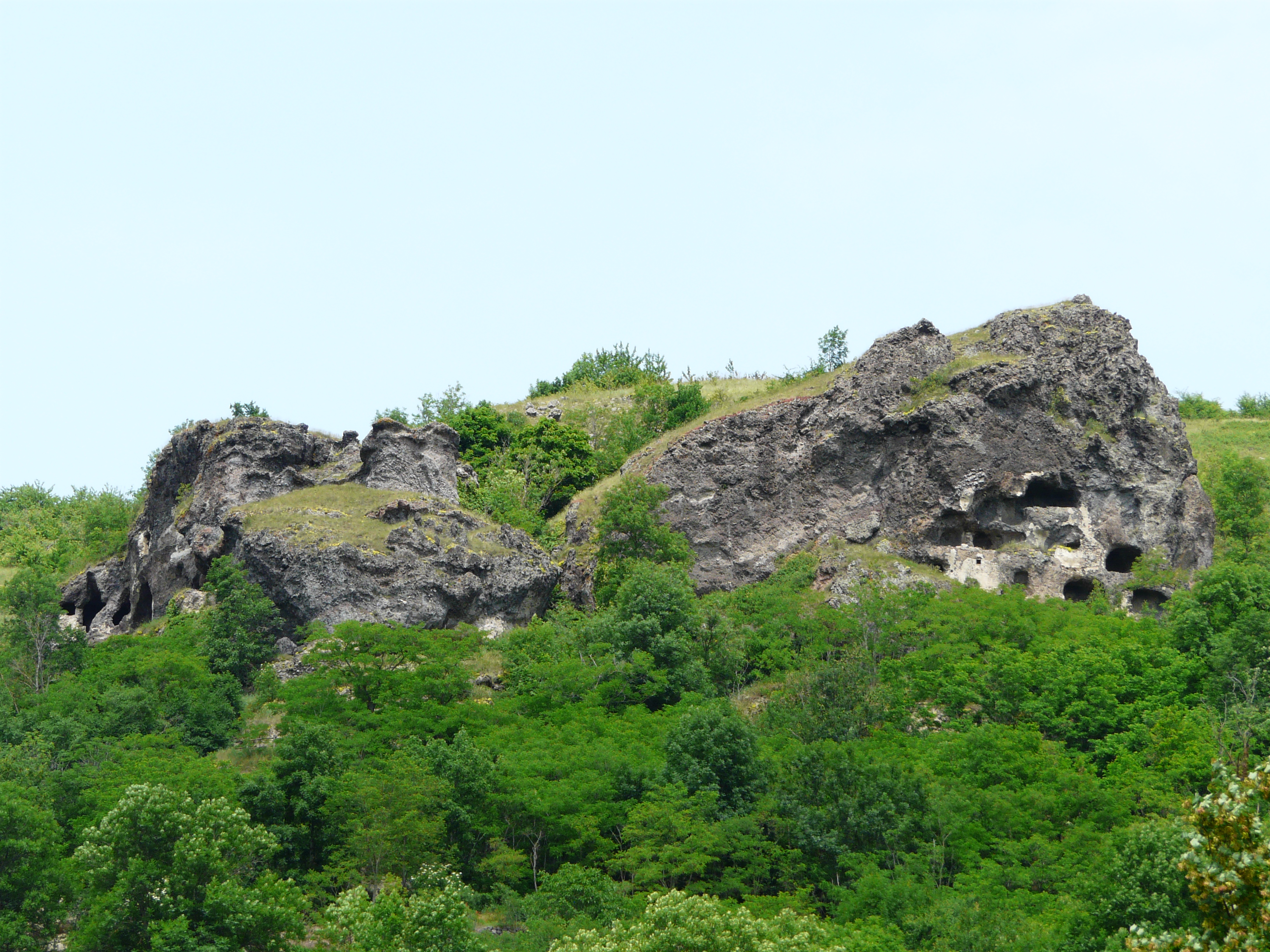
The Caves of Perrier
