= Double decker =

A double-decker is a vehicle that has two levels for passengers or cargo, one deck above the other. Such vehicles include:

- Aerial tramway
- Bilevel rail car a rail passenger vehicle consisting of 2 levels
- Bombardier BiLevel Coach
- Bombardier MultiLevel Coach
- Dome car
- Double-deck aircraft
- Double-deck elevator
- Double Decker Express premium bi-level coach trains of Indian Railways
- Double-decker bus
- Double-decker tram
- Superliner (railcar)
- Autorack (US) or car transporter (UK), a railway vehicle for transporting cars or other road vehicles
- Car carrier trailer or auto carrier, a road trailer for transporting cars or other road vehicles
- Two-decker is a sailing ship with 2 decks armed with cannon.

A double-decker may also refer to:

- Double Decker (chocolate bar)
- Double-decker sandwich, such as a club sandwich or Dagwood sandwich, with two layers of meat and condiments sandwiched between three pieces of bread
- A multi-level roadway such as those found in Chicago
- A multi-level bridge
- A double-decker outhouse
- Double Decker, a 1984 Hong Kong film
- Double Decker (2011 film), a 2011 Kannada-language film
- Double Decker! Doug & Kirill, a 2018 Japanese anime series
