= Saint-Chély =

Saint-Chély may refer to:

- Saint-Chély-d'Apcher, in the Lozère department of France
- Saint-Chély-d'Aubrac, in the Aveyron department of France
- Saint-Chély-du-Tarn, in the Lozère department of France
- Mas-Saint-Chély, in the Lozère department of France
