= Cantons of the Lozère department =

The following is a list of the 13 cantons of the Lozère department, in France, following the French canton reorganisation which came into effect in March 2015:

- Bourgs sur Colagne
- La Canourgue
- Le Collet-de-Dèze
- Florac Trois Rivières
- Grandrieu
- Langogne
- Marvejols
- Mende-1
- Mende-2
- Peyre en Aubrac
- Saint-Alban-sur-Limagnole
- Saint-Chély-d'Apcher
- Saint-Étienne-du-Valdonnez
