= Château d'Apcher =

Coordinates: 44°48′59″N 3°19′20″E

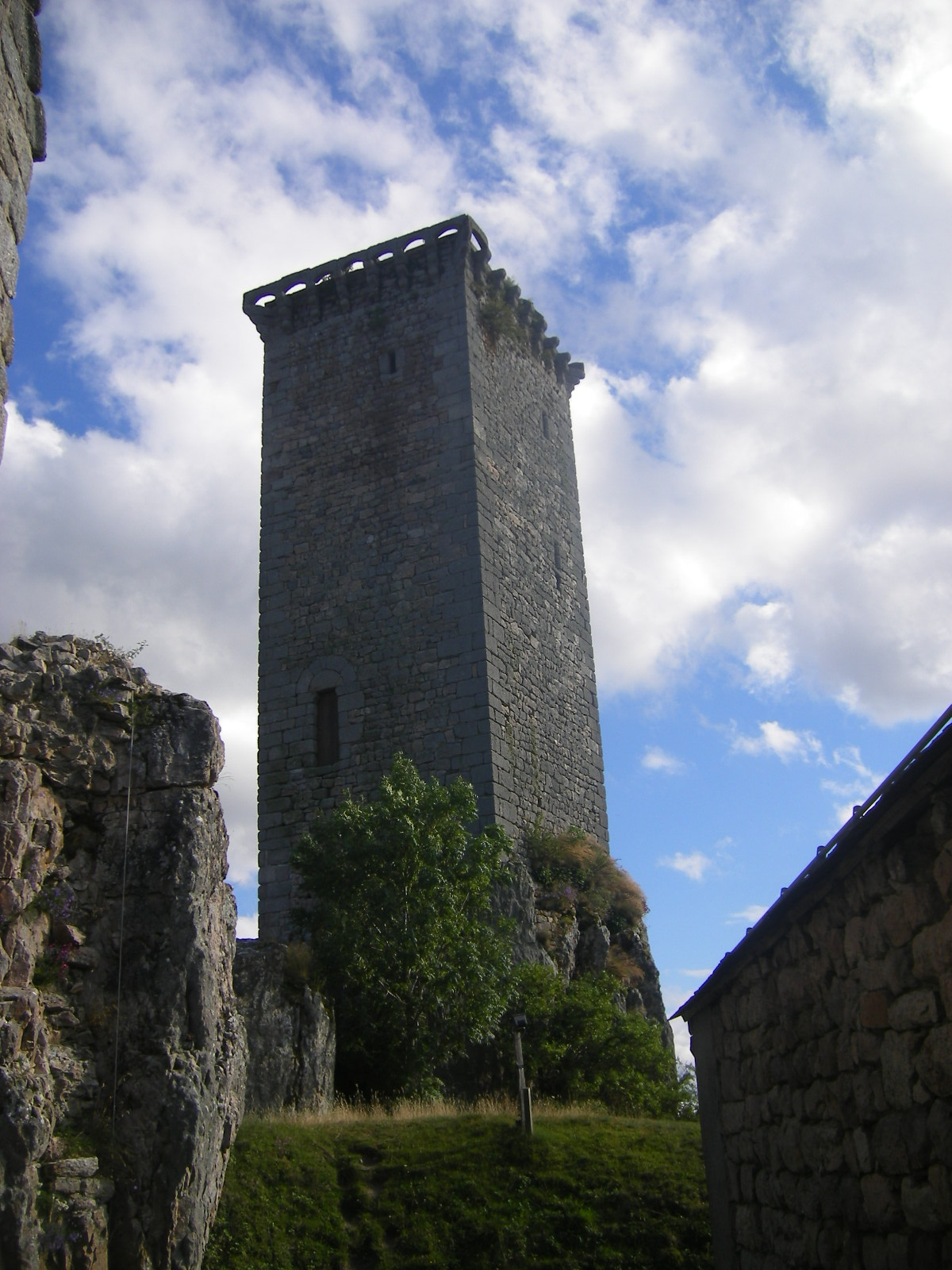
The keep

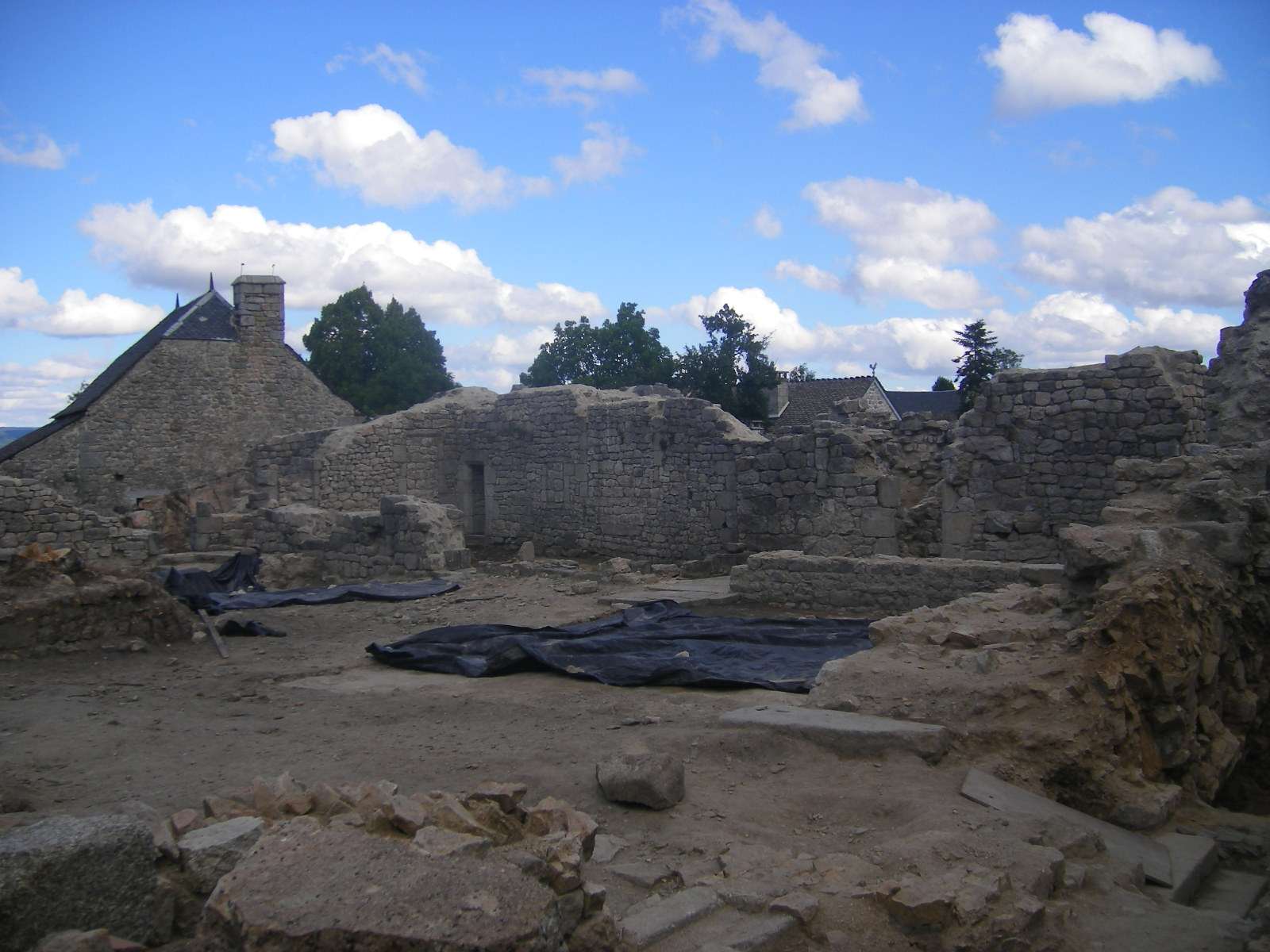
Castle ruins

The Château d'Apcher is a ruined feudal castle in the commune of Prunières in the Lozère département of France. The castle was built and altered in the 11th century, with further building in the 12th and 14th centuries.

It was the ancient seat of the Marquis d'Apchier, one of the eight barons of Gévaudan. It was abandoned bit by bit during the 17th century. Today, it is a ruin with only the keep still intact.

== Location ==
The castle is situated in the north of Gévaudan, between Saint-Chély-d'Apcher and Le Malzieu-Ville, not far from the Truyère. The baron of Apchier ruled over the whole of the northern Aubrac plain, surrounded by the baronies of Peyre and Mercœur. However, the main castle, at Apcher, was not in the centre of the barony but in its east.

== History ==
The first record of the castle is from 1180, when Garin de Châteauneuf, seigneur of Apcher and co-seigneur of Châteauneuf-Randon, paid homage to the Bishop of Mende, Aldebert III du Tournel. The son of a family from Randon, Garin had married Alix d'Apchier, the last inheritor of the first Apchier family.

The castle is the property of the commune. It has been listed since 1983 as a monument historique by the French Ministry of Culture.

== See also ==
- List of castles in France
