= Géoscope (geology) =

Monumental display of rocks in France

Coordinates: 44°52′09″N 3°14′50″E

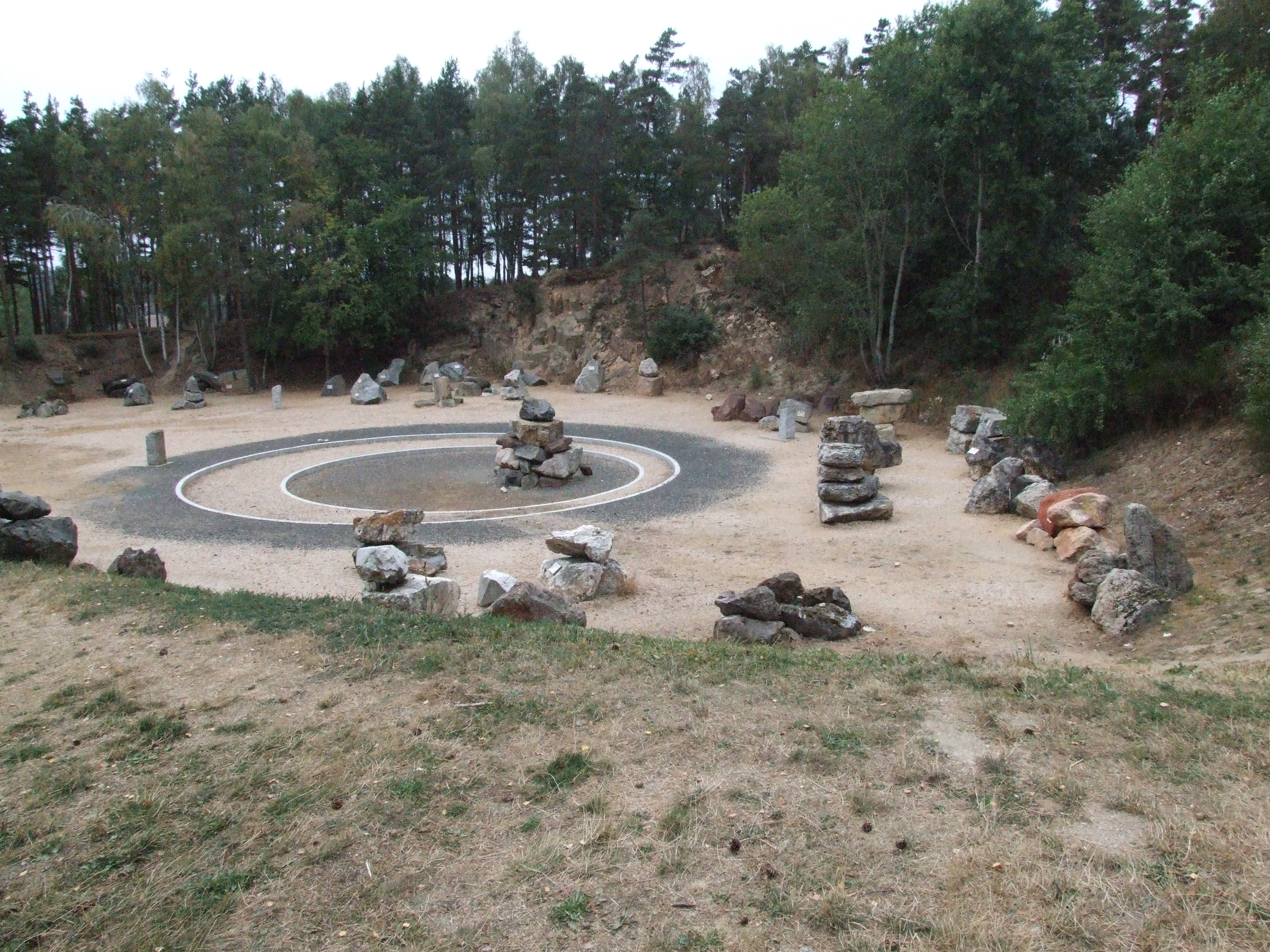

The Geoscope is a monumental display of rocks at the La Lozère motorway service at junction 32 of the A75 autoroute at Albaret-Sainte-Marie in the department of Lozère, France. It is sometimes described as a geological museum. 45 stones, each weighing many tonnes and accompanied by an interpretive panel are artistically arranged in a circle in an old quarry.

== Lozère ==
Geographically, Lozère can be divided up into 4 regions: Aubrac, Cévennes, Causses et Gorges, Margeride. The Geoscope displays rocks from each of these regions and attempts to explain their influence on the landscape.

== Access ==
Access is from the A75, the RN 106 and RN 86.
