= Saint-Pierre-le-Vieux =

Saint-Pierre-le-Vieux is the name of several communes in France:

- Saint-Pierre-le-Vieux, in the Lozère department
- Saint-Pierre-le-Vieux, in the Saône-et-Loire department
- Saint-Pierre-le-Vieux, in the Seine-Maritime department
- Saint-Pierre-le-Vieux, in the Vendée department

Saint-Pierre-le-Vieux is also the name of a church in Strasbourg, France

== See also ==
- Saint-Pierre (disambiguation)
