= Gorges du Tarn Causses =

- Commune
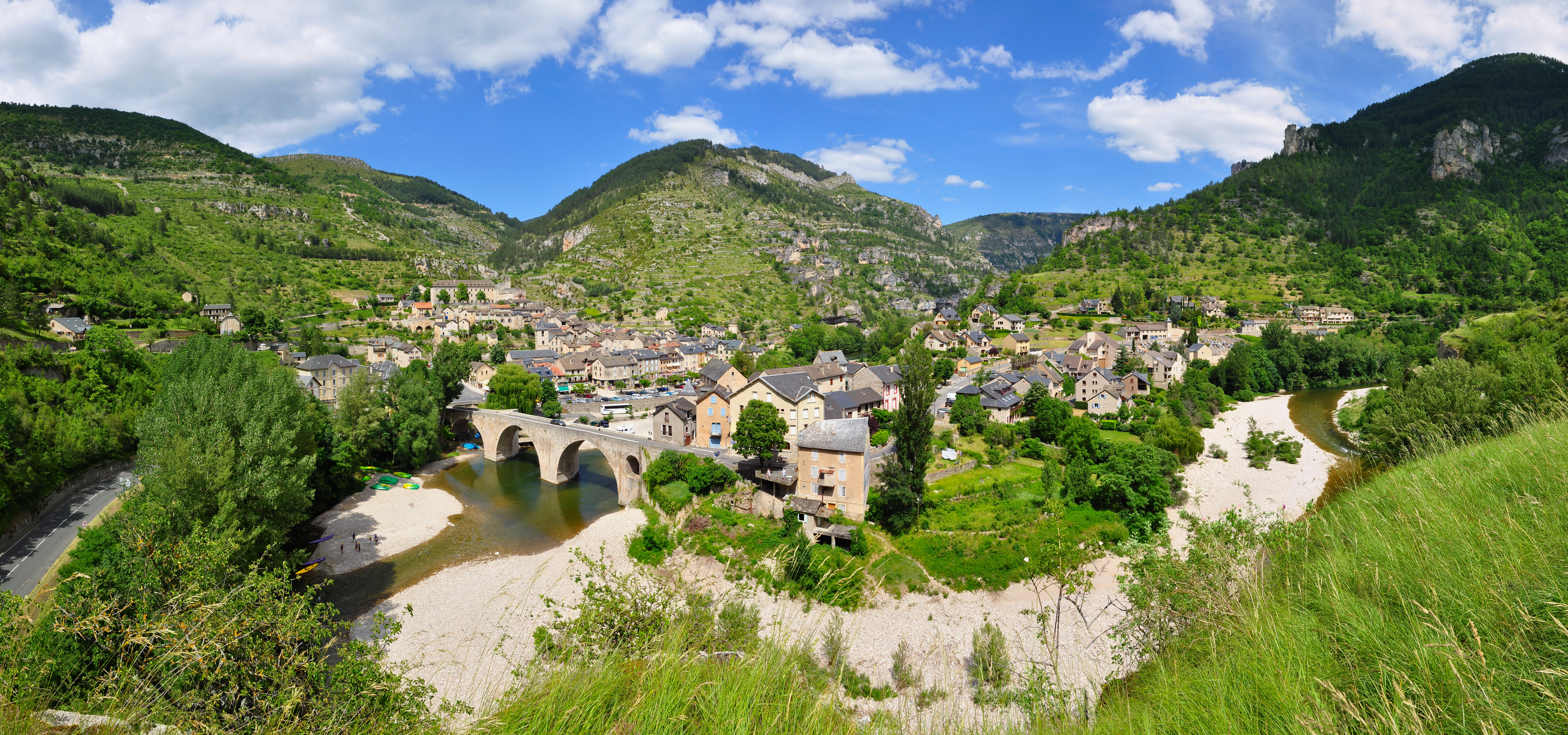
- Sainte-Enimie, the seat of Gorges du Tarn Causses, in 2009
- Location of Gorges du Tarn Causses
- Location within France Location within Occitanie
- Coordinates: 44°22′05″N 3°24′43″E
- Country: France
- Region: Occitania
- Department: Lozère
- Arrondissement: Florac
- Canton: Florac Trois Rivières
- Intercommunality: Gorges Causses Cévennes

Government
  - Mayor (2020–2026): Alain Chmiel
- Area^{1}: 144.22 km^{2} (55.68 sq mi)
- Population (2023): 881
  - Density: 6.11/km^{2} (15.8/sq mi)
- Time zone: UTC+01:00 (CET)
  - Summer (DST): UTC+02:00 (CEST)
- INSEE/Postal code: 48146 /48210, 48320
- ^{1} French Land Register data, which excludes lakes, ponds, glaciers > 1 km^{2} (0.386 sq mi or 247 acres) and river estuaries.

Gorges du Tarn Causses (French pronunciation: [ɡɔʁʒ dy taʁn kos]; Occitan: Gorgs dels Tarn Causses) is a commune in the department of Lozère, southern France. The municipality was established on 1 January 2017 by merger of the former communes of Sainte-Enimie (the seat), Montbrun and Quézac.

== See also ==
- Communes of the Lozère department
