= Montbrun =

Montbrun is the name or part of the name of the following communes in France:

- Montbrun, Lot, in the Lot department
- Montbrun, Lozère, in the Lozère department
- Montbrun-Bocage, in the Haute-Garonne department
- Montbrun-des-Corbières, in the Aude department
- Montbrun-Lauragais, in the Haute-Garonne department
- Montbrun-les-Bains, in the Drôme department
- Saint-Léger-de-Montbrun, in the Deux-Sèvres department

== See also ==
- Louis-Pierre Montbrun
