= Rimeize =

- Commune
- Coat of arms
- Location of Rimeize
- Location within France Location within Occitanie
- Coordinates: 44°45′57″N 3°19′28″E
- Country: France
- Region: Occitania
- Department: Lozère
- Arrondissement: Mende
- Canton: Saint-Chély-d'Apcher

Government
  - Mayor (2021–2026): Thomas Pignide
- Area^{1}: 32.30 km^{2} (12.47 sq mi)
- Elevation: 930 m (3,050 ft)
- Highest elevation: 1,125 m (3,691 ft)
- Lowest elevation: 890 m (2,920 ft)
- Population (2023): 623
  - Density: 19.3/km^{2} (50.0/sq mi)
- Time zone: UTC+01:00 (CET)
  - Summer (DST): UTC+02:00 (CEST)
- INSEE/Postal code: 48128 /48200
- ^{1} French Land Register data, which excludes lakes, ponds, glaciers > 1 km^{2} (0.386 sq mi or 247 acres) and river estuaries.

Rimeize (French pronunciation: [ʁimɛz]; Occitan: Rimèsa) is a commune in the Lozère department in southern France.

== See also ==
- Communes of the Lozère department
