= Sainte-Enimie =

- Part of Gorges du Tarn Causses
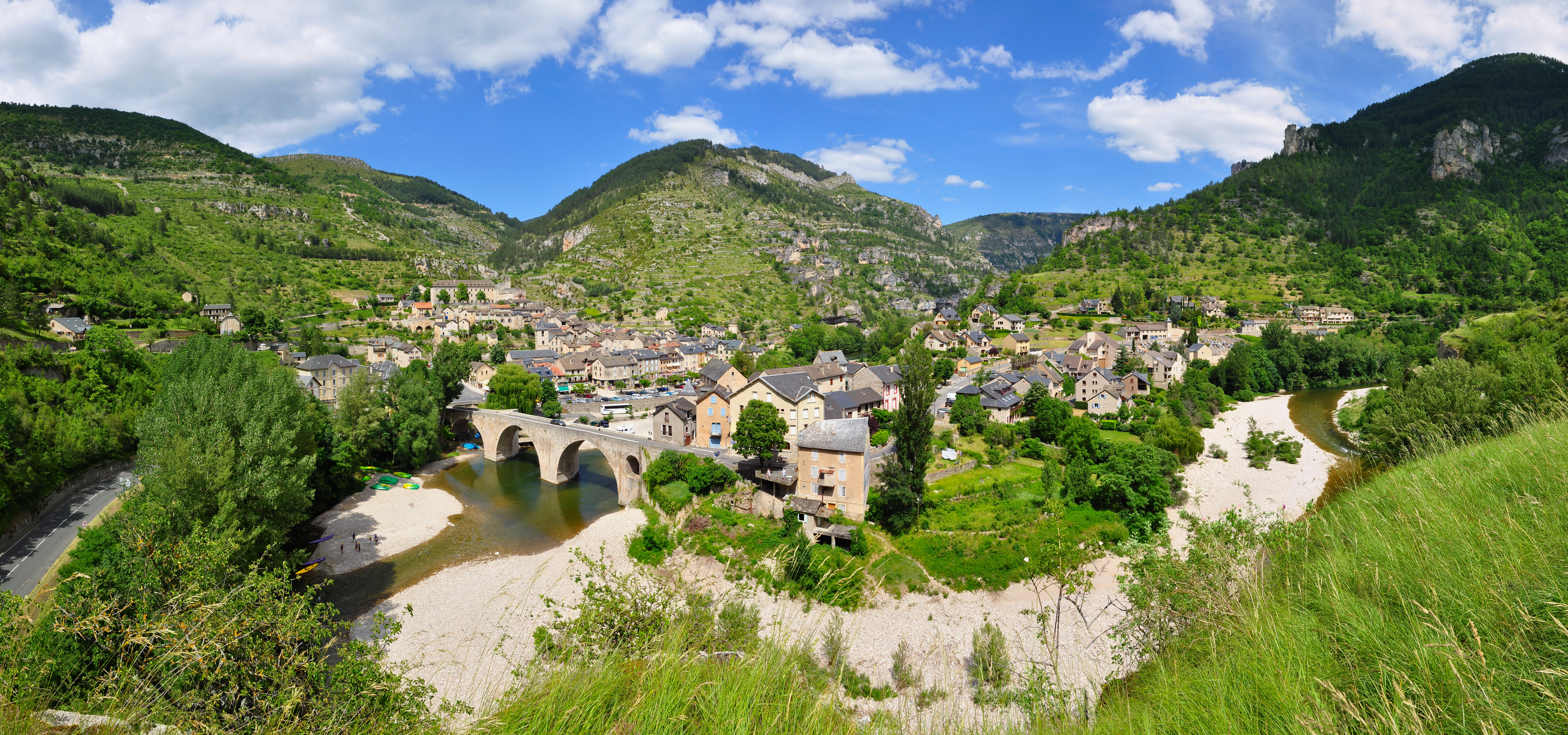
- Sainte-Enimie in 2009

- Coat of arms
- Location of Sainte-Enimie
- Location within France Location within Occitanie
- Coordinates: 44°22′03″N 3°24′43″E
- Country: France
- Region: Occitania
- Department: Lozère
- Arrondissement: Florac
- Canton: La Canourgue
- Commune: Gorges du Tarn Causses
- Area^{1}: 87.34 km^{2} (33.72 sq mi)
- Elevation: 480 m (1,570 ft)
- Highest elevation: 1,096 m (3,596 ft)
- Lowest elevation: 444 m (1,457 ft)
- Population (2022): 500
  - Density: 5.7/km^{2} (15/sq mi)
- Time zone: UTC+01:00 (CET)
  - Summer (DST): UTC+02:00 (CEST)
- Postal code: 48210
- ^{1} French Land Register data, which excludes lakes, ponds, glaciers > 1 km^{2} (0.386 sq mi or 247 acres) and river estuaries.

Sainte-Enimie (French pronunciation: [sɛ̃t enimi]; Occitan: Santa Enimia) is a former commune in the Lozère department in southern France. On 1 January 2017, it was merged into the new commune Gorges du Tarn Causses. It was founded in the 7th century by Énimie, who started a convent there after being cured of leprosy in the surrounding waters. It was the site of several monasteries, some of which still remain. Located in the Gorges du Tarn, it is a member of Les Plus Beaux Villages de France association.

== History ==
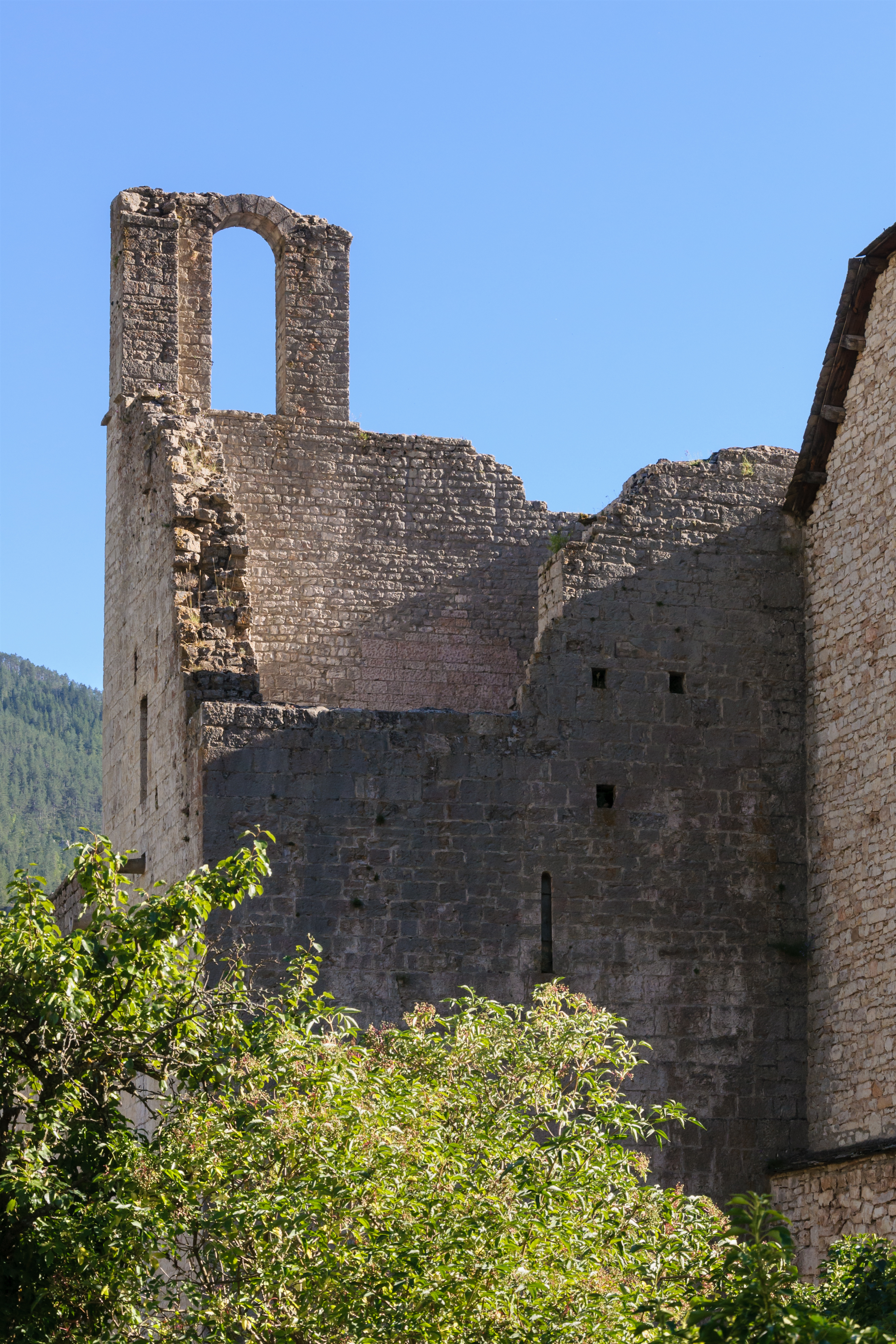
The remains of the monastery in Sainte-Enimie

The town is named after Énimie, who, according to a 13th-century poem by Bertran Carbonel troubadour of Marseille, was a daughter of the Merovingian king Clothar II. When she reached marriageable age, she did not want to marry, preferring to care for lepers instead. According to Bertran, she asked God to help her avoid marriage; she was then infected with leprosy. Her father wished for her to be cured and had her taken to be bathed in the waters of Gévaudan, to no avail. An attempt at Bagnols-les-Bains was equally unsuccessful, but a river in Burlats near the Tarn miraculously cured her disease. However, when she returned home to marry her noble suitor, she was once again infected with leprosy and returned to Burlats, where she was cured once more. This process was repeated a third time, after which it was decided that she must remain in that area. She briefly lived in a cave before starting a convent and becoming a nun and eventually died there. When her brother Dagobert I came to look for relics buried with her to decorate his Basilica of Saint-Denis, the nuns tricked him, and he ended up finding the relics of Énimie's niece instead.

Two monasteries, one male and one female, were built in the area but destroyed by invasions. Stephen, Bishop of Mende, requested that a Benedictine monastery be built there, and it was completed in 951. It became a popular pilgrimage destination due to the miraculous story surrounding its founding.

During the French Revolution in 1798, the monastery was destroyed and the town renamed "Puy Roc"; however, this lasted only a short time.

In 1905, a road was built along the Tarn, giving the village greater commercial exposure. Starting in the 1950s, tourism became a major part of Sainte-Enimie's economy. It was recently connected more closely to the rest of France with the construction of the A75 autoroute.

== Geography ==
Sainte-Enimie is located in the Gorges du Tarn in the Lozère department of southern France. It has an area of 87.34 square kilometres (33.72 sq mi). The village is close to other Gévaudan towns including Ispagnac, Chanac, and Quézac, and is 78 kilometres (48 mi) away from Millau.

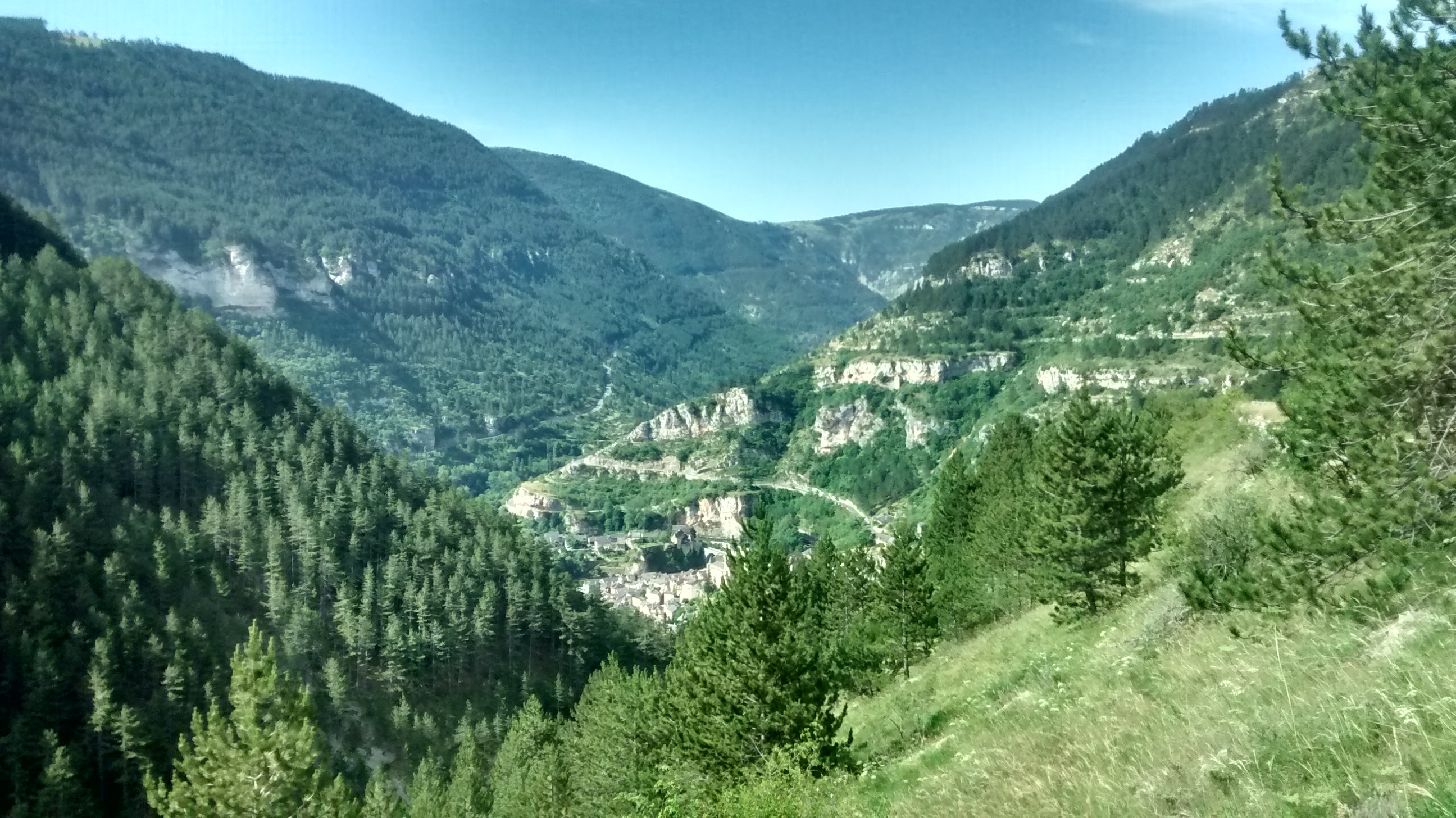
Location of Sainte-Enimie in the Gorges du Tarn, from a footpath leading down the valley from the north east.

== Villages ==
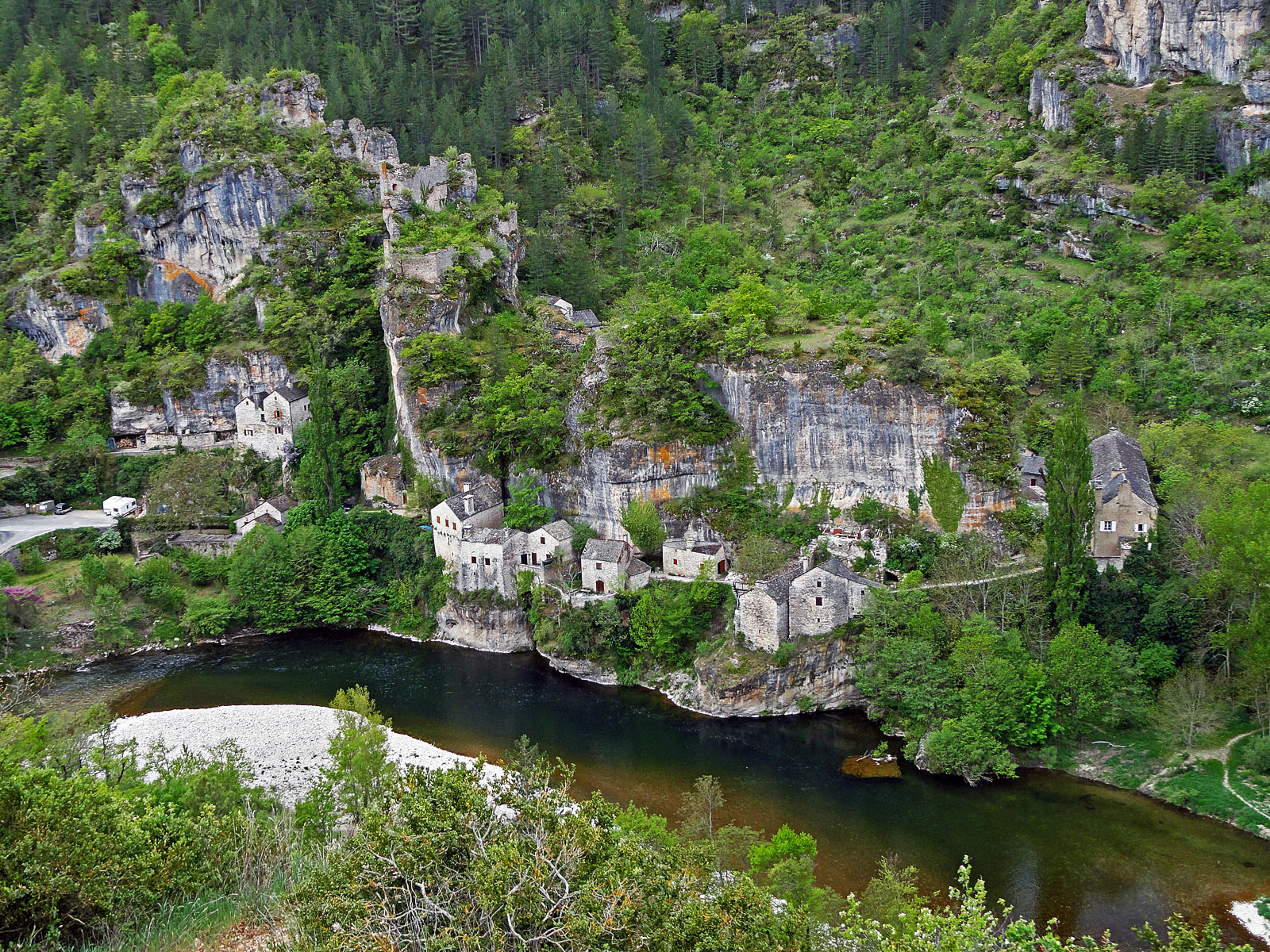
Castelbouc the river of Tarn

In addition to the village of Sainte-Enimie, several other villages are located on the territory of the commune. They include:

- Boisset
- Castelbouc
- Champerboux
- Hauterives
- Pougnadoires
- Prades
- Saint-Chély-du-Tarn

== Landmarks ==
Sainte-Enimie is a popular tourist destination. All that remains of the original 10th-century abbey, which was mostly destroyed in the French Revolution, is a chapter house and chapel. Other popular sites include the Ecomusée du Vieux Logis, a Romanesque church from the 14th century, and the Chapel of Saint Madeleine, which also dates back to the 14th century. Saint-Enimie is located near the Cévennes National Park, 22 kilometres (14 mi) away from the Aven Armand cave.

== Population ==
Historical population
Year	Pop.	±% p.a.
1962	512	—
1968	436	−2.64%
1975	564	+3.75%
1982	491	−1.96%
1990	473	−0.47%
1999	509	+0.82%
2007	523	+0.34%
2012	522	−0.04%
2022	500	−0.43%
Source: EHESS and INSEE (2007-2019)

== See also ==
- Communes of the Lozère department
