= Departmental Council of Lozère =

Departmental legislature in France

The Departmental Council of Lozère (French: Conseil départemental de la Lozère, Occitan: Conselh departamental de Losera) is the deliberative assembly of the department of Lozère in the region of Occitanie. It consists of 26 members (general councilors) from 13 cantons and its headquarters are in Mende.

The President of the General Council is Sophie Pantel.

== Vice-Presidents ==
The President of the Departmental Council is assisted by 7 vice-presidents chosen from among the departmental advisers. Each of them has a delegation of authority.

List of vice-presidents of the council (as of 2021)
| Order | Departmental advisor | Party | Canton (constituency) |
|---|---|---|---|
| 1st | Laurent Suau | DVG | Mende-1 |
| 2nd | Patricia Brémond | DVG | Marvejols |
| 3rd | Robert Aigoin | DVG | Le Collet-de-Dèze |
| 4th | Johanne Trioulier | DVG | Langogne |
| 5th | Rémi André | DVG | Bourgs sur Colagne |
| 6th | Françoise Amarger-Brajon | PS | Mende-2 |
| 7th | Denis Bertrand | PS | Florac Trois Rivières |

== See also ==
- Lozère
- General councils of France
