= Saint-Chély-d'Apcher =

- Commune
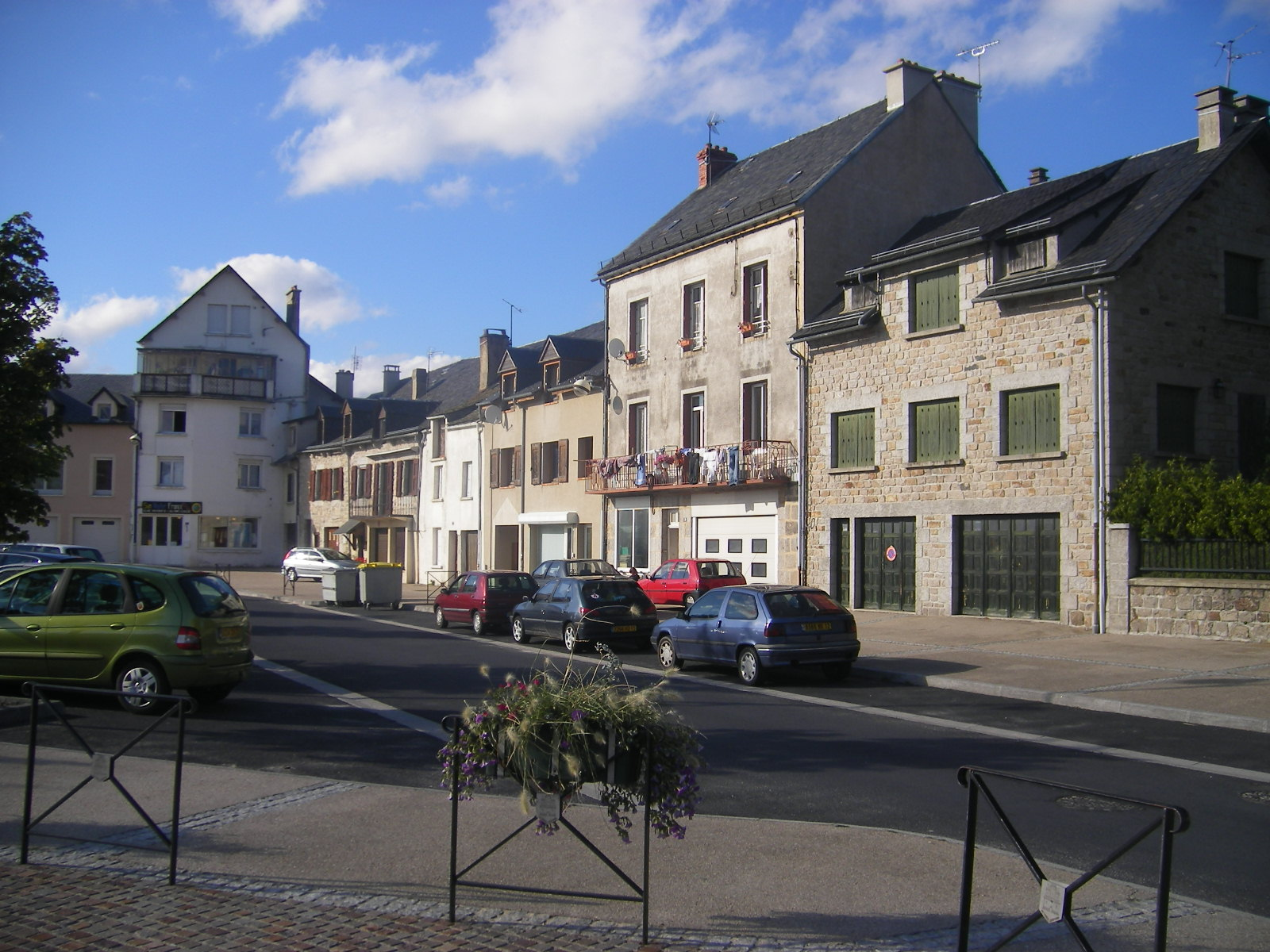
- A view in the centre of the village

- Coat of arms
- Location of Saint-Chély-d'Apcher
- Location within France Location within Occitanie
- Coordinates: 44°48′14″N 3°16′34″E
- Country: France
- Region: Occitania
- Department: Lozère
- Arrondissement: Mende
- Canton: Saint-Chély-d'Apcher

Government
  - Mayor (2020–2026): Christine Hugon
- Area^{1}: 28.26 km^{2} (10.91 sq mi)
- Elevation: 993 m (3,258 ft)
- Highest elevation: 1,126 m (3,694 ft)
- Lowest elevation: 935 m (3,068 ft)
- Population (2023): 3,955
  - Density: 140.0/km^{2} (362.5/sq mi)
- Time zone: UTC+01:00 (CET)
  - Summer (DST): UTC+02:00 (CEST)
- INSEE/Postal code: 48140 /48200
- ^{1} French Land Register data, which excludes lakes, ponds, glaciers > 1 km^{2} (0.386 sq mi or 247 acres) and river estuaries.

Saint-Chély-d'Apcher (French pronunciation: [sɛ̃ ʃeli dapʃe]; Occitan: Sanch Ale dels Apchièrs) is a commune in the Lozère department in southern France.

== History ==
Its inhabitants are called Barrabans. This name was allotted to the inhabitants of Saint-Chély-d'Apcher during the Hundred Years' War. In 1363, the town was attacked by the English. The inhabitants defended themselves with bars, and advanced towards the attacking English army to the cry of "barres en avant" ("bars ahead").

=== Coat of arms ===
The shield of Saint-Chély-d'Apcher is a red castle with two blue axes and the background is golden. The axes can be a product of the legend of the eight Gévaudan's baronage.

=== Apcher Castle ===
Château d'Apcher is a feudal castle. It is situated in the village Prunières, 3 km from Saint Chély. Now, it is a ruin, the donjon and chapel are still intact.

=== Gévaudan Beast ===
The Gévaudan Beast is an animal at the origin of many attacks against women and children between 1764 and 1767. It looked like a wolf or a werewolf. The beast is a legend but many people were actually killed.

== Geography ==
Saint-Chély-d'Apcher is located at the centre of the Gévaudan area, between Aubrac and Margeride. It's in the North of Lozère. St Chély-d'Apcher is 935 meters high and it is 28.26 km^{2}. There are 4,455 inhabitants in 2016. The climate is temperate. In summer it is warm, the temperatures can vary from 12 to 30 degrees Celsius. In winter it can be very cold, it can be freezing. It can snow a lot.

=== Transport ===
The A75 motorway (Clermont-Ferrand–Béziers passes east of the town. It replaced the old Route nationale 9, which was reclassified as RD 809 and passes the town. The RD 806 (former Route nationale 106) connects Saint-Chély-d'Apcher with Mende. The Saint-Chély-d'Apcher station is served by local and Intercités trains between Clermont-Ferrand and Béziers.

== Population ==
Historical population
Year	Pop.	±% p.a.
1968	5,016	—
1975	4,624	−1.16%
1982	4,726	+0.31%
1990	4,570	−0.42%
1999	4,316	−0.63%
2007	4,468	+0.43%
2012	4,187	−1.29%
2017	4,164	−0.11%
2023	3,955	−0.85%
Source: INSEE

== Culture ==
There is an art festival: Saint Chely d'Arte. It takes place during the second week-end of August. There are music, theater and exhibitions.

The cinema was renovated in 2014 to welcome both movies and plays. There are 144 seats. The library is in the village square.

The cultural centre was created in 1981. There are art exhibitions made by professional and hobbyist artists.

Radio Zema is a local radio station, created in July 1981. It is animated by employees and volunteers.

== Economy ==
=== Industry ===
The town has a long-standing iron foundry, owned by the ArcelorMittal group. It comprises production lines for rolling, annealing and scouring, and it also manufactures steel.

The Arcelor Mittal factory of Saint chely was created in 1916. It produces 100,000 tonnes of steel per year and it is the European leader in top of the range products. The customers are from the European Union. The factory invested almost €750,000 annually to preserve the environment. The factory is famous on a European scale. It is the only factory of Arcelor Mittal in Europe that produces pieces of sheet metal, more precisely non-oriented electrical steels.

=== Fire Station ===
The fire station of Saint-Chély-d'Apcher was inaugurated on July 21, 2010. There are approximately 46 firefighters. There are fire engines, a ladder truck, tankers, rescue trucks and two bikes. In 2014, the firefighters realized more than 548 interventions.

=== Sports ===
There are 2 gymnasiums where there is climbing, body building, basketball, football and handball.

There are a lot of sports clubs. Dance, tennis and badminton for example.

The swimming pool is called Atlantie. There, people can do many activities. There is an island for children. There are also a slide, a sauna and a Jacuzzi. There is a competition pool. There you can practise sporty swimming, synchronized swimming, swimming with fins and scuba-diving.

== Monuments and tourist areas ==
Saint-Chély-d'Apcher has a bell tower without a church and a church without a bell tower.

The bell tower of the town is also the old town keep.

=== Museums ===
- Le musée des papillons (Museum of butterflies) contains more than 2700 species of butterfly. But at the moment, the museum of butterflies is closed.
- Le musée de la métallurgie (Metalworking Industry Museum) was created in 1990, by workers of the factory. It shows the life of these men at work and the story and evolution of the factory.

=== Camping ===
The town campsite is called "La Croix des Anglais". It is 2 hectares. It's close to the town centre and to the countryside. We can sleep in a tent, in a caravan, or in the open. It is situated between Margeride mountains and Aubrac.

=== Outdoor Activities ===
Hiking, horse riding, biking, hunting, fishing, skiing...

=== Others ===
Saint-Chély-d'Apcher is a popular area for ornithologists, due to wide variety of both rural- and urban-dwelling birds that can be seen. Local dancing involves cartwheels, stamping and clapping, whilst men wear smocks and women wear traditional layered dresses.

== Education ==
=== Middle schools ===
There are 2 middle schools in Saint-Chély-d'Apcher. The Haut Gevaudan school (built in 1962) and the Sacre coeur school (built in 1959). This year (2016) there are around 300 students in the Haut Gévaudan school.

=== High schools ===
There are four high schools in Saint-Chély-d'Apcher: -> Théophile Roussel high school -> Sacré Coeur general high school -> Sacré Coeur professional high school (industry and cooking fields) -> Rabelais professional high school (nature and environnement fields) There are about 2,600 students in Saint-Chély-d'Apcher.

=== Higher education and research ===
Saint-Chély-d'Apcher has a college where it is possible to take a course in BTSA management and nature conservation. The college also proposes to offer a course in electronic and mechanical design and manufacture.

== Twin towns ==
- The town is twinned with Tadcaster in England.

== Climate ==
Climate data for Saint-Chély-d'Apcher, elevation 1,032 m (3,386 ft), (1988–2010 normals, extremes 1988–2020)
Month	Jan	Feb	Mar	Apr	May	Jun	Jul	Aug	Sep	Oct	Nov	Dec	Year
Record high °C (°F)	17.0 (62.6)	21.5 (70.7)	22.2 (72.0)	24.5 (76.1)	28.2 (82.8)	36.5 (97.7)	35.7 (96.3)	36.5 (97.7)	31.0 (87.8)	25.5 (77.9)	21.7 (71.1)	16.9 (62.4)	36.5 (97.7)
Mean daily maximum °C (°F)	4.7 (40.5)	5.9 (42.6)	9.4 (48.9)	11.4 (52.5)	16.6 (61.9)	20.6 (69.1)	23.9 (75.0)	23.9 (75.0)	18.6 (65.5)	13.9 (57.0)	7.9 (46.2)	4.8 (40.6)	13.5 (56.3)
Daily mean °C (°F)	0.4 (32.7)	1.1 (34.0)	3.9 (39.0)	5.9 (42.6)	10.4 (50.7)	13.8 (56.8)	16.4 (61.5)	16.3 (61.3)	12.1 (53.8)	8.8 (47.8)	3.7 (38.7)	0.8 (33.4)	7.8 (46.0)
Mean daily minimum °C (°F)	−3.9 (25.0)	−3.7 (25.3)	−1.5 (29.3)	0.4 (32.7)	4.2 (39.6)	7.1 (44.8)	8.9 (48.0)	8.7 (47.7)	5.5 (41.9)	3.8 (38.8)	−0.5 (31.1)	−3.2 (26.2)	2.2 (36.0)
Record low °C (°F)	−18.2 (−0.8)	−21.5 (−6.7)	−25.6 (−14.1)	−10.2 (13.6)	−5.6 (21.9)	−2.0 (28.4)	1.2 (34.2)	−1.3 (29.7)	−4.6 (23.7)	−11.0 (12.2)	−15.9 (3.4)	−21.5 (−6.7)	−25.6 (−14.1)
Average precipitation mm (inches)	53.6 (2.11)	46.4 (1.83)	42.7 (1.68)	80.4 (3.17)	80.3 (3.16)	72.2 (2.84)	53.0 (2.09)	72.2 (2.84)	91.8 (3.61)	93.2 (3.67)	72.9 (2.87)	62.7 (2.47)	821.4 (32.34)
Average precipitation days (≥ 1.0 mm)	9.7	8.9	8.0	10.8	11.4	8.4	6.5	8.0	8.6	10.8	11.0	9.7	111.9
Source: Meteociel

== See also ==
- Communes of the Lozère department
- The works of Maxime Real del Sarte
