= Gorges du Tarn =

Canyon in southern France

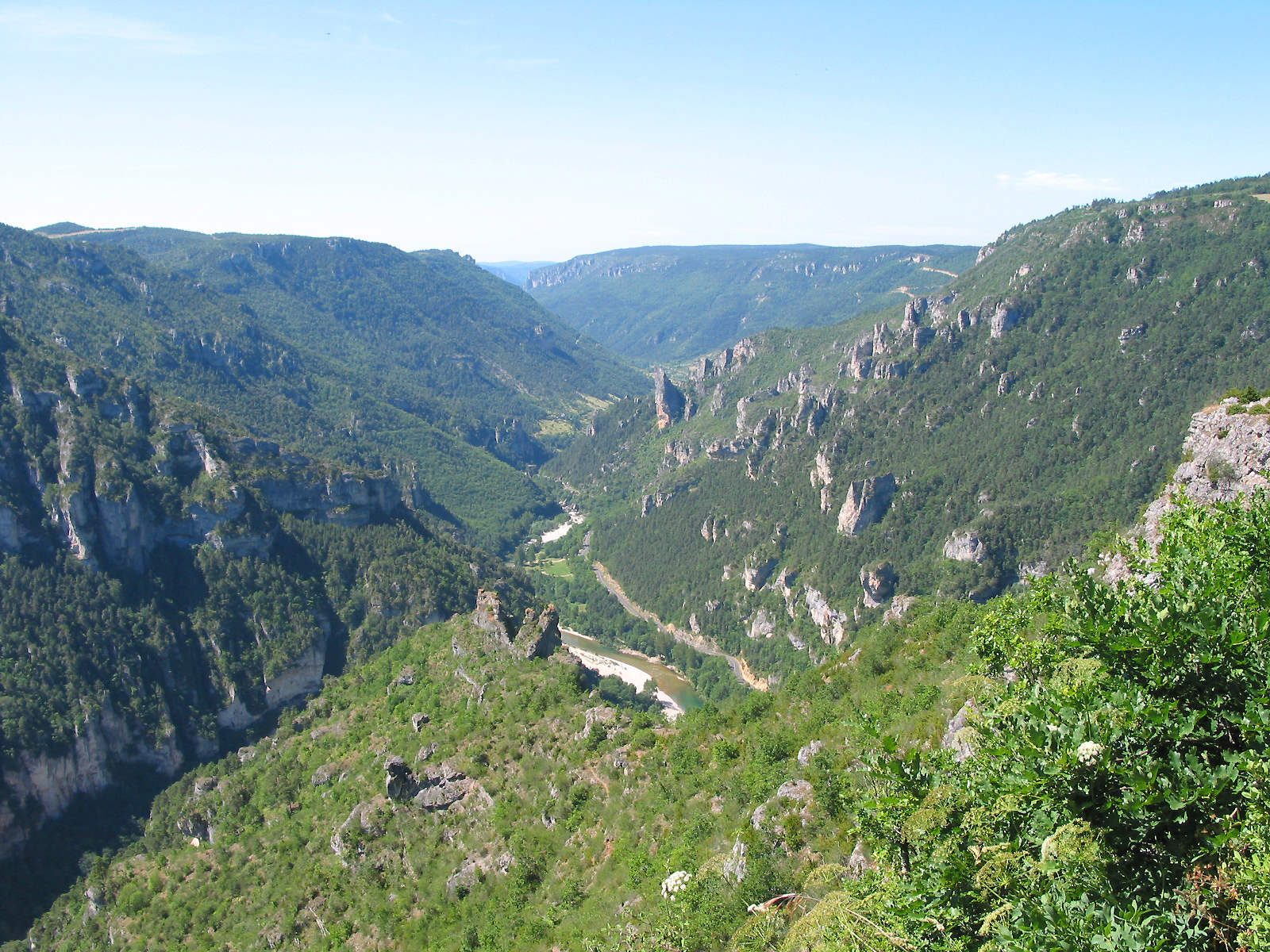
The Gorges du Tarn.

The Gorges du Tarn (Occitan: Gòrjas de Tarn) is a canyon formed by the Tarn (river) between the Causse Méjean and the Causse de Sauveterre, in southern France. The canyon, mainly located in the Lozère département, and partially in the Aveyron département, is about 53 kilometres (33 mi)-long (from the village of Quézac to Le Rozier, from 44°22′30″N 3°31′15″E to 44°11′36″N 3°12′20″E) and 400 m to 600 m deep. It is the longest canyon in Europe.

== Geography and geology ==
The gorges landscape involves Mesozoic limestone plateaux downstream presenting sub-vertical cliffs. Faults like the Hauterive Fault explain the important water sources in the region of Sainte-Enimie (the Burle source and the Coussac source, the latter joining the Tarn in an impressive waterfall), and the more complex geology in the upstream part of the canyon.

In the Quaternary, the gorges were also affected by volcanic activity whose traces can be found in the Causse de Sauveterre, in the form of a double or anticlinal volcanic dip, and in the basaltic rocks next to Eglazines.

The climate is Mediterranean, with very warm summers and relatively mild winters.

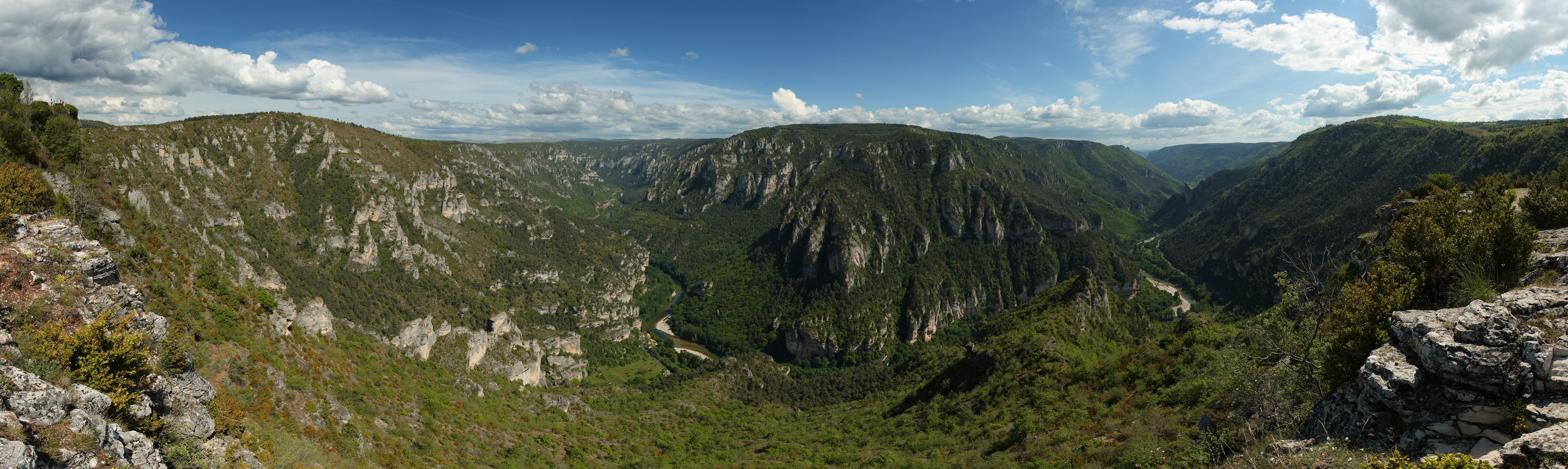
Gorges du Tarn, seen from the Point Sublime

== Wildlife ==
The gorge is inhabited by 3,000 vultures. Nightingales, owls, red-billed choughs, and cuckoos also live here.

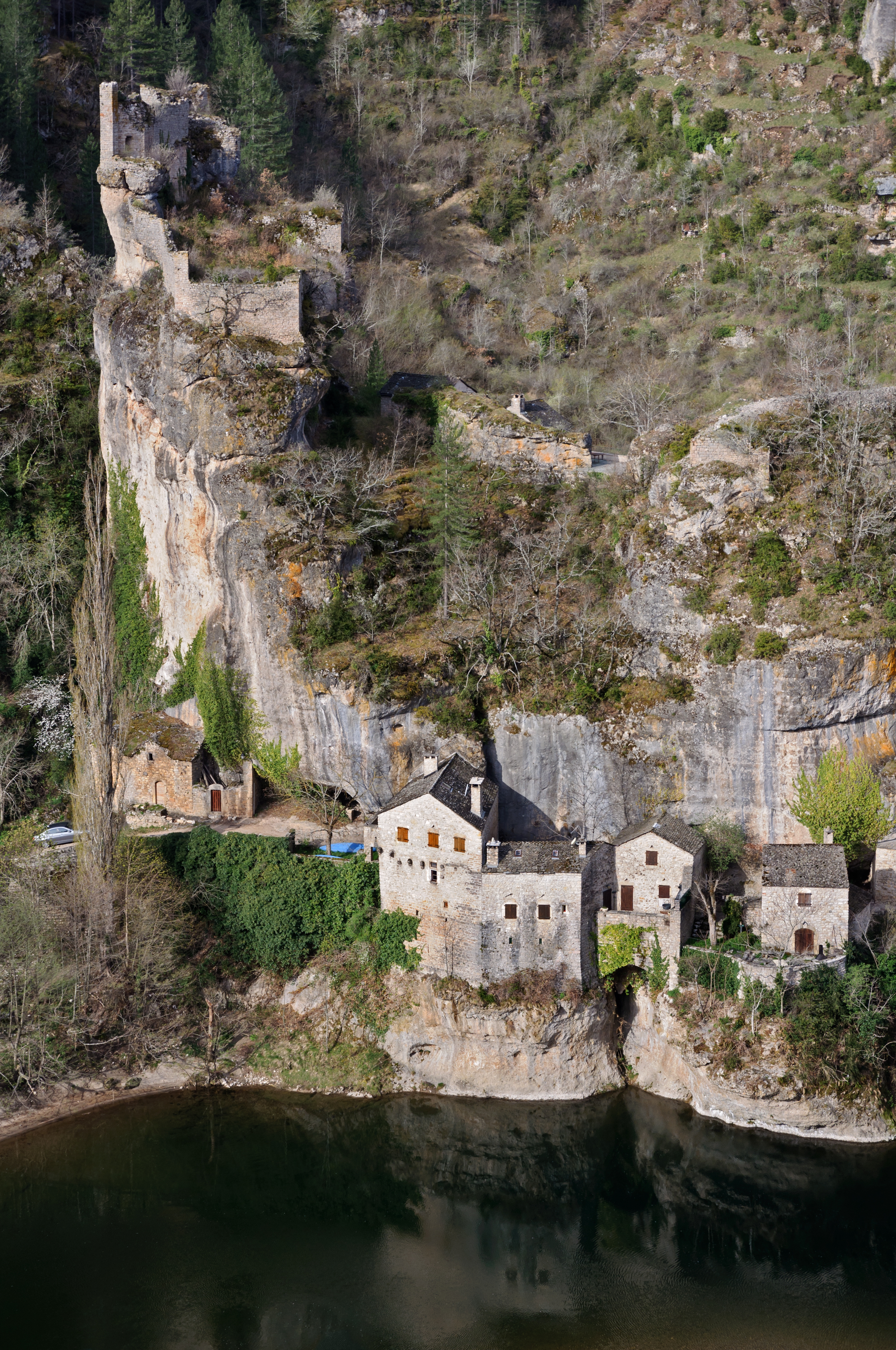
Castelbouc, overlooked by its ruined castle.

== Tourism ==
Tourism is a main factor of development in the region, with the earliest tourist walks dating back to 1875 after the completion of the Paris-Beziers railway. The completion of the Tarn Gorges road in 1905 increased canyon accessibility. Tourism activities in the gorge include:

- Hiking. The GR736 hiking route, opened in 2023, crosses this gorge.
- Kayaking
- Caving in the Causses
- Visiting typical villages such as Cirque de Saint-Chély-du-Tarn
- Rock climbing
- Outdoor sports and leisure activities

== Architecture ==
Many castles have been built along the Gorges, most of them dating back to the Middle Ages, such as those of Castelbouc, Lacaze, Hauterives, La Malène or Saint-Rome-de-Dolan.

== See also ==
- Tourism in Tarn
