= Saint-Pierre-le-Vieux, Lozère =

Saint-Pierre-le-Vieux
- Commune
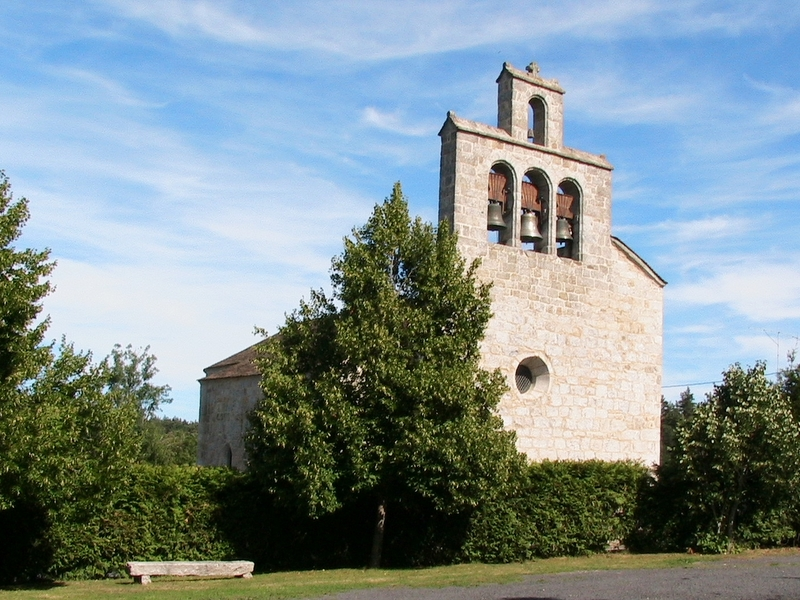
- Church of Vareilles, in Saint-Pierre-le-Vieux
- Location of Saint-Pierre-le-Vieux
- Location within France Location within Occitanie
- Coordinates: 44°50′53″N 3°18′33″E
- Country: France
- Region: Occitania
- Department: Lozère
- Arrondissement: Mende
- Canton: Saint-Chély-d'Apcher
- Intercommunality: Terres d'Apcher-Margeride-Aubrac

Government
  - Mayor (2020–2026): Joel Rouquet
- Area^{1}: 15.55 km^{2} (6.00 sq mi)
- Elevation: 950 m (3,120 ft)
- Highest elevation: 1,090 m (3,580 ft)
- Lowest elevation: 840 m (2,760 ft)
- Population (2023): 308
  - Density: 19.8/km^{2} (51.3/sq mi)
- Time zone: UTC+01:00 (CET)
  - Summer (DST): UTC+02:00 (CEST)
- INSEE/Postal code: 48177 /48200
- ^{1} French Land Register data, which excludes lakes, ponds, glaciers > 1 km^{2} (0.386 sq mi or 247 acres) and river estuaries.

Saint-Pierre-le-Vieux (French pronunciation: [sɛ̃ pjɛʁ lə vjø]; Occitan: Sent Pèire lo Vièlh) is a commune in the Lozère department in southern France.

== See also ==
- Communes of the Lozère department
