= Montbrun, Lozère =

Montbrun
- Part of Gorges du Tarn Causses
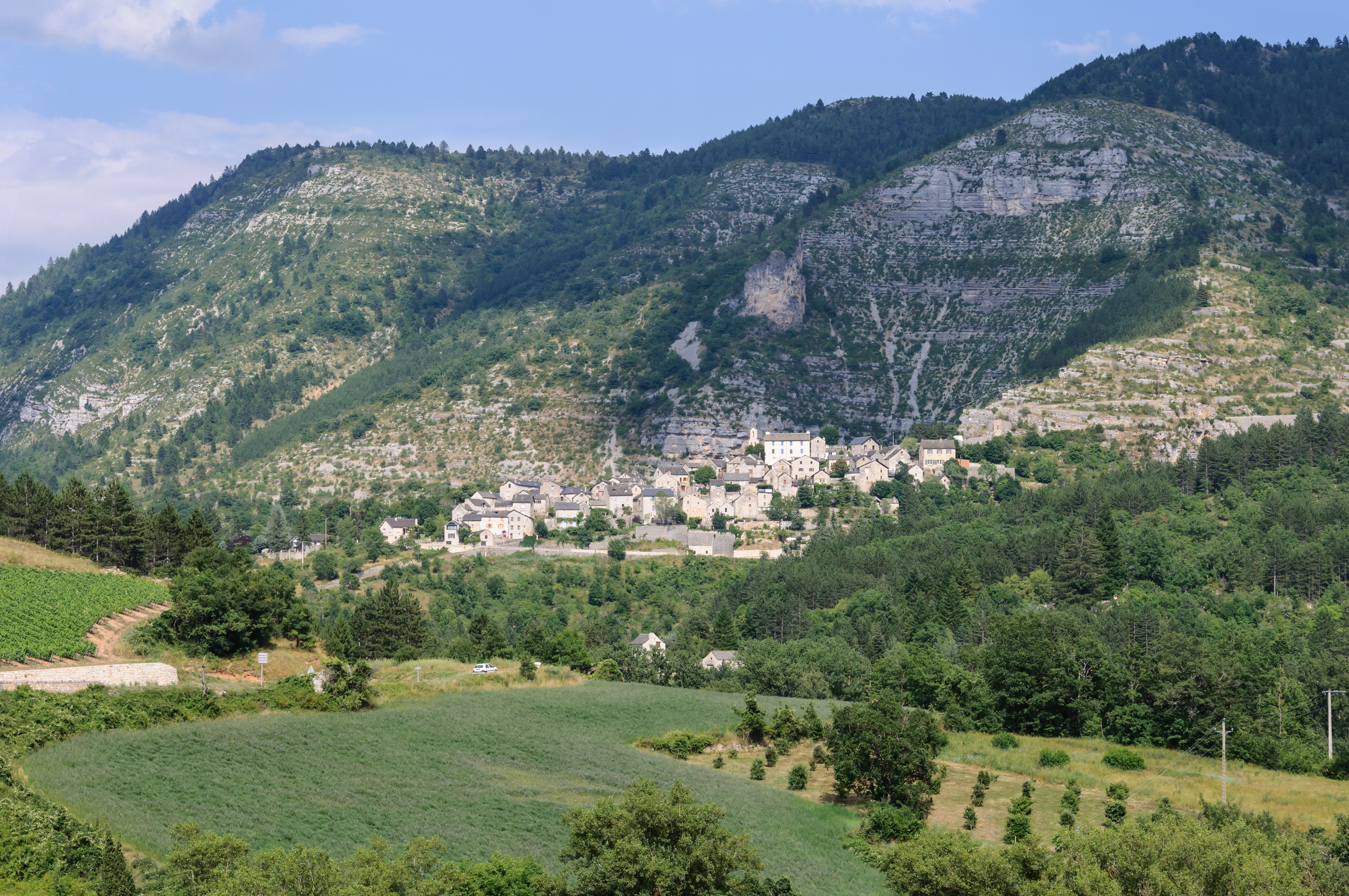
- A general view of Montbrun
- Location of Montbrun
- Location within France Location within Occitanie
- Coordinates: 44°20′17″N 3°30′16″E
- Country: France
- Region: Occitania
- Department: Lozère
- Arrondissement: Florac
- Canton: La Canourgue
- Commune: Gorges du Tarn Causses
- Area^{1}: 29.97 km^{2} (11.57 sq mi)
- Elevation: 550 m (1,800 ft)
- Highest elevation: 1,105 m (3,625 ft)
- Lowest elevation: 479 m (1,572 ft)
- Population (2022): 80
  - Density: 2.7/km^{2} (6.9/sq mi)
- Time zone: UTC+01:00 (CET)
  - Summer (DST): UTC+02:00 (CEST)
- Postal code: 48210
- ^{1} French Land Register data, which excludes lakes, ponds, glaciers > 1 km^{2} (0.386 sq mi or 247 acres) and river estuaries.

Montbrun (French pronunciation: [mɔ̃bʁœ̃]; Montbrun in Occitan) is a former commune in the Lozère departement in southern France. On 1 January 2017, it was merged into the new commune Gorges du Tarn Causses. Its population was 80 in 2022.

== See also ==
- Communes of the Lozère department
- Causse Méjean
