= Arrondissements of the Lozère department =

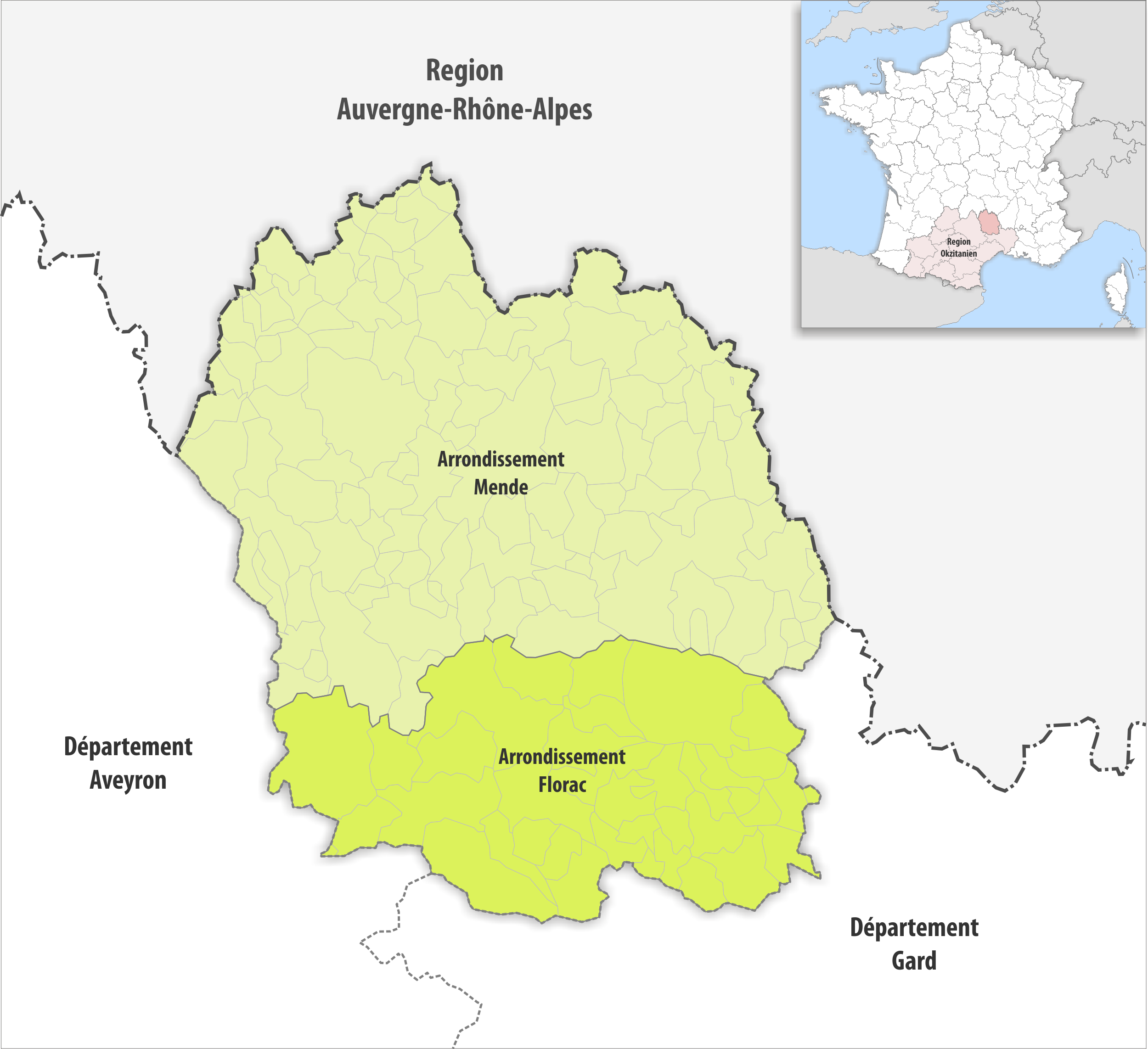
Map of arrondissements of the Lozère department.

The two arrondissements of the Lozère department are:

1. Arrondissement of Florac (subprefecture: Florac-Trois-Rivières), with 38 communes. The population of the arrondissement was 13,028 in 2021.
2. Arrondissement of Mende (prefecture of the Lozère department: Mende), with 114 communes. The population of the arrondissement was 63,491 in 2021.

== History ==
In 1800, the arrondissements of Mende, Florac and Marvejols were established. The arrondissement of Marvejols was disbanded in 1926.
