= Saint-Chély-du-Tarn =

Village in France

Coordinates: 44°20′9″N 3°23′3″E

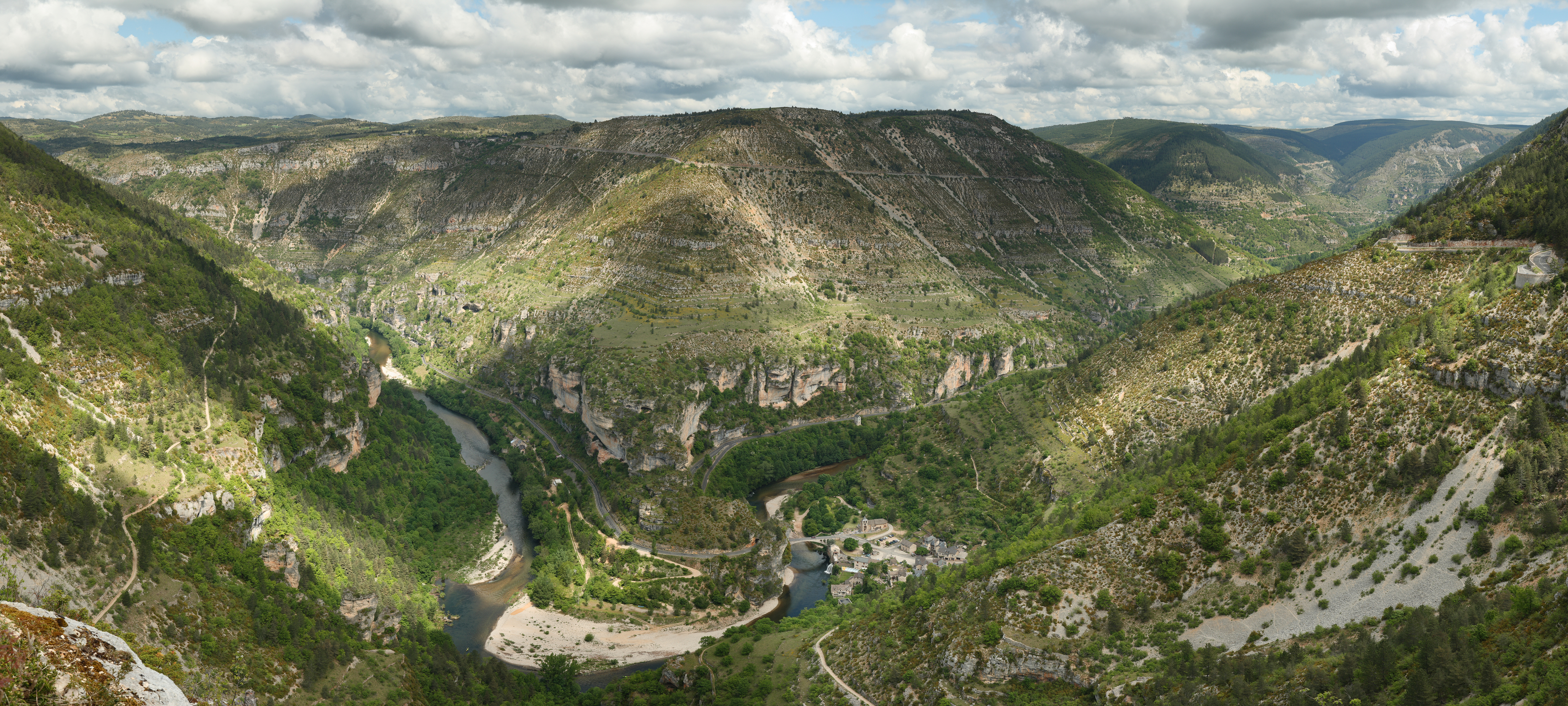
View over the cirque of Pougnadoire and Saint-Chély-du-Tarn village, in the Tarn Gorges

Saint-Chély-du-Tarn is a village in the commune of Sainte-Enimie, of the Lozère département in France. It is located in the Gorges du Tarn. Saint-Chély-du-Tarn can be accessed via an arched bridge across the Tarn river.
