= Albaret-Sainte-Marie =

- Commune
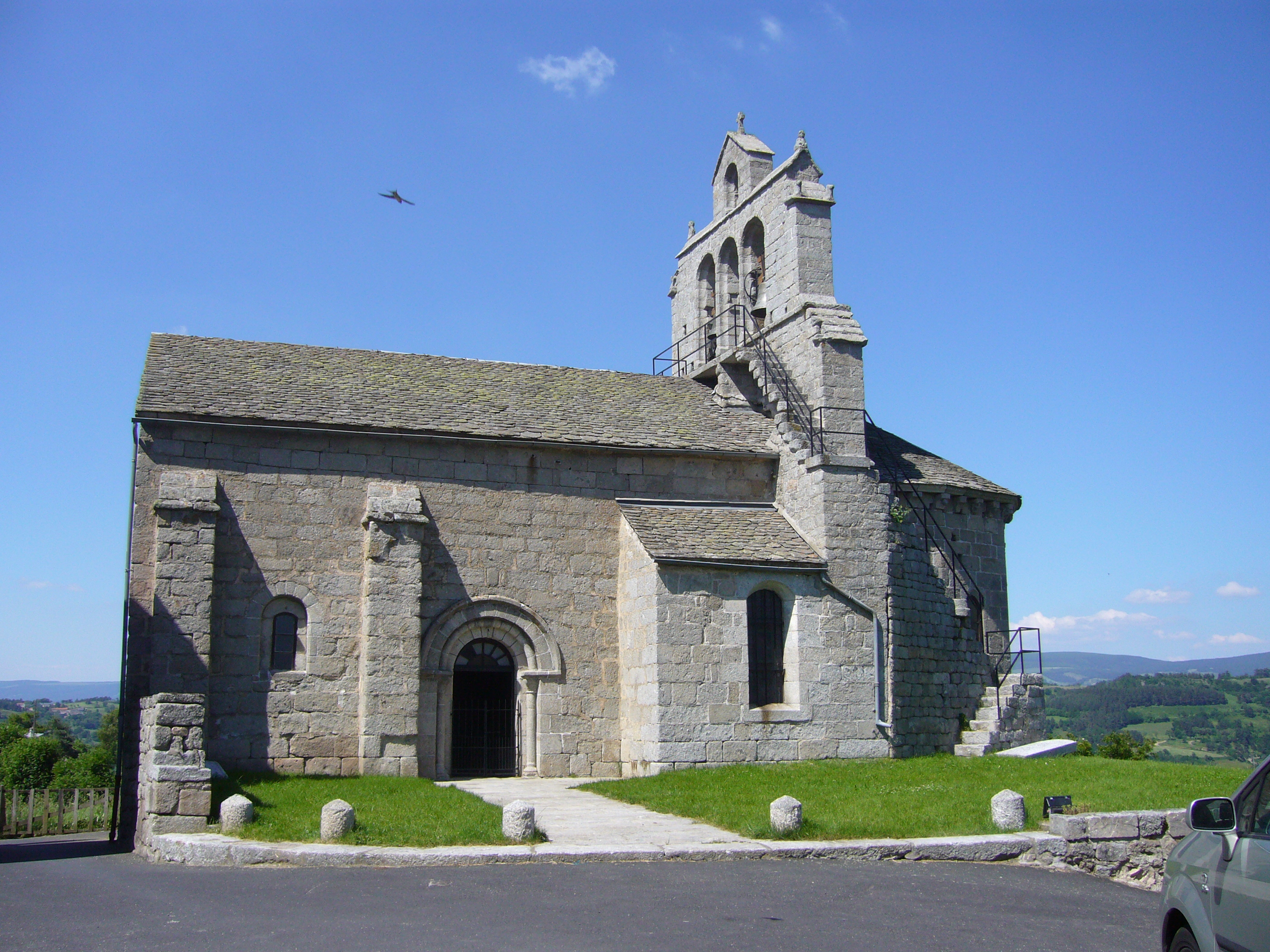
- The church of Albaret
- Location of Albaret-Sainte-Marie
- Location within France Location within Occitanie
- Coordinates: 44°52′59″N 3°14′53″E
- Country: France
- Region: Occitania
- Department: Lozère
- Arrondissement: Mende
- Canton: Saint-Chély-d'Apcher
- Intercommunality: Terres d'Apcher-Margeride-Aubrac

Government
  - Mayor (2020–2026): Michel Thérond
- Area^{1}: 15.98 km^{2} (6.17 sq mi)
- Elevation: 970 m (3,180 ft)
- Highest elevation: 1,139 m (3,737 ft)
- Lowest elevation: 767 m (2,516 ft)
- Population (2023): 559
  - Density: 35.0/km^{2} (90.6/sq mi)
- Time zone: UTC+01:00 (CET)
  - Summer (DST): UTC+02:00 (CEST)
- INSEE/Postal code: 48002 /48200
- ^{1} French Land Register data, which excludes lakes, ponds, glaciers > 1 km^{2} (0.386 sq mi or 247 acres) and river estuaries.

Albaret-Sainte-Marie (French pronunciation: [albaʁɛ sɛ̃t maʁi]; Occitan: Aubaret) is a commune in the Lozère department in southern France.

== Population ==
Historical population
Year	Pop.	±% p.a.
1968	320	—
1975	309	−0.50%
1982	333	+1.07%
1990	338	+0.19%
1999	452	+3.28%
2007	537	+2.18%
2012	569	+1.16%
2017	568	−0.04%
2023	559	−0.27%
Source: INSEE

== See also ==
- Communes of the Lozère department
