= Prunières, Lozère =

Prunières
- Commune
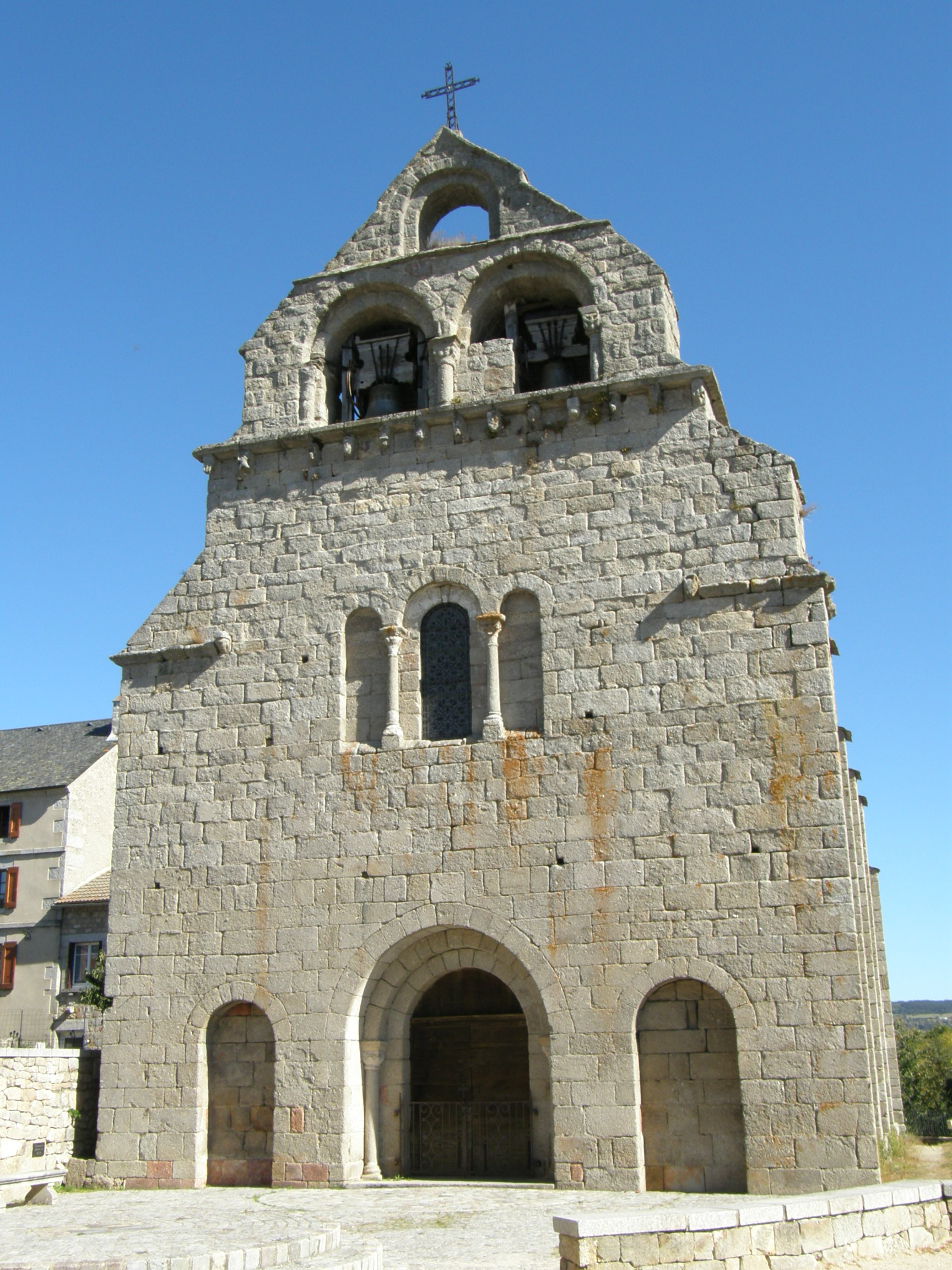
- The Church of Saint-Caprais, in Prunières

- Coat of arms
- Location of Prunières
- Location within France Location within Occitanie
- Coordinates: 44°49′38″N 3°20′35″E
- Country: France
- Region: Occitania
- Department: Lozère
- Arrondissement: Mende
- Canton: Saint-Chély-d'Apcher

Government
  - Mayor (2020–2026): Roland Odoul
- Area^{1}: 13.09 km^{2} (5.05 sq mi)
- Elevation: 1,030 m (3,380 ft)
- Highest elevation: 1,121 m (3,678 ft)
- Lowest elevation: 868 m (2,848 ft)
- Population (2023): 226
  - Density: 17.3/km^{2} (44.7/sq mi)
- Time zone: UTC+01:00 (CET)
  - Summer (DST): UTC+02:00 (CEST)
- INSEE/Postal code: 48121 /48200
- ^{1} French Land Register data, which excludes lakes, ponds, glaciers > 1 km^{2} (0.386 sq mi or 247 acres) and river estuaries.

Prunières (French pronunciation: [pʁynjɛʁ]; Occitan: Prunièiras) is a commune in the Lozère department in southern France.

== See also ==
- Communes of the Lozère department
