= Quézac, Lozère =

Quézac
- Part of Gorges du Tarn Causses
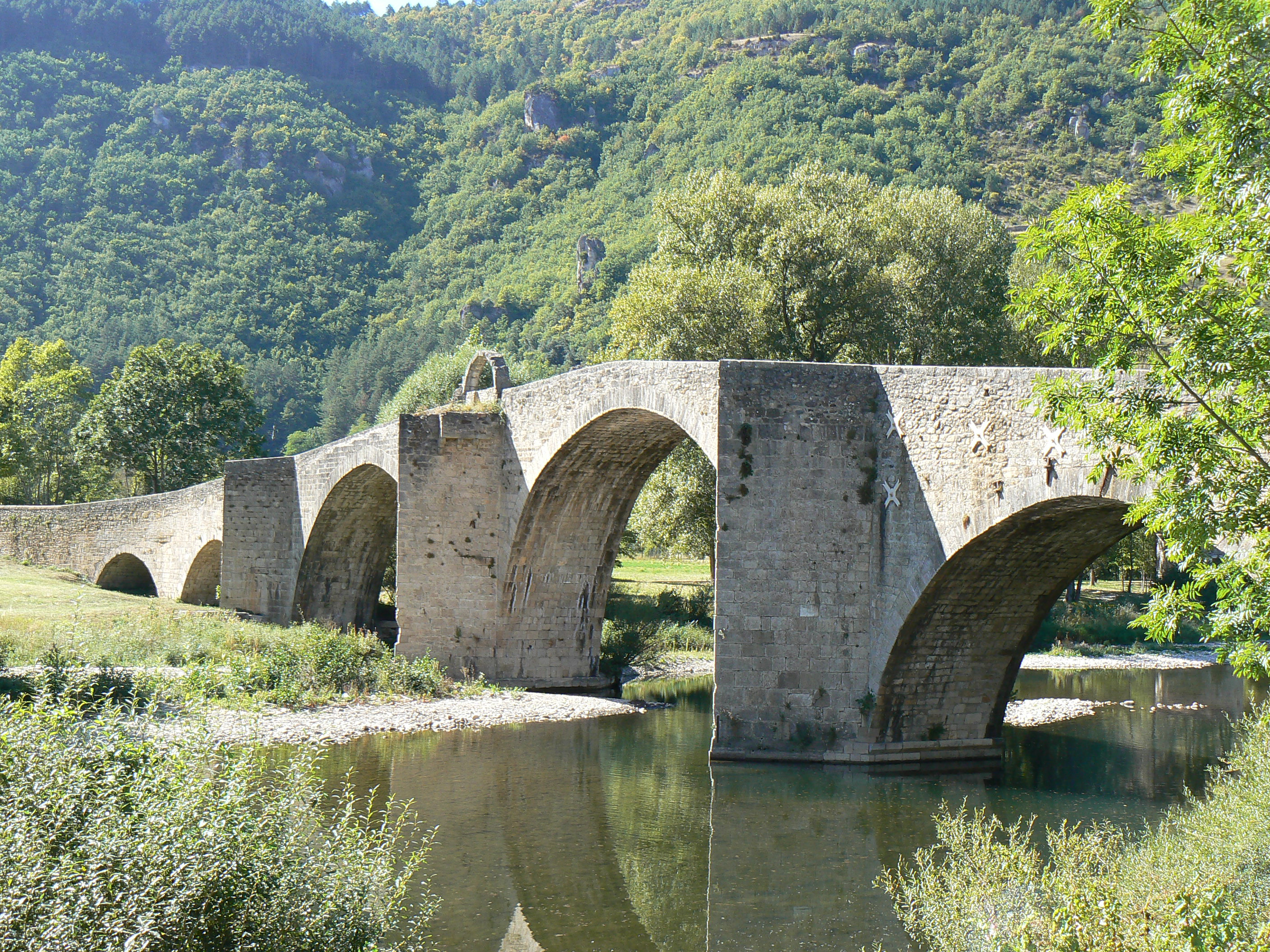
- Bridge over the river Tarn in Quézac

- Coat of arms
- Location of Quézac
- Location within France Location within Occitanie
- Coordinates: 44°22′15″N 3°31′33″E
- Country: France
- Region: Occitania
- Department: Lozère
- Arrondissement: Florac
- Canton: Florac
- Commune: Gorges du Tarn Causses
- Area^{1}: 26.91 km^{2} (10.39 sq mi)
- Elevation: 600 m (2,000 ft)
- Highest elevation: 1,080 m (3,540 ft)
- Lowest elevation: 479 m (1,572 ft)
- Population (2022): 321
  - Density: 11.9/km^{2} (30.9/sq mi)
- Time zone: UTC+01:00 (CET)
  - Summer (DST): UTC+02:00 (CEST)
- Postal code: 48320
- ^{1} French Land Register data, which excludes lakes, ponds, glaciers > 1 km^{2} (0.386 sq mi or 247 acres) and river estuaries.

Quézac (French pronunciation: [kezak]; Occitan: Quesac) is a former commune in the Lozère department in southern France. On 1 January 2017, it was merged into the new commune Gorges du Tarn Causses. Its population was 321 in 2022.

== See also ==
- Communes of the Lozère department
