= Cantons of Mende =

Coordinates: 44.52°N 3.50°E

The cantons of Mende are administrative divisions of the Lozère department, in southern France. Since the French canton reorganisation which came into effect in March 2015, the town of Mende is subdivided into 2 cantons. Their seat is in Mende.

== Population ==
Name	Population (2019)	Cantonal Code
Canton of Mende-1	6,388	4809
Canton of Mende-2	5,930	4810
