= Lozère =

Department of France in Occitanie

Lozère Losera (Occitan)
- Department
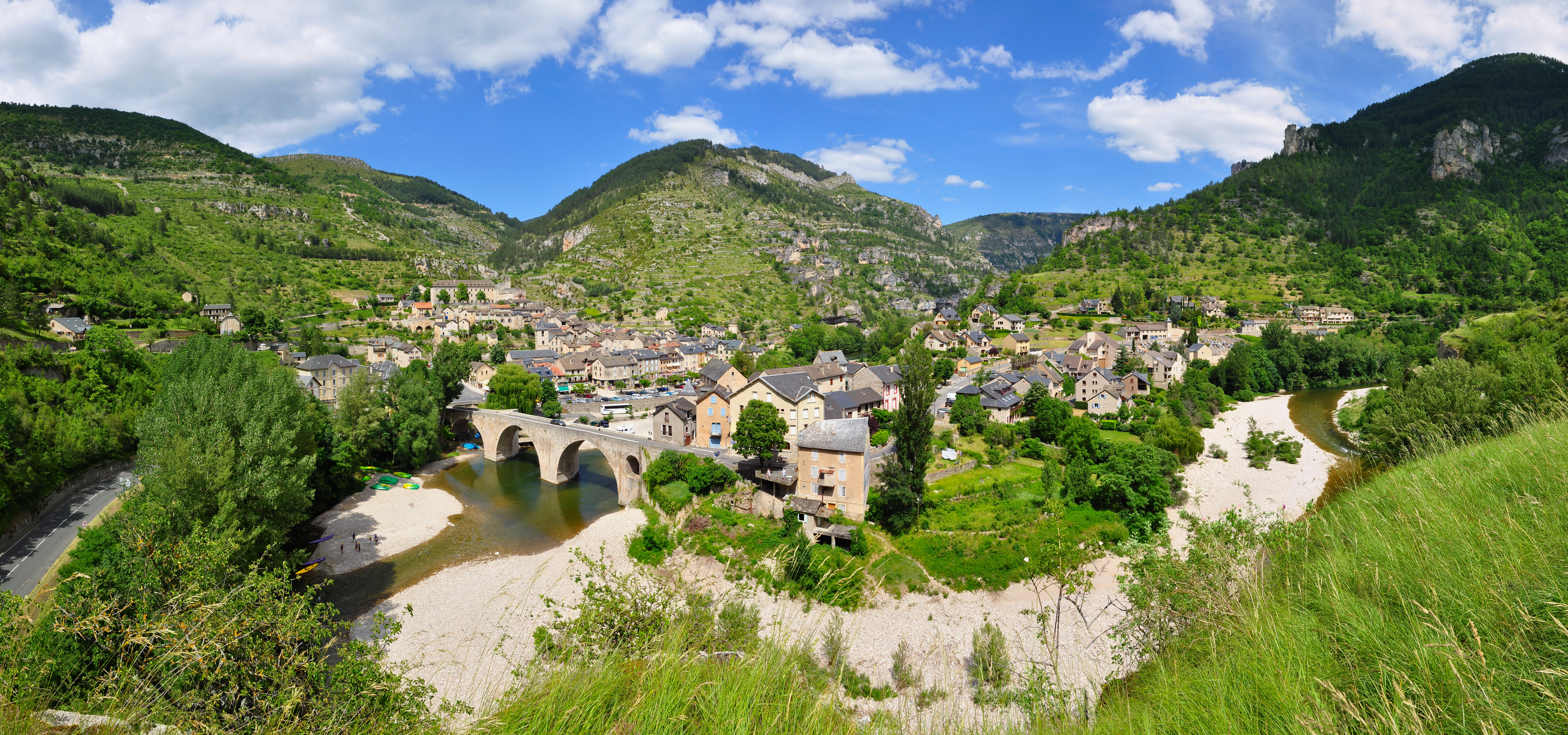
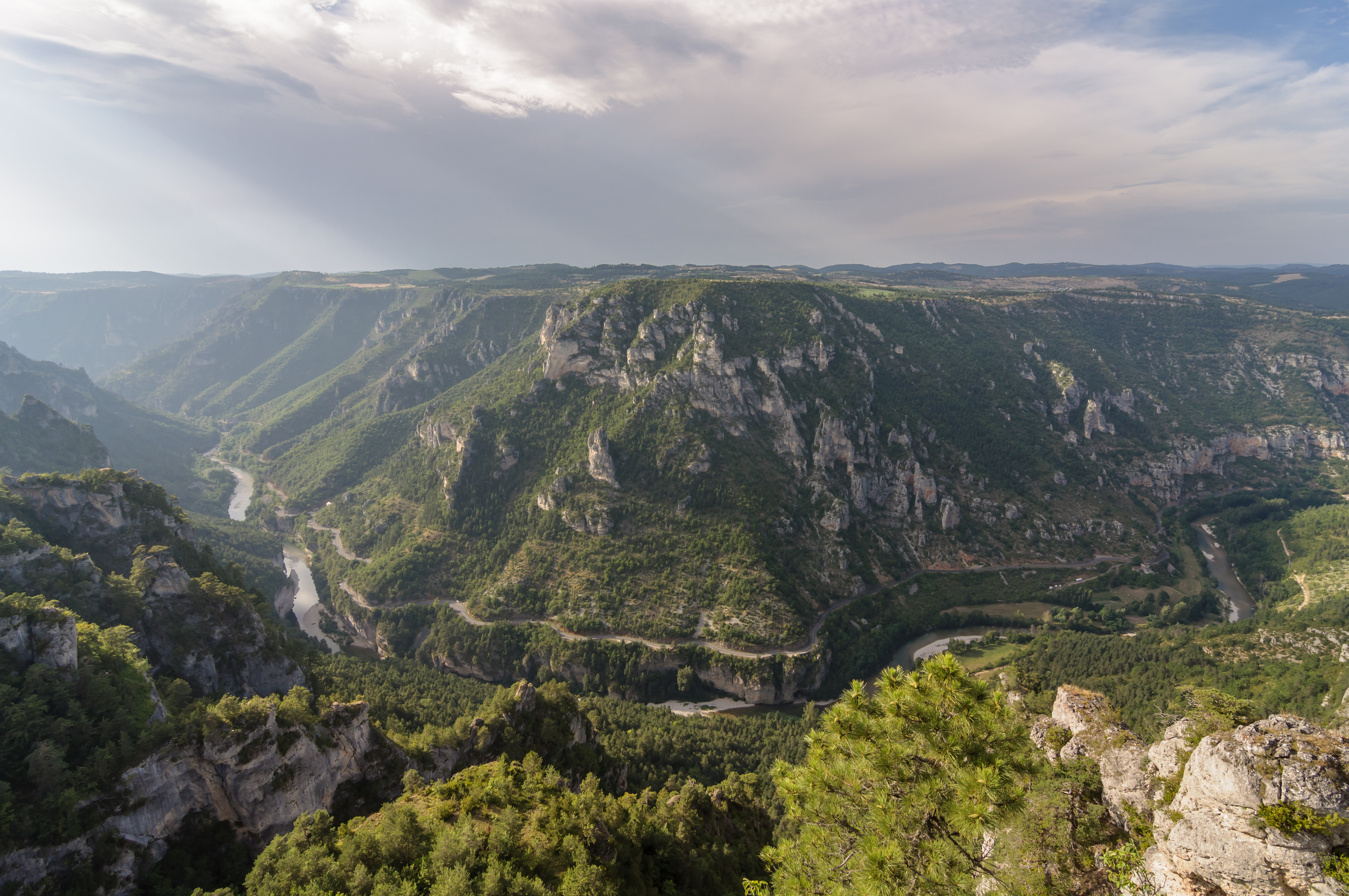
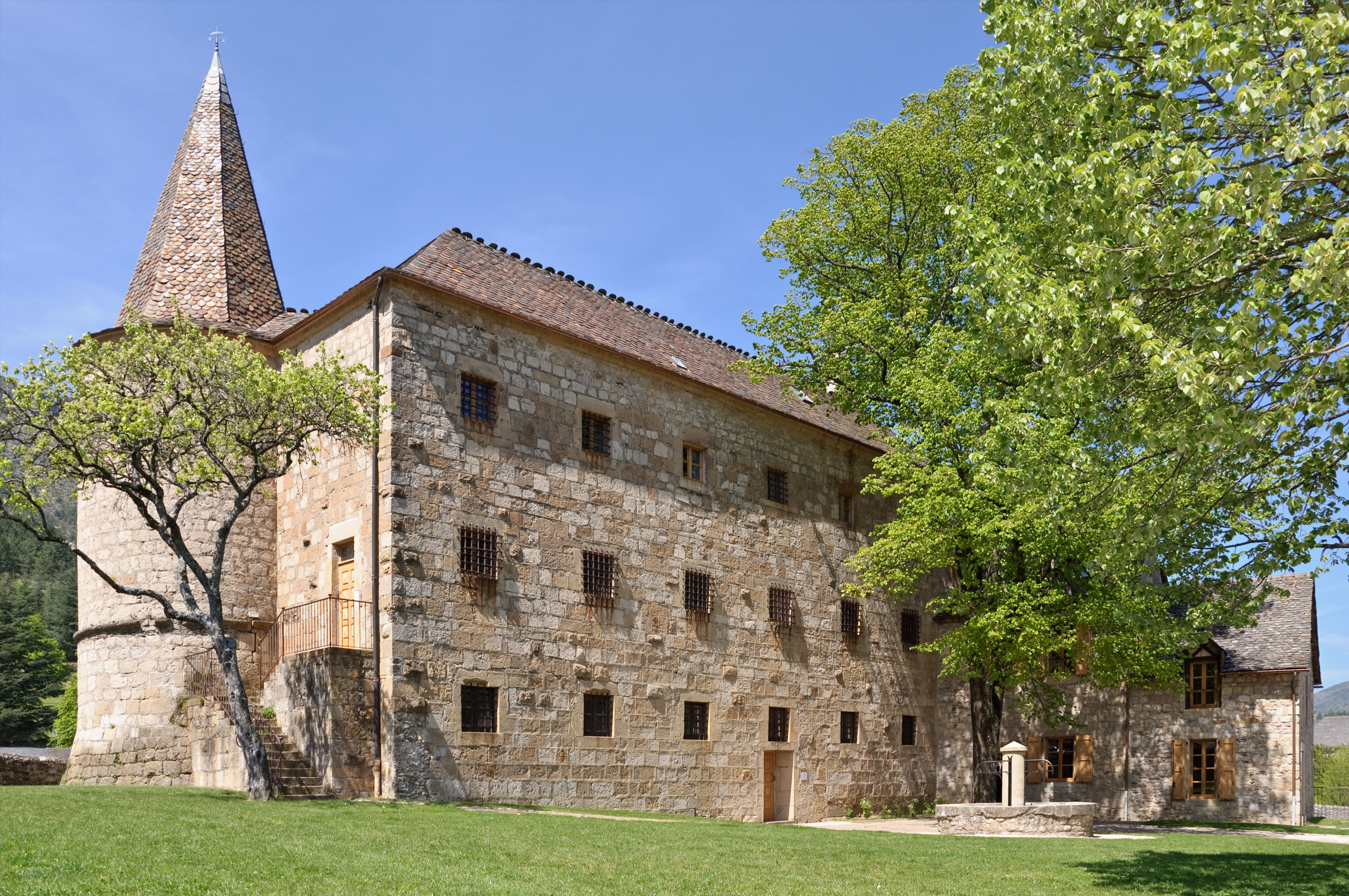
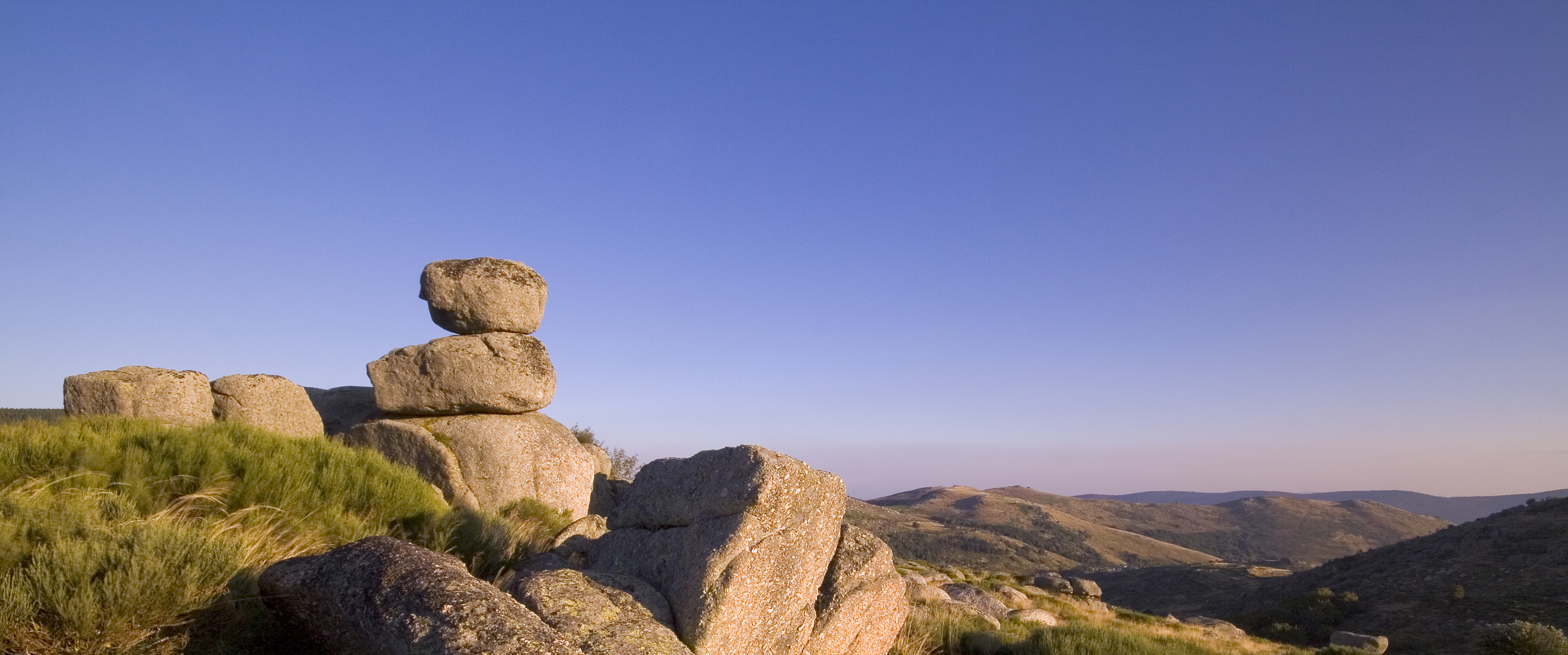
- From top down, left to right: Sainte-Enimie, the Gorges du Tarn in La Malène, Castle of Florac, Mont Lozère

- Flag Coat of arms

- Location of Lozère in France
- Coordinates: 44°20′N 3°36′E
- Country: France
- Region: Occitanie
- Departement: 4 March 1790
- Prefecture: Mende
- Subprefecture: Florac Trois Rivières

Government
  - President of the Departmental Council: Sophie Pantel (PS)

Area
  - Total: 5,167 km^{2} (1,995 sq mi)

Population (2023)
  - Total: 76,486
  - Rank: 102nd
  - Density: 14.80/km^{2} (38.34/sq mi)
- Demonym: Lozériens
- Time zone: UTC+1 (CET)
  - Summer (DST): UTC+2 (CEST)
- ISO 3166 code: FR-48
- Department number: 48
- Arrondissements: 2
- Cantons: 13
- Communes: 152
- Website: lozere.fr

The Lozère (French pronunciation: [lɔzɛʁ]; Occitan: Losera [luˈzeɾɔ]) is a landlocked department in the region of Occitanie in southern France, located near the Massif Central, bounded to the northeast by Haute-Loire, to the east by Ardèche, to the south by Gard, to the west by Aveyron, and the northwest by Cantal. It is named after Mont Lozère. With 76,486 inhabitants as of 2023, it is the least populous French department.

== History ==
The Lozère was created in 1790 during the French Revolution, when the whole of France was divided into departments, replacing the old provinces. It was formed from part of the old province of Languedoc.

Pliny's Natural History praised the cheese of the Lozère:

The kinds of cheese that are most esteemed at Rome, where the various good things of all nations are to be judged of by comparison, are those that come from the provinces of Nemausus, and more especially the area (Note: Pliny's term is pagus, a Latin equivalent of pays.) there of Lesura and Gabalis (Lozère and Gévaudan); but its excellence is only very short-lived, and it must be eaten while it is fresh.

Between 1764 and 1767, the Beast of Gévaudan, a creature believed to be a large wolf or an exotic animal, terrorized the general area in the Margeride Mountains of the former province of Gévaudan (nearly identical with the modern Lozère department).

== Geography ==
The Lozère has an area of 5,167 km^{2} (1,995 sq mi). It is the northernmost department of the current Occitanie region and is surrounded by five departments belonging to two regions: Cantal, Haute-Loire and Ardèche departments of the Auvergne-Rhône-Alpes region, and Gard and Aveyron departments of the Occitanie region.

The geography of the Lozère is complicated, covering four mountain ranges. In the north-west, the basalt plateau of Aubrac rises between 1,000 and 1,450 m (3,280 and 4,760 ft), with a cold humid climate influenced by the Atlantic. The north and north-east of the department contains the Margeride mountains, which are formed of granite, and have peaks between 1,000 and 1,550 m (3,280 and 5,090 ft). The climate here is also cold, but drier than in Aubrac, with less snow.

The Causses are a series of very dry limestone plateaus in the south-west, and the south-east contains the Cévennes, which include the highest point in the department, the granite Mont Lozère at 1,702 m (5,584 ft).

The department also contains numerous rivers, above and below ground, including the Tarn, whose source is on Mont Lozère, and which flows through the Gorges du Tarn in the Causses.

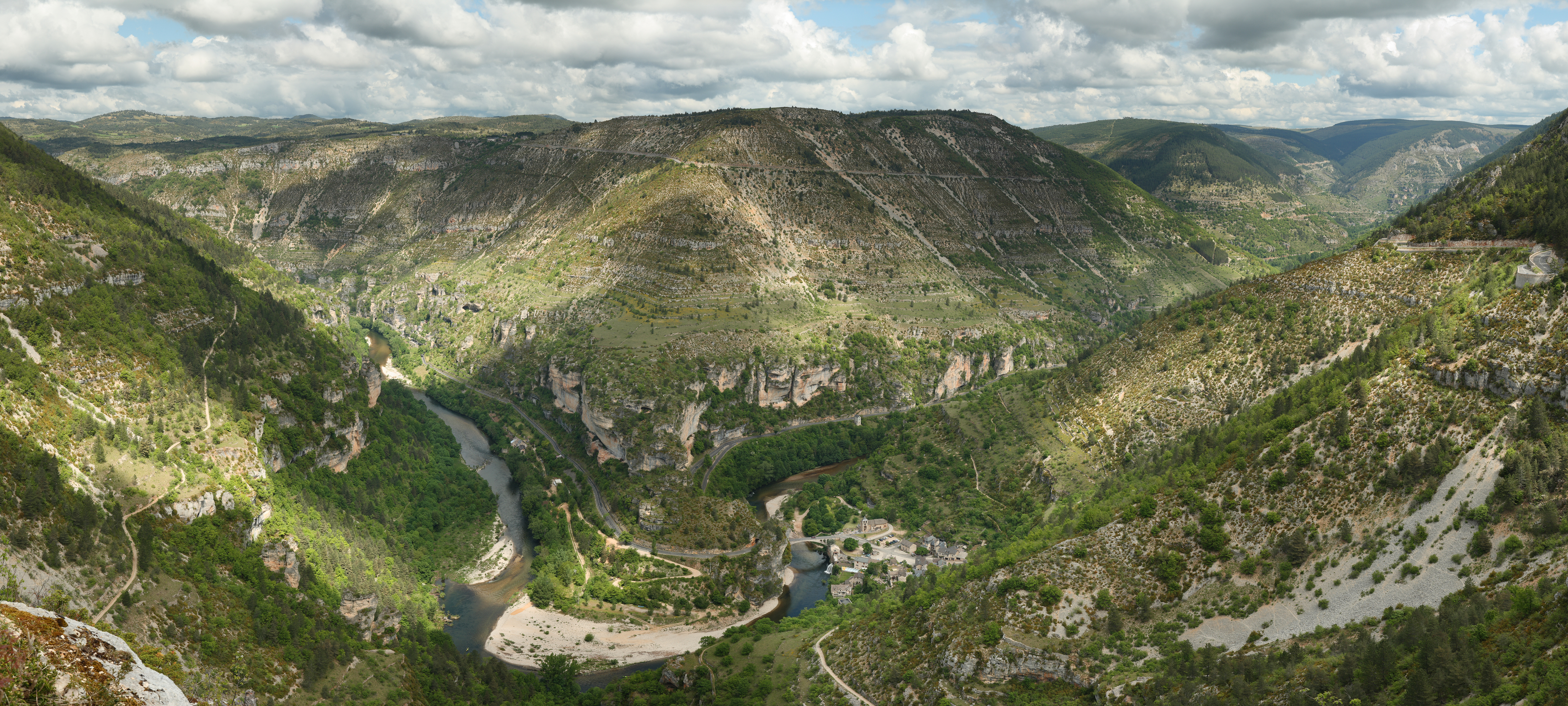
View over the cirque of Pougnadoire and Saint-Chély-du-Tarn village, in the Tarn Gorges

== Demographics ==
Population development since 1801:

Historical population

Year	Pop.	±% p.a.
1801	126,503	—
1806	143,247	+2.52%
1821	133,934	−0.45%
1831	140,347	+0.47%
1841	140,788	+0.03%
1851	144,705	+0.27%
1861	137,367	−0.52%
1872	135,190	−0.15%
1881	143,565	+0.67%
1891	135,517	−0.58%
1901	128,866	−0.50%
1911	122,738	−0.49%
1921	108,822	−1.20%
1931	101,849	−0.66%

Year	Pop.	±% p.a.
1936	98,480	−0.67%
1946	90,523	−0.84%
1954	82,391	−1.17%
1962	81,868	−0.08%
1968	77,258	−0.96%
1975	74,825	−0.46%
1982	74,294	−0.10%
1990	72,825	−0.25%
1999	73,509	+0.10%
2007	76,880	+0.56%
2012	76,889	+0.00%
2017	76,601	−0.08%
2023	76,486	−0.03%

The Lozère is the least populated French department, and the least densely populated in Metropolitan France. Its 2019 population of 76,604 gives it a population density of 14.8 inhabitants/km^{2}. The department boasts a population similar in size to that of the country of Andorra, which borders France to the south. Since the end of the 19th century the department has seen its population decline due to negative migration, the last fifteen years have nevertheless shown a new upward trend. The reasons given for this trend are the quality of the living environment, the improvement of the road transport and communication network and to a lesser extent heliotropism. It is nevertheless an elderly population with high purchasing power. The inhabitants of the Lozère are known, in French, as Lozériens and Lozériennes.

The population is concentrated in three main urban centers: Mende, Saint-Chély-d'Apcher and Marvejols which together account for a third of the department's population. Some other small centers (Langogne, Florac, Aumont-Aubrac, La Canourgue, etc.) appear as small living areas but are unable to attract young people, including the exodus towards neighboring metropolises (Clermont-Ferrand in the north, Montpellier and Nîmes to the south) is increasingly important.

Because of its low population density, it is considered to fall within the empty diagonal. The department also has the lowest urbanization rate in France, with only 25% of its population in cities (compared to the national average of 82%).

=== Principal towns ===
The most populous commune is Mende, the prefecture. As of 2023, there are 8 communes with more than 2,000 inhabitants:

Commune	Population (2023)
Mende	12,464
Marvejols	4,764
Saint-Chély-d'Apcher	3,955
Langogne	2,836
Peyre en Aubrac	2,296
Florac Trois Rivières	2,100
Bourgs sur Colagne	2,091
La Canourgue	2,074

== Administration ==
The département is managed by the Departmental Council of Lozère in Mende. As of 2015, the President of the council is Sophie Pantel. The Lozère is part of the region of Occitanie.

=== Administrative divisions ===
There are 2 arrondissements, 13 cantons and 152 communes in Lozère.

INSEE code	Arrondissement	Capital	Population (2023)	Area (km^{2})	Density (inhabitants/km^{2})	Communes
481	Florac	Florac	13,088	1,687	7.8	38
482	Mende	Mende	63,398	3,479	18.2	114

The following is a list of the 13 cantons of the Lozère department (with their INSEE codes), following the French canton reorganisation which came into effect in March 2015:

1. Bourgs sur Colagne (4803)
2. La Canourgue (4802)
3. Le Collet-de-Dèze (4804)
4. Florac Trois Rivières (4805)
5. Grandrieu (4806)
6. Langogne (4807)
7. Marvejols (4808)
8. Mende-1 (4809)
9. Mende-2 (4810)
10. Peyre en Aubrac (4801)
11. Saint-Alban-sur-Limagnole (4811)
12. Saint-Chély-d'Apcher (4812)
13. Saint-Étienne-du-Valdonnez (4813)

== Economy ==
The main activities are cattle farming and tourism. There is barely any arable farming in the Lozère due to poor soil quality. The hardy Aubrac is the most commonly farmed cattle breed here.

The region has one of the lowest rates of unemployment in France, which may be attributed to the enforced long-standing tradition whereby young people emigrate to cities such as Lyon, Marseille, and Montpellier when they reach working age.

=== Land use ===
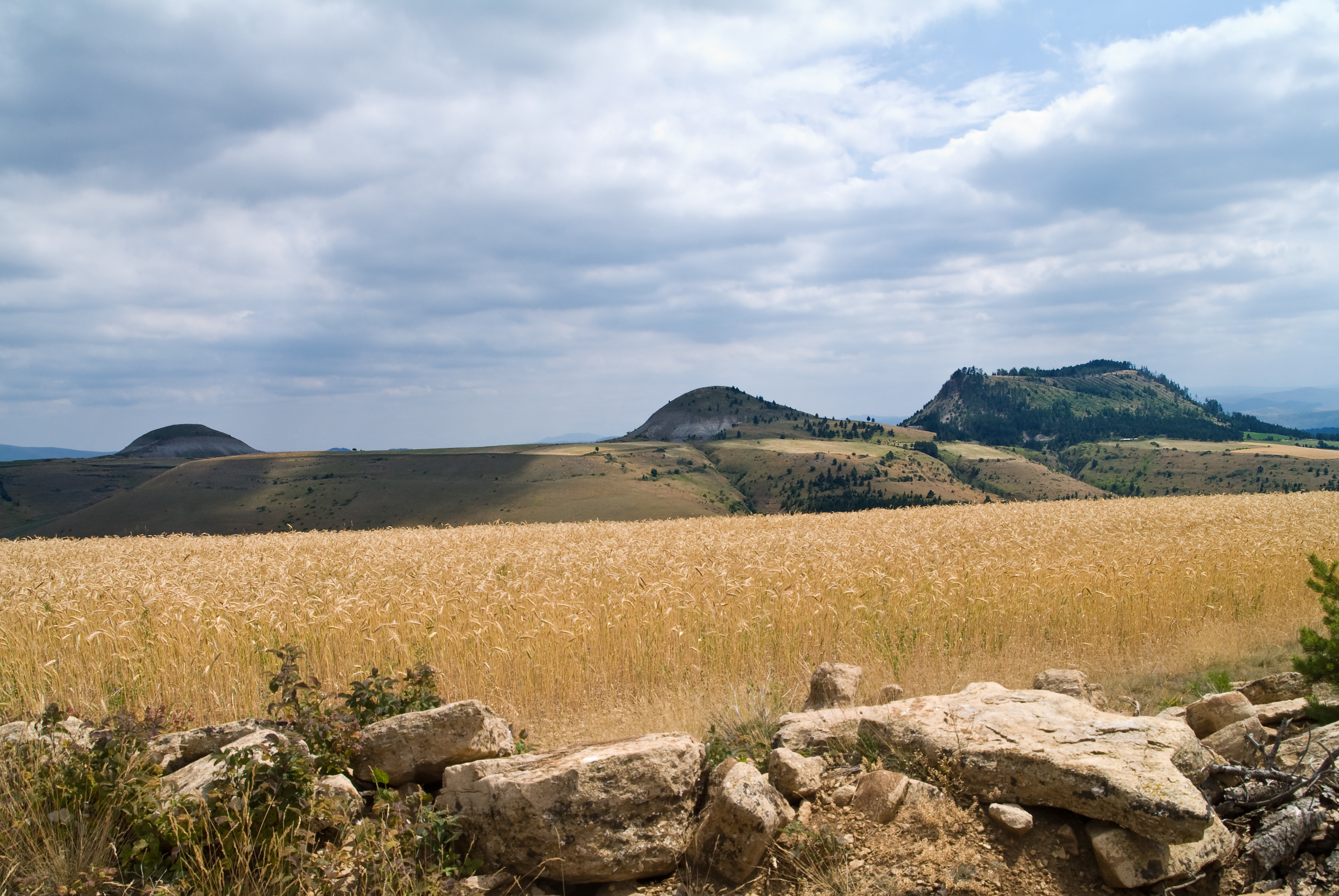
Grain fields near Les Bondons, dominated by the hills called Puechs des Bondons

The Lozère is a rural department, with relatively little land taken up by roads and buildings. Overall the land use is divided as follows:

- Forest 43.81%
- Heath & other open land 31.19%
- Arable land 12.74%
- Fields 11.36%
- Roads and buildings 0.54%
- Rivers and ponds 0.3%

== Politics ==
=== Current National Assembly Representative ===
Constituency	Member	Party
Lozère's constituency	Sophie Pantel	Socialist Party

== Tourism ==
Tourist activities include caving and a variety of sports, such as skiing and kayaking. The Lozère contains a part of the Cévennes National Park. It is considered one of the best areas in France for trout fishing. Rivers such as the Lot, Tarn and Truyère are particularly noted for their trout populations.

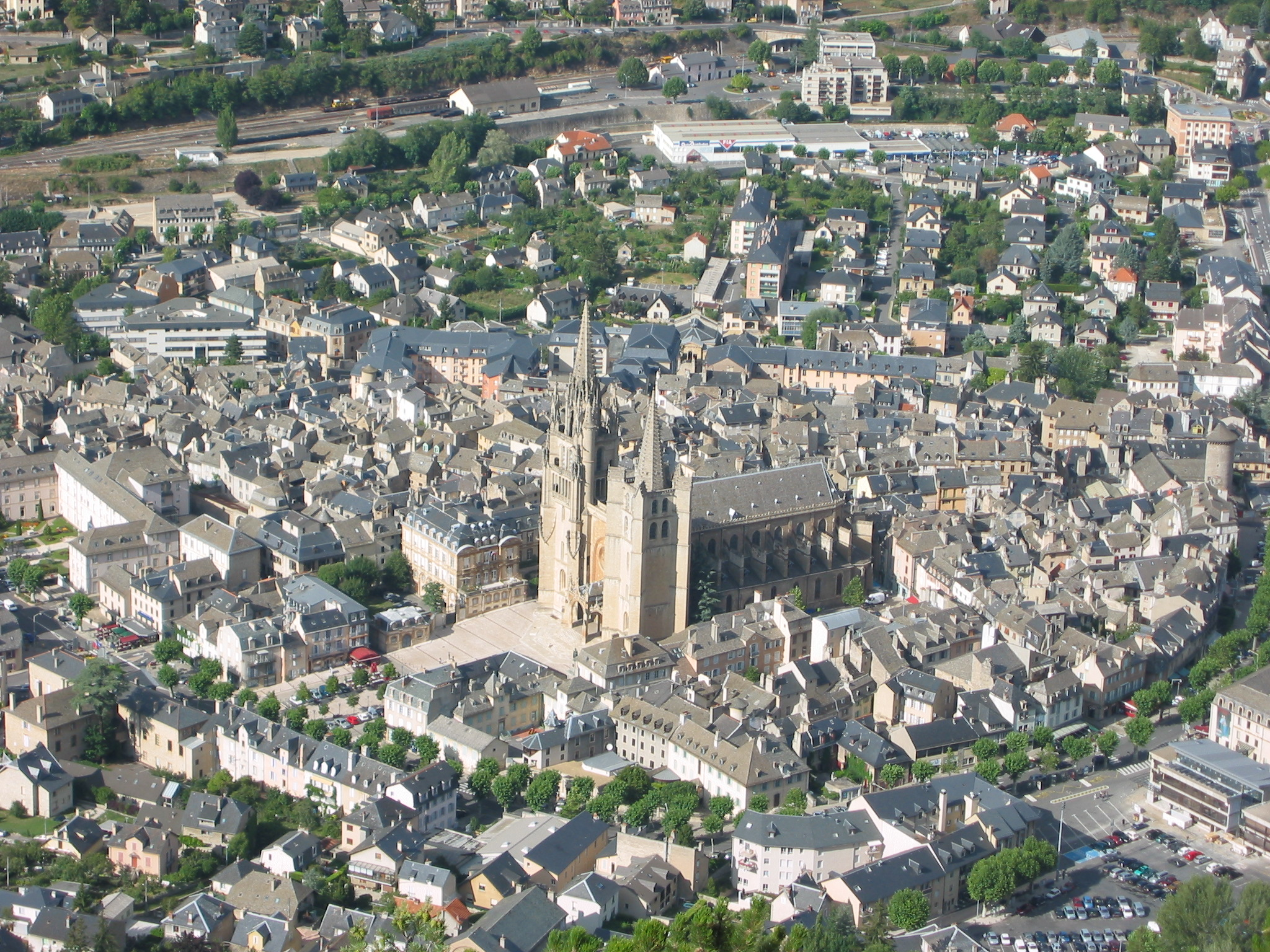
Mende

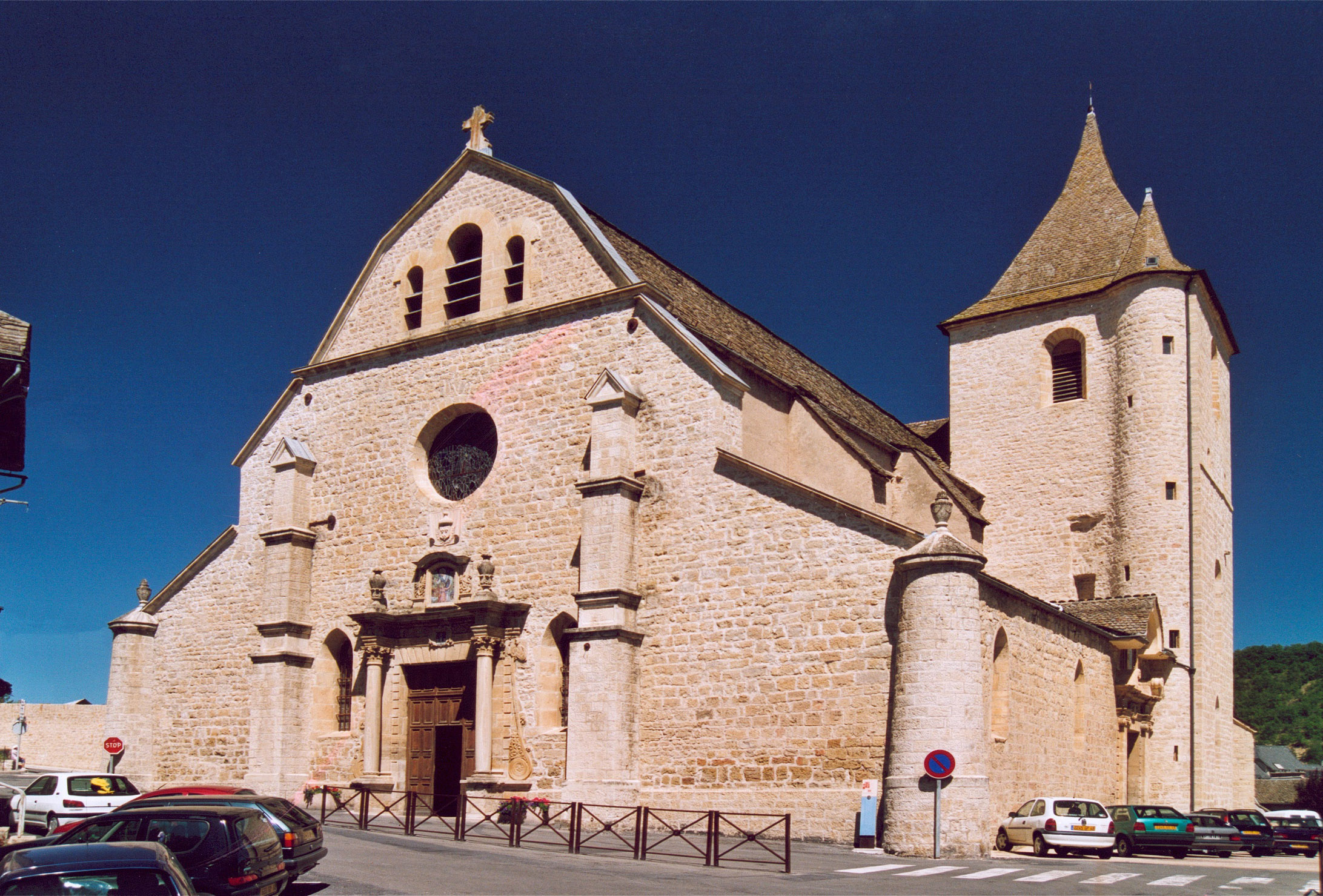
Church of Marvejols

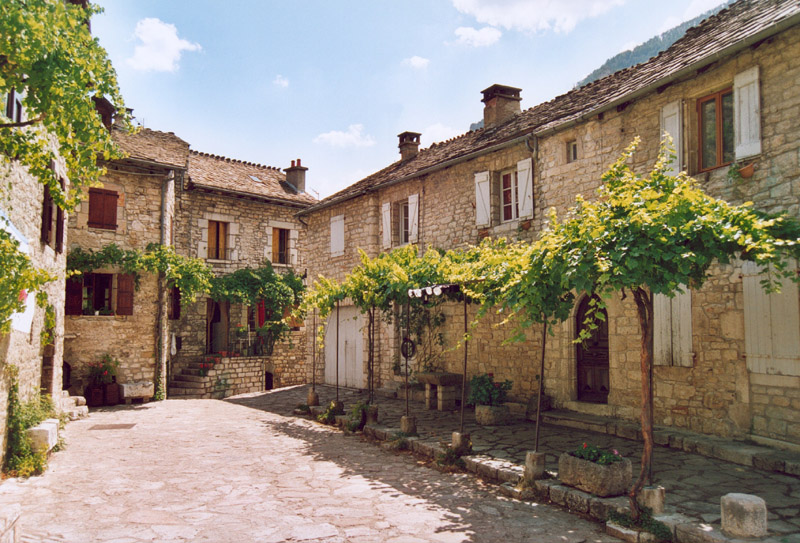
Sainte-Enimie, one of the most beautiful villages of France

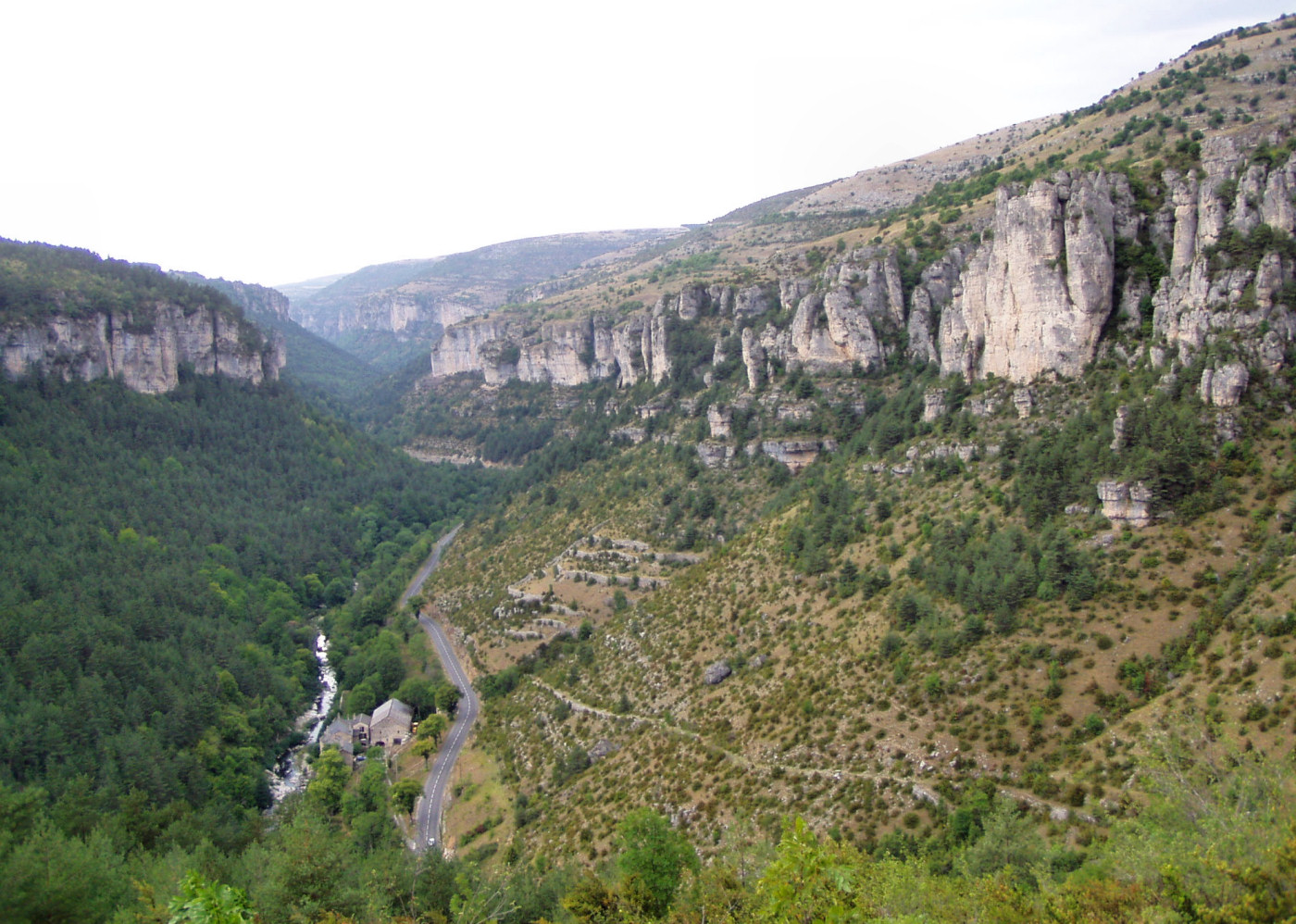
Cévennes National Park

== See also ==
- Arrondissements of the Lozère department
- Cantons of the Lozère department
- Communes of the Lozère department
- Crueize Viaduct
