= Aubrac =

Plateau in the southern Massif Central of France

Coordinates: 44.567°N 3.082°E

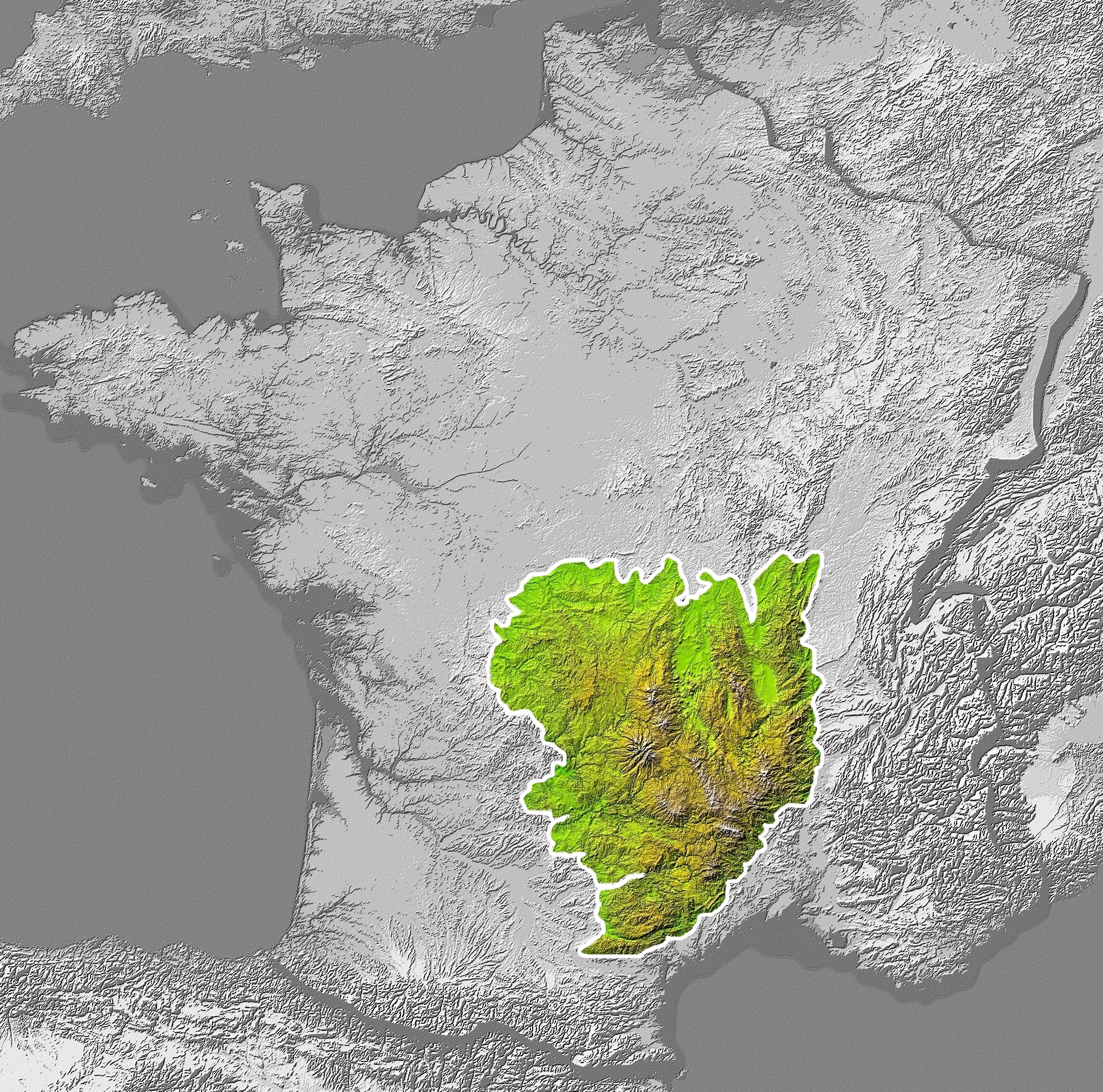
Location of the Massif Central in France

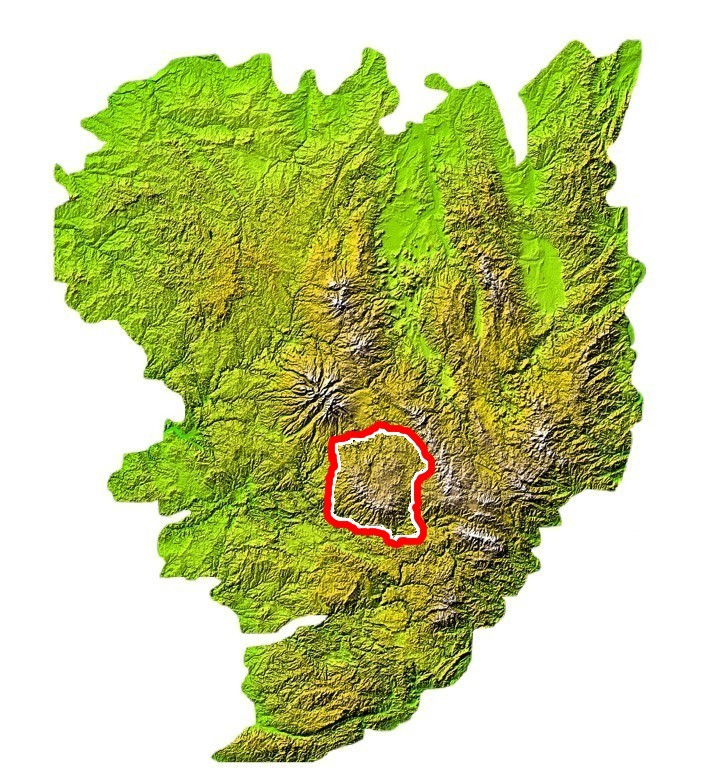
Location of Aubrac in the Massif Central

Aubrac (French pronunciation: [obʁak]) is a volcanic and granitic plateau located in the south-central Massif Central of France. This region has been a member of the Natura 2000 network since August 2006. It straddles three départements (Cantal, Aveyron and Lozère) and three régions (Auvergne, Midi-Pyrénées and Languedoc-Roussillon). The village of the same name is located in this region.

== Geography, geology ==
Map of Aubrac

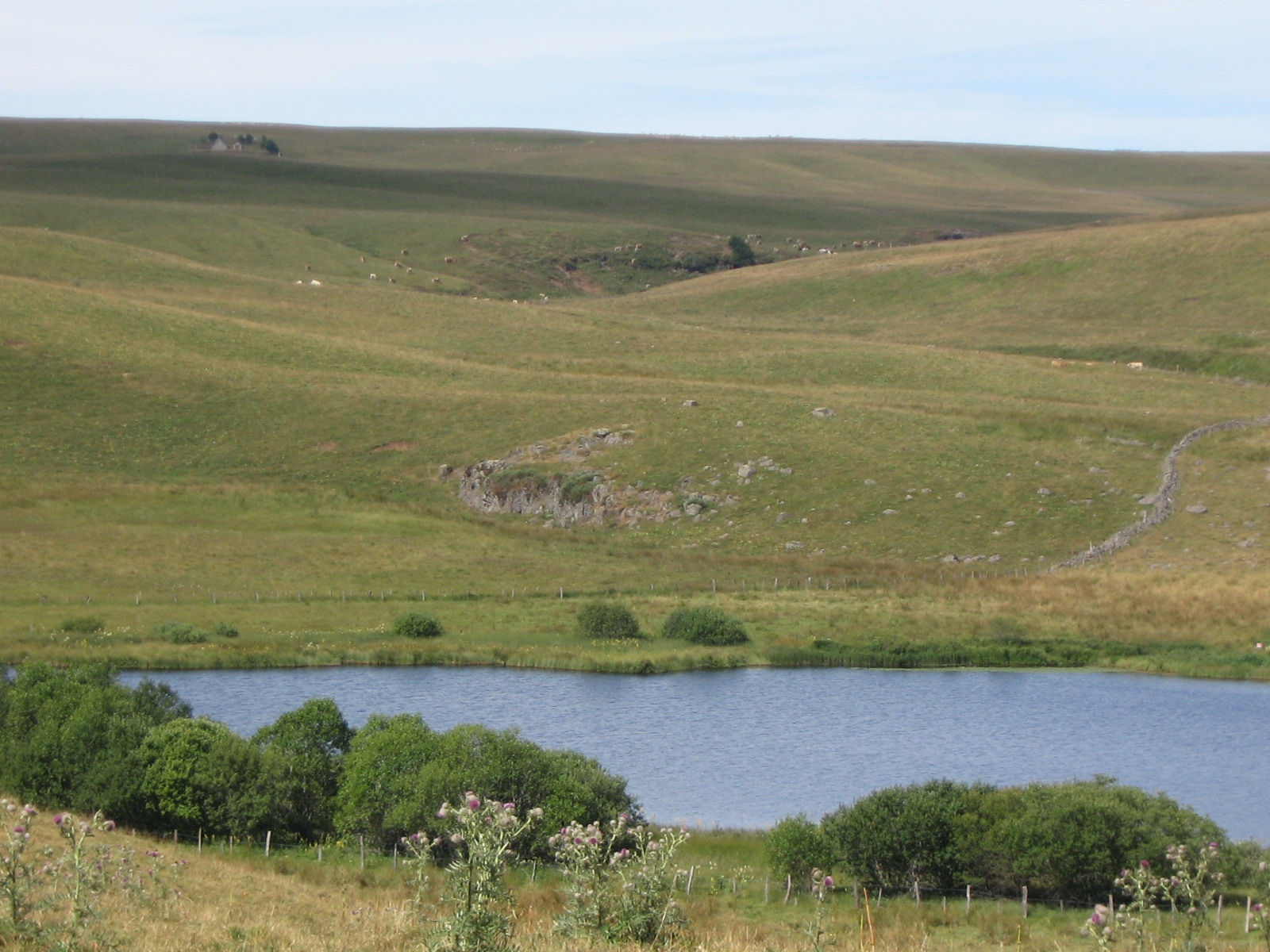
The Souveyrols lake and a typical landscape of the Aubrac plateau around it.

Aubrac is a volcanic and granitic plateau that extends over an area of 1,500 km^{2}. The volcanic eruptions occurred between 6 and 9 million year ago and were of Hawaiian type with fluid lavas. There are therefore no individual volcanic cones. The volcanic zone occupies the west side while the other part of the plateau is formed of granite. The average altitude is about 1,200 meters with the highest point at 1,469 meters (Signal de Mailhebiau) in the south. All the region has been eroded by glaciers during three glacial periods. The Aubrac includes four glacial lakes: lac des Salhiens, lac de Saint-Andéol, lac de Souveyrols and lac de Born. In the south, the highest summits of the Aubrac dominate the Lot valley, which lies 1,000 m below.

== Economy ==
Bovine breeding is the main activity on the plateau. Aubrac has its own bovine species called "Aubrac", which is well adapted to the environment. The cows are bred for their meat while, before the 1960s, they were bred for their dairy products. The milk was made into cheese in "burons" or " mazucs ", which are small structures in the middle of the pastures. Today, the majority of these structures are in ruin. The "Laguiole" (pronounced "Layole") cheese is now only made by a dairy in the village of Laguiole and resembles Cantal cheese.

The region is also known for its knife industry. It is here that the Laguiole knife is made by around thirty local craftsmen. The factory of Forge de Laguiole was designed by Phillippe Starck.

== History ==
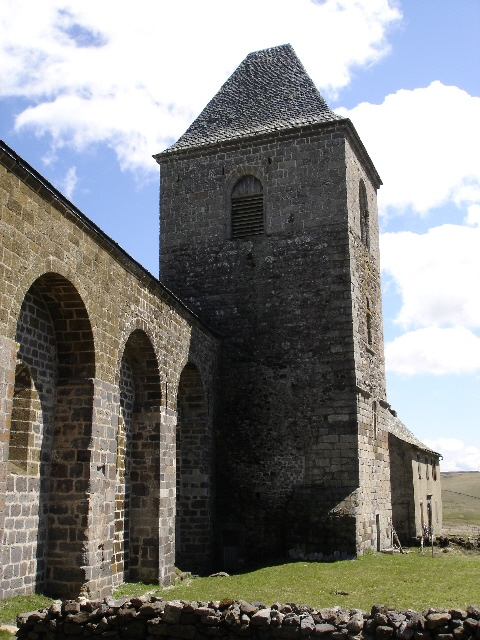
Aubrac (town): the Domerie.

By 1000 BC, the Celts had occupied the region. In the period of Roman Gaul, Gaulish tribes called Gabalians (Lozère) and Rutènians (Aveyron) occupied the area. Julius Caesar stated that the Gabalians were survivors of the Battle of Alesia. Their capital Anderitum became Javols. The Rutenians, who may have come from the Danube delta and who gave their name to the Rouergue, became allied with Vercingetorix.

In the early Middle Ages, Grégory of Tours recorded an incident of a Pagan rite at the lake near Mount Hélanus. Later, a pilgrim of St. James, Adallard (a Flemish viscount), survived after a fight in the area; out of gratitude to God he built the Dômerie (hospital) at Aubrac. The village of Aubrac grew around the hospital.

The Dômerie was home to monks and the knights of the Order of Aubrac until the French Revolution. The monks fed and sheltered passing pilgrims, and rang a "Bell of the Lost" during times of snow. The rules of life at the Dômerie in Latin dating from the Middle Ages are available in an online version.

In the 11th century, a certain Gilbert of Provence, who married Tiburge, countess of Provence, appointed himself count of Gévaudan. This Gilbert had a daughter, Douce I, Countess of Provence, who was married to Ramon Berenguer, Count of Barcelona, and brought him all the rights to Gévaudan, Aubrac, and Carladès.

The rule of the counts of Barcelona in Gévaudan gave rise to a serious argument with the bishop of Mende, who considered himself lord and count of the country. After many local conflicts and the war between the lords of Armagnac's French kings Charles VII and Louis XI this country lost its true identity. However, the pilgrim route to Santiago de Compostela has always brought many visitors.

== Culture ==
Every last weekend of August, a literary festival takes place in Aubrac: Rencontres aubrac

== Photo gallery ==
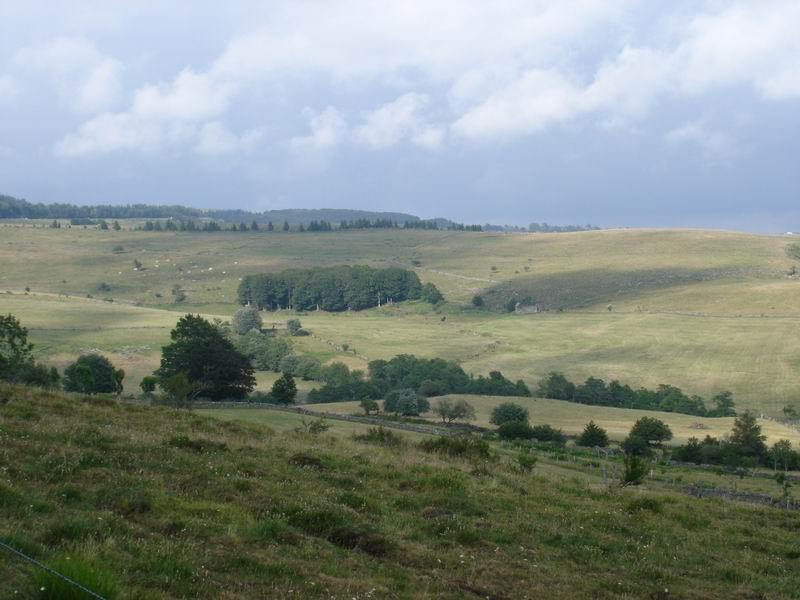
Aubrac landscape

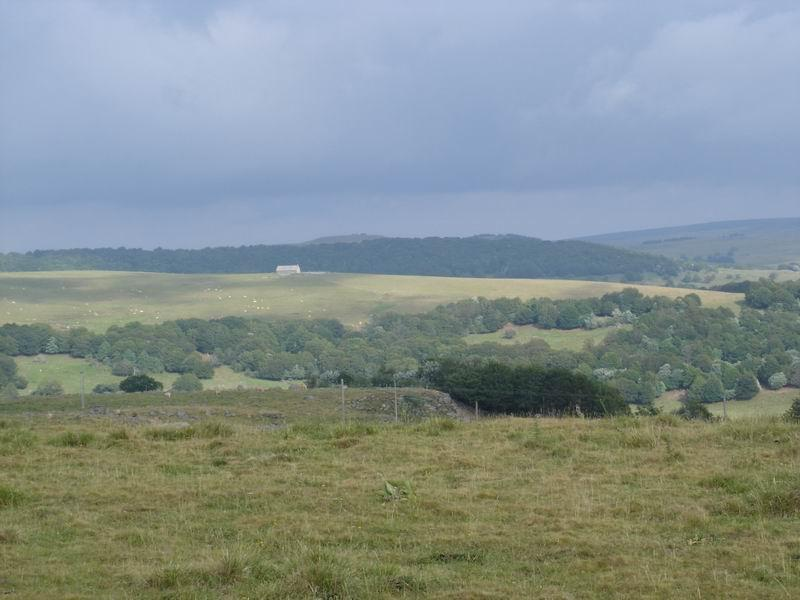
Aubrac landscape

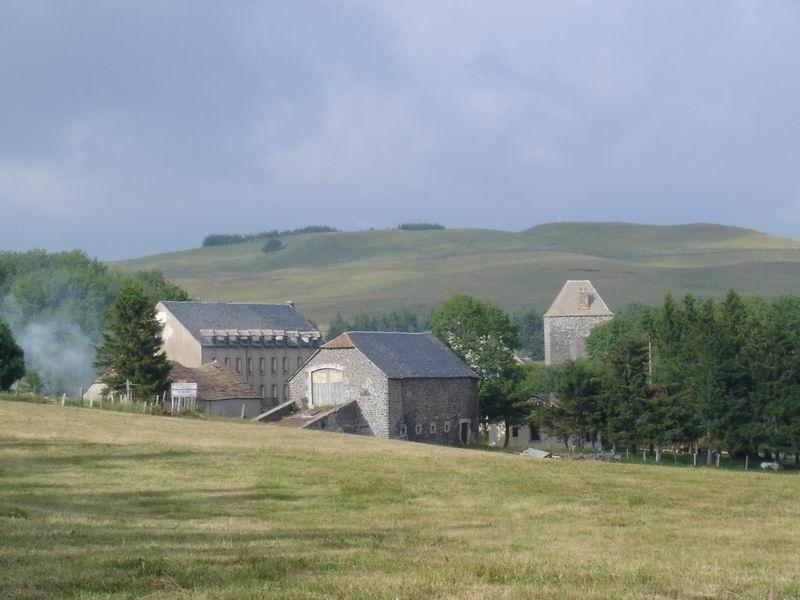
Aubrac town & country

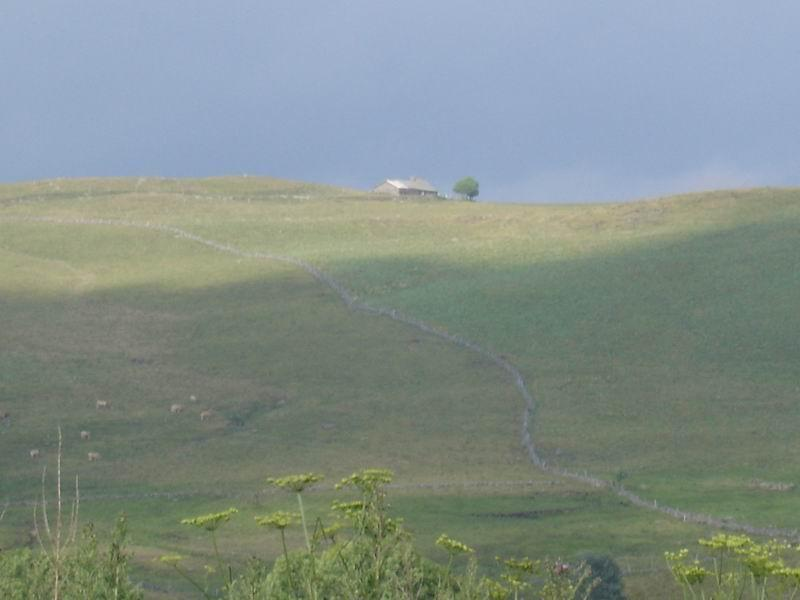
Aubrac landscape

== Settlements in the Aubrac Region ==
- Albaret-le-Comtal
- Alpuech
- Anterrieux
- Arzenc-d'Apcher
- Aurelle-Verlac
- Bonnefon
- Brameloup
- Brion
- Cassuéjouls
- Chauchailles
- Chaudes-Aigues
- La Chaze-de-Peyre
- Condom-d'Aubrac
- Curières
- Deux-Verges
- Espinasse
- Fau-de-Peyre
- Fournels
- Fridefont
- Grandvals
- Jabrun
- La Fage-Montivernoux
- La Trinitat
- Lacalm
- Laguiole
- Les Hermaux
- Les Salces
- Lieutadès
- Lunet
- Maurines
- Montézic
- Montpeyroux
- Noalhac
- Prades-d'Aubrac
- Prinsuéjols
- Recoules-d'Aubrac
- Saint-Juéry
- Saint-Chély-d'Aubrac
- Saint-Laurent-de-Muret
- Saint-Laurent-de-Veyrès
- Saint-Martial
- Sainte-Colombe-de-Peyre
- Saint-Rémy
- Saint-Urcize
- Salgues
- Soulages-Bonneval
- Termes
- Trélans
