= Arrondissement of Mende =

Coordinates: 44°31′00″N 3°30′07″E

Mende
- Arrondissement
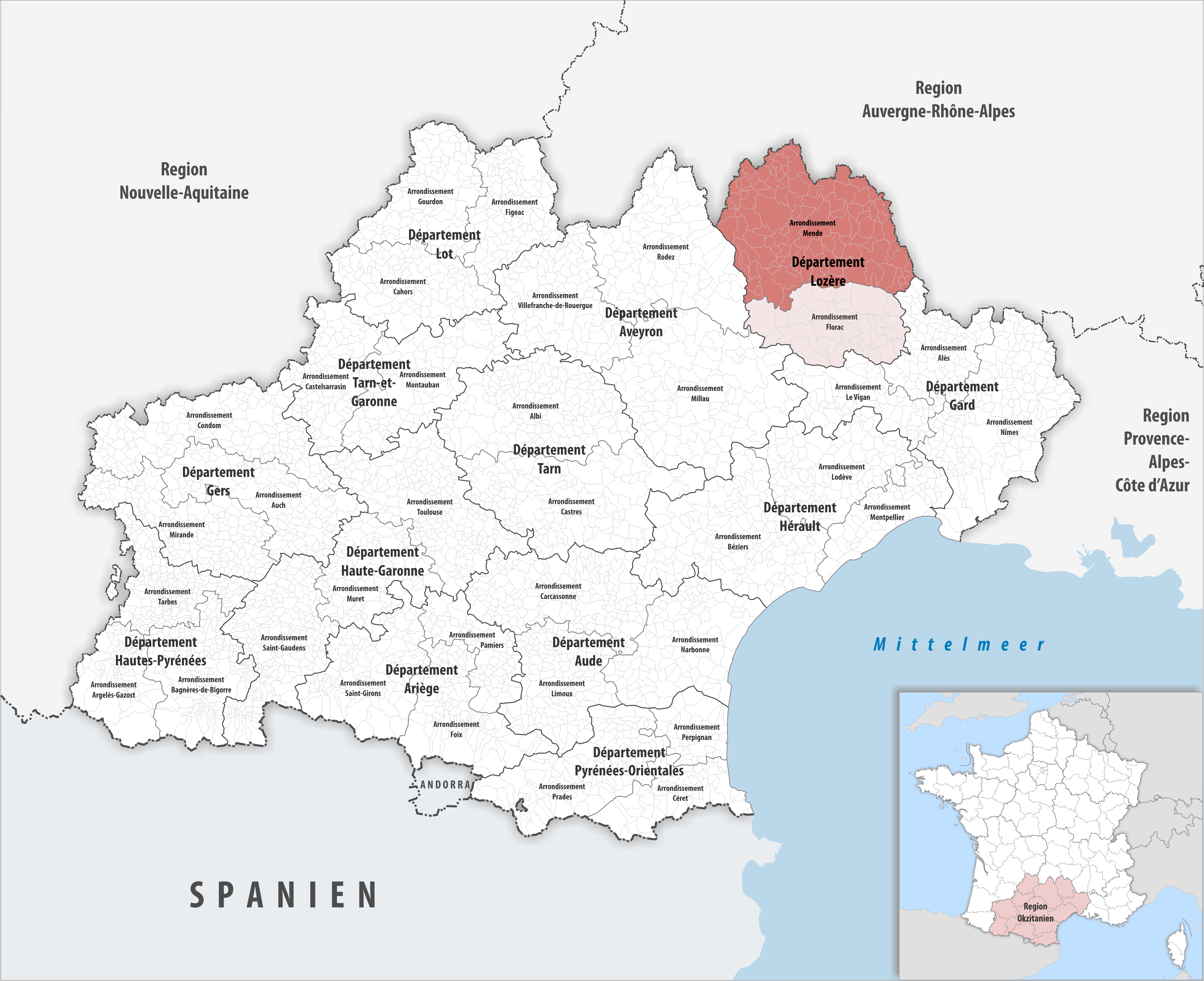
- Location within the region Occitanie
- Country: France
- Region: Occitania
- Department: Lozère
- No. of communes: {{{nbcomm}}}
- Area: 3,479.4 km^{2} (1,343.4 sq mi)
- Population (2023): 63,398
  - Density: 18.221/km^{2} (47.192/sq mi)
- INSEE code: 482

The arrondissement of Mende is an arrondissement of France in the Lozère department in the Occitanie région. Its INSEE code is 482 and its capital city, and prefecture of the department, is Mende. Its population is 63,491 (2021), and its area is 3,479.4 km^{2} (1,343.4 sq mi).

The only important city is Mende with 12,318 people living there in 2019. Other towns are Marvejols (4,684) and Saint-Chély-d'Apcher (4,211).

== Geography ==
The arrondissement covers the northern part of the department and is bordered to the north and east by the Auvergne-Rhône-Alpes region (the Cantal department to the northwest, the Haute-Loire department to the northeast and the Ardèche department to the east), to the south by the arrondissement of Florac and to the west by the Aveyron department.

== Composition ==
The arrondissement of Mende has 114 communes; they are (with their INSEE codes):

1. Albaret-le-Comtal (48001)
2. Albaret-Sainte-Marie (48002)
3. Allenc (48003)
4. Altier (48004)
5. Antrenas (48005)
6. Arzenc-d'Apcher (48007)
7. Arzenc-de-Randon (48008)
8. Auroux (48010)
9. Badaroux (48013)
10. Balsièges (48016)
11. Banassac-Canilhac (48017)
12. Barjac (48018)
13. La Bastide-Puylaurent (48021)
14. Bel-Air-Val-d'Ance (48038)
15. Les Bessons (48025)
16. Blavignac (48026)
17. Le Born (48029)
18. Bourgs sur Colagne (48099)
19. Brenoux (48030)
20. Brion (48031)
21. Le Buisson (48032)
22. La Canourgue (48034)
23. Chadenet (48037)
24. Chanac (48039)
25. Chastanier (48041)
26. Chastel-Nouvel (48042)
27. Châteauneuf-de-Randon (48043)
28. Chauchailles (48044)
29. Chaudeyrac (48045)
30. Chaulhac (48046)
31. Cheylard-l'Évêque (48048)
32. Cubières (48053)
33. Cubiérettes (48054)
34. Cultures (48055)
35. Esclanèdes (48056)
36. La Fage-Montivernoux (48058)
37. La Fage-Saint-Julien (48059)
38. Fontans (48063)
39. Fournels (48064)
40. Gabrias (48068)
41. Grandrieu (48070)
42. Grandvals (48071)
43. Grèzes (48072)
44. Les Hermaux (48073)
45. Julianges (48077)
46. Lachamp-Ribennes (48126)
47. Lajo (48079)
48. Langogne (48080)
49. Lanuéjols (48081)
50. Laubert (48082)
51. Les Laubies (48083)
52. Laval-du-Tarn (48085)
53. Luc (48086)
54. Le Malzieu-Forain (48089)
55. Le Malzieu-Ville (48090)
56. Marchastel (48091)
57. Marvejols (48092)
58. Mende (48095)
59. Montbel (48100)
60. Mont Lozère et Goulet (48027)
61. Montrodat (48103)
62. Monts-de-Randon (48127)
63. Les Monts-Verts (48012)
64. Nasbinals (48104)
65. Naussac-Fontanes (48105)
66. Noalhac (48106)
67. Palhers (48107)
68. La Panouse (48108)
69. Paulhac-en-Margeride (48110)
70. Pelouse (48111)
71. Peyre en Aubrac (48009)
72. Pied-de-Borne (48015)
73. Pierrefiche (48112)
74. Pourcharesses (48117)
75. Prévenchères (48119)
76. Prinsuéjols-Malbouzon (48087)
77. Prunières (48121)
78. Recoules-d'Aubrac (48123)
79. Recoules-de-Fumas (48124)
80. Rimeize (48128)
81. Rocles (48129)
82. Saint-Alban-sur-Limagnole (48132)
83. Saint-André-Capcèze (48135)
84. Saint-Bauzile (48137)
85. Saint-Bonnet-de-Chirac (48138)
86. Saint-Bonnet-Laval (48139)
87. Saint-Chély-d'Apcher (48140)
88. Saint-Denis-en-Margeride (48145)
89. Sainte-Eulalie (48149)
90. Sainte-Hélène (48157)
91. Saint-Étienne-du-Valdonnez (48147)
92. Saint-Flour-de-Mercoire (48150)
93. Saint-Frézal-d'Albuges (48151)
94. Saint-Gal (48153)
95. Saint-Germain-du-Teil (48156)
96. Saint-Jean-la-Fouillouse (48160)
97. Saint-Juéry (48161)
98. Saint-Laurent-de-Muret (48165)
99. Saint-Laurent-de-Veyrès (48167)
100. Saint-Léger-de-Peyre (48168)
101. Saint-Léger-du-Malzieu (48169)
102. Saint-Paul-le-Froid (48174)
103. Saint-Pierre-de-Nogaret (48175)
104. Saint-Pierre-le-Vieux (48177)
105. Saint-Privat-du-Fau (48179)
106. Saint-Saturnin (48181)
107. Saint-Sauveur-de-Ginestoux (48182)
108. Les Salces (48187)
109. Les Salelles (48185)
110. Serverette (48188)
111. Termes (48190)
112. La Tieule (48191)
113. Trélans (48192)
114. Villefort (48198)

== History ==
The arrondissement of Mende was created in 1800.

As a result of the reorganisation of the cantons of France which came into effect in 2015, the borders of the cantons are no longer related to the borders of the arrondissements. The cantons of the arrondissement of Mende were, as of January 2015:

1. Aumont-Aubrac
2. Le Bleymard
3. La Canourgue
4. Chanac
5. Châteauneuf-de-Randon
6. Fournels
7. Grandrieu
8. Langogne
9. Le Malzieu-Ville
10. Marvejols
11. Mende-Nord
12. Mende-Sud
13. Nasbinals
14. Saint-Alban-sur-Limagnole
15. Saint-Amans
16. Saint-Chély-d'Apcher
17. Saint-Germain-du-Teil
18. Villefort
