= Marchastel =

Marchastel is the name of two communes in France:

- Marchastel, Cantal, in the Cantal department
- Marchastel, Lozère, in the Lozère department
