= Saint-Juéry =

Saint-Juéry is the name of several communes in France:

- Saint-Juéry, Aveyron, in the Aveyron department
- Saint-Juéry, Lozère, in the Lozère department
- Saint-Juéry, Tarn, in the Tarn department

The name is derived from a corruption of "Saint Georges".
