= Laval-du-Tarn =

- Commune
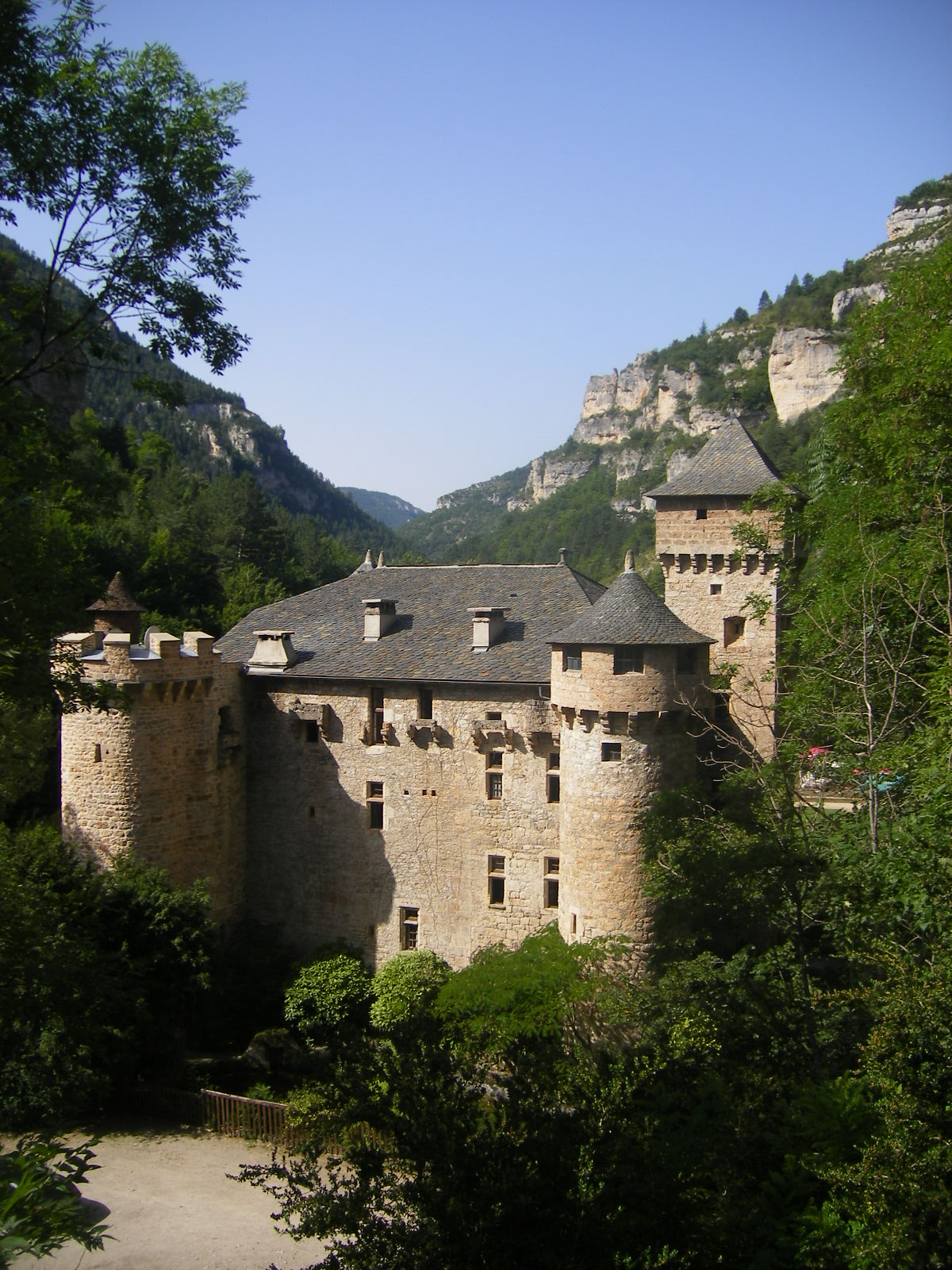
- The Château de la Caze, in Laval-du-Tarn
- Location of Laval-du-Tarn
- Location within France Location within Occitanie
- Coordinates: 44°21′17″N 3°21′15″E
- Country: France
- Region: Occitania
- Department: Lozère
- Arrondissement: Mende
- Canton: La Canourgue
- Intercommunality: Aubrac Lot Causses Tarn

Government
  - Mayor (2020–2026): Bernard Bonicel
- Area^{1}: 36.85 km^{2} (14.23 sq mi)
- Elevation: 810 m (2,660 ft)
- Highest elevation: 1,021 m (3,350 ft)
- Lowest elevation: 449 m (1,473 ft)
- Population (2023): 108
  - Density: 2.93/km^{2} (7.59/sq mi)
- Time zone: UTC+01:00 (CET)
  - Summer (DST): UTC+02:00 (CEST)
- INSEE/Postal code: 48085 /48500
- ^{1} French Land Register data, which excludes lakes, ponds, glaciers > 1 km^{2} (0.386 sq mi or 247 acres) and river estuaries.

Laval-du-Tarn (French pronunciation: [laval dy taʁn]; Occitan: La Val de Tarn) is a commune in the Lozère department in southern France.

== See also ==
- Communes of the Lozère department
