= Saint-Pierre-de-Nogaret =

- Commune
- Location of Saint-Pierre-de-Nogaret
- Location within France Location within Occitanie
- Coordinates: 44°28′23″N 3°08′17″E
- Country: France
- Region: Occitania
- Department: Lozère
- Arrondissement: Mende
- Canton: Peyre en Aubrac
- Intercommunality: Aubrac Lot Causses Tarn

Government
  - Mayor (2020–2026): Jean-Claude Cayrel
- Area^{1}: 16.44 km^{2} (6.35 sq mi)
- Elevation: 800 m (2,600 ft)
- Highest elevation: 1,251 m (4,104 ft)
- Lowest elevation: 509 m (1,670 ft)
- Population (2023): 174
  - Density: 10.6/km^{2} (27.4/sq mi)
- Time zone: UTC+01:00 (CET)
  - Summer (DST): UTC+02:00 (CEST)
- INSEE/Postal code: 48175 /48340
- ^{1} French Land Register data, which excludes lakes, ponds, glaciers > 1 km^{2} (0.386 sq mi or 247 acres) and river estuaries.

Saint-Pierre-de-Nogaret (French pronunciation: [sɛ̃ pjɛʁ də nɔɡaʁɛ]; Occitan: Sant Pèire de Nogaret) is a commune in the Lozère department in southern France.

== Notable people ==
It was the birthplace of Jean-Antoine Chaptal (1756-1832), chemist and statesman.

== See also ==
- Communes of the Lozère department
