= Les Laubies =

- Commune
- Coat of arms
- Location of Les Laubies
- Location within France Location within Occitanie
- Coordinates: 44°41′12″N 3°25′49″E
- Country: France
- Region: Occitania
- Department: Lozère
- Arrondissement: Mende
- Canton: Saint-Alban-sur-Limagnole
- Intercommunality: CC Randon - Margeride

Government
  - Mayor (2023–2026): Aurélie Malaval
- Area^{1}: 22.80 km^{2} (8.80 sq mi)
- Elevation: 1,028 m (3,373 ft)
- Highest elevation: 1,388 m (4,554 ft)
- Lowest elevation: 1,010 m (3,310 ft)
- Population (2023): 151
  - Density: 6.62/km^{2} (17.2/sq mi)
- Time zone: UTC+01:00 (CET)
  - Summer (DST): UTC+02:00 (CEST)
- INSEE/Postal code: 48083 /48700
- ^{1} French Land Register data, which excludes lakes, ponds, glaciers > 1 km^{2} (0.386 sq mi or 247 acres) and river estuaries.

Les Laubies (French pronunciation: [le lobi]; Occitan: Las Làubias) is a commune in the Lozère department in southern France.

== See also ==
- Communes of the Lozère department
