= La Tieule =

- Commune
- Location of La Tieule
- Location within France Location within Occitanie
- Coordinates: 44°23′05″N 3°09′26″E
- Country: France
- Region: Occitania
- Department: Lozère
- Arrondissement: Mende
- Canton: La Canourgue
- Intercommunality: Aubrac Lot Causses Tarn

Government
  - Mayor (2020–2026): Emmanuel Castan
- Area^{1}: 24.00 km^{2} (9.27 sq mi)
- Elevation: 900 m (3,000 ft)
- Highest elevation: 1,018 m (3,340 ft)
- Lowest elevation: 660 m (2,170 ft)
- Population (2023): 94
  - Density: 3.9/km^{2} (10/sq mi)
- Time zone: UTC+01:00 (CET)
  - Summer (DST): UTC+02:00 (CEST)
- INSEE/Postal code: 48191 /48500
- ^{1} French Land Register data, which excludes lakes, ponds, glaciers > 1 km^{2} (0.386 sq mi or 247 acres) and river estuaries.

La Tieule (French pronunciation: [la tjœl]; Occitan: La Tieule) is a commune in the Lozère department in southern France.

== See also ==
- Communes of the Lozère department
