= Sainte-Eulalie, Lozère =

Sainte-Eulalie
- Commune
- Coat of arms
- Location of Sainte-Eulalie
- Location within France Location within Occitanie
- Coordinates: 44°47′30″N 3°28′03″E
- Country: France
- Region: Occitania
- Department: Lozère
- Arrondissement: Mende
- Canton: Saint-Alban-sur-Limagnole
- Intercommunality: Terres d'Apcher-Margeride-Aubrac

Government
  - Mayor (2020–2026): Christian Meyrand
- Area^{1}: 21.31 km^{2} (8.23 sq mi)
- Elevation: 1,250 m (4,100 ft)
- Highest elevation: 1,454 m (4,770 ft)
- Lowest elevation: 1,153 m (3,783 ft)
- Population (2023): 37
  - Density: 1.7/km^{2} (4.5/sq mi)
- Time zone: UTC+01:00 (CET)
  - Summer (DST): UTC+02:00 (CEST)
- INSEE/Postal code: 48149 /48120
- ^{1} French Land Register data, which excludes lakes, ponds, glaciers > 1 km^{2} (0.386 sq mi or 247 acres) and river estuaries.

Sainte-Eulalie (French pronunciation: [sɛ̃t ølali]; Occitan: Senta Aulàsia) is a commune in the Lozère department in southern France.

== See also ==
- Communes of the Lozère department
