= Saint-Laurent-de-Muret =

- Commune
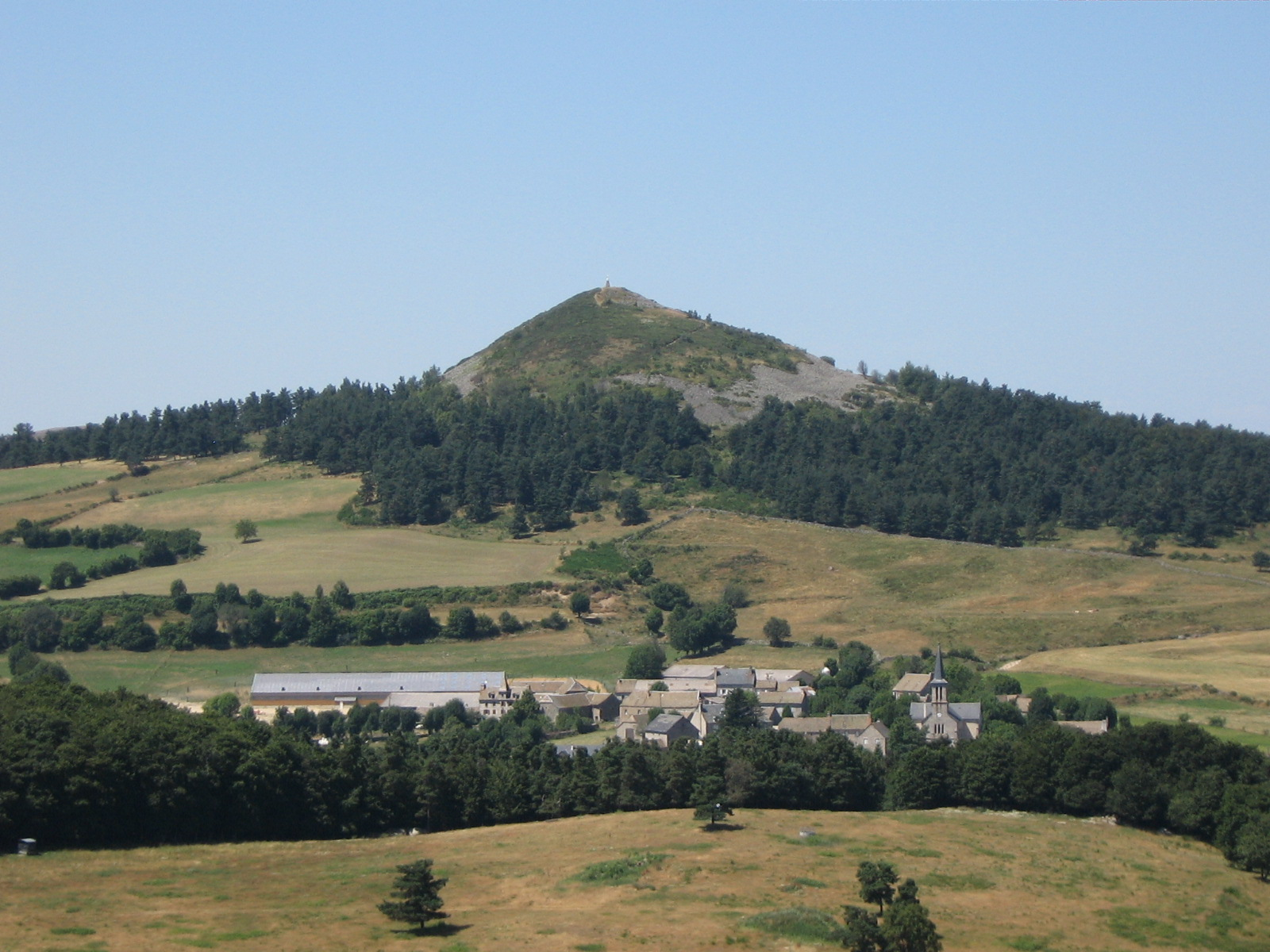
- Saint-Laurent-de-Muret and the Pic de Mus
- Location of Saint-Laurent-de-Muret
- Location within France Location within Occitanie
- Coordinates: 44°36′11″N 3°12′27″E
- Country: France
- Region: Occitania
- Department: Lozère
- Arrondissement: Mende
- Canton: Peyre en Aubrac
- Intercommunality: Gévaudan

Government
  - Mayor (2020–2026): Pierre Rey
- Area^{1}: 46.04 km^{2} (17.78 sq mi)
- Elevation: 1,120 m (3,670 ft)
- Highest elevation: 1,381 m (4,531 ft)
- Lowest elevation: 976 m (3,202 ft)
- Population (2023): 193
  - Density: 4.19/km^{2} (10.9/sq mi)
- Time zone: UTC+01:00 (CET)
  - Summer (DST): UTC+02:00 (CEST)
- INSEE/Postal code: 48165 /48100
- ^{1} French Land Register data, which excludes lakes, ponds, glaciers > 1 km^{2} (0.386 sq mi or 247 acres) and river estuaries.

Saint-Laurent-de-Muret (French pronunciation: [sɛ̃ loʁɑ̃ də myʁɛ]; Occitan: Sant Laurenç de Muret) is a commune in the Lozère department in southern France. It is located on the east of the Aubrac region (Massif central).

== See also ==
- Communes of the Lozère department
