= Serverette =

- Commune
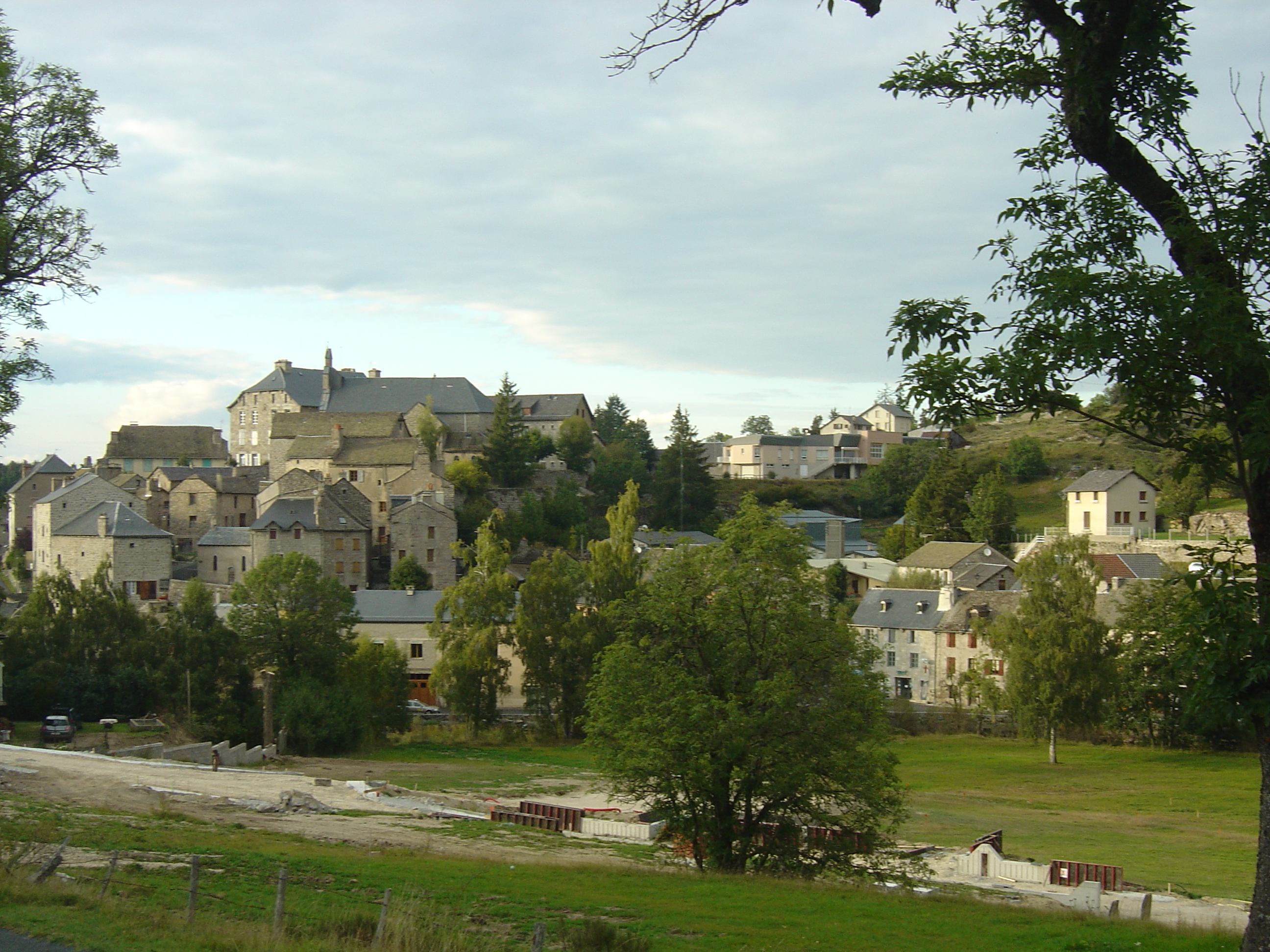
- A general view of Serverette

- Coat of arms
- Location of Serverette
- Location within France Location within Occitanie
- Coordinates: 44°42′18″N 3°23′12″E
- Country: France
- Region: Occitania
- Department: Lozère
- Arrondissement: Mende
- Canton: Saint-Alban-sur-Limagnole
- Intercommunality: Terres d'Apcher-Margeride-Aubrac

Government
  - Mayor (2020–2026): Séverine Cornut
- Area^{1}: 17.35 km^{2} (6.70 sq mi)
- Elevation: 976 m (3,202 ft)
- Highest elevation: 1,106 m (3,629 ft)
- Lowest elevation: 959 m (3,146 ft)
- Population (2023): 261
  - Density: 15.0/km^{2} (39.0/sq mi)
- Time zone: UTC+01:00 (CET)
  - Summer (DST): UTC+02:00 (CEST)
- INSEE/Postal code: 48188 /48700
- ^{1} French Land Register data, which excludes lakes, ponds, glaciers > 1 km^{2} (0.386 sq mi or 247 acres) and river estuaries.

Serverette (French pronunciation: [sɛʁvəʁɛt]; Occitan: Cerveireta) is a commune in the Lozère department in southern France.

== See also ==
- Communes of the Lozère department
