= Saint-Denis-en-Margeride =

- Commune
- Location of Saint-Denis-en-Margeride
- Location within France Location within Occitanie
- Coordinates: 44°44′11″N 3°28′21″E
- Country: France
- Region: Occitania
- Department: Lozère
- Arrondissement: Mende
- Canton: Saint-Alban-sur-Limagnole
- Intercommunality: CC Randon - Margeride

Government
  - Mayor (2020–2026): Jean-Paul Meynier
- Area^{1}: 38.67 km^{2} (14.93 sq mi)
- Elevation: 1,175 m (3,855 ft)
- Highest elevation: 1,485 m (4,872 ft)
- Lowest elevation: 995 m (3,264 ft)
- Population (2023): 148
  - Density: 3.83/km^{2} (9.91/sq mi)
- Time zone: UTC+01:00 (CET)
  - Summer (DST): UTC+02:00 (CEST)
- INSEE/Postal code: 48145 /48700
- ^{1} French Land Register data, which excludes lakes, ponds, glaciers > 1 km^{2} (0.386 sq mi or 247 acres) and river estuaries.

Saint-Denis-en-Margeride (Occitan: Sent Daunís de Marjarida) is a commune in the Lozère department in southern France.

== See also ==
- Communes of the Lozère department
- Col de la Baraque des Bouviers
