= Les Bessons =

- Commune
- Location of Les Bessons
- Location within France Location within Occitanie
- Coordinates: 44°46′24″N 3°15′14″E
- Country: France
- Region: Occitania
- Department: Lozère
- Arrondissement: Mende
- Canton: Peyre en Aubrac
- Intercommunality: Terres d'Apcher-Margeride-Aubrac

Government
  - Mayor (2020–2026): René Tardieu
- Area^{1}: 23.49 km^{2} (9.07 sq mi)
- Elevation: 1,050 m (3,440 ft)
- Highest elevation: 1,274 m (4,180 ft)
- Lowest elevation: 972 m (3,189 ft)
- Population (2023): 421
  - Density: 17.9/km^{2} (46.4/sq mi)
- Time zone: UTC+01:00 (CET)
  - Summer (DST): UTC+02:00 (CEST)
- INSEE/Postal code: 48025 /48200
- ^{1} French Land Register data, which excludes lakes, ponds, glaciers > 1 km^{2} (0.386 sq mi or 247 acres) and river estuaries.

Les Bessons (Occitan: Los Bessons) is a commune in the Lozère department in southern France.

== Population ==
Historical population
Year	Pop.	±% p.a.
1968	342	—
1975	325	−0.73%
1982	335	+0.43%
1990	273	−2.53%
1999	361	+3.15%
2007	447	+2.71%
2012	436	−0.50%
2017	440	+0.18%
2023	421	−0.73%
Source: INSEE

== See also ==
- Communes of the Lozère department
