= Communes of the Lozère department =

The following is a list of the 152 communes of the Lozère department of France.

The communes cooperate in the following intercommunalities (as of 2025):

- Communauté de communes Aubrac Lot Causses Tarn
- Communauté de communes Des Cévennes au Mont Lozère
- Communauté de communes Cœur de Lozère
- Communauté de communes du Gévaudan
- Communauté de communes Gorges Causses Cévennes
- Communauté de communes du Haut Allier Margeride
- Communauté de communes des Hautes Terres de l'Aubrac
- Communauté de communes de Millau Grands Causses (partly)
- Communauté de communes Mont-Lozère (partly)
- Communauté de communes Randon - Margeride
- Communauté de communes des Terres d'Apcher-Margeride-Aubrac

INSEE	Postal	Commune
48001	48310	Albaret-le-Comtal
48002	48200	Albaret-Sainte-Marie
48003	48190	Allenc
48004	48800	Altier
48005	48100	Antrenas
48007	48310	Arzenc-d'Apcher
48008	48170	Arzenc-de-Randon
48010	48600	Auroux
48013	48000	Badaroux
48016	48000	Balsièges
48017	48500	Banassac-Canilhac
48018	48000	Barjac
48019	48400	Barre-des-Cévennes
48020	48400	Bassurels
48021	48250	La Bastide-Puylaurent
48050	48400	Bédouès-Cocurès
48038	48600	Bel-Air-Val-d'Ance
48025	48200	Les Bessons
48026	48200	Blavignac
48028	48400	Les Bondons
48029	48000	Le Born
48099	48100	Bourgs sur Colagne
48030	48000	Brenoux
48031	48310	Brion
48032	48100	Le Buisson
48034	48500	La Canourgue
48166	48400	Cans-et-Cévennes
48036	48400	Cassagnas
48037	48190	Chadenet
48039	48230	Chanac
48041	48300	Chastanier
48042	48000	Chastel-Nouvel
48043	48170	Châteauneuf-de-Randon
48044	48310	Chauchailles
48045	48170	Chaudeyrac
48046	48140	Chaulhac
48048	48300	Cheylard-l'Évêque
48051	48160	Le Collet-de-Dèze
48053	48190	Cubières
48054	48190	Cubiérettes
48055	48230	Cultures
48056	48230	Esclanèdes
48058	48310	La Fage-Montivernoux
48059	48200	La Fage-Saint-Julien
48061	48400	Florac Trois Rivières
48063	48700	Fontans
48064	48310	Fournels
48065	48400	Fraissinet-de-Fourques
48067	48110	Gabriac
48068	48100	Gabrias
48069	48150	Gatuzières
48146	48210	Gorges du Tarn Causses
48070	48600	Grandrieu
48071	48260	Grandvals
48072	48100	Grèzes
48073	48340	Les Hermaux
48074	48150	Hures-la-Parade
48075	48320	Ispagnac
48077	48140	Julianges
48126	48100	Lachamp-Ribennes
48079	48120	Lajo
48080	48300	Langogne
48081	48000	Lanuéjols
48082	48170	Laubert
48083	48700	Les Laubies
48085	48500	Laval-du-Tarn
48086	48250	Luc
48088	48210	La Malène
48089	48140	Le Malzieu-Forain
48090	48140	Le Malzieu-Ville
48091	48260	Marchastel
48092	48100	Marvejols
48141	48210	Mas-Saint-Chély
48094	48500	Massegros Causses Gorges
48095	48000	Mende
48096	48150	Meyrueis
48097	48110	Moissac-Vallée-Française
48098	48110	Molezon

INSEE	Postal	Commune
48100	48170	Montbel
48027	48190	Mont Lozère et Goulet
48103	48100	Montrodat
48127	48700	Monts-de-Randon
48012	48200	Les Monts-Verts
48104	48260	Nasbinals
48105	48300	Naussac-Fontanes
48106	48310	Noalhac
48107	48100	Palhers
48108	48600	La Panouse
48110	48140	Paulhac-en-Margeride
48111	48000	Pelouse
48009	48130	Peyre en Aubrac
48015	48800	Pied-de-Borne
48112	48300	Pierrefiche
48115	48110	Le Pompidou
48116	48220	Pont-de-Montvert-Sud-Mont-Lozère
48117	48800	Pourcharesses
48119	48800	Prévenchères
48087	48270	Prinsuéjols-Malbouzon
48121	48200	Prunières
48123	48260	Recoules-d'Aubrac
48124	48100	Recoules-de-Fumas
48128	48200	Rimeize
48129	48300	Rocles
48130	48400	Rousses
48131	48150	Le Rozier
48132	48120	Saint-Alban-sur-Limagnole
48135	48800	Saint-André-Capcèze
48136	48240	Saint-André-de-Lancize
48137	48000	Saint-Bauzile
48138	48100	Saint-Bonnet-de-Chirac
48139	48600	Saint-Bonnet-Laval
48140	48200	Saint-Chély-d'Apcher
48145	48700	Saint-Denis-en-Margeride
48144	48110	Sainte-Croix-Vallée-Française
48149	48120	Sainte-Eulalie
48157	48190	Sainte-Hélène
48147	48000	Saint-Étienne-du-Valdonnez
48148	48330	Saint-Étienne-Vallée-Française
48150	48300	Saint-Flour-de-Mercoire
48151	48170	Saint-Frézal-d'Albuges
48153	48700	Saint-Gal
48155	48370	Saint-Germain-de-Calberte
48156	48340	Saint-Germain-du-Teil
48158	48160	Saint-Hilaire-de-Lavit
48160	48170	Saint-Jean-la-Fouillouse
48161	48310	Saint-Juéry
48163	48160	Saint-Julien-des-Points
48165	48100	Saint-Laurent-de-Muret
48167	48310	Saint-Laurent-de-Veyrès
48168	48100	Saint-Léger-de-Peyre
48169	48140	Saint-Léger-du-Malzieu
48170	48160	Saint-Martin-de-Boubaux
48171	48110	Saint-Martin-de-Lansuscle
48173	48160	Saint-Michel-de-Dèze
48174	48600	Saint-Paul-le-Froid
48175	48340	Saint-Pierre-de-Nogaret
48176	48150	Saint-Pierre-des-Tripiers
48177	48200	Saint-Pierre-le-Vieux
48178	48240	Saint-Privat-de-Vallongue
48179	48140	Saint-Privat-du-Fau
48181	48500	Saint-Saturnin
48182	48170	Saint-Sauveur-de-Ginestoux
48187	48100	Les Salces
48185	48230	Les Salelles
48188	48700	Serverette
48190	48310	Termes
48191	48500	La Tieule
48192	48340	Trélans
48193	48400	Vebron
48152	48240	Ventalon-en-Cévennes
48194	48220	Vialas
48198	48800	Villefort
