= Chastanier =

- Commune
- Coat of arms
- Location of Chastanier
- Location within France Location within Occitanie
- Coordinates: 44°43′34″N 3°45′19″E
- Country: France
- Region: Occitania
- Department: Lozère
- Arrondissement: Mende
- Canton: Langogne
- Intercommunality: CC Haut Allier Margeride

Government
  - Mayor (2020–2026): Guy Odoul
- Area^{1}: 10.41 km^{2} (4.02 sq mi)
- Elevation: 1,040 m (3,410 ft)
- Highest elevation: 1,169 m (3,835 ft)
- Lowest elevation: 952 m (3,123 ft)
- Population (2023): 76
  - Density: 7.3/km^{2} (19/sq mi)
- Time zone: UTC+01:00 (CET)
  - Summer (DST): UTC+02:00 (CEST)
- INSEE/Postal code: 48041 /48300
- ^{1} French Land Register data, which excludes lakes, ponds, glaciers > 1 km^{2} (0.386 sq mi or 247 acres) and river estuaries.

Chastanier is a village and commune in the Lozère department in southern France.

== Population ==
Historical population

Year	Pop.	±% p.a.
1793	250	—
1821	240	−0.15%
1846	258	+0.29%
1872	261	+0.04%
1901	257	−0.05%
1926	288	+0.46%
1946	206	−1.66%
1962	169	−1.23%
1968	140	−3.09%

Year	Pop.	±% p.a.
1975	118	−2.41%
1982	106	−1.52%
1990	113	+0.80%
1999	89	−2.62%
2007	92	+0.42%
2012	94	+0.43%
2017	78	−3.66%
2023	76	−0.43%

Source: Cassini and INSEE

== Geography ==
The Chapeauroux forms part of the commune's south-western border, flows northward through the middle of the commune, then forms part of its north-western border. Good place for fishing and enjoy outdoor sports such as VTT and running.

== See also ==
- Communes of the Lozère department
