= La Fage-Saint-Julien =

- Commune
- Location of La Fage-Saint-Julien
- Location within France Location within Occitanie
- Coordinates: 44°48′14″N 3°11′31″E
- Country: France
- Region: Occitania
- Department: Lozère
- Arrondissement: Mende
- Canton: Peyre en Aubrac
- Intercommunality: Terres d'Apcher-Margeride-Aubrac

Government
  - Mayor (2020–2026): Francis Sartre
- Area^{1}: 18.06 km^{2} (6.97 sq mi)
- Elevation: 1,000 m (3,300 ft)
- Highest elevation: 1,234 m (4,049 ft)
- Lowest elevation: 1,032 m (3,386 ft)
- Population (2023): 303
  - Density: 16.8/km^{2} (43.5/sq mi)
- Time zone: UTC+01:00 (CET)
  - Summer (DST): UTC+02:00 (CEST)
- INSEE/Postal code: 48059 /48200
- ^{1} French Land Register data, which excludes lakes, ponds, glaciers > 1 km^{2} (0.386 sq mi or 247 acres) and river estuaries.

La Fage-Saint-Julien (French pronunciation: [la faʒ sɛ̃ ʒyljɛ̃]; Occitan: La Fageta) is a commune in the Lozère department in southern France.

== See also ==
- Communes of the Lozère department
