= Pelouse =

- Commune
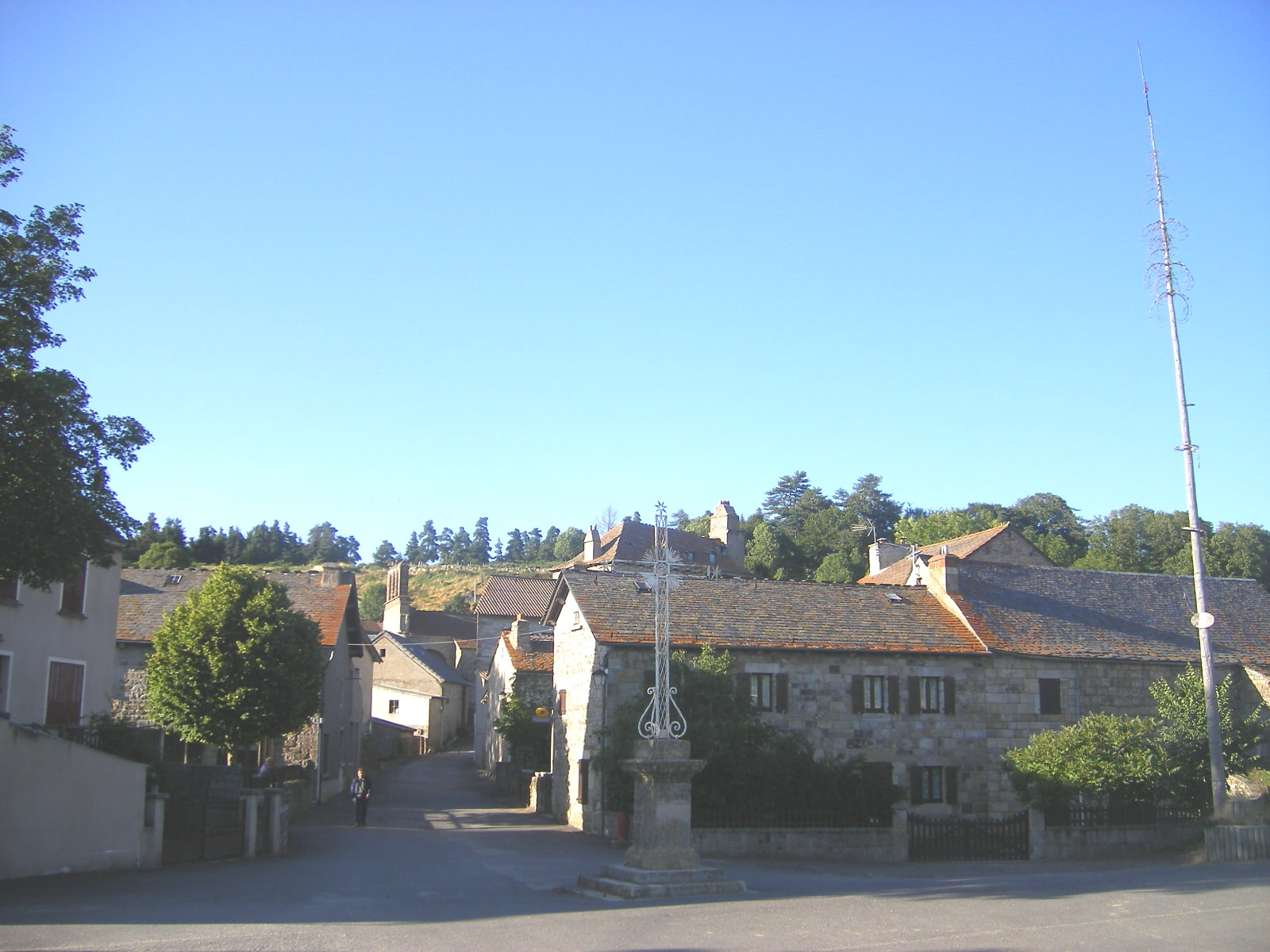
- A view within Pelouse

- Coat of arms
- Location of Pelouse
- Location within France Location within Occitanie
- Coordinates: 44°34′10″N 3°37′03″E
- Country: France
- Region: Occitania
- Department: Lozère
- Arrondissement: Mende
- Canton: Grandrieu
- Intercommunality: CC Cœur de Lozère

Government
  - Mayor (2020–2026): Laurent Toiron
- Area^{1}: 32.98 km^{2} (12.73 sq mi)
- Elevation: 1,115 m (3,658 ft)
- Highest elevation: 1,431 m (4,695 ft)
- Lowest elevation: 859 m (2,818 ft)
- Population (2023): 231
  - Density: 7.00/km^{2} (18.1/sq mi)
- Time zone: UTC+01:00 (CET)
  - Summer (DST): UTC+02:00 (CEST)
- INSEE/Postal code: 48111 /48000
- ^{1} French Land Register data, which excludes lakes, ponds, glaciers > 1 km^{2} (0.386 sq mi or 247 acres) and river estuaries.

Pelouse (French pronunciation: [pəluz]; Occitan: Pelosa) is a commune in the Lozère département in southern France.

== Geography ==
The Colagne forms part of the commune's northern border.

== See also ==
- Communes of the Lozère department
