= Le Buisson, Lozère =

Le Buisson
- Commune
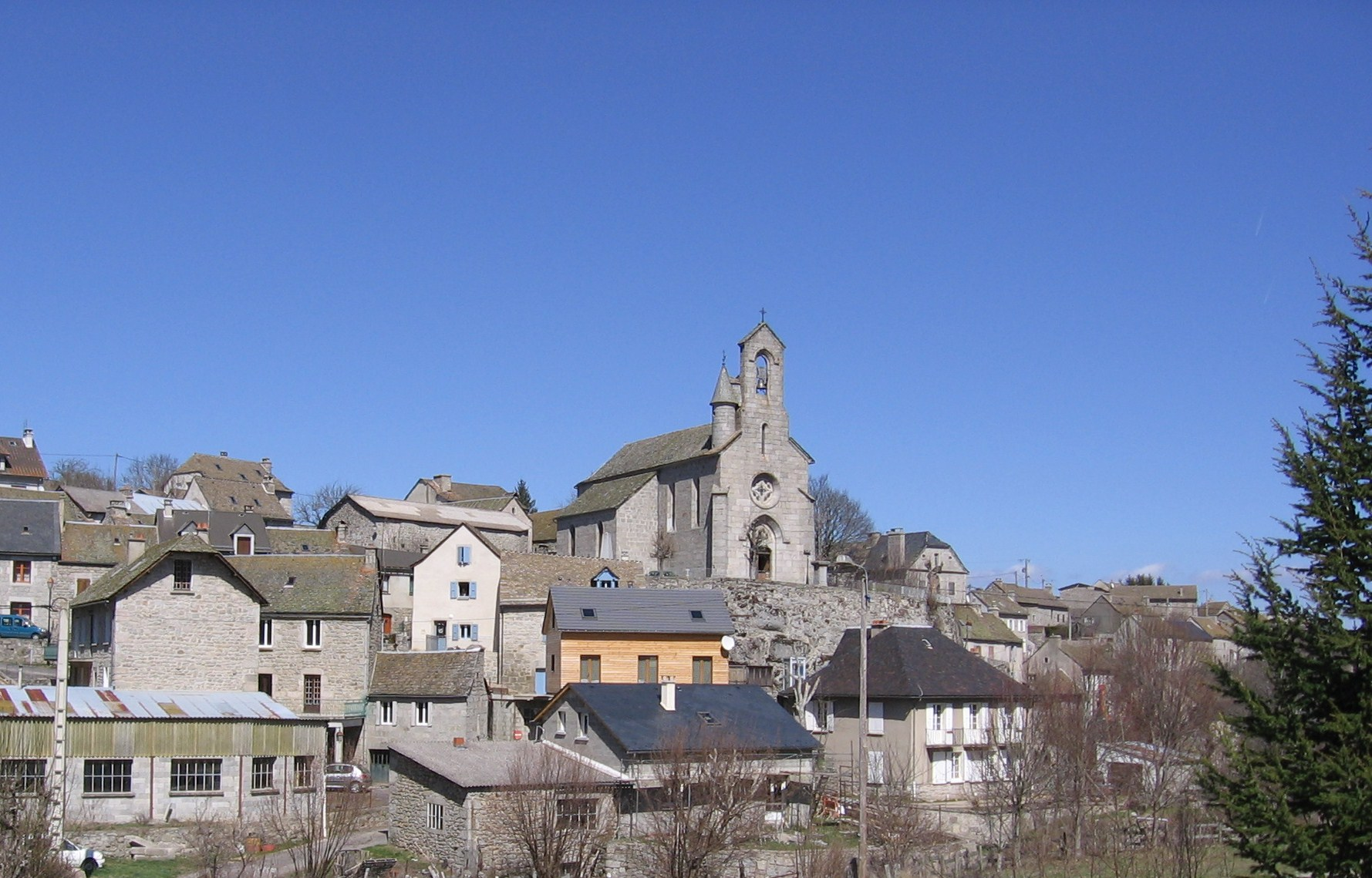
- The church in Le Buisson
- Location of Le Buisson
- Location within France Location within Occitanie
- Coordinates: 44°37′42″N 3°14′08″E
- Country: France
- Region: Occitania
- Department: Lozère
- Arrondissement: Mende
- Canton: Peyre en Aubrac
- Intercommunality: Gévaudan

Government
  - Mayor (2020–2026): Vincent Remise
- Area^{1}: 24.45 km^{2} (9.44 sq mi)
- Elevation: 1,050 m (3,440 ft)
- Highest elevation: 1,288 m (4,226 ft)
- Lowest elevation: 880 m (2,890 ft)
- Population (2023): 221
  - Density: 9.04/km^{2} (23.4/sq mi)
- Time zone: UTC+01:00 (CET)
  - Summer (DST): UTC+02:00 (CEST)
- INSEE/Postal code: 48032 /48100
- ^{1} French Land Register data, which excludes lakes, ponds, glaciers > 1 km^{2} (0.386 sq mi or 247 acres) and river estuaries.

Le Buisson (French pronunciation: [lə bɥisɔ̃]; Occitan: Lo Boisson) is a commune in the Lozère department in southern France.

== Population ==
Historical population
Year	Pop.	±% p.a.
1968	265	—
1975	220	−2.62%
1982	224	+0.26%
1990	188	−2.17%
1999	210	+1.24%
2007	207	−0.18%
2012	238	+2.83%
2017	224	−1.21%
2023	221	−0.22%
Source: INSEE

== See also ==
- Communes of the Lozère department
