= Antrenas =

- Commune
- Location of Antrenas
- Location within France Location within Occitanie
- Coordinates: 44°34′57″N 3°15′56″E
- Country: France
- Region: Occitania
- Department: Lozère
- Arrondissement: Mende
- Canton: Marvejols
- Intercommunality: Gévaudan

Government
  - Mayor (2020–2026): Gilbert Fontugne
- Area^{1}: 17.55 km^{2} (6.78 sq mi)
- Elevation: 852 m (2,795 ft)
- Highest elevation: 1,183 m (3,881 ft)
- Lowest elevation: 720 m (2,360 ft)
- Population (2023): 331
  - Density: 18.9/km^{2} (48.8/sq mi)
- Time zone: UTC+01:00 (CET)
  - Summer (DST): UTC+02:00 (CEST)
- INSEE/Postal code: 48005 /48100
- ^{1} French Land Register data, which excludes lakes, ponds, glaciers > 1 km^{2} (0.386 sq mi or 247 acres) and river estuaries.

Antrenas is a commune in the Lozère department in southern France.

== Population ==
Historical population
Year	Pop.	±% p.a.
1968	246	—
1975	220	−1.58%
1982	233	+0.82%
1990	274	+2.05%
1999	303	+1.12%
2007	314	+0.45%
2012	336	+1.36%
2017	331	−0.30%
2023	331	+0.00%
Source: INSEE

== See also ==
- Communes of the Lozère department
