= Cubiérettes =

- Commune
- Location of Cubiérettes
- Location within France Location within Occitanie
- Coordinates: 44°27′36″N 3°47′16″E
- Country: France
- Region: Occitania
- Department: Lozère
- Arrondissement: Mende
- Canton: Saint-Étienne-du-Valdonnez
- Intercommunality: CC Mont Lozère

Government
  - Mayor (2020–2026): Christian Benoit
- Area^{1}: 11.34 km^{2} (4.38 sq mi)
- Elevation: 930 m (3,050 ft)
- Highest elevation: 1,625 m (5,331 ft)
- Lowest elevation: 960 m (3,150 ft)
- Population (2023): 44
  - Density: 3.9/km^{2} (10/sq mi)
- Time zone: UTC+01:00 (CET)
  - Summer (DST): UTC+02:00 (CEST)
- INSEE/Postal code: 48054 /48190
- ^{1} French Land Register data, which excludes lakes, ponds, glaciers > 1 km^{2} (0.386 sq mi or 247 acres) and river estuaries.

Cubiérettes (French pronunciation: [kybjeʁɛt]; Occitan: Cubièireta) is a commune in the Lozère department in southern France.

== See also ==
- Communes of the Lozère department
