= Julianges =

- Commune
- Location of Julianges
- Location within France Location within Occitanie
- Coordinates: 44°55′51″N 3°18′35″E
- Country: France
- Region: Occitania
- Department: Lozère
- Arrondissement: Mende
- Canton: Saint-Alban-sur-Limagnole
- Intercommunality: Terres d'Apcher-Margeride-Aubrac

Government
  - Mayor (2020–2026): Thierry Archer
- Area^{1}: 9.42 km^{2} (3.64 sq mi)
- Elevation: 1,014 m (3,327 ft)
- Highest elevation: 1,340 m (4,400 ft)
- Lowest elevation: 891 m (2,923 ft)
- Population (2023): 50
  - Density: 5.3/km^{2} (14/sq mi)
- Time zone: UTC+01:00 (CET)
  - Summer (DST): UTC+02:00 (CEST)
- INSEE/Postal code: 48077 /48140
- ^{1} French Land Register data, which excludes lakes, ponds, glaciers > 1 km^{2} (0.386 sq mi or 247 acres) and river estuaries.

Julianges (French pronunciation: [ʒyljɑ̃ʒ]; Occitan: Julhanjas) is a commune in the Lozère department in southern France.

== See also ==
- Communes of the Lozère department
