= Cubières =

- Commune
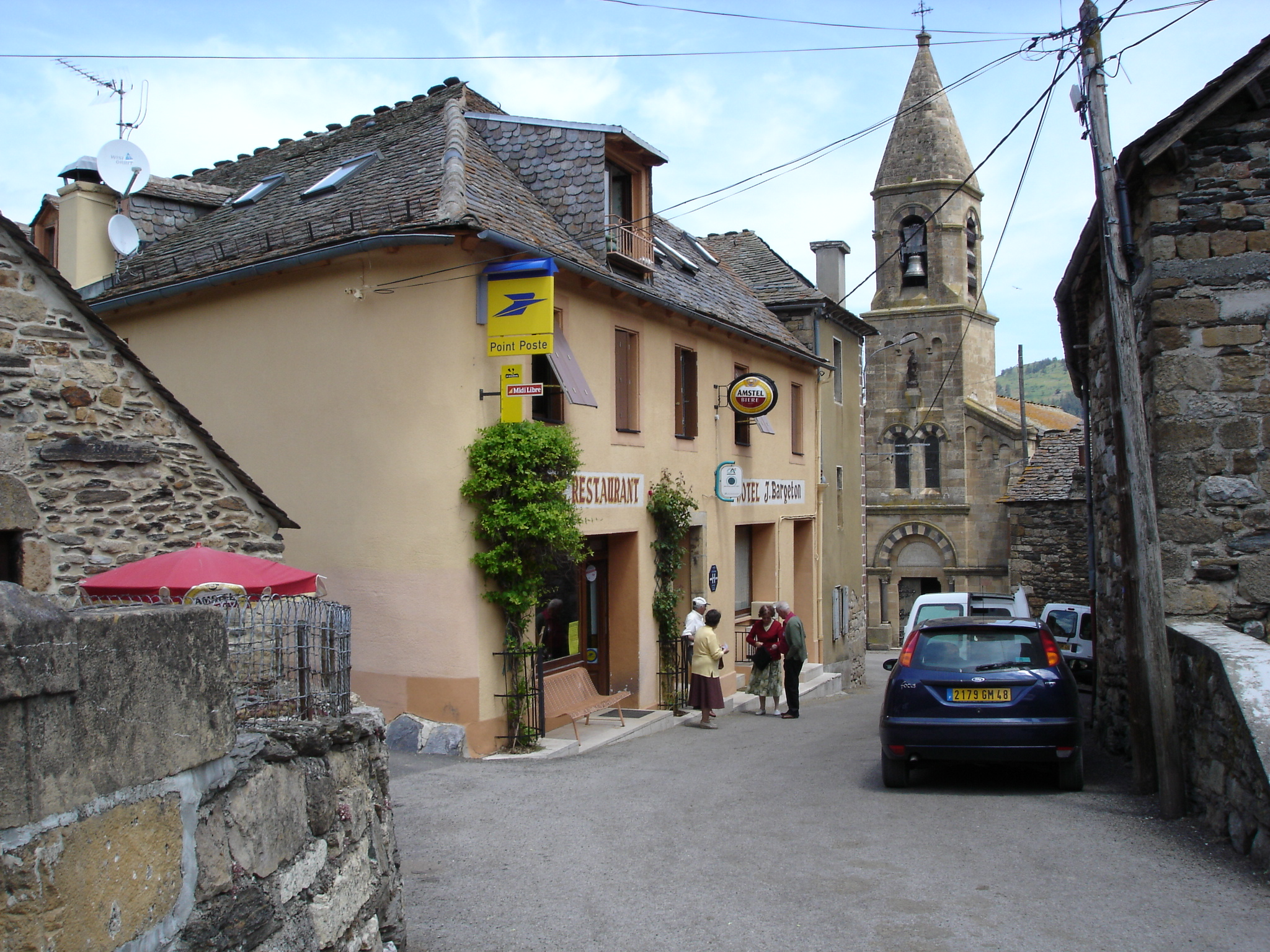
- A view within the village, of the church and surrounding buildings

- Coat of arms
- Location of Cubières
- Location within France Location within Occitanie
- Coordinates: 44°28′27″N 3°46′24″E
- Country: France
- Region: Occitania
- Department: Lozère
- Arrondissement: Mende
- Canton: Saint-Étienne-du-Valdonnez
- Intercommunality: CC Mont Lozère

Government
  - Mayor (2020–2026): Stéphan Massador
- Area^{1}: 48.88 km^{2} (18.87 sq mi)
- Elevation: 900 m (3,000 ft)
- Highest elevation: 1,633 m (5,358 ft)
- Lowest elevation: 756 m (2,480 ft)
- Population (2023): 187
  - Density: 3.83/km^{2} (9.91/sq mi)
- Time zone: UTC+01:00 (CET)
  - Summer (DST): UTC+02:00 (CEST)
- INSEE/Postal code: 48053 /48190
- ^{1} French Land Register data, which excludes lakes, ponds, glaciers > 1 km^{2} (0.386 sq mi or 247 acres) and river estuaries.

Cubières (French pronunciation: [kybjɛʁ]; Occitan: Cubièira) is a commune in the Lozère department in southern France.

== See also ==
- Communes of the Lozère department
