= Chadenet =

- Commune
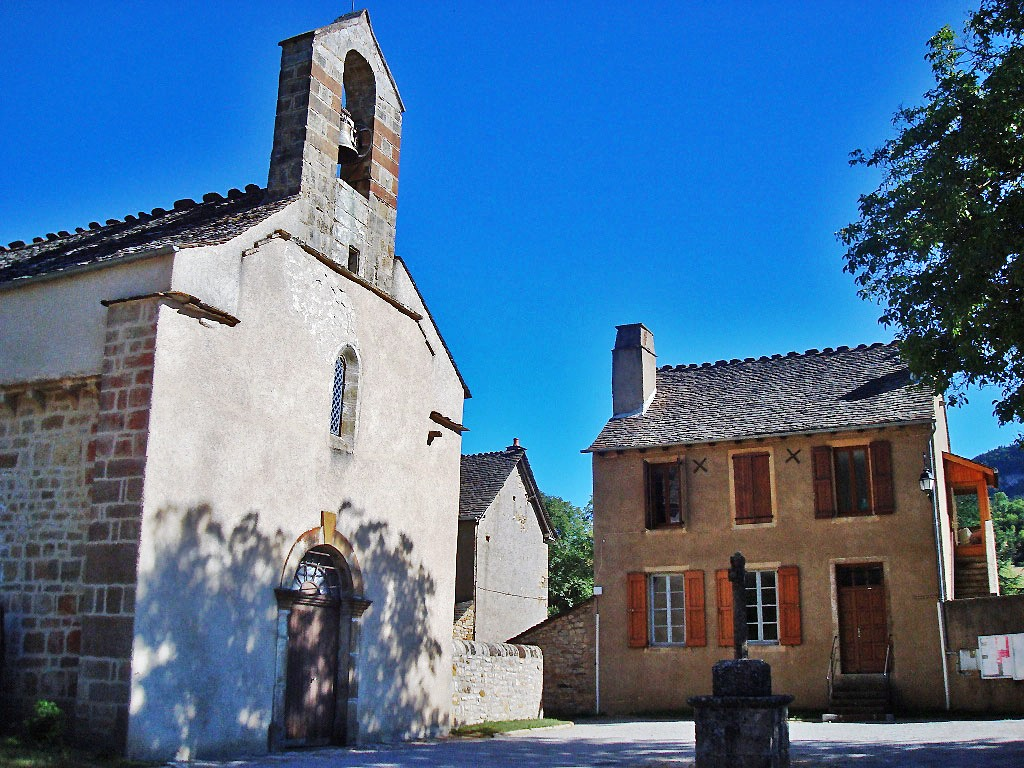
- Town hall
- Location of Chadenet
- Location within France Location within Occitanie
- Coordinates: 44°31′14″N 3°38′05″E
- Country: France
- Region: Occitania
- Department: Lozère
- Arrondissement: Mende
- Canton: Grandrieu
- Intercommunality: CC Mont Lozère

Government
  - Mayor (2020–2026): Antonin Arbousset
- Area^{1}: 12.96 km^{2} (5.00 sq mi)
- Elevation: 882 m (2,894 ft)
- Highest elevation: 1,345 m (4,413 ft)
- Lowest elevation: 859 m (2,818 ft)
- Population (2023): 123
  - Density: 9.49/km^{2} (24.6/sq mi)
- Time zone: UTC+01:00 (CET)
  - Summer (DST): UTC+02:00 (CEST)
- INSEE/Postal code: 48037 /48190
- ^{1} French Land Register data, which excludes lakes, ponds, glaciers > 1 km^{2} (0.386 sq mi or 247 acres) and river estuaries.

Chadenet (French pronunciation: [ʃadnɛ]) is a commune in the Lozère department in southern France.

== See also ==
- Communes of the Lozère department
