= Blavignac =

- Commune
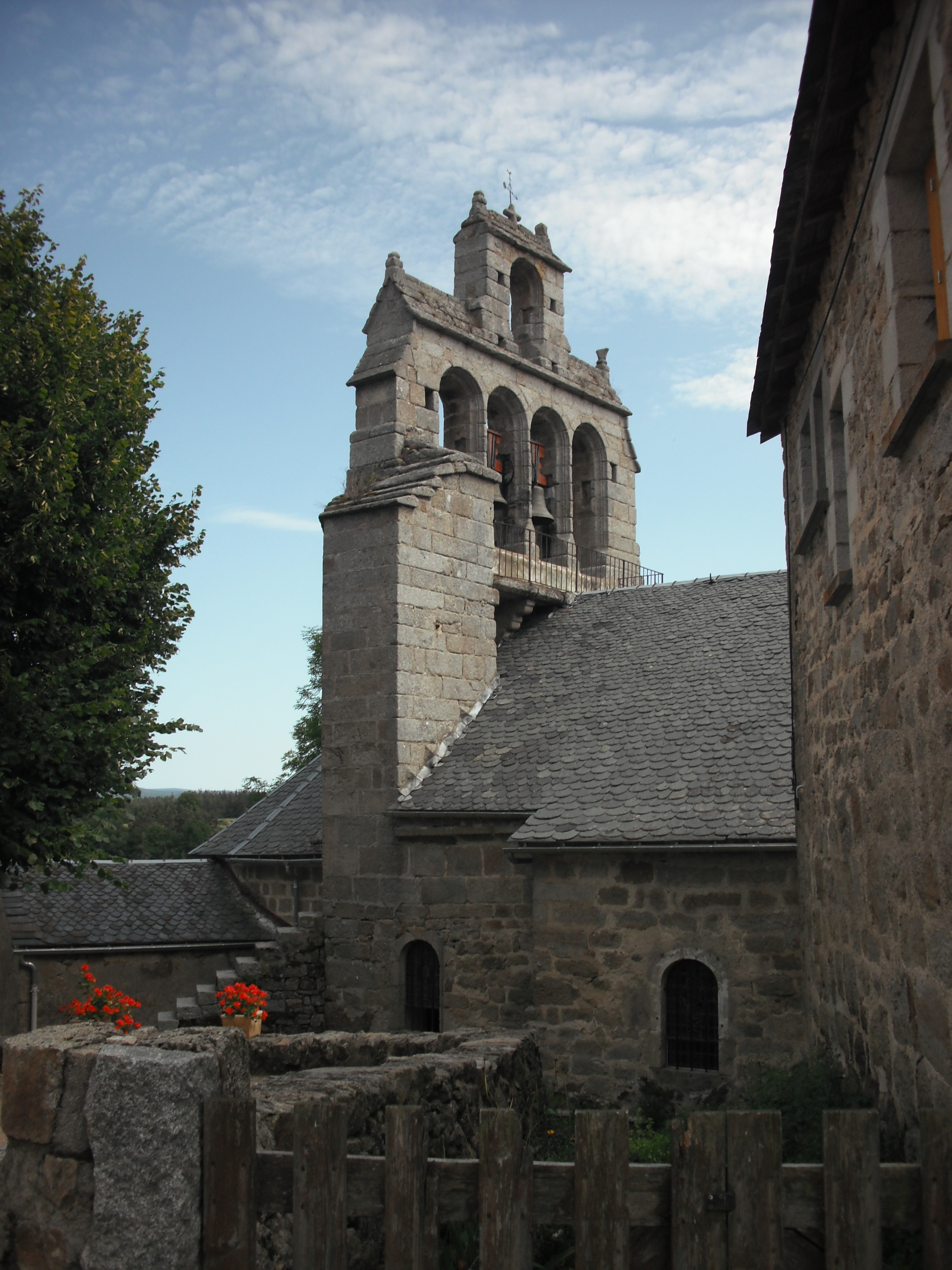
- The church in Blavignac
- Location of Blavignac
- Location within France Location within Occitanie
- Coordinates: 44°53′11″N 3°17′15″E
- Country: France
- Region: Occitania
- Department: Lozère
- Arrondissement: Mende
- Canton: Saint-Chély-d'Apcher

Government
  - Mayor (2020–2026): Yves Chadelat
- Area^{1}: 13.83 km^{2} (5.34 sq mi)
- Elevation: 963 m (3,159 ft)
- Highest elevation: 1,106 m (3,629 ft)
- Lowest elevation: 793 m (2,602 ft)
- Population (2023): 252
  - Density: 18.2/km^{2} (47.2/sq mi)
- Time zone: UTC+01:00 (CET)
  - Summer (DST): UTC+02:00 (CEST)
- INSEE/Postal code: 48026 /48200
- ^{1} French Land Register data, which excludes lakes, ponds, glaciers > 1 km^{2} (0.386 sq mi or 247 acres) and river estuaries.

Blavignac (French pronunciation: [blaviɲak]; Occitan: Blavinhac) is a commune in the Lozère department in southern France.

== Population ==
Historical population
Year	Pop.	±% p.a.
1968	207	—
1975	162	−3.44%
1982	246	+6.15%
1990	273	+1.31%
1999	225	−2.13%
2007	212	−0.74%
2012	283	+5.95%
2017	258	−1.83%
2023	252	−0.39%
Source: INSEE

== See also ==
- Communes of the Lozère department
