= Chastel-Nouvel =

- Commune
- Location of Chastel-Nouvel
- Location within France Location within Occitanie
- Coordinates: 44°33′35″N 3°30′09″E
- Country: France
- Region: Occitania
- Department: Lozère
- Arrondissement: Mende
- Canton: Saint-Alban-sur-Limagnole
- Intercommunality: CC Randon - Margeride

Government
  - Mayor (2020–2026): Didier Brunel
- Area^{1}: 31.50 km^{2} (12.16 sq mi)
- Elevation: 1,020 m (3,350 ft)
- Highest elevation: 1,302 m (4,272 ft)
- Lowest elevation: 759 m (2,490 ft)
- Population (2023): 938
  - Density: 29.8/km^{2} (77.1/sq mi)
- Time zone: UTC+01:00 (CET)
  - Summer (DST): UTC+02:00 (CEST)
- INSEE/Postal code: 48042 /48000
- ^{1} French Land Register data, which excludes lakes, ponds, glaciers > 1 km^{2} (0.386 sq mi or 247 acres) and river estuaries.

Chastel-Nouvel (French pronunciation: [ʃastɛl nuvɛl]; Occitan: Lo Chastèl) is a commune in the Lozère department in southern France.

== See also ==
- Communes of the Lozère department
