= Saint-Frézal-d'Albuges =

- Commune
- Location of Saint-Frézal-d'Albuges
- Location within France Location within Occitanie
- Coordinates: 44°34′11″N 3°45′24″E
- Country: France
- Region: Occitania
- Department: Lozère
- Arrondissement: Mende
- Canton: Grandrieu
- Intercommunality: CC Mont Lozère

Government
  - Mayor (2020–2026): Marie Thérèse Roche
- Area^{1}: 17.20 km^{2} (6.64 sq mi)
- Elevation: 1,190 m (3,900 ft)
- Highest elevation: 1,496 m (4,908 ft)
- Lowest elevation: 1,120 m (3,670 ft)
- Population (2023): 62
  - Density: 3.6/km^{2} (9.3/sq mi)
- Time zone: UTC+01:00 (CET)
  - Summer (DST): UTC+02:00 (CEST)
- INSEE/Postal code: 48151 /48170
- ^{1} French Land Register data, which excludes lakes, ponds, glaciers > 1 km^{2} (0.386 sq mi or 247 acres) and river estuaries.

Saint-Frézal-d'Albuges (Occitan: Sent Fresald d'Albujas) is a commune in the Lozère department in southern France.

== Geography ==
The river Chassezac has its source in the commune.

== See also ==
- Communes of the Lozère department
