= Saint-Gal =

- Commune
- Location of Saint-Gal
- Location within France Location within Occitanie
- Coordinates: 44°40′11″N 3°25′33″E
- Country: France
- Region: Occitania
- Department: Lozère
- Arrondissement: Mende
- Canton: Saint-Alban-sur-Limagnole
- Intercommunality: CC Randon - Margeride

Government
  - Mayor (2020–2026): Jean-Luc Goareguer
- Area^{1}: 9.88 km^{2} (3.81 sq mi)
- Elevation: 1,100 m (3,600 ft)
- Highest elevation: 1,143 m (3,750 ft)
- Lowest elevation: 993 m (3,258 ft)
- Population (2023): 89
  - Density: 9.0/km^{2} (23/sq mi)
- Time zone: UTC+01:00 (CET)
  - Summer (DST): UTC+02:00 (CEST)
- INSEE/Postal code: 48153 /48700
- ^{1} French Land Register data, which excludes lakes, ponds, glaciers > 1 km^{2} (0.386 sq mi or 247 acres) and river estuaries.

Saint-Gal (French pronunciation: [sɛ̃ ɡal]; Occitan: Sent Gal) is a commune in the Lozère department in southern France.

== See also ==
- Communes of the Lozère department
