= Pied-de-Borne =

- Commune
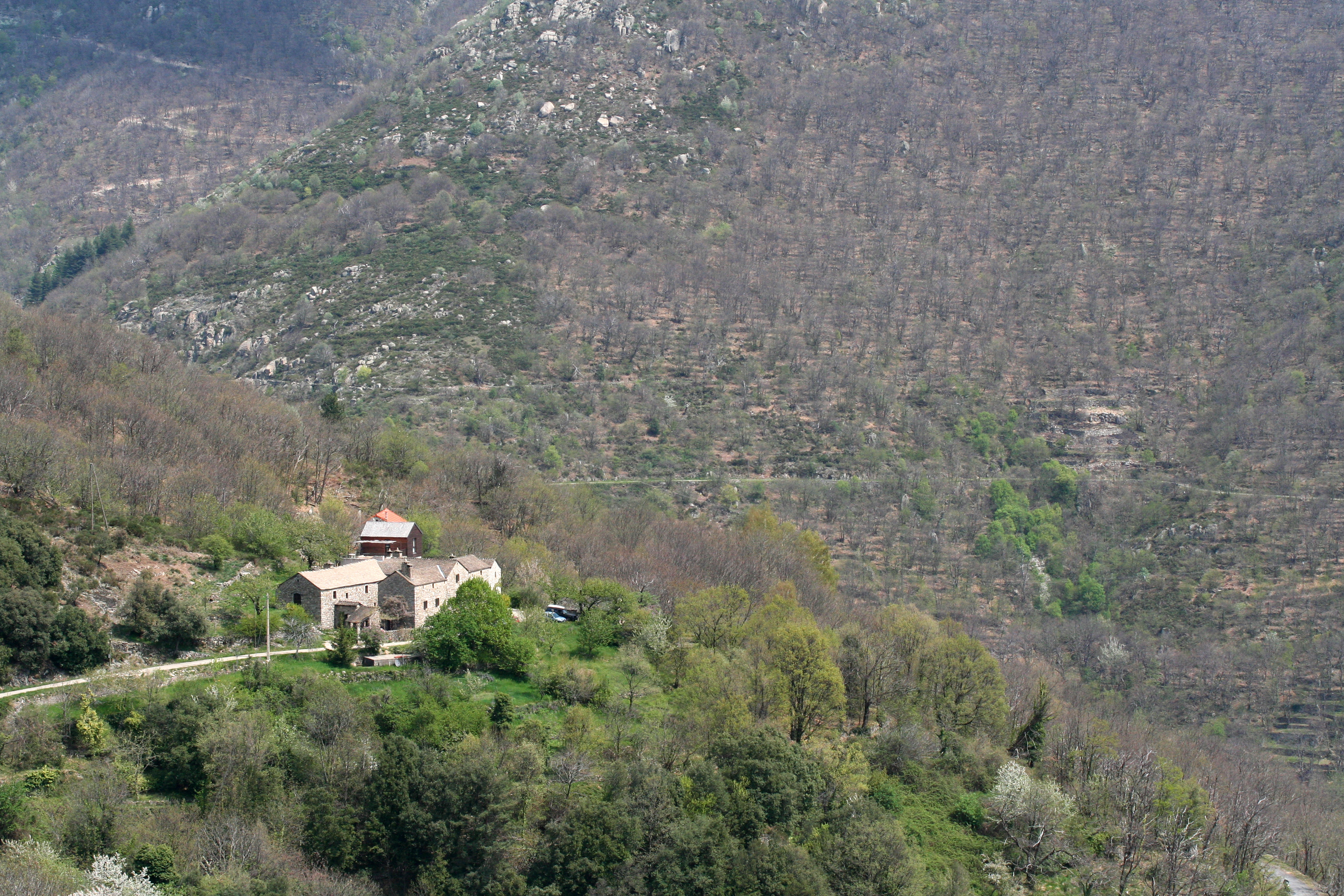
- The hamlet of Guinebaldès, in Pied-de-Borne

- Coat of arms
- Location of Pied-de-Borne
- Location within France Location within Occitanie
- Coordinates: 44°28′34″N 3°59′08″E
- Country: France
- Region: Occitania
- Department: Lozère
- Arrondissement: Mende
- Canton: Saint-Étienne-du-Valdonnez
- Intercommunality: CC Mont Lozère

Government
  - Mayor (2020–2026): Christian Masméjean
- Area^{1}: 27.89 km^{2} (10.77 sq mi)
- Elevation: 450 m (1,480 ft)
- Highest elevation: 960 m (3,150 ft)
- Lowest elevation: 276 m (906 ft)
- Population (2023): 208
  - Density: 7.46/km^{2} (19.3/sq mi)
- Time zone: UTC+01:00 (CET)
  - Summer (DST): UTC+02:00 (CEST)
- INSEE/Postal code: 48015 /48800
- ^{1} French Land Register data, which excludes lakes, ponds, glaciers > 1 km^{2} (0.386 sq mi or 247 acres) and river estuaries.

Pied-de-Borne (French pronunciation: [pje də bɔʁn]; Occitan: Pè de Bòrna) is a commune in the Lozère département in southern France.

== Geography ==
The commune is traversed by the river Chassezac.

== See also ==
- Communes of the Lozère department
