= Chauchailles =

- Commune
- Location of Chauchailles
- Location within France Location within Occitanie
- Coordinates: 44°47′46″N 3°05′01″E
- Country: France
- Region: Occitania
- Department: Lozère
- Arrondissement: Mende
- Canton: Peyre en Aubrac
- Intercommunality: Hautes Terres de l'Aubrac

Government
  - Mayor (2020–2026): Frédéric Florant
- Area^{1}: 17.40 km^{2} (6.72 sq mi)
- Elevation: 1,000 m (3,300 ft)
- Highest elevation: 1,257 m (4,124 ft)
- Lowest elevation: 918 m (3,012 ft)
- Population (2023): 75
  - Density: 4.3/km^{2} (11/sq mi)
- Time zone: UTC+01:00 (CET)
  - Summer (DST): UTC+02:00 (CEST)
- INSEE/Postal code: 48044 /48310
- ^{1} French Land Register data, which excludes lakes, ponds, glaciers > 1 km^{2} (0.386 sq mi or 247 acres) and river estuaries.

Chauchailles (French pronunciation: [ʃoʃaj]; Occitan: Chauchalhas) is a commune in the Lozère department in southern France.

== See also ==
- Communes of the Lozère department
