= Les Salces =

- Commune
- Location of Les Salces
- Location within France Location within Occitanie
- Coordinates: 44°32′06″N 3°09′45″E
- Country: France
- Region: Occitania
- Department: Lozère
- Arrondissement: Mende
- Canton: Peyre en Aubrac
- Intercommunality: Aubrac Lot Causses Tarn

Government
  - Mayor (2020–2026): Jean Louis Vayssier
- Area^{1}: 45.78 km^{2} (17.68 sq mi)
- Elevation: 1,080 m (3,540 ft)
- Highest elevation: 1,452 m (4,764 ft)
- Lowest elevation: 789 m (2,589 ft)
- Population (2023): 83
  - Density: 1.8/km^{2} (4.7/sq mi)
- Time zone: UTC+01:00 (CET)
  - Summer (DST): UTC+02:00 (CEST)
- INSEE/Postal code: 48187 /48100
- ^{1} French Land Register data, which excludes lakes, ponds, glaciers > 1 km^{2} (0.386 sq mi or 247 acres) and river estuaries.

Les Salces (French pronunciation: [le sals]; Occitan: Las Salças) is a commune in the Lozère department in southern France.

== See also ==
- Communes of the Lozère department
