= Recoules-d'Aubrac =

- Commune
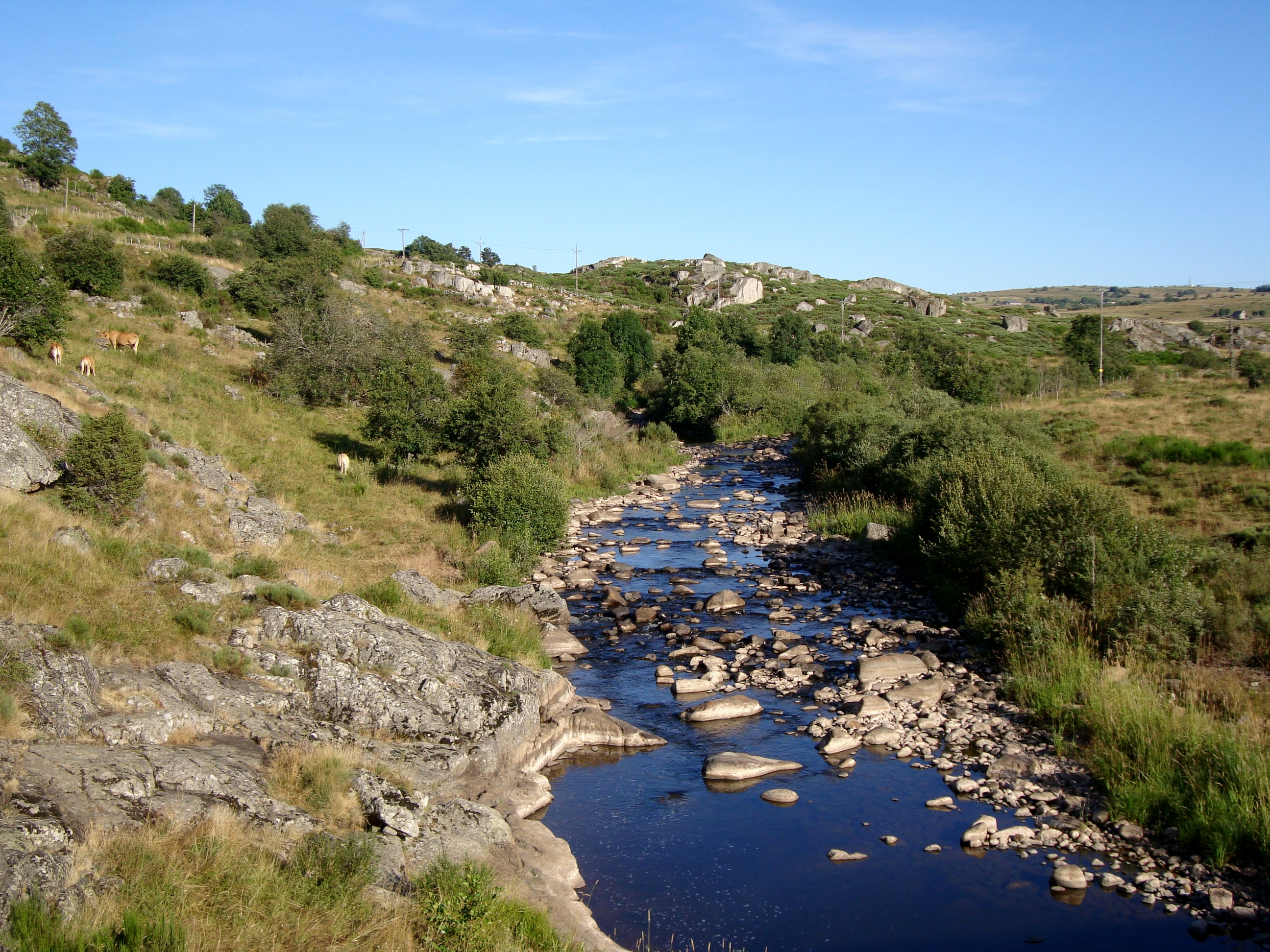
- The Bès river, in the valley of Recoules d'Aubrac

- Coat of arms
- Location of Recoules-d'Aubrac
- Location within France Location within Occitanie
- Coordinates: 44°41′34″N 3°01′29″E
- Country: France
- Region: Occitania
- Department: Lozère
- Arrondissement: Mende
- Canton: Peyre en Aubrac

Government
  - Mayor (2020–2026): Ève Brezet
- Area^{1}: 26.55 km^{2} (10.25 sq mi)
- Elevation: 1,120 m (3,670 ft)
- Highest elevation: 1,374 m (4,508 ft)
- Lowest elevation: 1,049 m (3,442 ft)
- Population (2023): 165
  - Density: 6.21/km^{2} (16.1/sq mi)
- Time zone: UTC+01:00 (CET)
  - Summer (DST): UTC+02:00 (CEST)
- INSEE/Postal code: 48123 /48260
- ^{1} French Land Register data, which excludes lakes, ponds, glaciers > 1 km^{2} (0.386 sq mi or 247 acres) and river estuaries.

Recoules-d'Aubrac (French pronunciation: [ʁəkul dobʁak]; Occitan: Recola d'Aubrac) is a commune in the Lozère department of southern France.

== See also ==
- Communes of the Lozère department
