= Albaret-le-Comtal =

- Commune
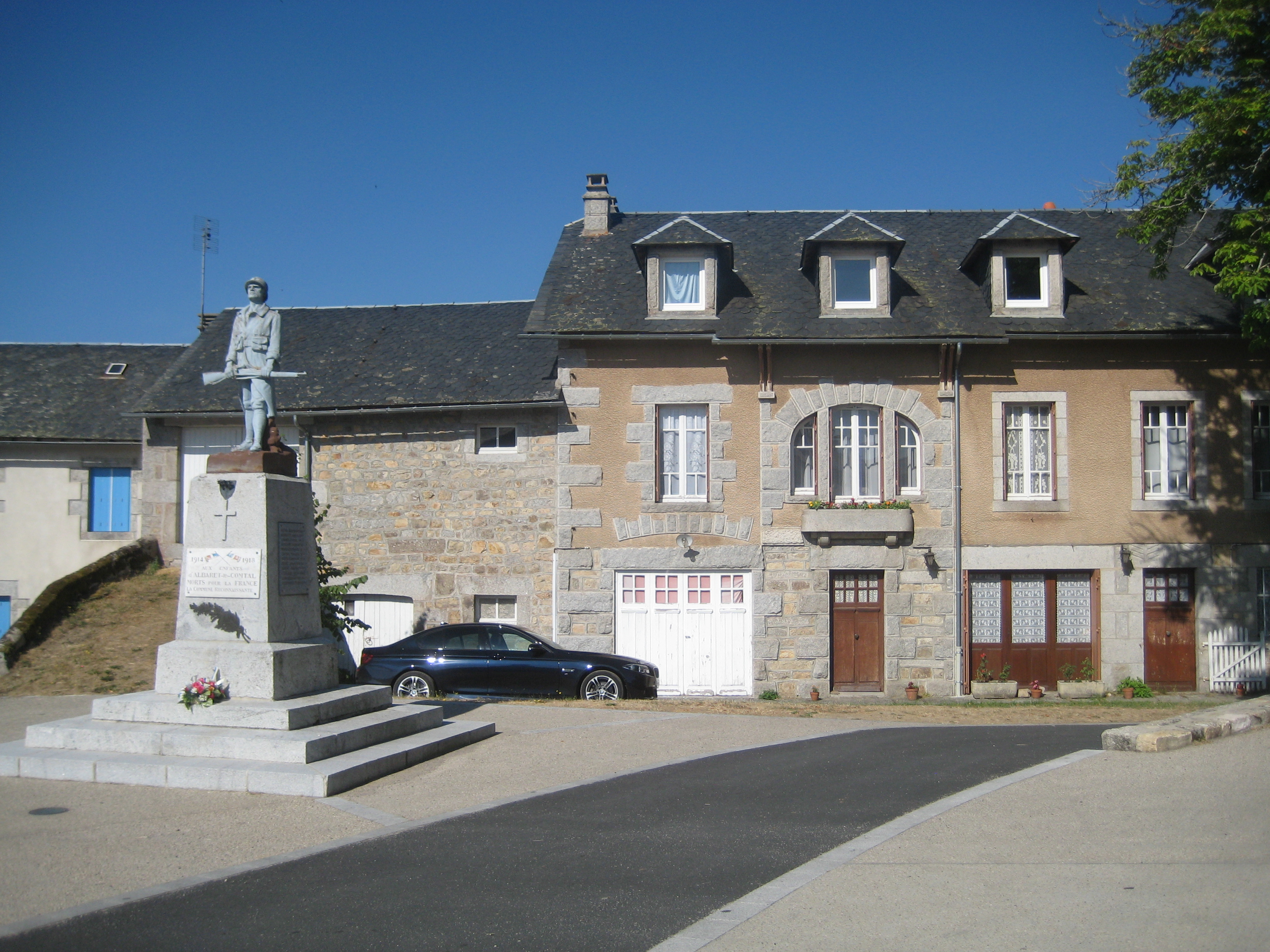
- Town hall

- Coat of arms
- Location of Albaret-le-Comtal
- Location within France Location within Occitanie
- Coordinates: 44°52′33″N 3°07′41″E
- Country: France
- Region: Occitania
- Department: Lozère
- Arrondissement: Mende
- Canton: Peyre en Aubrac
- Intercommunality: Hautes Terres de l'Aubrac

Government
  - Mayor (2020–2026): Frédérique Pellissier-Godard
- Area^{1}: 29.56 km^{2} (11.41 sq mi)
- Elevation: 1,000 m (3,300 ft)
- Highest elevation: 1,161 m (3,809 ft)
- Lowest elevation: 740 m (2,430 ft)
- Population (2023): 131
  - Density: 4.43/km^{2} (11.5/sq mi)
- Time zone: UTC+01:00 (CET)
  - Summer (DST): UTC+02:00 (CEST)
- INSEE/Postal code: 48001 /48310
- ^{1} French Land Register data, which excludes lakes, ponds, glaciers > 1 km^{2} (0.386 sq mi or 247 acres) and river estuaries.

Albaret-le-Comtal (French pronunciation: [albaʁɛ lə kɔ̃tal]; Occitan: Aubaret lo Comtal) is a commune in the Lozère department in southern France.

== Population ==
Historical population
Year	Pop.	±% p.a.
1968	303	—
1975	273	−1.48%
1982	248	−1.36%
1990	227	−1.10%
1999	198	−1.51%
2007	208	+0.62%
2012	185	−2.32%
2017	174	−1.22%
2023	131	−4.62%
Source: INSEE

== Economy ==
The village lies at the foot of a hydroelectric plant. The plant was built between 1916 and 1919 to supply energy to the hydrometallurgic factory at nearby Saint-Chély-du-Tarn.

== See also ==
- Communes of the Lozère department
