= Arzenc-d'Apcher =

- Commune
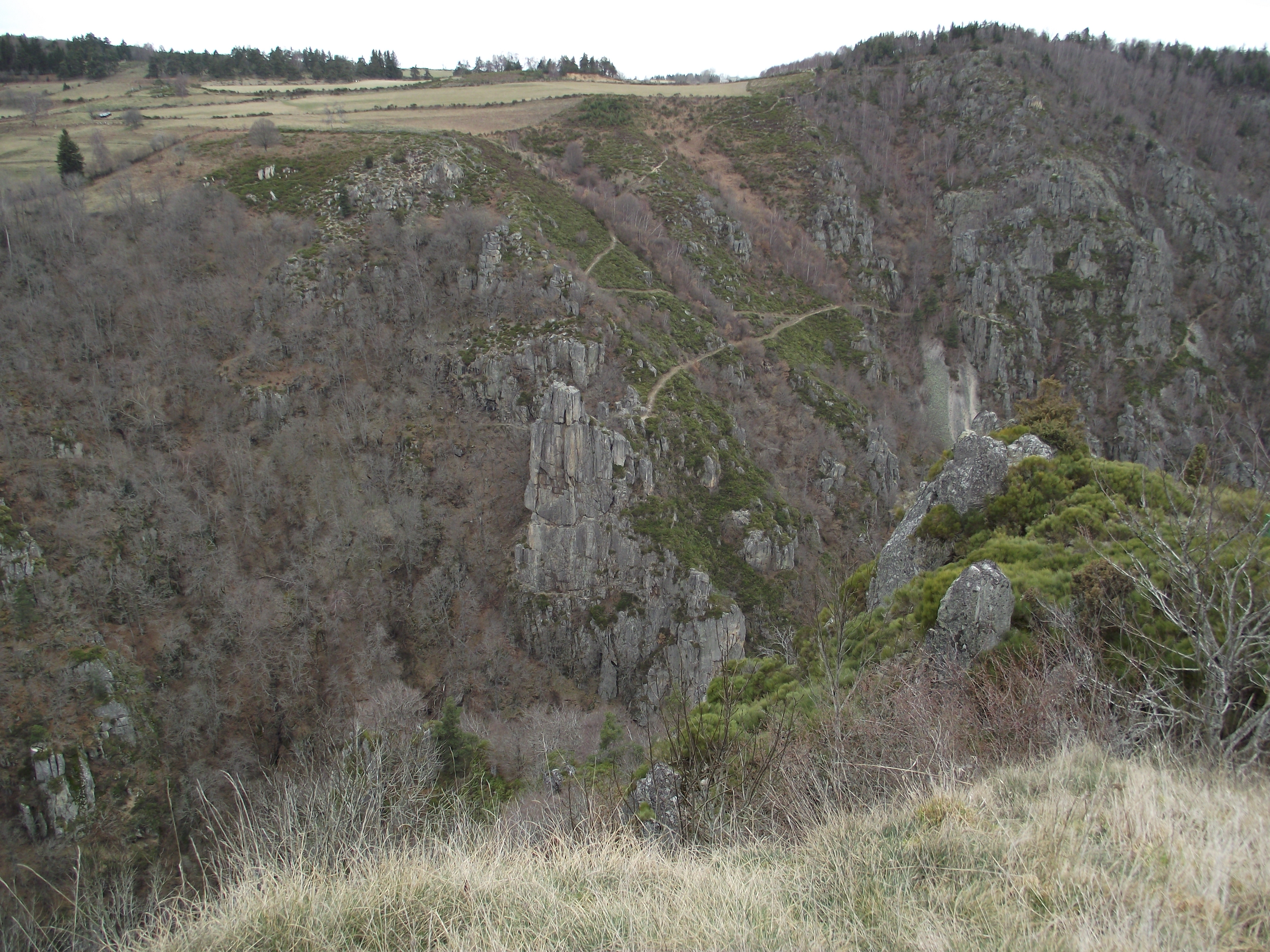
- The Gorge of Bès, in Arzenc-d'Apcher
- Location of Arzenc-d'Apcher
- Location within France Location within Occitanie
- Coordinates: 44°51′08″N 3°07′10″E
- Country: France
- Region: Occitania
- Department: Lozère
- Arrondissement: Mende
- Canton: Peyre en Aubrac
- Intercommunality: CC Hautes Terres Aubrac

Government
  - Mayor (2020–2026): Jean-Marie Tardieu
- Area^{1}: 7.88 km^{2} (3.04 sq mi)
- Elevation: 1,100 m (3,600 ft)
- Highest elevation: 1,137 m (3,730 ft)
- Lowest elevation: 760 m (2,490 ft)
- Population (2023): 52
  - Density: 6.6/km^{2} (17/sq mi)
- Time zone: UTC+01:00 (CET)
  - Summer (DST): UTC+02:00 (CEST)
- INSEE/Postal code: 48007 /48310
- ^{1} French Land Register data, which excludes lakes, ponds, glaciers > 1 km^{2} (0.386 sq mi or 247 acres) and river estuaries.

Arzenc-d'Apcher is a commune in the Lozère department in southern France.

== Population ==
Historical population
Year	Pop.	±% p.a.
1968	54	—
1975	51	−0.81%
1982	44	−2.09%
1990	49	+1.35%
1999	58	+1.89%
2007	48	−2.34%
2012	47	−0.42%
2017	50	+1.25%
2023	52	+0.66%
Source: INSEE

== See also ==
- Communes of the Lozère department
