= Fournels =

- Commune
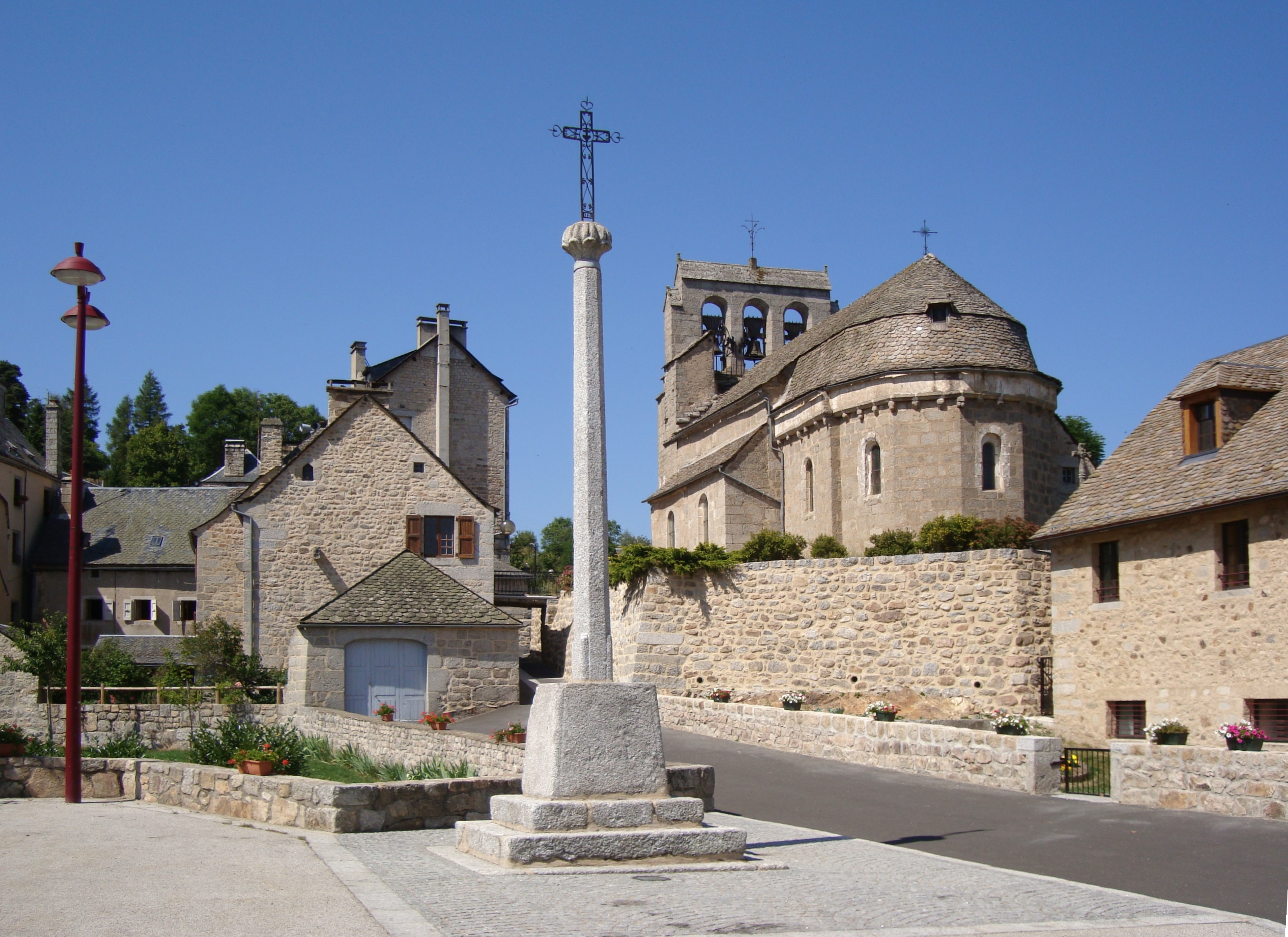
- The church square in Fournels

- Coat of arms
- Location of Fournels
- Location within France Location within Occitanie
- Coordinates: 44°49′03″N 3°07′18″E
- Country: France
- Region: Occitania
- Department: Lozère
- Arrondissement: Mende
- Canton: Peyre en Aubrac
- Intercommunality: Hautes Terres de l'Aubrac

Government
  - Mayor (2020–2026): Agnès Bouard
- Area^{1}: 15.76 km^{2} (6.08 sq mi)
- Elevation: 943 m (3,094 ft)
- Highest elevation: 1,240 m (4,070 ft)
- Lowest elevation: 909 m (2,982 ft)
- Population (2023): 371
  - Density: 23.5/km^{2} (61.0/sq mi)
- Time zone: UTC+01:00 (CET)
  - Summer (DST): UTC+02:00 (CEST)
- INSEE/Postal code: 48064 /48310
- ^{1} French Land Register data, which excludes lakes, ponds, glaciers > 1 km^{2} (0.386 sq mi or 247 acres) and river estuaries.

Fournels (French pronunciation: [fuʁnɛl]; Occitan: Fornèls) is a commune in the Lozère department in southern France.

== See also ==
- Communes of the Lozère department
