= Grandvals =

- Commune
- Location of Grandvals
- Location within France Location within Occitanie
- Coordinates: 44°44′26″N 3°02′16″E
- Country: France
- Region: Occitania
- Department: Lozère
- Arrondissement: Mende
- Canton: Peyre en Aubrac
- Intercommunality: Hautes Terres de l'Aubrac

Government
  - Mayor (2020–2026): Laurent Prat
- Area^{1}: 12.84 km^{2} (4.96 sq mi)
- Elevation: 1,048 m (3,438 ft)
- Highest elevation: 1,235 m (4,052 ft)
- Lowest elevation: 1,018 m (3,340 ft)
- Population (2023): 61
  - Density: 4.8/km^{2} (12/sq mi)
- Time zone: UTC+01:00 (CET)
  - Summer (DST): UTC+02:00 (CEST)
- INSEE/Postal code: 48071 /48260
- ^{1} French Land Register data, which excludes lakes, ponds, glaciers > 1 km^{2} (0.386 sq mi or 247 acres) and river estuaries.

Grandvals (French pronunciation: [ɡʁɑ̃val]; Occitan: Grandval) is a commune in the Lozère department in southern France.

== See also ==
- Communes of the Lozère department
