= Les Hermaux =

- Commune
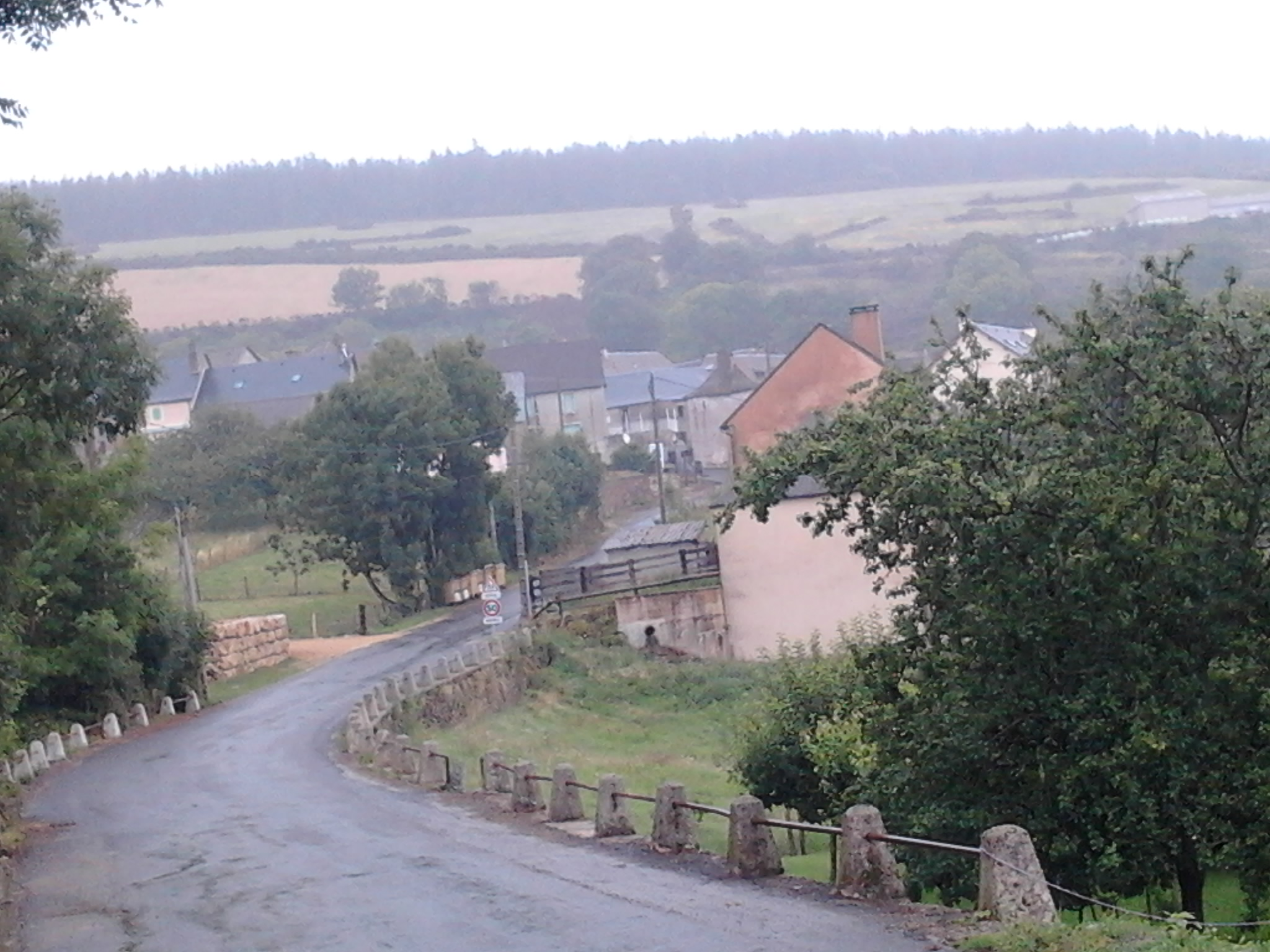
- The village of Les Hermaux
- Location of Les Hermaux
- Location within France Location within Occitanie
- Coordinates: 44°31′01″N 3°07′57″E
- Country: France
- Region: Occitania
- Department: Lozère
- Arrondissement: Mende
- Canton: Peyre en Aubrac
- Intercommunality: Aubrac Lot Causses Tarn

Government
  - Mayor (2020–2026): Yves Rodier
- Area^{1}: 17.59 km^{2} (6.79 sq mi)
- Elevation: 1,050 m (3,440 ft)
- Highest elevation: 1,361 m (4,465 ft)
- Lowest elevation: 589 m (1,932 ft)
- Population (2023): 108
  - Density: 6.14/km^{2} (15.9/sq mi)
- Time zone: UTC+01:00 (CET)
  - Summer (DST): UTC+02:00 (CEST)
- INSEE/Postal code: 48073 /48340
- ^{1} French Land Register data, which excludes lakes, ponds, glaciers > 1 km^{2} (0.386 sq mi or 247 acres) and river estuaries.

Les Hermaux (French pronunciation: [le.z‿ɛʁmo]; Occitan: Los Ermals) is a commune in the Lozère department in southern France.

== See also ==
- Communes of the Lozère department
