= Brion, Lozère =

Brion
- Commune
- Coat of arms
- Location of Brion
- Location within France Location within Occitanie
- Coordinates: 44°45′19″N 3°04′18″E
- Country: France
- Region: Occitania
- Department: Lozère
- Arrondissement: Mende
- Canton: Peyre en Aubrac
- Intercommunality: Hautes Terres de l'Aubrac

Government
  - Mayor (2020–2026): Daniel Longeac
- Area^{1}: 22.11 km^{2} (8.54 sq mi)
- Elevation: 1,100 m (3,600 ft)
- Highest elevation: 1,272 m (4,173 ft)
- Lowest elevation: 980 m (3,220 ft)
- Population (2023): 88
  - Density: 4.0/km^{2} (10/sq mi)
- Time zone: UTC+01:00 (CET)
  - Summer (DST): UTC+02:00 (CEST)
- INSEE/Postal code: 48031 /48310
- ^{1} French Land Register data, which excludes lakes, ponds, glaciers > 1 km^{2} (0.386 sq mi or 247 acres) and river estuaries.

Brion (French pronunciation: [bʁijɔ̃]) is a commune in the Lozère department in southern France.

== Population ==
Historical population
Year	Pop.	±% p.a.
1968	175	—
1975	145	−2.65%
1982	143	−0.20%
1990	114	−2.79%
1999	109	−0.50%
2007	94	−1.83%
2012	96	+0.42%
2017	79	−3.82%
2023	88	+1.81%
Source: INSEE

== See also ==
- Communes of the Lozère department
