= Saint-Laurent-de-Veyrès =

- Commune
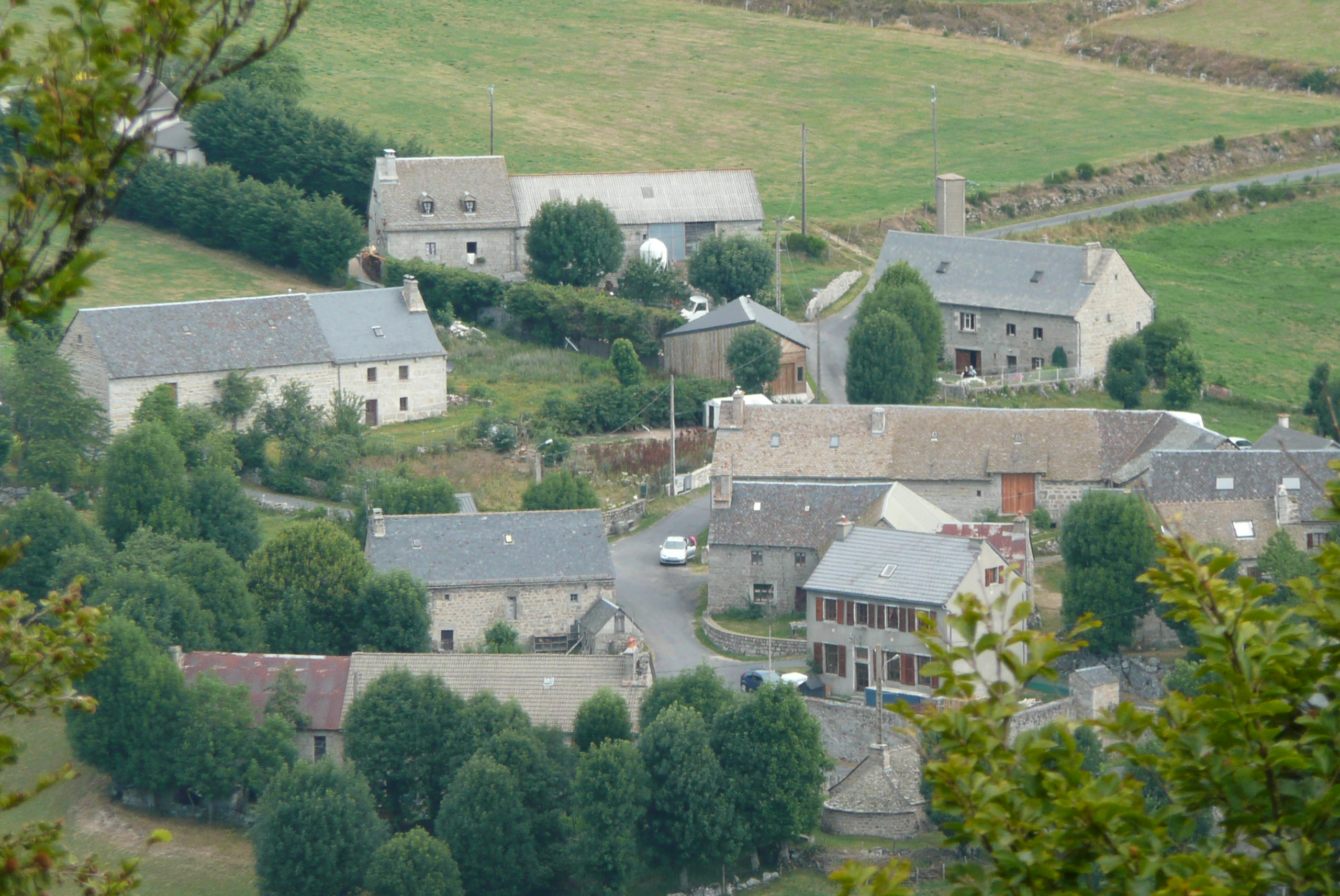
- The village of Veyrès, from above
- Location of Saint-Laurent-de-Veyrès
- Location within France Location within Occitanie
- Coordinates: 44°46′17″N 3°07′46″E
- Country: France
- Region: Occitania
- Department: Lozère
- Arrondissement: Mende
- Canton: Peyre en Aubrac
- Intercommunality: Hautes Terres de l'Aubrac

Government
  - Mayor (2020–2026): Alain Brun
- Area^{1}: 9.11 km^{2} (3.52 sq mi)
- Elevation: 1,150 m (3,770 ft)
- Highest elevation: 1,271 m (4,170 ft)
- Lowest elevation: 1,030 m (3,380 ft)
- Population (2023): 31
  - Density: 3.4/km^{2} (8.8/sq mi)
- Time zone: UTC+01:00 (CET)
  - Summer (DST): UTC+02:00 (CEST)
- INSEE/Postal code: 48167 /48310
- ^{1} French Land Register data, which excludes lakes, ponds, glaciers > 1 km^{2} (0.386 sq mi or 247 acres) and river estuaries.

Saint-Laurent-de-Veyrès (French pronunciation: [sɛ̃ loʁɑ̃ də veʁɛs]; Occitan: Sent Laurenç de Vèires) is a commune in the Lozère department in southern France.

== See also ==
- Communes of the Lozère department
