= Noalhac =

- Commune
- Location of Noalhac
- Location within France Location within Occitanie
- Coordinates: 44°48′44″N 3°06′27″E
- Country: France
- Region: Occitania
- Department: Lozère
- Arrondissement: Mende
- Canton: Peyre en Aubrac
- Intercommunality: Hautes Terres de l'Aubrac

Government
  - Mayor (2020–2026): Michel Poulalion
- Area^{1}: 13.51 km^{2} (5.22 sq mi)
- Elevation: 1,000 m (3,300 ft)
- Highest elevation: 1,255 m (4,117 ft)
- Lowest elevation: 913 m (2,995 ft)
- Population (2023): 94
  - Density: 7.0/km^{2} (18/sq mi)
- Time zone: UTC+01:00 (CET)
  - Summer (DST): UTC+02:00 (CEST)
- INSEE/Postal code: 48106 /48310
- ^{1} French Land Register data, which excludes lakes, ponds, glaciers > 1 km^{2} (0.386 sq mi or 247 acres) and river estuaries.

Noalhac is a commune in the Lozère département in southern France.

== See also ==
- Communes of the Lozère department
