= Canton of Peyre en Aubrac =

Coordinates: 44.72°N 3.28°E

The canton of Peyre en Aubrac (before March 2020: canton of Aumont-Aubrac) is an administrative division of the Lozère department, southern France. Its borders were modified at the French canton reorganisation which came into effect in March 2015. Its seat is in Peyre en Aubrac.

It consists of the following communes:

1. Albaret-le-Comtal
2. Arzenc-d'Apcher
3. Les Bessons
4. Brion
5. Le Buisson
6. Chauchailles
7. La Fage-Montivernoux
8. La Fage-Saint-Julien
9. Fournels
10. Grandvals
11. Les Hermaux
12. Marchastel
13. Les Monts-Verts
14. Nasbinals
15. Noalhac
16. Peyre en Aubrac
17. Prinsuéjols-Malbouzon
18. Recoules-d'Aubrac
19. Saint-Juéry
20. Saint-Laurent-de-Muret
21. Saint-Laurent-de-Veyrès
22. Saint-Pierre-de-Nogaret
23. Les Salces
24. Termes
25. Trélans
