= Termes, Lozère =

Termes
- Commune
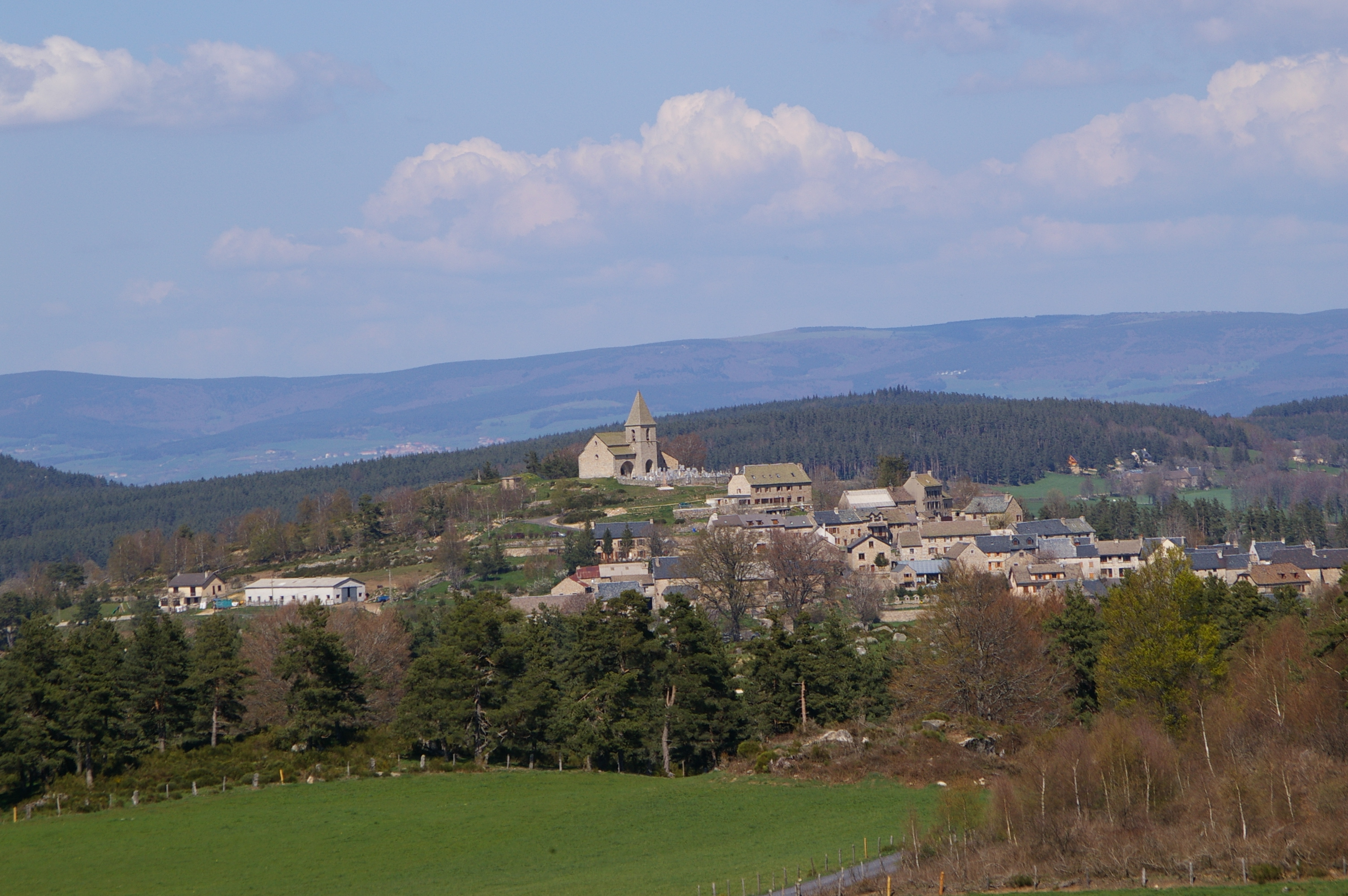
- A general view of Termes
- Location of Termes
- Location within France Location within Occitanie
- Coordinates: 44°48′50″N 3°10′02″E
- Country: France
- Region: Occitania
- Department: Lozère
- Arrondissement: Mende
- Canton: Peyre en Aubrac
- Intercommunality: Hautes Terres de l'Aubrac

Government
  - Mayor (2020–2026): Raymonde Joubert
- Area^{1}: 17.65 km^{2} (6.81 sq mi)
- Elevation: 1,122 m (3,681 ft)
- Highest elevation: 1,223 m (4,012 ft)
- Lowest elevation: 1,015 m (3,330 ft)
- Population (2023): 214
  - Density: 12.1/km^{2} (31.4/sq mi)
- Time zone: UTC+01:00 (CET)
  - Summer (DST): UTC+02:00 (CEST)
- INSEE/Postal code: 48190 /48310
- ^{1} French Land Register data, which excludes lakes, ponds, glaciers > 1 km^{2} (0.386 sq mi or 247 acres) and river estuaries.

Termes (French pronunciation: [tɛʁm]; Occitan: Tèrmes) is a commune in the Lozère department in southern France.

== See also ==
- Communes of the Lozère department
