= Trélans =

- Commune
- Location of Trélans
- Location within France Location within Occitanie
- Coordinates: 44°30′01″N 3°05′34″E
- Country: France
- Region: Occitania
- Department: Lozère
- Arrondissement: Mende
- Canton: Peyre en Aubrac
- Intercommunality: Aubrac Lot Causses Tarn

Government
  - Mayor (2020–2026): Christian Cabirou
- Area^{1}: 23.55 km^{2} (9.09 sq mi)
- Elevation: 910 m (2,990 ft)
- Highest elevation: 1,469 m (4,820 ft)
- Lowest elevation: 714 m (2,343 ft)
- Population (2023): 88
  - Density: 3.7/km^{2} (9.7/sq mi)
- Time zone: UTC+01:00 (CET)
  - Summer (DST): UTC+02:00 (CEST)
- INSEE/Postal code: 48192 /48340
- ^{1} French Land Register data, which excludes lakes, ponds, glaciers > 1 km^{2} (0.386 sq mi or 247 acres) and river estuaries.

Trélans is a commune in the Lozère department in southern France.

== See also ==
- Communes of the Lozère department
