= Marchastel, Lozère =

Marchastel
- Commune
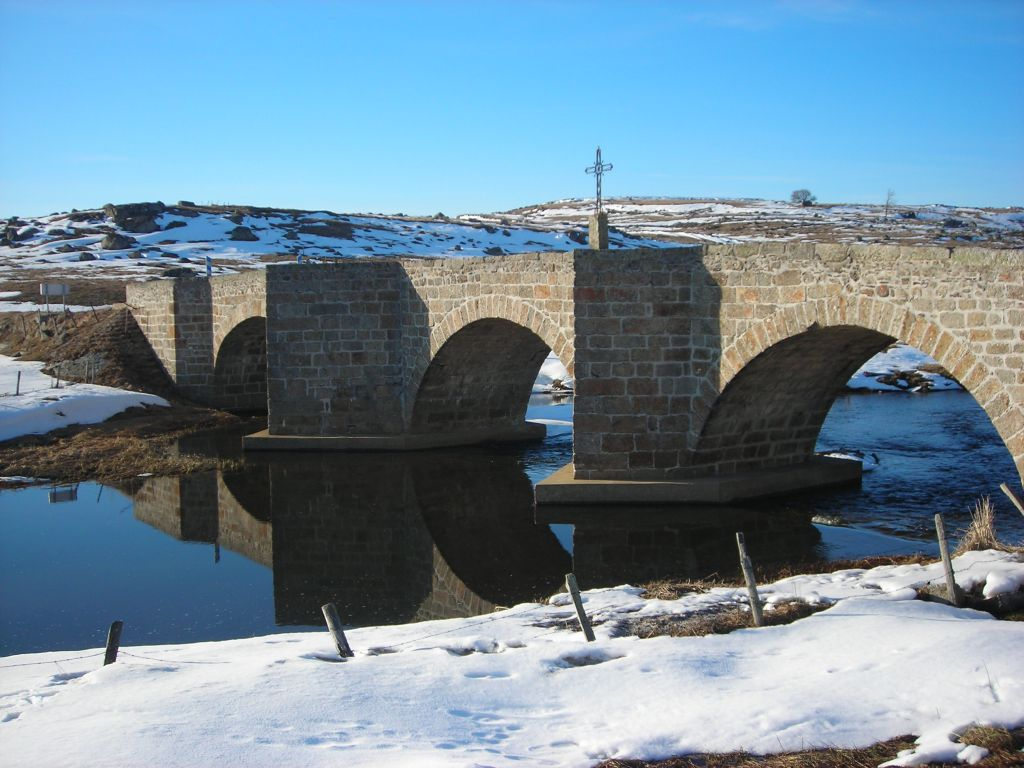
- The Marchastel bridge, over the river Bès
- Location of Marchastel
- Location within France Location within Occitanie
- Coordinates: 44°39′07″N 3°06′27″E
- Country: France
- Region: Occitania
- Department: Lozère
- Arrondissement: Mende
- Canton: Peyre en Aubrac
- Intercommunality: Hautes Terres de l'Aubrac

Government
  - Mayor (2020–2026): Éric Malherbe
- Area^{1}: 34.87 km^{2} (13.46 sq mi)
- Elevation: 1,200 m (3,900 ft)
- Highest elevation: 1,304 m (4,278 ft)
- Lowest elevation: 1,139 m (3,737 ft)
- Population (2023): 44
  - Density: 1.3/km^{2} (3.3/sq mi)
- Time zone: UTC+01:00 (CET)
  - Summer (DST): UTC+02:00 (CEST)
- INSEE/Postal code: 48091 /48260
- ^{1} French Land Register data, which excludes lakes, ponds, glaciers > 1 km^{2} (0.386 sq mi or 247 acres) and river estuaries.

Marchastel (French pronunciation: [maʁʃastɛl]; Occitan: Marchastèl) is a commune in the Lozère department in southern France.

== See also ==
- Communes of the Lozère department
