= La Fage-Montivernoux =

- Commune
- Coat of arms
- Location of La Fage-Montivernoux
- Location within France Location within Occitanie
- Coordinates: 44°45′32″N 3°09′11″E
- Country: France
- Region: Occitania
- Department: Lozère
- Arrondissement: Mende
- Canton: Peyre en Aubrac
- Intercommunality: Hautes Terres de l'Aubrac

Government
  - Mayor (2020–2026): Bernard Beaufils
- Area^{1}: 37.77 km^{2} (14.58 sq mi)
- Elevation: 1,200 m (3,900 ft)
- Highest elevation: 1,292 m (4,239 ft)
- Lowest elevation: 1,030 m (3,380 ft)
- Population (2023): 131
  - Density: 3.47/km^{2} (8.98/sq mi)
- Time zone: UTC+01:00 (CET)
  - Summer (DST): UTC+02:00 (CEST)
- INSEE/Postal code: 48058 /48310
- ^{1} French Land Register data, which excludes lakes, ponds, glaciers > 1 km^{2} (0.386 sq mi or 247 acres) and river estuaries.

La Fage-Montivernoux (French pronunciation: [la faʒ mɔ̃tivɛʁnu]; Occitan: La Faja) is a commune in the Lozère department in southern France.

== See also ==
- Communes of the Lozère department
