= Saint-Juéry, Lozère =

Saint-Juéry
- Commune
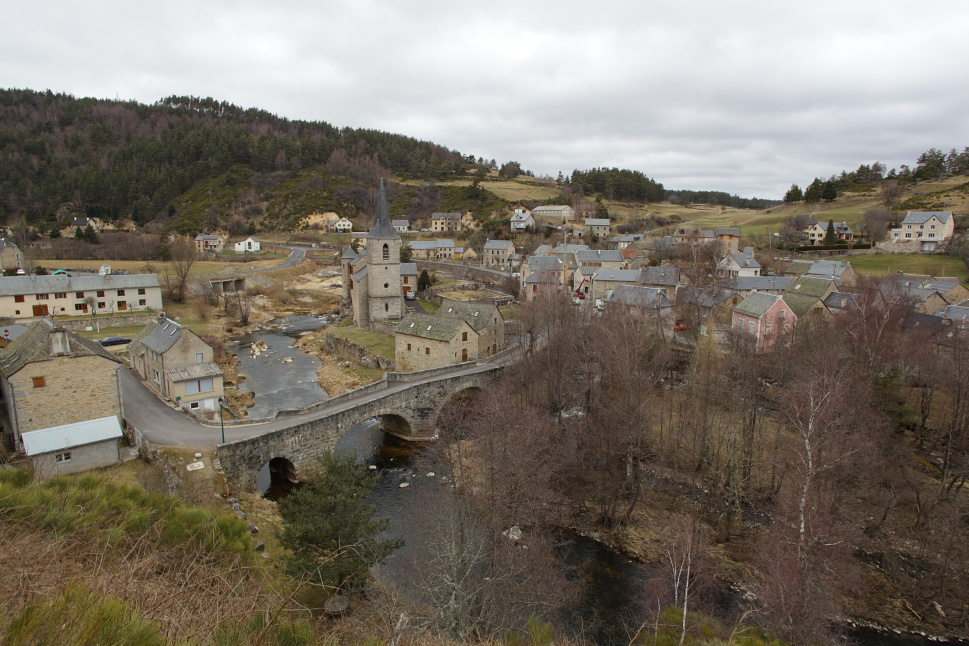
- A general view of Saint-Juéry, with the church, and bridge over the river
- Location of Saint-Juéry
- Location within France Location within Occitanie
- Coordinates: 44°49′42″N 3°05′12″E
- Country: France
- Region: Occitania
- Department: Lozère
- Arrondissement: Mende
- Canton: Peyre en Aubrac
- Intercommunality: Hautes Terres de l'Aubrac

Government
  - Mayor (2020–2026): Lucette Boucharinc
- Area^{1}: 1.65 km^{2} (0.64 sq mi)
- Elevation: 920 m (3,020 ft)
- Highest elevation: 1,064 m (3,491 ft)
- Lowest elevation: 910 m (2,990 ft)
- Population (2023): 51
  - Density: 31/km^{2} (80/sq mi)
- Time zone: UTC+01:00 (CET)
  - Summer (DST): UTC+02:00 (CEST)
- INSEE/Postal code: 48161 /48310
- ^{1} French Land Register data, which excludes lakes, ponds, glaciers > 1 km^{2} (0.386 sq mi or 247 acres) and river estuaries.

Saint-Juéry (French pronunciation: [sɛ̃ ʒɥeʁi]; Occitan: Sent Juèri) is a commune in the Lozère department in southern France.

== See also ==
- Communes of the Lozère department
