= Fraissinet-de-Lozère =

- Part of Pont-de-Montvert-Sud-Mont-Lozère
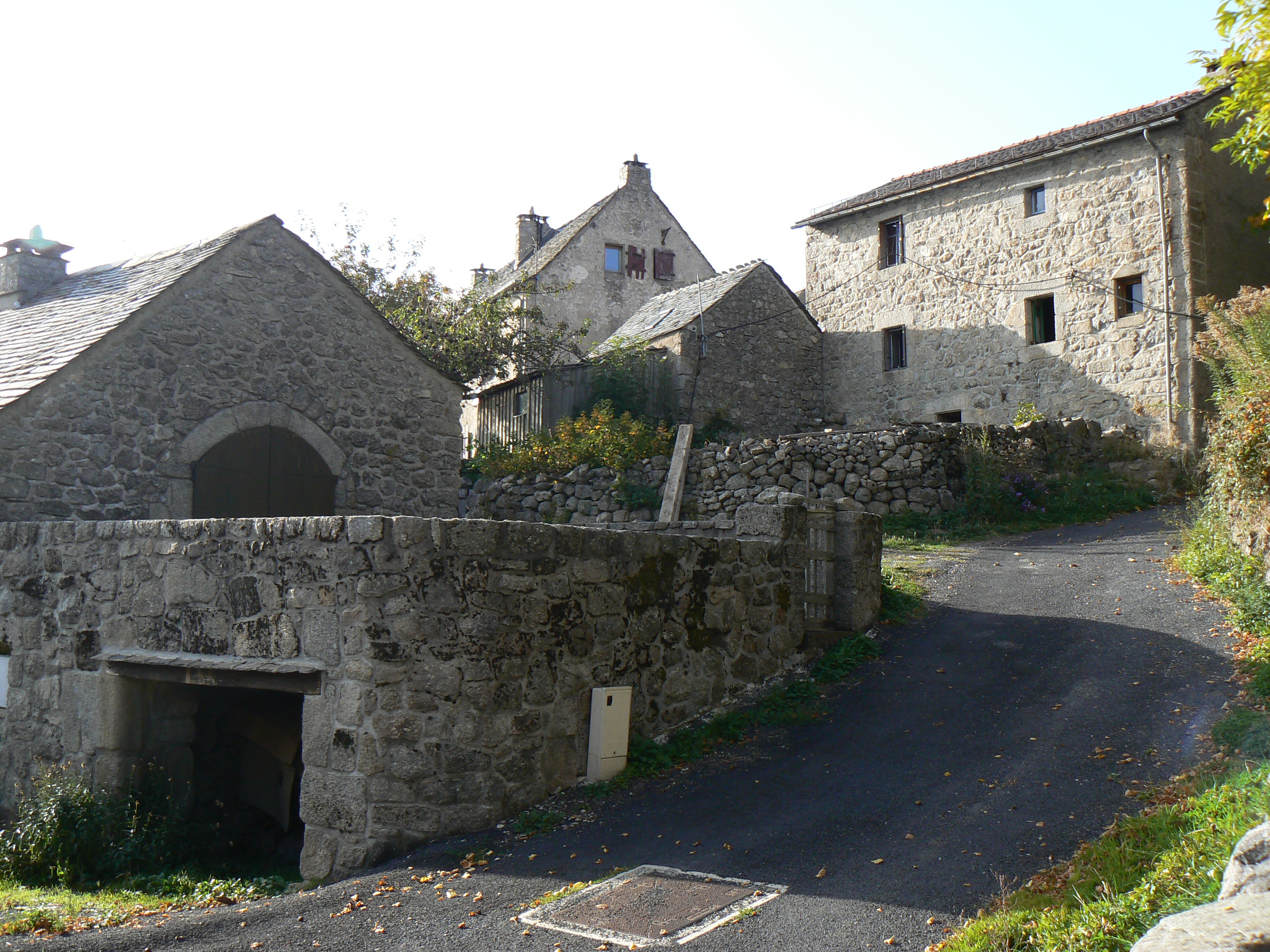
- Buildings in Fraissinet-de-Lozère
- Location of Fraissinet-de-Lozère
- Location within France Location within Occitanie
- Coordinates: 44°22′31″N 3°42′05″E
- Country: France
- Region: Occitania
- Department: Lozère
- Arrondissement: Florac
- Canton: Saint-Étienne-du-Valdonnez
- Commune: Pont-de-Montvert-Sud-Mont-Lozère
- Area^{1}: 38.58 km^{2} (14.90 sq mi)
- Elevation: 1,060 m (3,480 ft)
- Highest elevation: 1,699 m (5,574 ft)
- Lowest elevation: 669 m (2,195 ft)
- Population (2019): 192
  - Density: 4.98/km^{2} (12.9/sq mi)
- Time zone: UTC+01:00 (CET)
  - Summer (DST): UTC+02:00 (CEST)
- Postal code: 48220
- ^{1} French Land Register data, which excludes lakes, ponds, glaciers > 1 km^{2} (0.386 sq mi or 247 acres) and river estuaries.

Fraissinet-de-Lozère (French pronunciation: [fʁɛsin də lozɛʁ]; Occitan: Fraissinet de Losera) is a former commune in the Lozère department in southern France. On 1 January 2016, it was merged into the new commune of Pont-de-Montvert-Sud-Mont-Lozère. Its population was 192 in 2019.

== History ==
Fraissinet-de-Lozère was one of the earliest communities of Huguenots in France.

After the revocation of the Edict of Nantes in 1685 by the Edict of Fontainebleau, several people from Fraissinet-de-Lozère fled to England or the Dutch Republic. They kept in touch with their family, though, even during the Nine Years' War (1688-1697). They managed to maintain networks, so that people, money and information would come and go from Cévennes to the Dutch Republic. An account of the Battles of Barfleur and La Hogue (1692) elaborated by Dutch propaganda, very critical against Louis XIV, was thus sent and kept by the main characters of the Rouvière family, one of the most powerful groups of the village. This could mean that "newly converted" did not plainly support their king.

During the War of the Camisards, it was very close to the birthplace of the revolt, the village of Le Pont-de-Montvert. Nevertheless, the village remained loyal to the king, though it received no special treatment, and was burned down by the troops as other Protestant villages of the Cévennes in 1703.

== See also ==
- Communes of the Lozère department
