= Saint-Maurice-de-Ventalon =

- Part of Pont-de-Montvert-Sud-Mont-Lozère
- Coat of arms
- Location of Saint-Maurice-de-Ventalon
- Location within France Location within Occitanie
- Coordinates: 44°19′25″N 3°49′47″E
- Country: France
- Region: Occitania
- Department: Lozère
- Arrondissement: Florac
- Canton: Saint-Étienne-du-Valdonnez
- Commune: Pont-de-Montvert-Sud-Mont-Lozère
- Area^{1}: 38.51 km^{2} (14.87 sq mi)
- Elevation: 1,000 m (3,300 ft)
- Highest elevation: 1,493 m (4,898 ft)
- Lowest elevation: 640 m (2,100 ft)
- Population (2019): 57
  - Density: 1.5/km^{2} (3.8/sq mi)
- Time zone: UTC+01:00 (CET)
  - Summer (DST): UTC+02:00 (CEST)
- Postal code: 48220
- ^{1} French Land Register data, which excludes lakes, ponds, glaciers > 1 km^{2} (0.386 sq mi or 247 acres) and river estuaries.

Saint-Maurice-de-Ventalon (Occitan: Sent Maurise de Ventalon) is a former commune in the Lozère department in southern France. On 1 January 2016, it was merged into the new commune of Pont-de-Montvert-Sud-Mont-Lozère. Its population was 57 in 2019.

== See also ==
- Communes of the Lozère department
