= Castanet (disambiguation) =

Castanets are a percussion instrument.

Castanet may also refer to:

== Places in France ==
- Castanet, Aveyron
- Castanet, Tarn
- Castanet, Tarn-et-Garonne
- Castanet-le-Haut, Hérault, France
- Castanet-Tolosan, Haute-Garonne, France

== People ==
- André Castanet (fl. 1900), French Olympic competitor in athletics
- Bernard de Castanet (c. 1240–1317), French bishop of the Roman Catholic Archdiocese of Albi

== Other ==
- Castanet (film), a 1945 Spanish drama film
- Castanets (band)
- Château de Castanet, Lozère, France
- Castanet, a fictional island the player resides on in the video game Harvest Moon: Animal Parade
