= Étang de Barrandon =

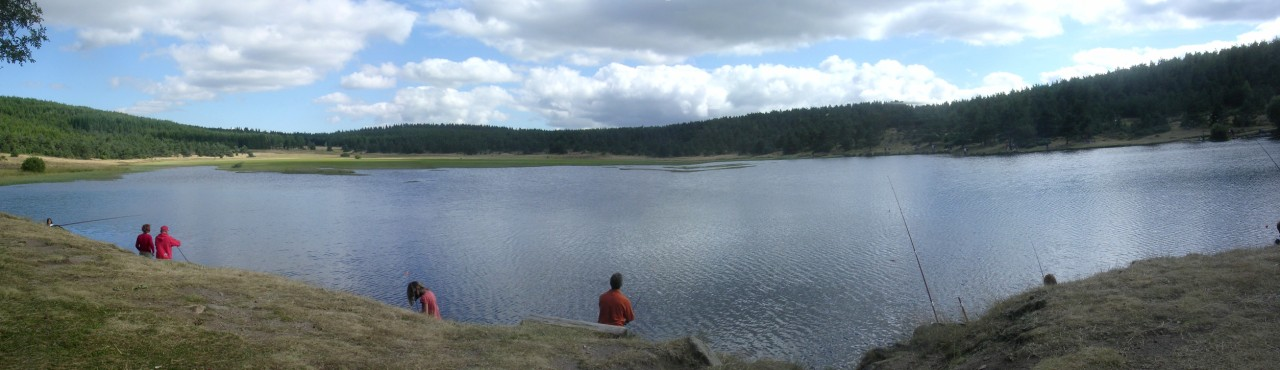

- Location within France
- Location: Lozère
- Coordinates: 44°27′10″N 3°37′0″E
- Type: Reservoir
- Primary outflows: Ruisseau de Vareilles
- Basin countries: France
- Surface area: 0.073 km^{2} (0.028 sq mi)
- Surface elevation: 1,375 m (4,511 ft)
- Islands: none

Étang de Barrandon is a lake in Saint-Étienne-du-Valdonnez, Lozère, France. At an elevation of 1375 m, its surface area is 0.073 km².
