= Le Pont-de-Montvert =

- Part of Pont-de-Montvert-Sud-Mont-Lozère
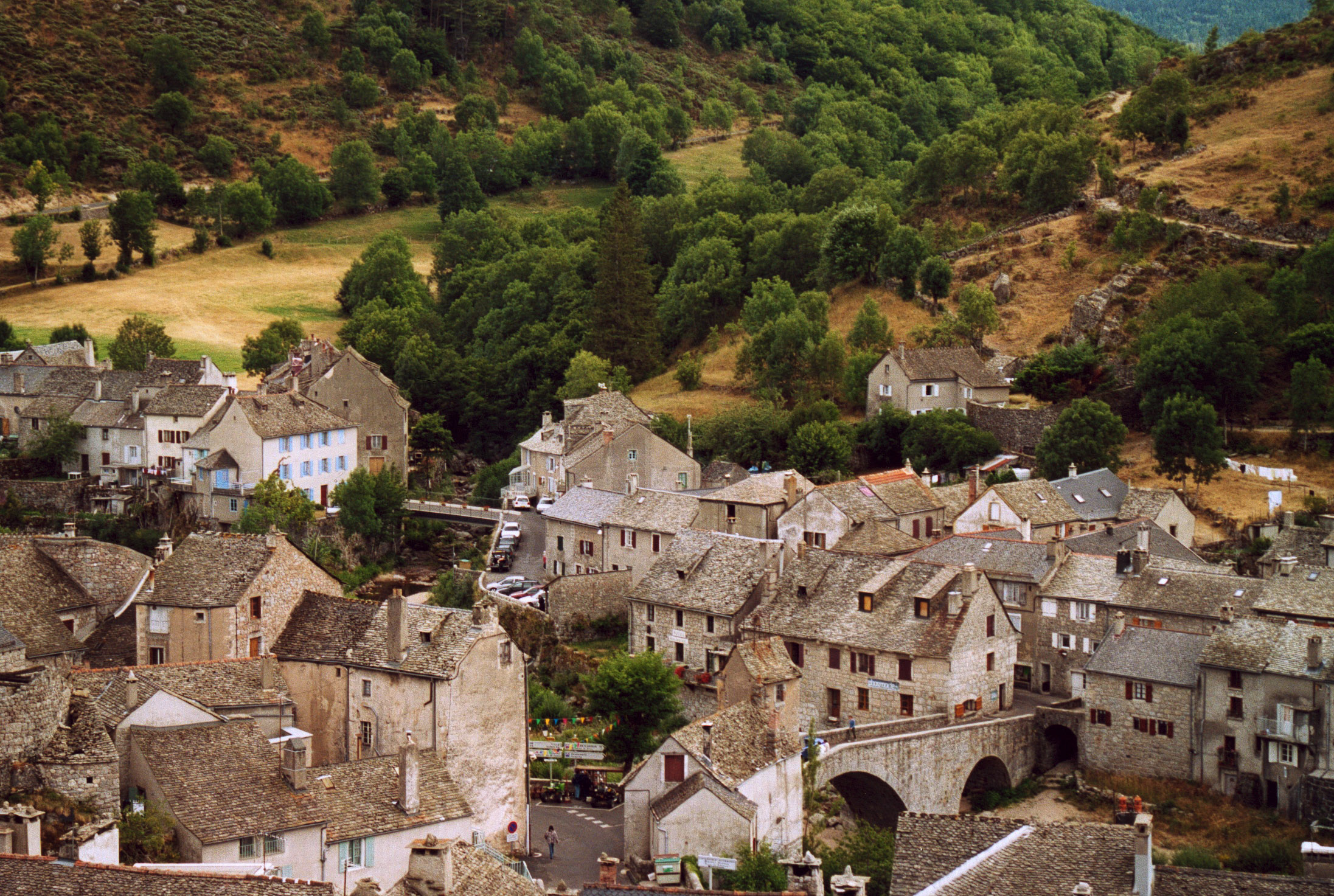
- View of Le Pont-de-Montvert

- Coat of arms
- Location of Le Pont-de-Montvert
- Location within France Location within Occitanie
- Coordinates: 44°21′51″N 3°44′40″E
- Country: France
- Region: Occitania
- Department: Lozère
- Arrondissement: Florac
- Canton: Saint-Étienne-du-Valdonnez
- Commune: Pont-de-Montvert-Sud-Mont-Lozère
- Area^{1}: 90.25 km^{2} (34.85 sq mi)
- Elevation: 875 m (2,871 ft)
- Highest elevation: 1,699 m (5,574 ft)
- Lowest elevation: 665 m (2,182 ft)
- Population (2022): 296
  - Density: 3.28/km^{2} (8.49/sq mi)
- Time zone: UTC+01:00 (CET)
  - Summer (DST): UTC+02:00 (CEST)
- Postal code: 48220
- ^{1} French Land Register data, which excludes lakes, ponds, glaciers > 1 km^{2} (0.386 sq mi or 247 acres) and river estuaries.

Le Pont-de-Montvert (French pronunciation: [lə pɔ̃ də mɔ̃vɛʁ]; Occitan: Lo Pònt de Montverd) is a former commune in the Lozère département in southern France. On 1 January 2016, it was merged into the new commune of Pont-de-Montvert-Sud-Mont-Lozère.

It is located in the heart of the Parc National des Cévennes. The inhabitants of Le Pont-de-Montvert are called Pontoises or Montvertipontains.

== History ==
Late Neolithic standing stones called the menhirs of the Cham des Bondons, the largest concentration of menhirs in the south of France, bear mute witness to the long prehistory of human occupation here. The village was a fief of the Knights Hospitaller. Guillaume de Grimoard, future pope under the name of Urban V, was born in the Château de Grizac here in 1309. The picturesquely sited structure, no larger than a farm, reveals its defensive nature by its narrow windows, perched high in its granite walls, and its four-square tower, now topless. Charles V exempted the seigneurie de Grizac from all taxes, a privilege its lords maintained until the Revolution.

In the 17th century it remained a local centre of ardent French Protestants ("Huguenots") in a traditionally highly independent region; an incident in the village, the assassination on 24 July 1702 of the repressive abbé of Chayla, François Langlade, sparked the rebellion of the Camisards. Langlade had chosen to use his house as prison; he had arrested and tortured a group of seven Protestants accused of attempting to flee France. A band of Camisards, led by Abraham Mazet, peacefully asked for the release of the prisoners, but when this was refused they slaughtered Langlade and two priests.

The Huguenot elites of the neighbouring village of Fraissinet-de-Lozère chose nevertheless to fight against the rebels. The Protestant Temple de Vialas survives in the hamlet of Vialas nearby.

== Main sights ==
The main village, Pont-de-Montvert (870 m altitude) at the base of the south-facing slopes of Mont Lozère, has retained the stony granite-built traditional aspect of its closely built centre, surrounding by outlying hamlets. The village is named for its hump-backed bridge (en dos d'âne) that spans in a single arch the swift-flowing Tarn— here near its source. The bridge is guarded by a defensive tower at the village end, now with a more amiable function: village clock. Though medieval in aspect, bridge and tower in fact date to the 17th century.

Robert Louis Stevenson passed through Pont-de-Montvert on the ramble narrated in his Travels with a Donkey in the Cévennes (1879), one of the first books to present hiking and camping as recreational activities. Today Stevenson fans retrace the route Stevenson on hiking paths (the GR 70), some of which are transhumance routes taken annually by shepherds and their flocks.

The open-air museum Ecomusée du Mont Lozère sited here presents the ecology of the region. A feature is the traditional Ferme de Troubat, with its threshing-floor and its flour mill.
