= Brenoux =

- Commune
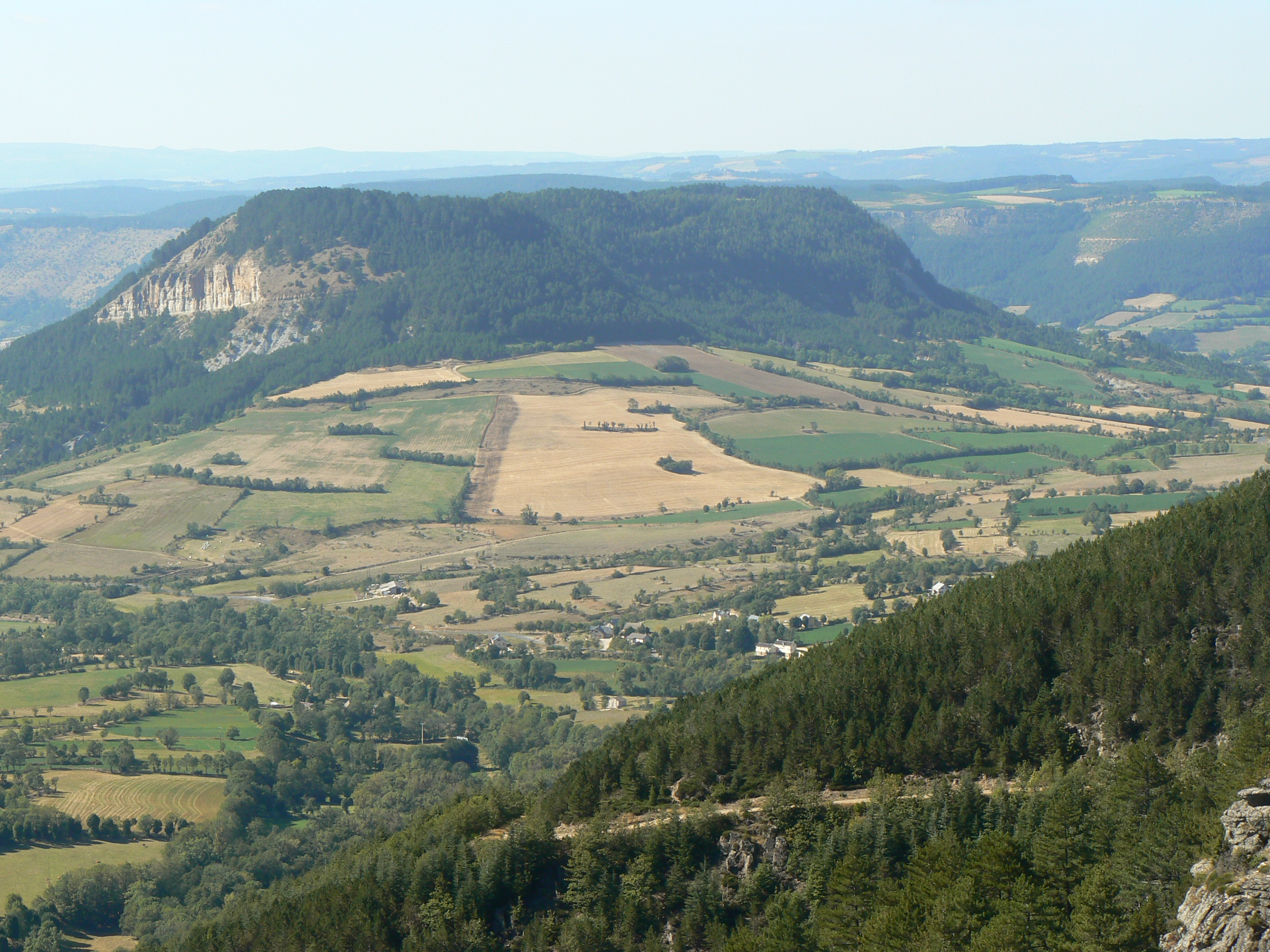
- The Truc de Balduc seen from Mont Mimat, Brenoux is in the valley to the left
- Location of Brenoux
- Location within France Location within Occitanie
- Coordinates: 44°29′03″N 3°32′02″E
- Country: France
- Region: Occitania
- Department: Lozère
- Arrondissement: Mende
- Canton: Saint-Étienne-du-Valdonnez
- Intercommunality: CC Mont Lozère

Government
  - Mayor (2020–2026): Olivier Taurisson
- Area^{1}: 11.25 km^{2} (4.34 sq mi)
- Elevation: 735 m (2,411 ft)
- Highest elevation: 1,082 m (3,550 ft)
- Lowest elevation: 729 m (2,392 ft)
- Population (2023): 384
  - Density: 34.1/km^{2} (88.4/sq mi)
- Time zone: UTC+01:00 (CET)
  - Summer (DST): UTC+02:00 (CEST)
- INSEE/Postal code: 48030 /48000
- ^{1} French Land Register data, which excludes lakes, ponds, glaciers > 1 km^{2} (0.386 sq mi or 247 acres) and river estuaries.

Brenoux (French pronunciation: [bʁənu]; Occitan: Brenosc) is a commune in the Lozère department in southern France.

== Population ==
Historical population
Year	Pop.	±% p.a.
1968	173	—
1975	148	−2.21%
1982	173	+2.25%
1990	260	+5.22%
1999	304	+1.75%
2007	296	−0.33%
2012	367	+4.39%
2017	382	+0.80%
2023	384	+0.09%
Source: INSEE

== See also ==
- Communes of the Lozère department
