= Vialas =

- Commune
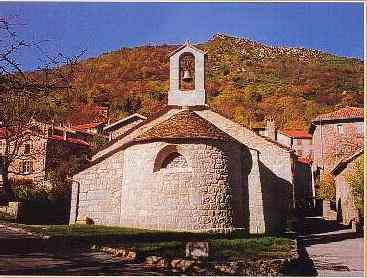
- Protestant church in Vialas

- Coat of arms
- Location of Vialas
- Location within France Location within Occitanie
- Coordinates: 44°20′04″N 3°53′48″E
- Country: France
- Region: Occitania
- Department: Lozère
- Arrondissement: Florac
- Canton: Saint-Étienne-du-Valdonnez

Government
  - Mayor (2020–2026): Michel Reydon
- Area^{1}: 49.77 km^{2} (19.22 sq mi)
- Elevation: 610 m (2,000 ft)
- Highest elevation: 1,509 m (4,951 ft)
- Lowest elevation: 335 m (1,099 ft)
- Population (2023): 447
  - Density: 8.98/km^{2} (23.3/sq mi)
- Time zone: UTC+01:00 (CET)
  - Summer (DST): UTC+02:00 (CEST)
- INSEE/Postal code: 48194 /48220
- ^{1} French Land Register data, which excludes lakes, ponds, glaciers > 1 km^{2} (0.386 sq mi or 247 acres) and river estuaries.

Vialas (French pronunciation: [vjalas]; Occitan: Vialars) is a commune in the Lozère department in southern France.

== Population ==
Historical population

Year	Pop.	±% p.a.
1793	1,550	—
1800	1,709	+1.40%
1806	1,790	+0.77%
1821	2,051	+0.91%
1831	2,041	−0.05%
1836	2,130	+0.86%
1841	2,126	−0.04%
1846	1,990	−1.31%
1851	2,005	+0.15%
1856	1,980	−0.25%
1861	2,299	+3.03%
1866	2,448	+1.26%
1872	2,310	−0.96%
1876	2,152	−1.76%
1881	2,096	−0.53%
1886	2,002	−0.91%
1891	1,720	−2.99%
1896	1,463	−3.18%
1901	1,359	−1.46%

Year	Pop.	±% p.a.
1906	1,285	−1.11%
1911	1,179	−1.71%
1921	890	−2.77%
1926	848	−0.96%
1931	796	−1.26%
1936	809	+0.32%
1946	617	−2.67%
1954	507	−2.42%
1962	478	−0.73%
1968	352	−4.97%
1975	304	−2.07%
1982	356	+2.28%
1990	384	+0.95%
1999	425	+1.13%
2007	420	−0.15%
2012	440	+0.93%
2017	432	−0.37%
2023	447	+0.57%

Source: EHESS and INSEE

== See also ==
- Communes of the Lozère department
