= Lanuéjols, Lozère =

Lanuéjols
- Commune
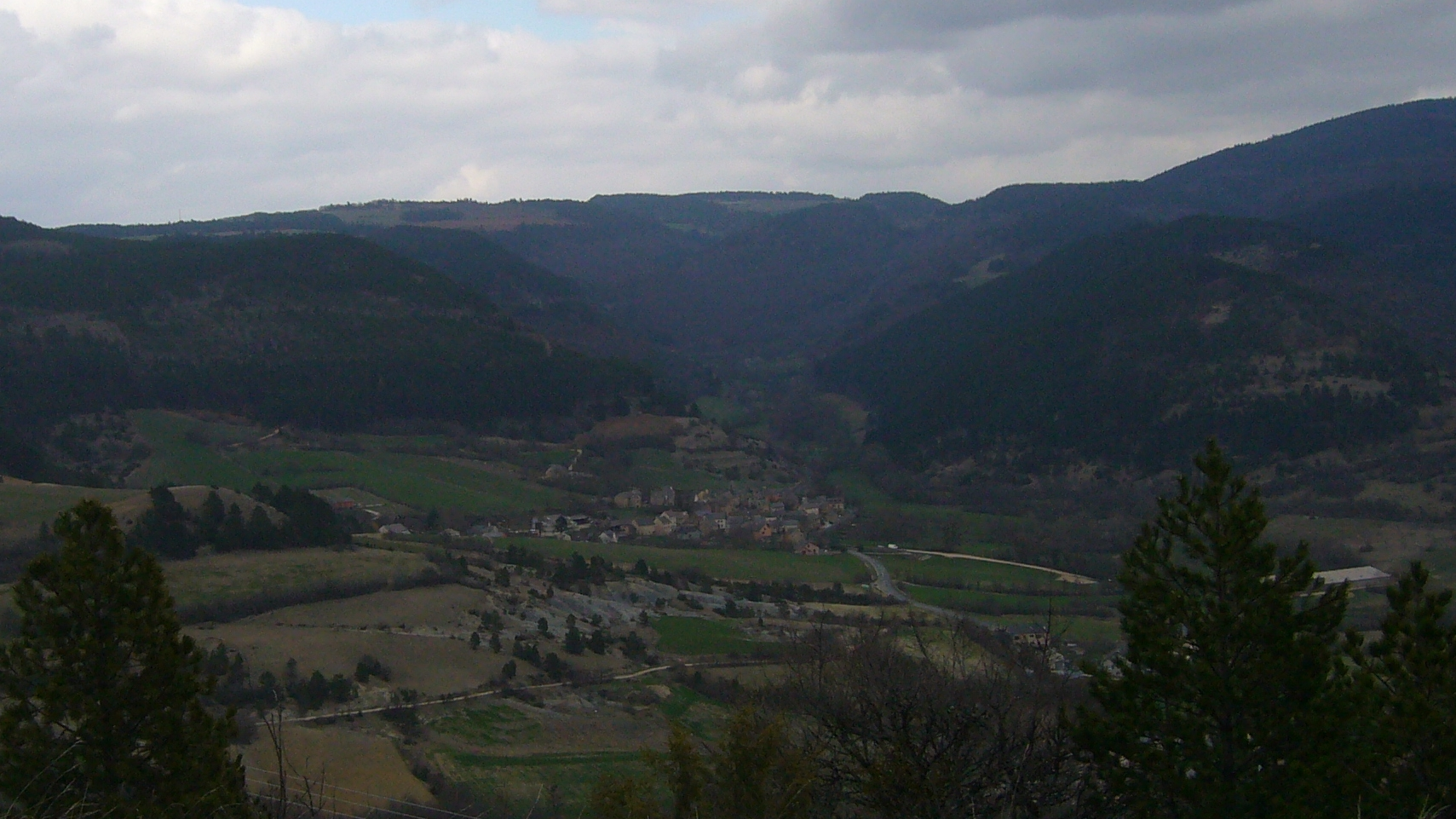
- A general view of Lanuéjols, from Mont Mimat
- Location of Lanuéjols
- Location within France Location within Occitanie
- Coordinates: 44°30′06″N 3°34′23″E
- Country: France
- Region: Occitania
- Department: Lozère
- Arrondissement: Mende
- Canton: Saint-Étienne-du-Valdonnez
- Intercommunality: CC Mont Lozère

Government
  - Mayor (2020–2026): Christian Brugeron
- Area^{1}: 32.67 km^{2} (12.61 sq mi)
- Elevation: 875 m (2,871 ft)
- Highest elevation: 1,421 m (4,662 ft)
- Lowest elevation: 778 m (2,552 ft)
- Population (2023): 373
  - Density: 11.4/km^{2} (29.6/sq mi)
- Time zone: UTC+01:00 (CET)
  - Summer (DST): UTC+02:00 (CEST)
- INSEE/Postal code: 48081 /48000
- ^{1} French Land Register data, which excludes lakes, ponds, glaciers > 1 km^{2} (0.386 sq mi or 247 acres) and river estuaries.

Lanuéjols (French pronunciation: [lanɥeʒɔl]; Occitan: Lanuèjols [laˈnjɛ.dʒos]) is a commune in the Lozère department in southern France.

== See also ==
- Communes of the Lozère department
- Mausoleum of Lanuéjols
