= Saint-Bauzile, Lozère =

Saint-Bauzile
- Commune
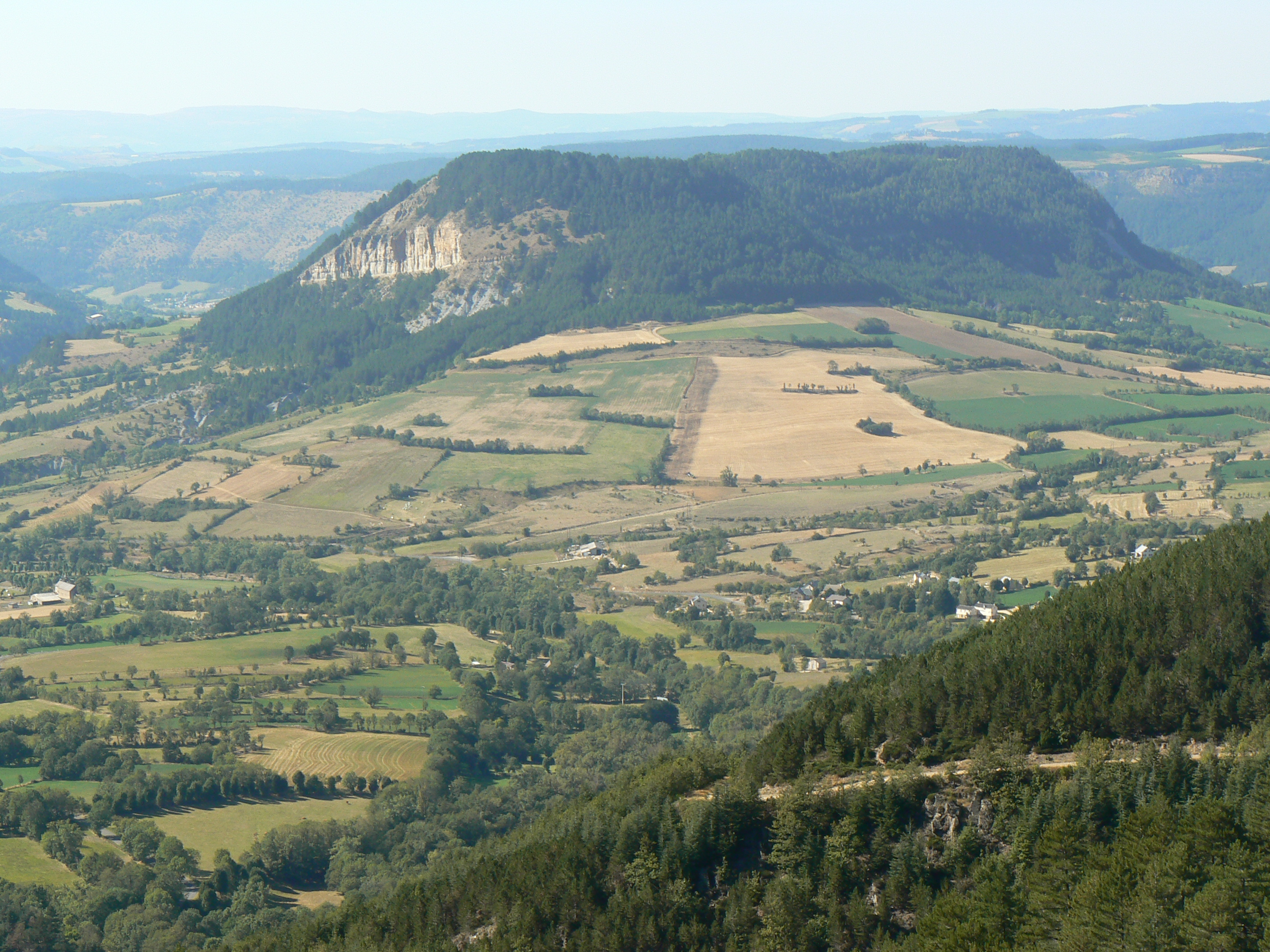
- The Truc de Balduc seen from Mont Mimat
- Location of Saint-Bauzile
- Location within France Location within Occitanie
- Coordinates: 44°28′58″N 3°30′11″E
- Country: France
- Region: Occitania
- Department: Lozère
- Arrondissement: Mende
- Canton: Saint-Étienne-du-Valdonnez
- Intercommunality: CC Cœur de Lozère

Government
  - Mayor (2020–2026): Didier Couderc
- Area^{1}: 29.33 km^{2} (11.32 sq mi)
- Elevation: 720 m (2,360 ft)
- Highest elevation: 1,110 m (3,640 ft)
- Lowest elevation: 687 m (2,254 ft)
- Population (2023): 585
  - Density: 19.9/km^{2} (51.7/sq mi)
- Time zone: UTC+01:00 (CET)
  - Summer (DST): UTC+02:00 (CEST)
- INSEE/Postal code: 48137 /48000
- ^{1} French Land Register data, which excludes lakes, ponds, glaciers > 1 km^{2} (0.386 sq mi or 247 acres) and river estuaries.

Saint-Bauzile (French pronunciation: [sɛ̃ bozil]; Occitan: Sent Bausèli) is a commune in the Lozère department in southern France.

== See also ==
- Communes of the Lozère department
