= Saint-André-Capcèze =

- Commune
- Coat of arms
- Location of Saint-André-Capcèze
- Location within France Location within Occitanie
- Coordinates: 44°25′04″N 3°56′58″E
- Country: France
- Region: Occitania
- Department: Lozère
- Arrondissement: Mende
- Canton: Saint-Étienne-du-Valdonnez
- Intercommunality: CC Mont Lozère

Government
  - Mayor (2020–2026): Jean de Lescure
- Area^{1}: 9.85 km^{2} (3.80 sq mi)
- Elevation: 450 m (1,480 ft)
- Highest elevation: 1,087 m (3,566 ft)
- Lowest elevation: 423 m (1,388 ft)
- Population (2023): 206
  - Density: 20.9/km^{2} (54.2/sq mi)
- Time zone: UTC+01:00 (CET)
  - Summer (DST): UTC+02:00 (CEST)
- INSEE/Postal code: 48135 /48800
- ^{1} French Land Register data, which excludes lakes, ponds, glaciers > 1 km^{2} (0.386 sq mi or 247 acres) and river estuaries.

Saint-André-Capcèze (French pronunciation: [sɛ̃.t‿ɑ̃dʁe kapsɛz]; Occitan: Sent Andrieu de Cap a Cèse) is a commune in the Lozère department in southern France.

== See also ==
- Communes of the Lozère department
