= Pont-de-Montvert-Sud-Mont-Lozère =

- Commune
- Location of Pont-de-Montvert-Sud-Mont-Lozère
- Location within France Location within Occitanie
- Coordinates: 44°21′50″N 3°44′42″E
- Country: France
- Region: Occitania
- Department: Lozère
- Arrondissement: Florac
- Canton: Saint-Étienne-du-Valdonnez
- Area^{1}: 167.34 km^{2} (64.61 sq mi)
- Population (2023): 557
  - Density: 3.33/km^{2} (8.62/sq mi)
- Time zone: UTC+01:00 (CET)
  - Summer (DST): UTC+02:00 (CEST)
- INSEE/Postal code: 48116 /48220
- ^{1} French Land Register data, which excludes lakes, ponds, glaciers > 1 km^{2} (0.386 sq mi or 247 acres) and river estuaries.

Pont-de-Montvert-Sud-Mont-Lozère is a commune in the department of Lozère, southern France. The municipality was established on 1 January 2016 by merger of the former communes of Le Pont-de-Montvert, Fraissinet-de-Lozère and Saint-Maurice-de-Ventalon.

== See also ==
- Communes of the Lozère department
