= Altier =

- Commune
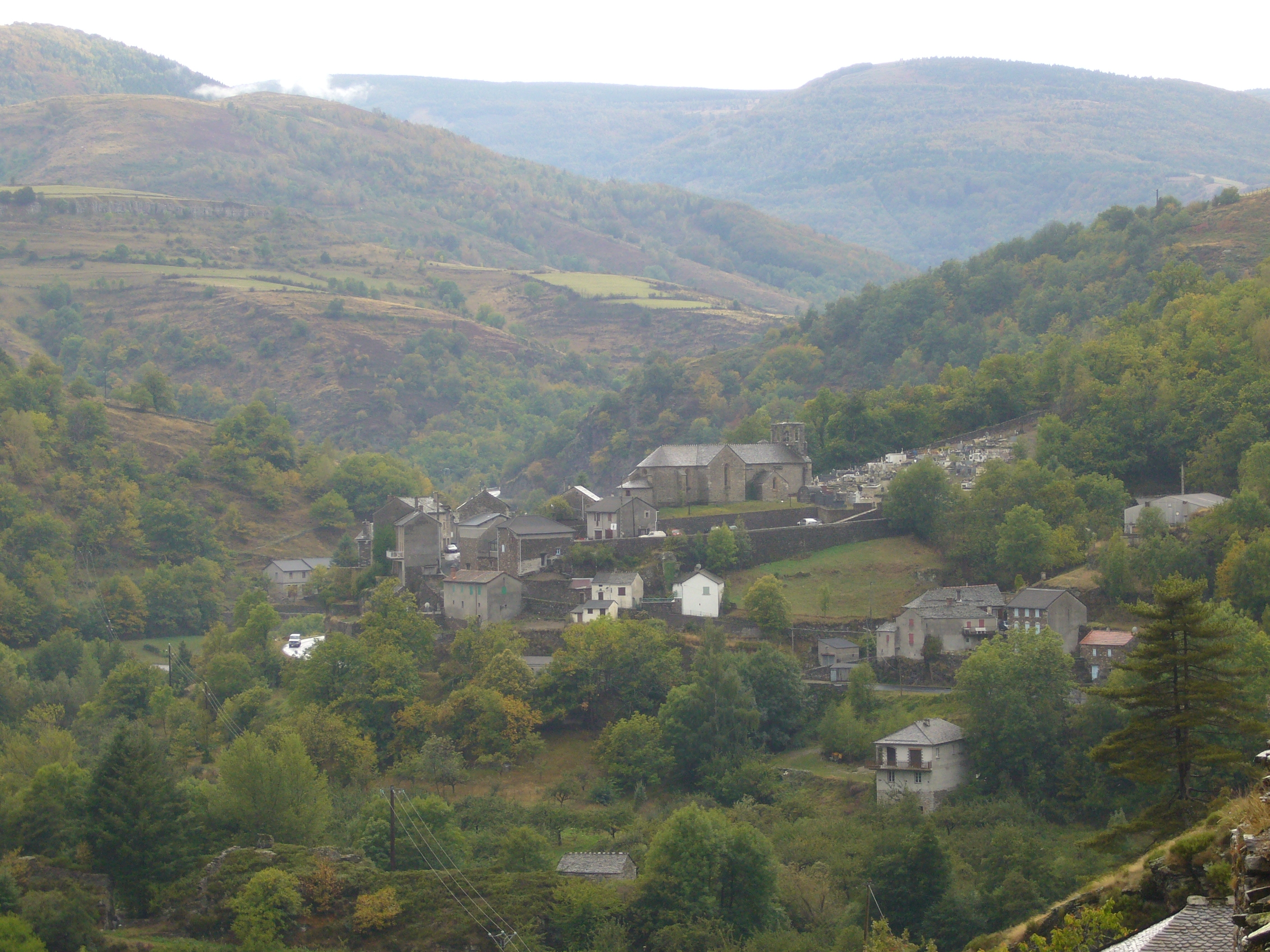
- A view of Altier, seen from the nearby hillside

- Coat of arms
- Location of Altier
- Location within France Location within Occitanie
- Coordinates: 44°28′30″N 3°51′44″E
- Country: France
- Region: Occitania
- Department: Lozère
- Arrondissement: Mende
- Canton: Saint-Étienne-du-Valdonnez
- Intercommunality: CC Mont Lozère

Government
  - Mayor (2020–2026): Jean-Louis Balme
- Area^{1}: 54.45 km^{2} (21.02 sq mi)
- Elevation: 725 m (2,379 ft)
- Highest elevation: 1,678 m (5,505 ft)
- Lowest elevation: 616 m (2,021 ft)
- Population (2023): 213
  - Density: 3.91/km^{2} (10.1/sq mi)
- Time zone: UTC+01:00 (CET)
  - Summer (DST): UTC+02:00 (CEST)
- INSEE/Postal code: 48004 /48800
- ^{1} French Land Register data, which excludes lakes, ponds, glaciers > 1 km^{2} (0.386 sq mi or 247 acres) and river estuaries.

Altier (French pronunciation: [altje]; Occitan: Altièr) is a commune in the Lozère department in southern France.

== Population ==
Historical population
Year	Pop.	±% p.a.
1968	360	—
1975	276	−3.72%
1982	246	−1.63%
1990	243	−0.15%
1999	207	−1.77%
2007	214	+0.42%
2012	207	−0.66%
2017	202	−0.49%
2023	213	+0.89%
Source: INSEE

== See also ==
- Communes of the Lozère department
