= Les Bondons =

- Commune
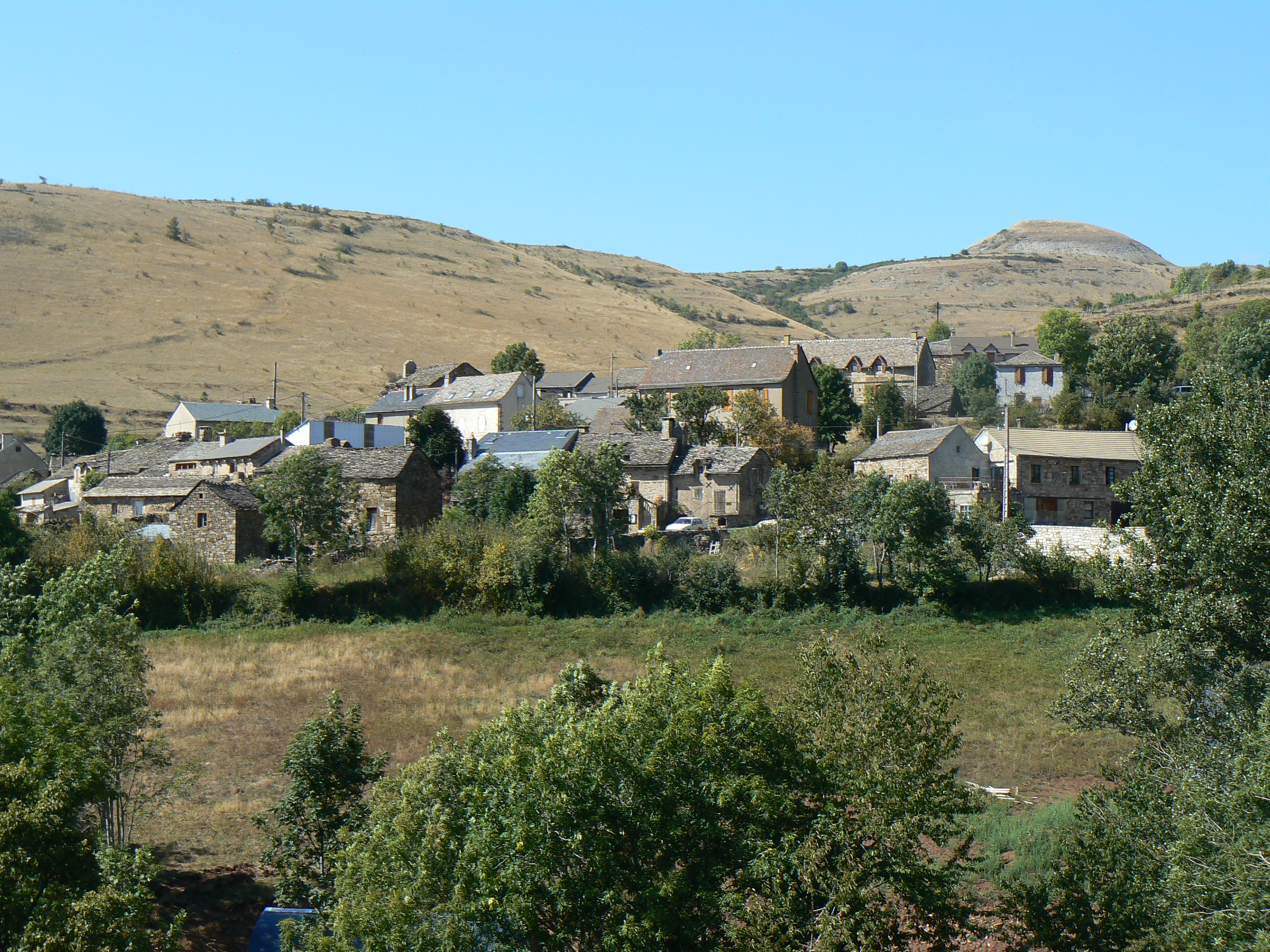
- A general view of Les Bondons
- Location of Les Bondons
- Location within France Location within Occitanie
- Coordinates: 44°23′14″N 3°37′12″E
- Country: France
- Region: Occitania
- Department: Lozère
- Arrondissement: Florac
- Canton: Saint-Étienne-du-Valdonnez
- Intercommunality: CC Gorges Causses Cévennes

Government
  - Mayor (2020–2026): Francis Durand
- Area^{1}: 45.54 km^{2} (17.58 sq mi)
- Elevation: 863 m (2,831 ft)
- Highest elevation: 1,569 m (5,148 ft)
- Lowest elevation: 600 m (2,000 ft)
- Population (2023): 139
  - Density: 3.05/km^{2} (7.91/sq mi)
- Time zone: UTC+01:00 (CET)
  - Summer (DST): UTC+02:00 (CEST)
- INSEE/Postal code: 48028 /48400
- ^{1} French Land Register data, which excludes lakes, ponds, glaciers > 1 km^{2} (0.386 sq mi or 247 acres) and river estuaries.

Les Bondons (French pronunciation: [le bɔ̃dɔ̃]; Occitan: Los Bondons) is a commune in the Lozère department in southern France.

== Population ==
Historical population
Year	Pop.	±% p.a.
1968	230	—
1975	234	+0.25%
1982	194	−2.64%
1990	159	−2.46%
1999	150	−0.65%
2007	139	−0.95%
2012	142	+0.43%
2017	141	−0.14%
2023	139	−0.24%
Source: INSEE

== See also ==
- Communes of the Lozère department
