= Pourcharesses =

- Commune
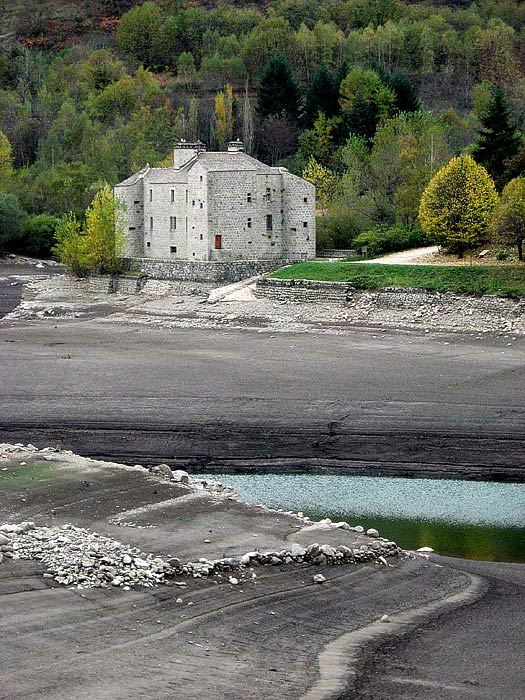
- The Château de Castanet, in Pourcharesses
- Location of Pourcharesses
- Location within France Location within Occitanie
- Coordinates: 44°28′21″N 3°55′07″E
- Country: France
- Region: Occitania
- Department: Lozère
- Arrondissement: Mende
- Canton: Saint-Étienne-du-Valdonnez
- Intercommunality: CC Mont Lozère

Government
  - Mayor (2022–2026): Audrey Malaval
- Area^{1}: 31.79 km^{2} (12.27 sq mi)
- Elevation: 600 m (2,000 ft)
- Highest elevation: 1,662 m (5,453 ft)
- Lowest elevation: 600 m (2,000 ft)
- Population (2023): 130
  - Density: 4.1/km^{2} (11/sq mi)
- Time zone: UTC+01:00 (CET)
  - Summer (DST): UTC+02:00 (CEST)
- INSEE/Postal code: 48117 /48800
- ^{1} French Land Register data, which excludes lakes, ponds, glaciers > 1 km^{2} (0.386 sq mi or 247 acres) and river estuaries.

Pourcharesses (French pronunciation: [puʁʃaʁɛs]; Occitan: Porchareças) is a commune in the Lozère department in southern France.

== See also ==
- Communes of the Lozère department
