= Saint-Étienne-du-Valdonnez =

- Commune
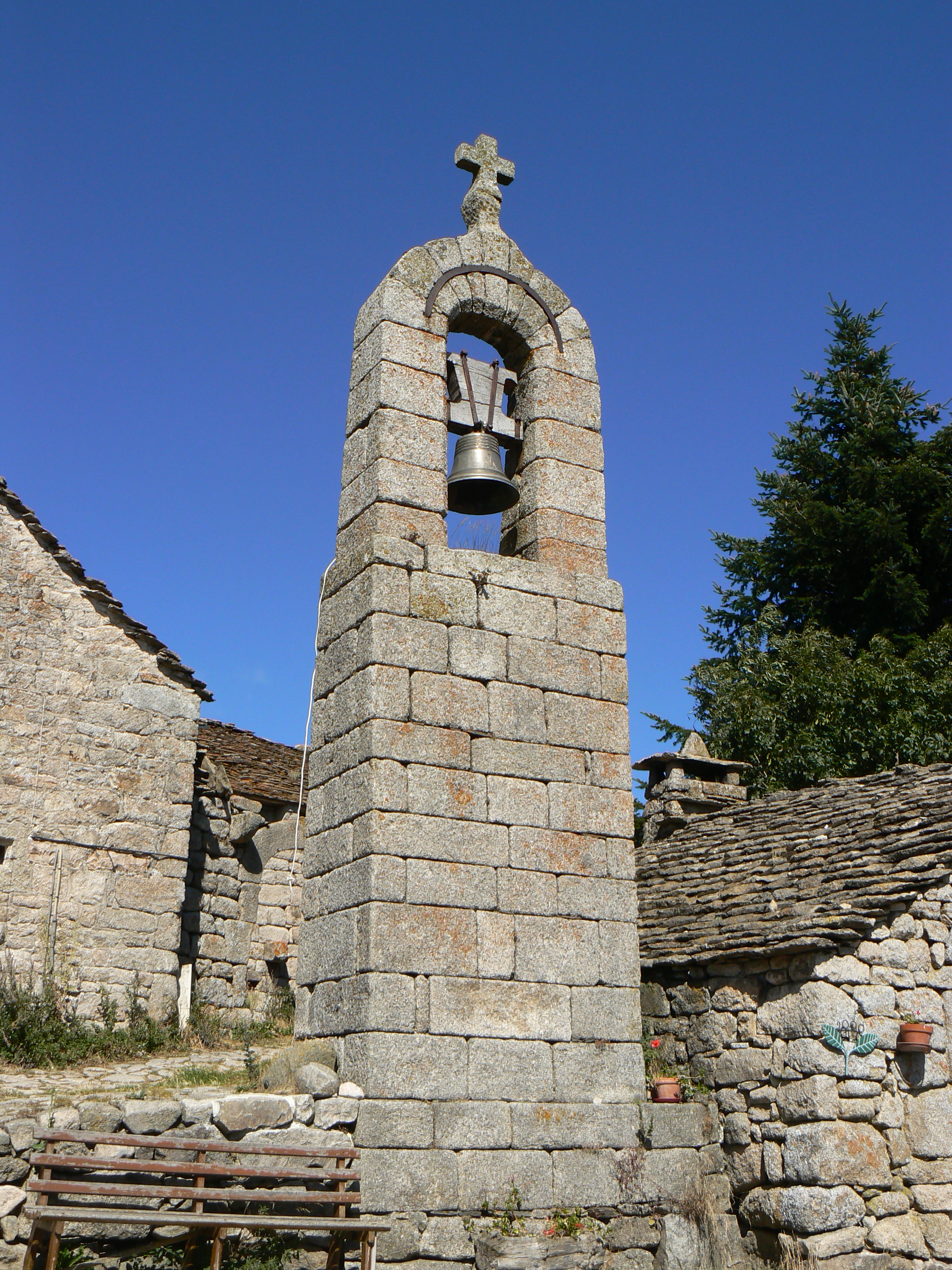
- The warning bell of the hamlet of La Fage, in Saint-Etienne-du-Valdonnez
- Location of Saint-Étienne-du-Valdonnez
- Location within France Location within Occitanie
- Coordinates: 44°27′23″N 3°33′48″E
- Country: France
- Region: Occitania
- Department: Lozère
- Arrondissement: Mende
- Canton: Saint-Étienne-du-Valdonnez

Government
  - Mayor (2020–2026): Benoit Malaval
- Area^{1}: 56.09 km^{2} (21.66 sq mi)
- Elevation: 808 m (2,651 ft)
- Highest elevation: 1,557 m (5,108 ft)
- Lowest elevation: 754 m (2,474 ft)
- Population (2023): 644
  - Density: 11.5/km^{2} (29.7/sq mi)
- Time zone: UTC+01:00 (CET)
  - Summer (DST): UTC+02:00 (CEST)
- INSEE/Postal code: 48147 /48000
- ^{1} French Land Register data, which excludes lakes, ponds, glaciers > 1 km^{2} (0.386 sq mi or 247 acres) and river estuaries.

Saint-Étienne-du-Valdonnez (French pronunciation: [sɛ̃.t‿etjɛn dy valdɔne]; Occitan: Sent Estève) is a commune in the Lozère department in southern France.

== Demographics ==
Historical population
Year	Pop.	±% p.a.
1968	405	—
1975	355	−1.86%
1982	383	+1.09%
1990	384	+0.03%
1999	469	+2.25%
2007	608	+3.30%
2012	648	+1.28%
2017	647	−0.03%
2023	644	−0.08%
Source: INSEE

== See also ==
- Communes of the Lozère department
