= Château de Castanet =

Château in Lozère, France

Château of Castanet
- Château de Castanet
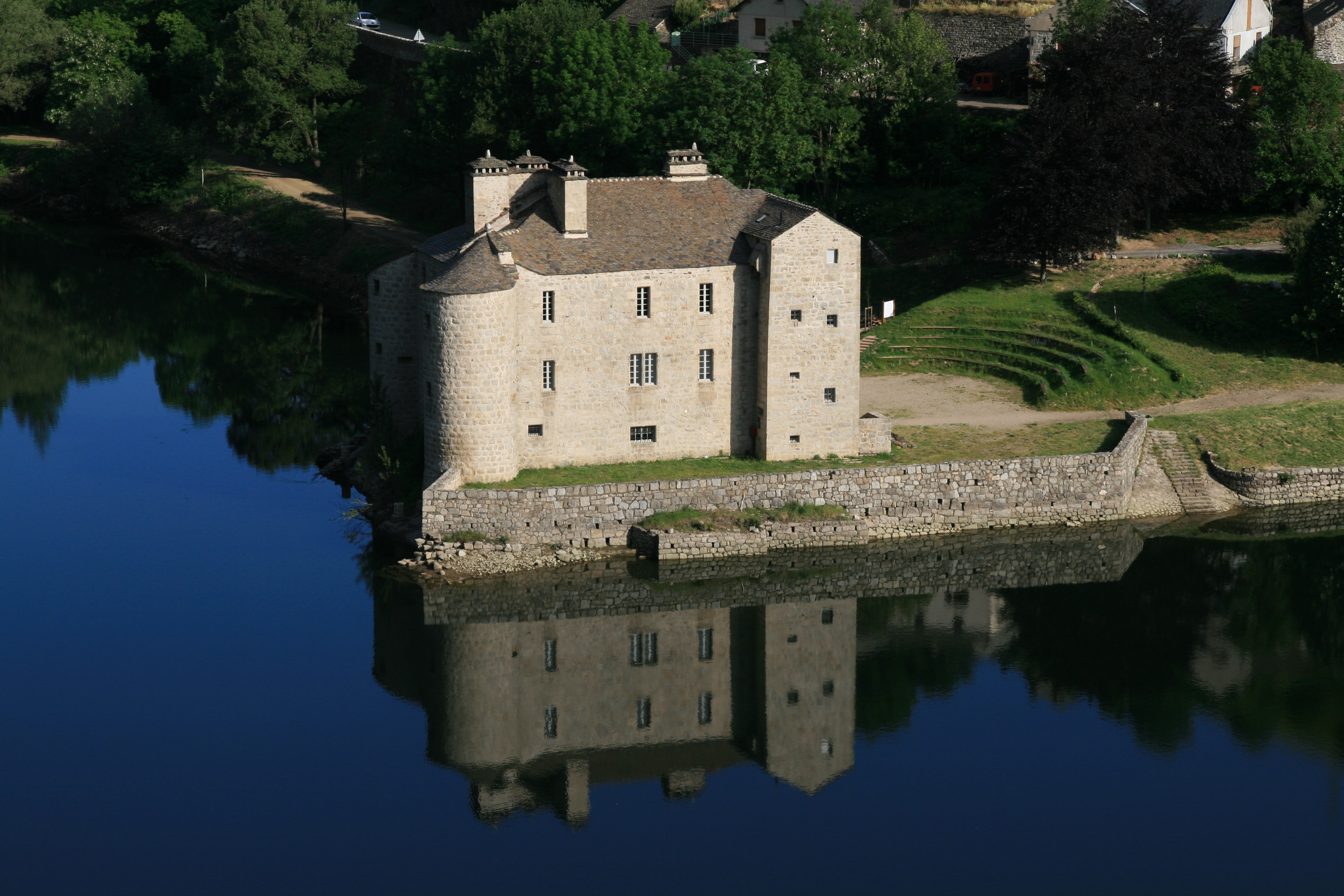

General information
- Coordinates: 44°27′01″N 3°53′54″E

Website
- www.villefort-cevennes.com

The Château of Castanet is a French château built in the 16th century in Pourcharesses near Villefort in Lozère, France.

== Overview ==
The territory of Castanet has its origin of its name ("chestnut") in the Occitan language, as chestnut trees are the most common tree in the territory. The château is next to the lake of Villefort, an artificial lake created behind a dam, whose company went bankrupt building the dam.

== History ==
The château was built in 1578 by Jacques Isarn, a noble of Villefort. This family continued to grow in importance until marriage to a descendant by Marie-Suzanne de Varicourt, Marquise de Villefort, nourisher and savior of the future King of France Louis XV. This event led the family to move to Versailles.

It was sold in 1760 and after the emigration of the last owner, it was sold again as a national asset during the French Revolution. After that, the château belonged to farmers.

In 1962, the national company Electricité de France decided to build a dam in the valley. It expropriated the chateau from the last owners and planned to destroy the château but the villagers revolted and entered the château to make an Inventory of Historical Monuments. In 1964, the E.D.F. assigned the monument to the community of communes of Villefort. The château was reinforced to protect it from dangers of the lake.

In 2000, a fire destroyed the château but after extensive renovation, it reopened its doors in 2006. It now hosts a permanent exhibition on the history of the region and temporary exhibitions of artists and craftsmen.
