= Canton of Saint-Étienne-du-Valdonnez =

Coordinates: 44.46°N 3.56°E

The canton of Saint-Étienne-du-Valdonnez is an administrative division of the Lozère department, southern France. It was created at the French canton reorganisation which came into effect in March 2015. Its seat is in Saint-Étienne-du-Valdonnez.

It consists of the following communes:

1. Altier
2. La Bastide-Puylaurent
3. Bédouès-Cocurès
4. Les Bondons
5. Brenoux
6. Cubières
7. Cubiérettes
8. Lanuéjols
9. Mont Lozère et Goulet
10. Pied-de-Borne
11. Pont-de-Montvert-Sud-Mont-Lozère
12. Pourcharesses
13. Prévenchères
14. Saint-André-Capcèze
15. Saint-Bauzile
16. Saint-Étienne-du-Valdonnez
17. Vialas
18. Villefort
