= Esclanèdes =

- Commune
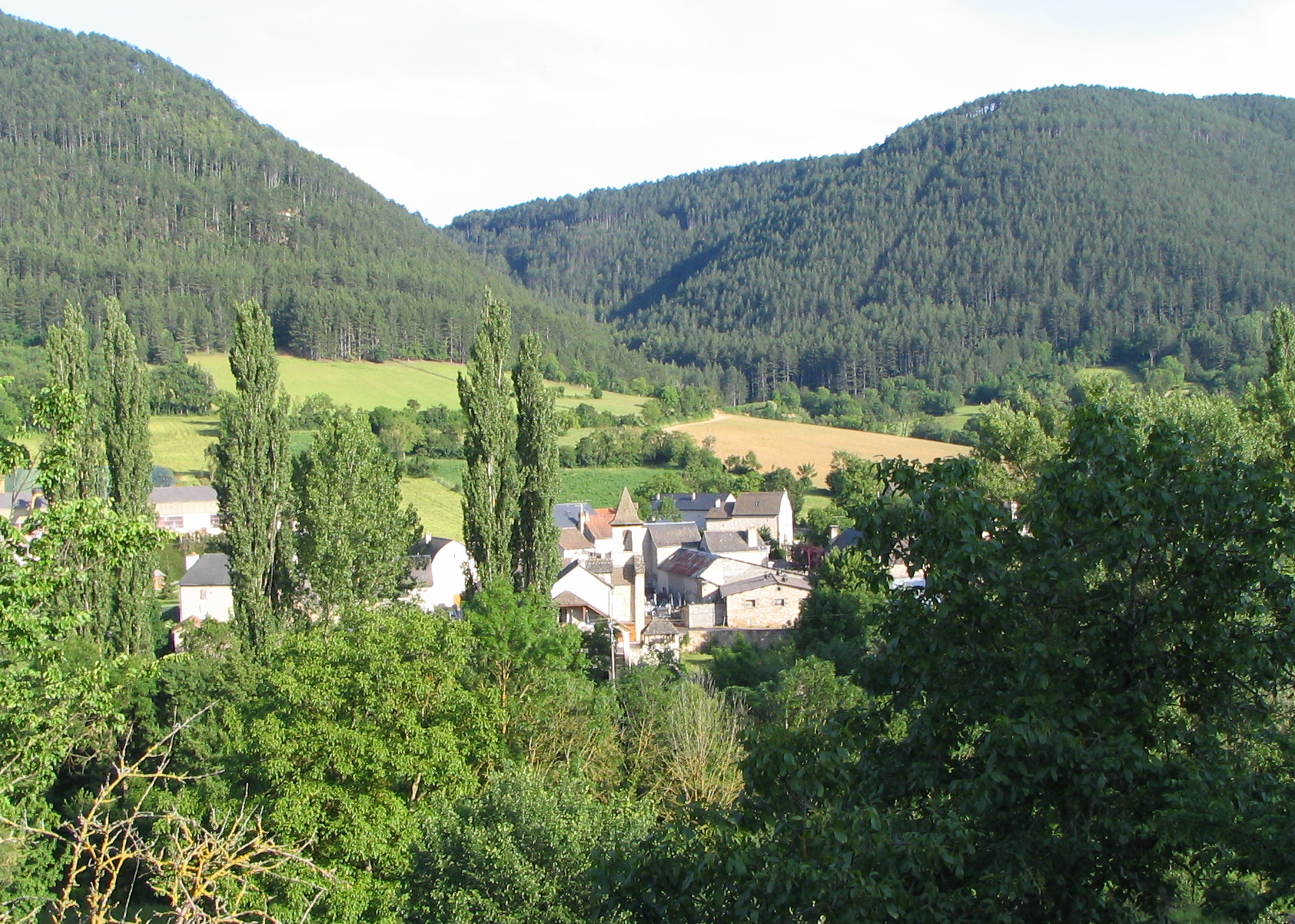
- Esclanèdes in the Lot valley
- Location of Esclanèdes
- Location within France Location within Occitanie
- Coordinates: 44°28′57″N 3°21′44″E
- Country: France
- Region: Occitania
- Department: Lozère
- Arrondissement: Mende
- Canton: Bourgs sur Colagne

Government
  - Mayor (2020–2026): Pascale Bonicel
- Area^{1}: 12.51 km^{2} (4.83 sq mi)
- Elevation: 643 m (2,110 ft)
- Highest elevation: 1,001 m (3,284 ft)
- Lowest elevation: 627 m (2,057 ft)
- Population (2023): 427
  - Density: 34.1/km^{2} (88.4/sq mi)
- Time zone: UTC+01:00 (CET)
  - Summer (DST): UTC+02:00 (CEST)
- INSEE/Postal code: 48056 /48230
- ^{1} French Land Register data, which excludes lakes, ponds, glaciers > 1 km^{2} (0.386 sq mi or 247 acres) and river estuaries.

Esclanèdes (French pronunciation: [ɛsklanɛd]; Occitan: Esclanedes) is a commune in the Lozère department in southern France.

Its inhabitants are known as Esclanédiens.

== Geography ==
The main part of the commune is located in the Lot valley, whereas the rest is on the Causse of Sauveterre. The town hall is located in the biggest burg called Le Bruel, on the north side of the river. Esclanèdes is named after the burg situated on the north side and where is located the church. Other inhabited places are the small burgs of Les Crottes et la Rocherousse and the two farms of Marance and Le Mazet.

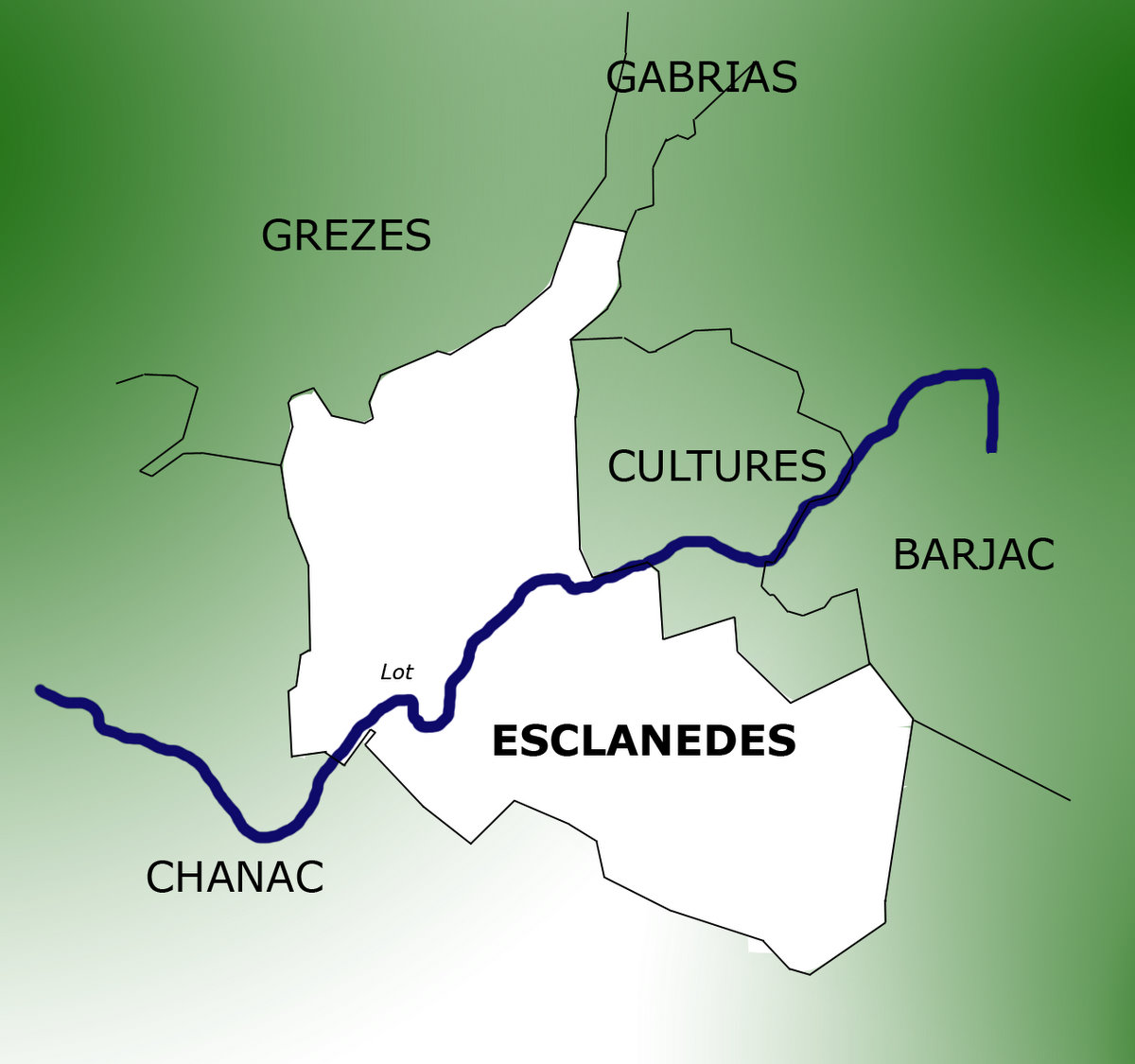
Limits of the commune of Esclanèdes

The adjoining communes are the following:

- Chanac on the southwest side
- Grèzes on the north side
- Cultures on the east side
- Gabrias on the northeast side
- Barjac on the northeast and southeast sides

== Administration ==
The current mayor is Pascale Bonicel, elected in 2020.

== Demographics ==
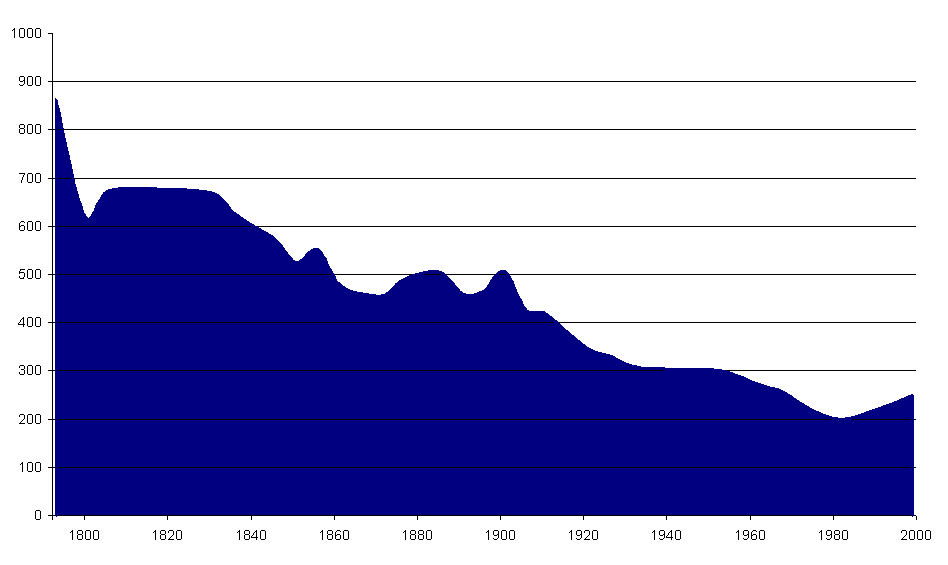
Evolution of the population of Esclanèdes since 1793

Between 1990 and 1999:

- Population in 1990: 217
- Population in 1999: 250
- Natural increase: - 2
- Net migration: + 35
- Population growth: + 33
- Average variation rate of the population by year: +1,5%

== See also ==
- Communes of the Lozère department

== Sights ==
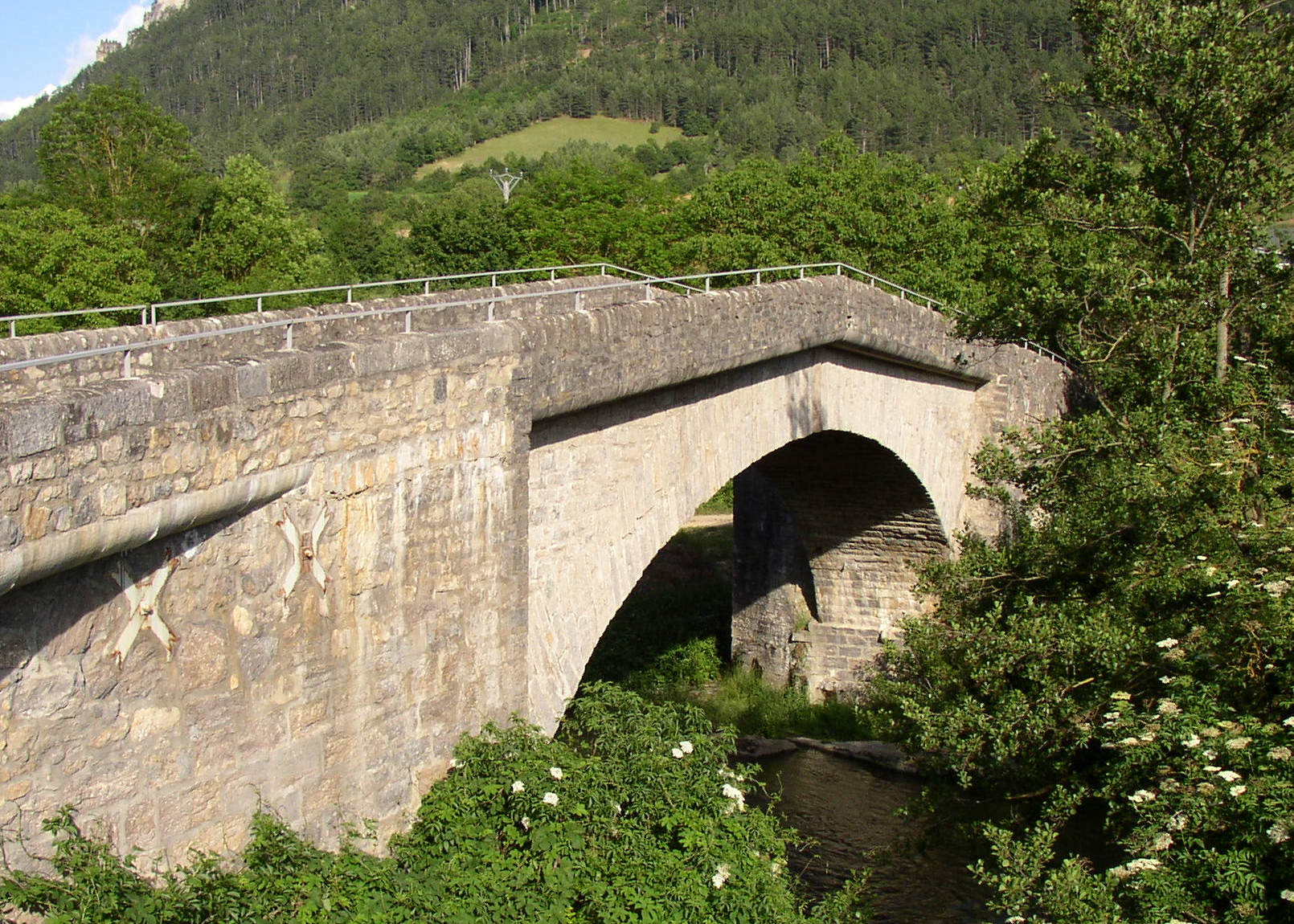
Esclanèdes bridge

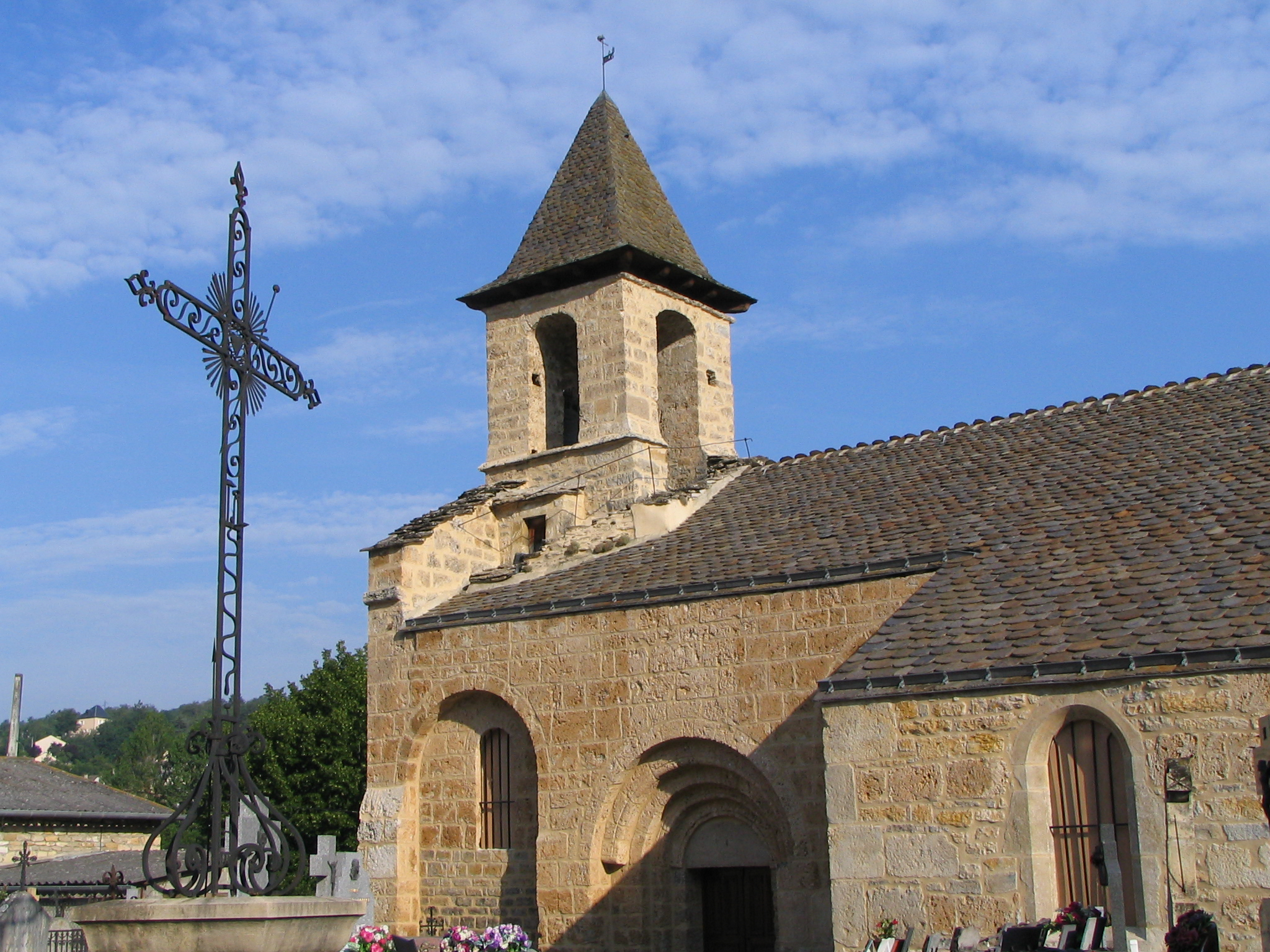
Saint-Hippolyte church
