= Chirac (disambiguation) =

Jacques Chirac (1932–2019) was the 22nd President of France and Prime Minister of France.

Chirac may also refer to:

- Bernadette Chirac (1933–2026), wife of Jacques Chirac
- Their two daughters, Claude Chirac (born 1962) and Laurence (1958–2016)

Chirac is also the name or part of the name of several communes in France:

- Chirac, Charente, in the Charente department
- Chirac, Lozère, in the Lozère department
- Chirac-Bellevue, in the Corrèze department
- Saint-Bonnet-de-Chirac, in the Lozère department

== See also ==
- "Chiraq", a nickname of Chicago
- Chi-Raq, 2015 film set in Chicago and revolves around its street gangs
