= Le Monastier-Pin-Moriès =

- Part of Bourgs-sur-Colagne
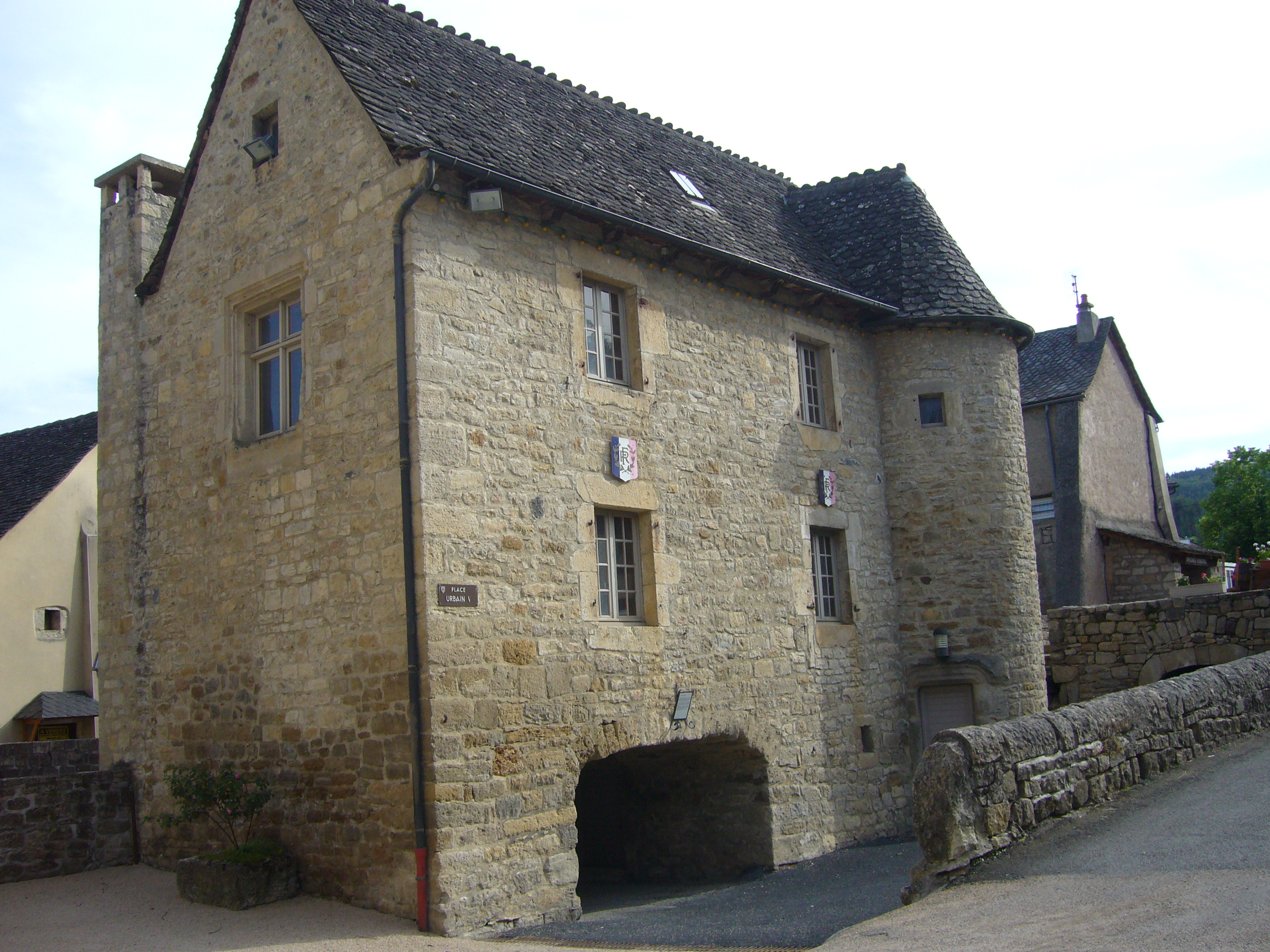
- The former house of the prior, now the town hall

- Coat of arms
- Location of Le Monastier-Pin-Moriès
- Location within France Location within Occitanie
- Coordinates: 44°30′56″N 3°15′19″E
- Country: France
- Region: Occitania
- Department: Lozère
- Arrondissement: Mende
- Canton: Chirac
- Commune: Bourgs-sur-Colagne
- Area^{1}: 19.30 km^{2} (7.45 sq mi)
- Elevation: 610 m (2,000 ft)
- Highest elevation: 1,053 m (3,455 ft)
- Lowest elevation: 570 m (1,870 ft)
- Population (2022): 942
  - Density: 48.8/km^{2} (126/sq mi)
- Time zone: UTC+01:00 (CET)
  - Summer (DST): UTC+02:00 (CEST)
- Postal code: 48100
- ^{1} French Land Register data, which excludes lakes, ponds, glaciers > 1 km^{2} (0.386 sq mi or 247 acres) and river estuaries.

Le Monastier-Pin-Moriès (French pronunciation: [lə mɔnastje pɛ̃ mɔʁjɛs]; Occitan: Lo Monastièr) is a former commune in the Lozère département in southern France. It was created in 1974 by the merger of two former communes: Le Monastier and Pin-Moriès. On 1 January 2016, it was merged into the new commune of Bourgs-sur-Colagne.

== Geography ==
The Colagne flows southward through the eastern part of the commune, forms part of its south-eastern border, then flows into the Lot, which forms part of the commune's southern border.

== See also ==
- Communes of the Lozère department
