= Lachamp =

Commune in Lozère, France

- Part of Lachamp-Ribennes
- Coat of arms
- Location of Lachamp
- Location within France Location within Occitanie
- Coordinates: 44°36′44″N 3°22′16″E
- Country: France
- Region: Occitania
- Department: Lozère
- Arrondissement: Mende
- Canton: Marvejols
- Commune: Lachamp-Ribennes
- Area^{1}: 25.89 km^{2} (10.00 sq mi)
- Elevation: 1,050 m (3,440 ft)
- Highest elevation: 1,187 m (3,894 ft)
- Lowest elevation: 840 m (2,760 ft)
- Population (2022): 189
  - Density: 7.30/km^{2} (18.9/sq mi)
- Time zone: UTC+01:00 (CET)
  - Summer (DST): UTC+02:00 (CEST)
- Postal code: 48100
- ^{1} French Land Register data, which excludes lakes, ponds, glaciers > 1 km^{2} (0.386 sq mi or 247 acres) and river estuaries.

Lachamp (French pronunciation: [laʃɑ̃]; Occitan: La Chalm) is a former commune in the Lozère department in southern France. On 1 January 2019, it was merged into the new commune Lachamp-Ribennes.

== Geography ==
The Colagne forms part of the commune's western border.

== See also ==
- Communes of the Lozère department
