= Crueize Viaduct =

Viaduct located in the French region, Occitanie

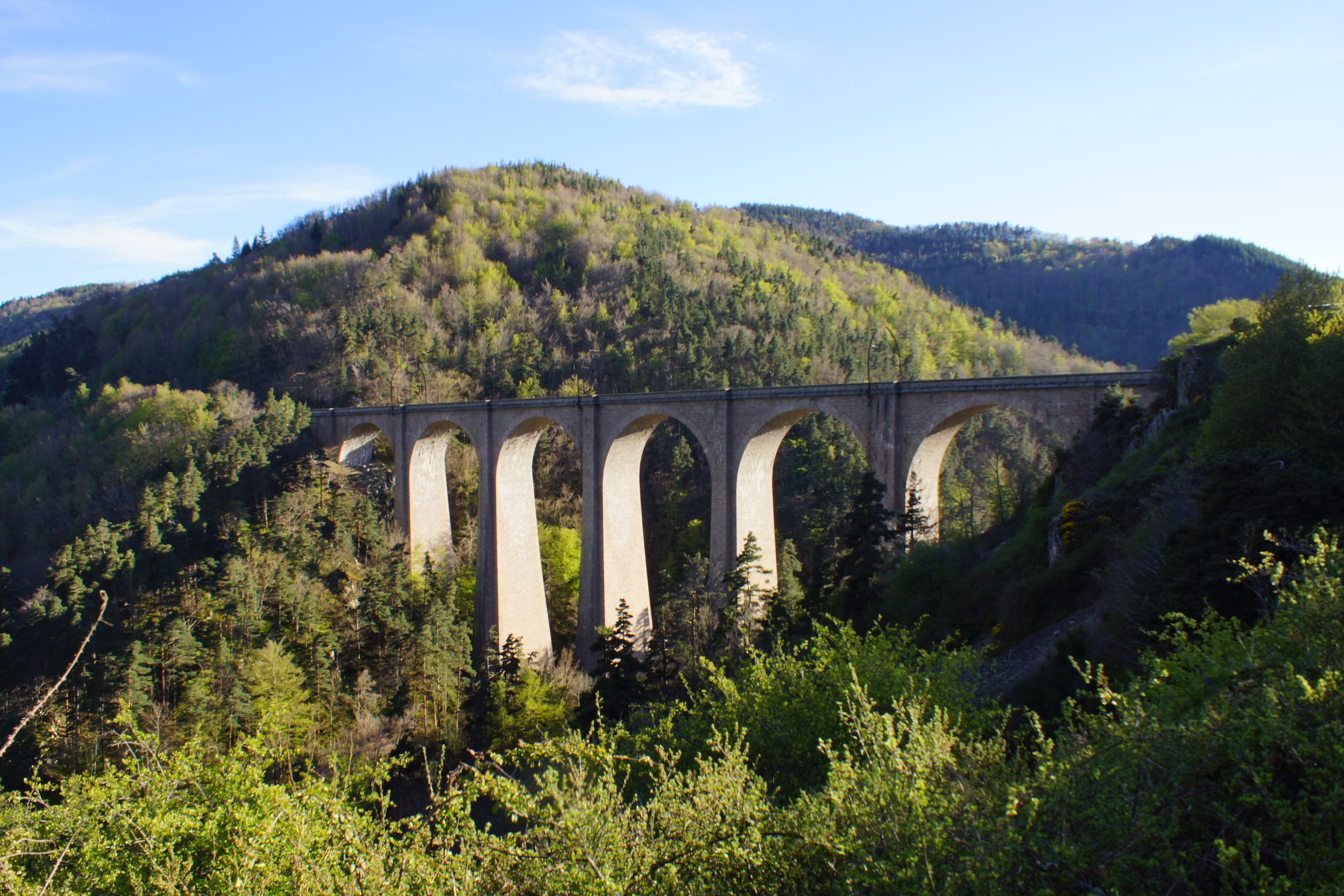
- The viaduct in 2017.
- Coordinates: 44°37′11″N 03°17′04″E
- Crosses: Crueize
- Locale: France, Occitanie region, Lozère department, Saint-Léger-de-Peyre communes.
- Official name: Crueize Viaduct
- Owner: Chemins de fer du Midi

Characteristics
- Design: Arch bridge
- Material: Masonry, Rubble masonry and Dimension stone
- Total length: 218,80 m
- Width: 10 m
- Height: 63,30 m
- Longest span: 25 m

History
- Engineering design by: Léon Boyer Charles Bauby
- Built: 1880-1884
- Opened: May 9th, 1887

Location
- Interactive map of Crueize Viaduct

The Crueize viaduct is a railway viaduct on the Béziers to Neussargues line, located in the commune of Saint-Léger-de-Peyre, in the Lozère département of France. It is nicknamed the "Viaduc de l'Enfer" after the valley it crosses.

Built by the French government under the direction of Léon Boyer, it was commissioned in 1887 by the Compagnie des chemins de fer du Midi et du Canal latéral à la Garonne (C^{ie} du Midi), the concession holder for the line and viaduct. It should not be confused with the Crueize road bridge.

== Location ==
At an altitude of 905 metres, the Crueize viaduct is located at kilometric point (KP) 629.723 on the Béziers to Neussargues line, between the Marvejols and Saint-Sauveur-de-Peyre stations (the latter currently closed). It is flanked by the Lestoura tunnel at KP 628.977 and the Born tunnel at KP 634.564.

== History ==
Marvejols to Neussargues section, where the Crueize viaduct is located, is a textbook case for successful route selection in a difficult environment, due to steep-sided valleys. The initial studies, carried out by engineers from the French government, concluded that the route should be a conventional one through the valleys, and this project was validated shortly before the arrival of the young engineer Léon Boyer, who was put in charge of this section.

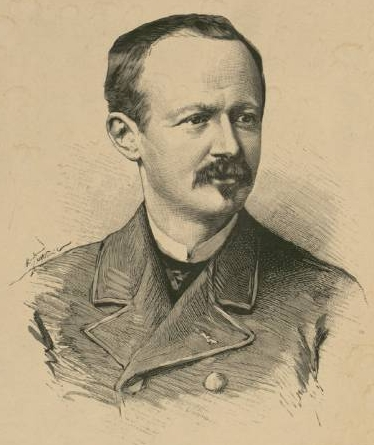
Léon Boyer, viaduct designer.

He resumed the studies, proposing a route over the top of the plateau, which offered the advantage of avoiding a multitude of secondary structures and limiting the number to a few major or even exceptional ones. The difference in cost is significant, since the initial estimate was 9,500,000 francs, whereas it was reduced to 6,500,000 francs in Léon Boyer's project. The revised project also makes for an easier line profile (less gradient), with the track remaining on a relatively flat plateau.

Léon Boyer undertook the study of the line and the design of its many engineering structures. The most remarkable of these are the Garabit and Crueize viaducts, as well as the Chanteperdrix, Sénouard and Piou viaducts. On the Crueize project, he directed the work with the support of his chief engineer Charles Bauby.

In May 1879, the Ministry of Public Works published an announcement in the Journal officiel de la République française (Official Journal of the French Republic) calling for the adjudication of works to be carried out on the railway from Marvejols to Neussargues. This involved the 4th construction lot, between KP 8.400 and 11.290, over a length of 2,890.50 m, with the main structure being the "Crueize viaduct", with 216 m long and 63.20 m high. The total cost of the project, excluding contingencies, was estimated at 2,717,203.08 francs at the time.

Following the tender, the viaduct construction site was opened in early 1880. During 1882, work progressed rapidly. In August 1884, the engineering structures were completed and the company began laying the track for the section.

The viaduct was put into service on May 9, 1887, when the Compagnie des chemins de fer du Midi et du Canal latéral à la Garonne opened the Marvejols to Saint-Chély section.

== Characteristics ==
=== General description ===
The viaduct is set in the Crueize valley, in a steep, wild spot known as the "gorge de l'Enfer". It has a slightly pinkish hue, with slender piers that stand out against the dark background of a pine forest.

Designed for two railroad lines, it comprises six 25-meter arches and has a total length of 218.80 m, with a maximum height of 63.30 m, measured from rail level to the lowest point in the valley. Its width between parapets is generally 8 m, but reaches 10 m at the pier buttresses. The structure is straight, with a gradient of 27.5 millimetres per meter as it descends towards Marvejols.

The viaduct in August 1883

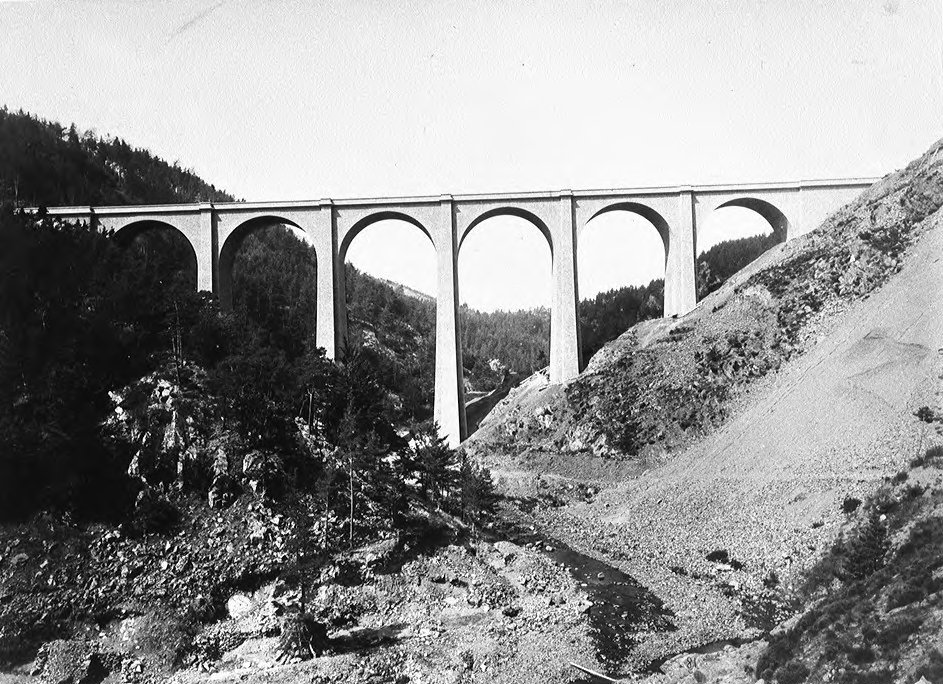

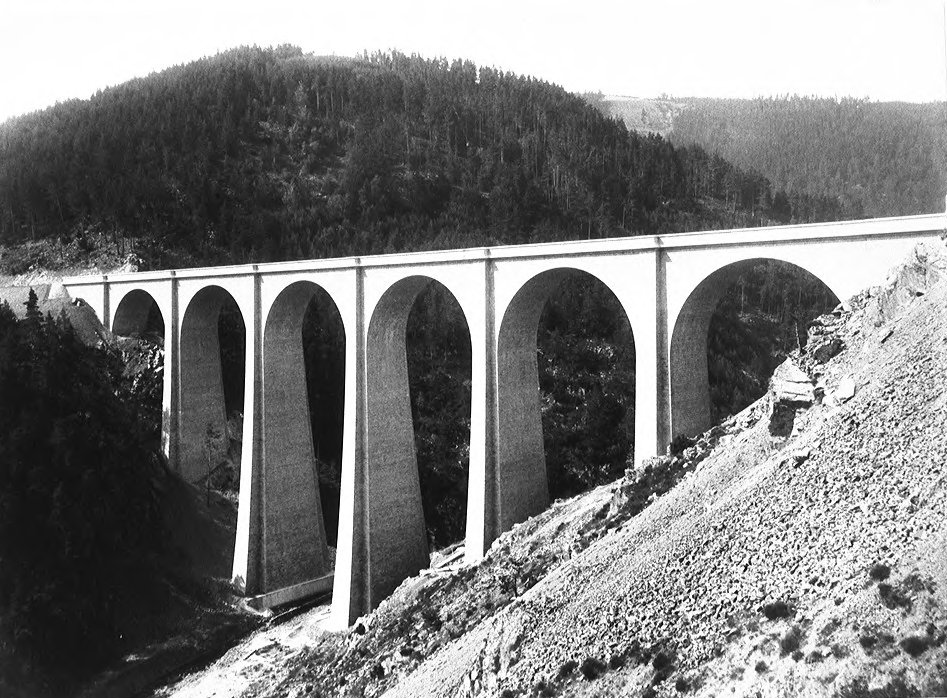

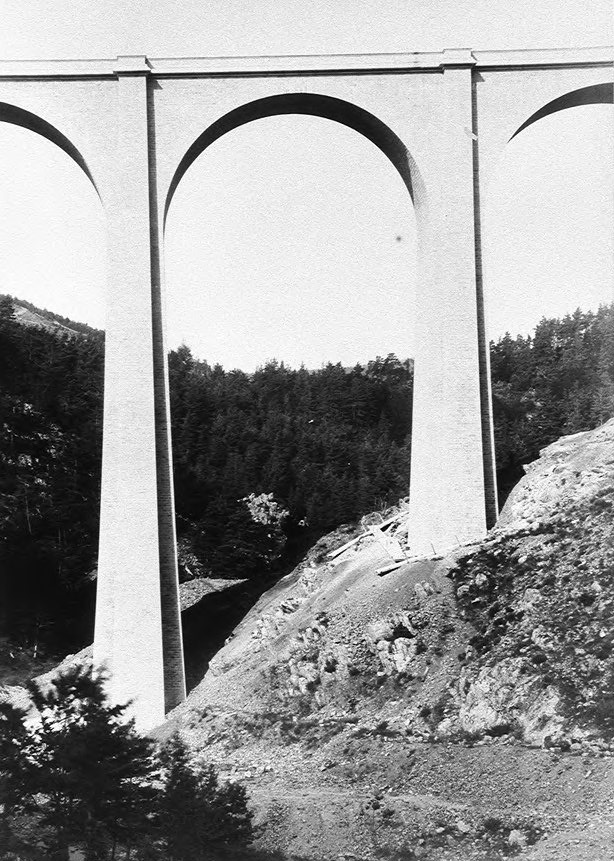

Project plans

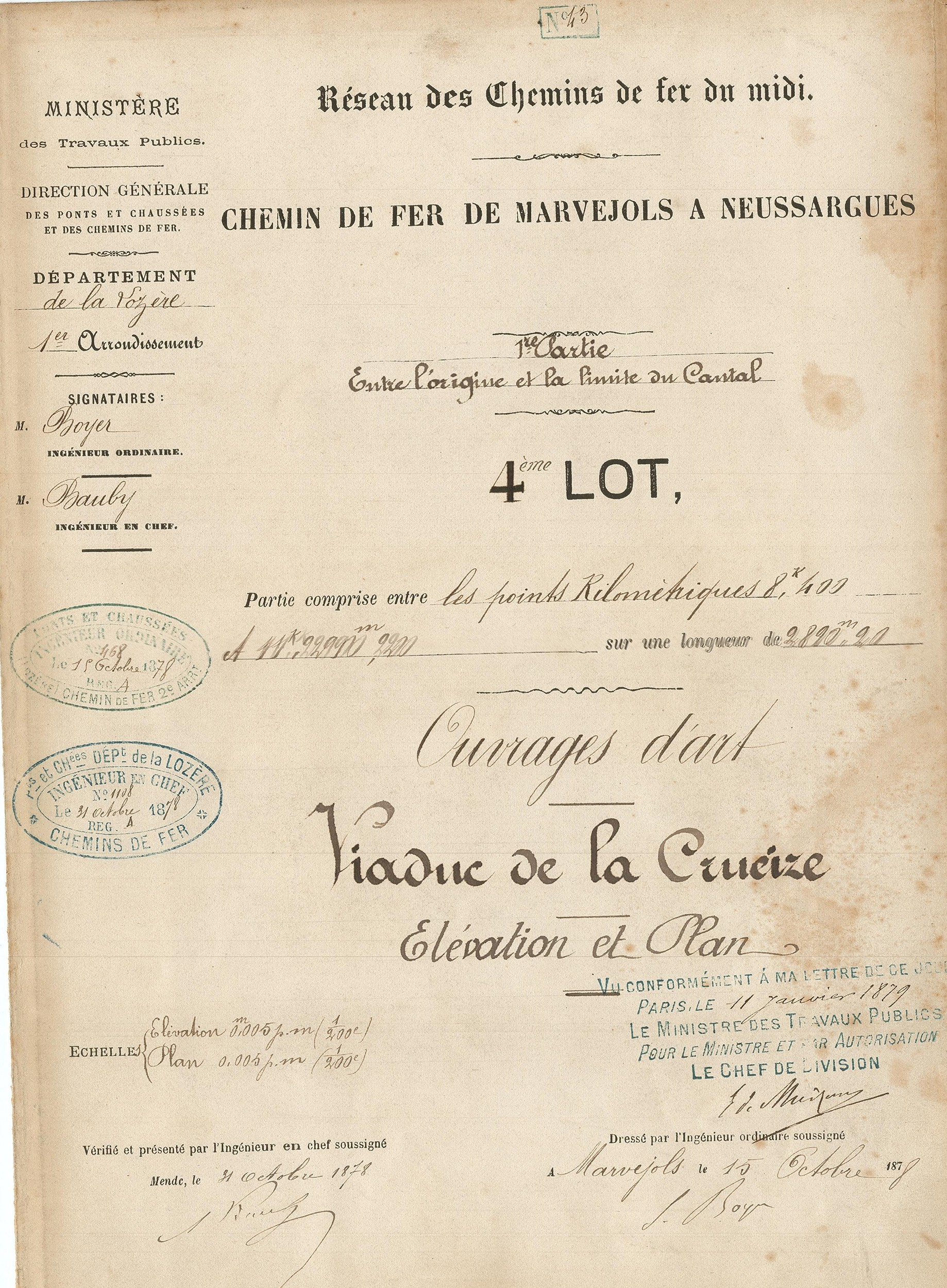

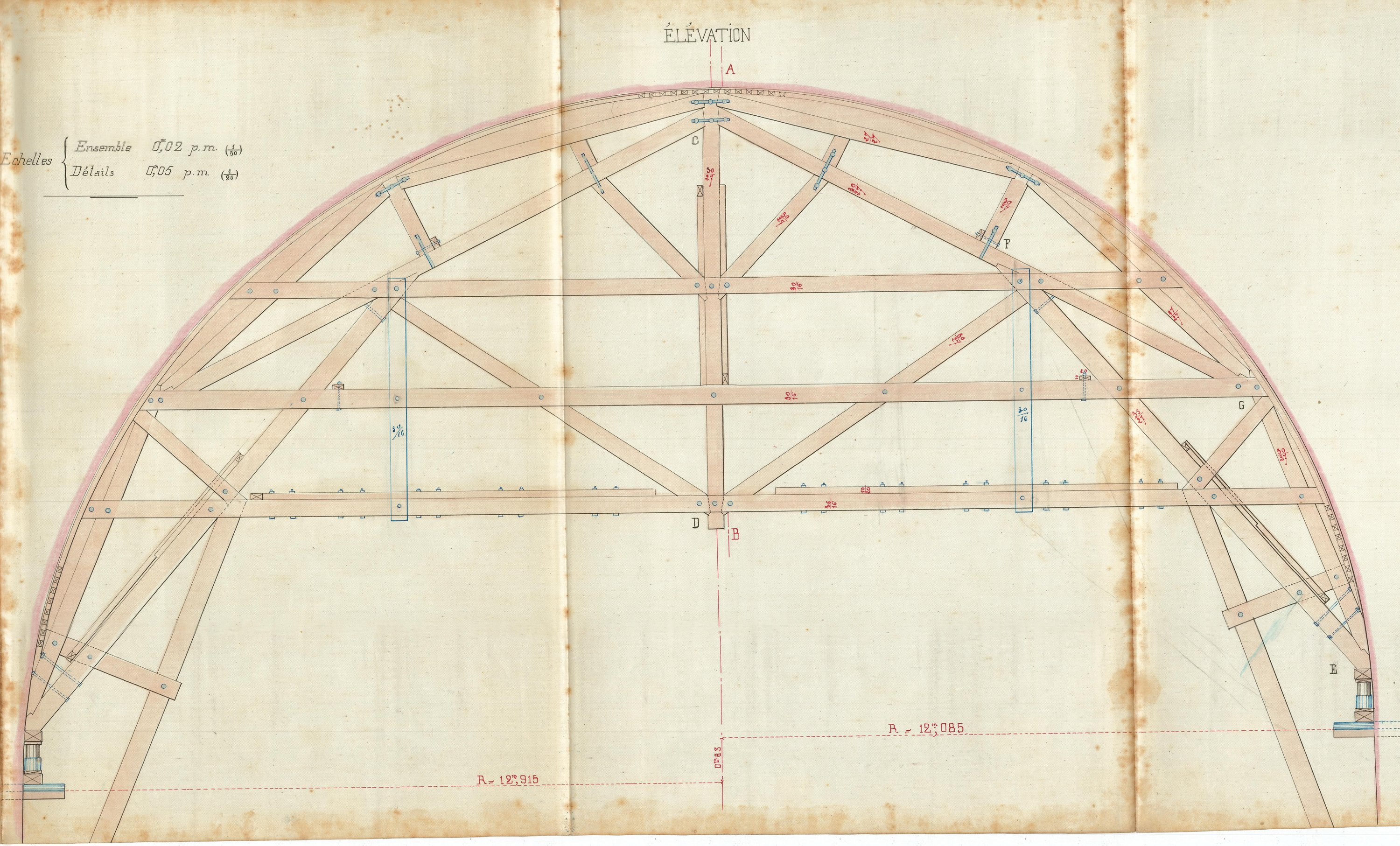

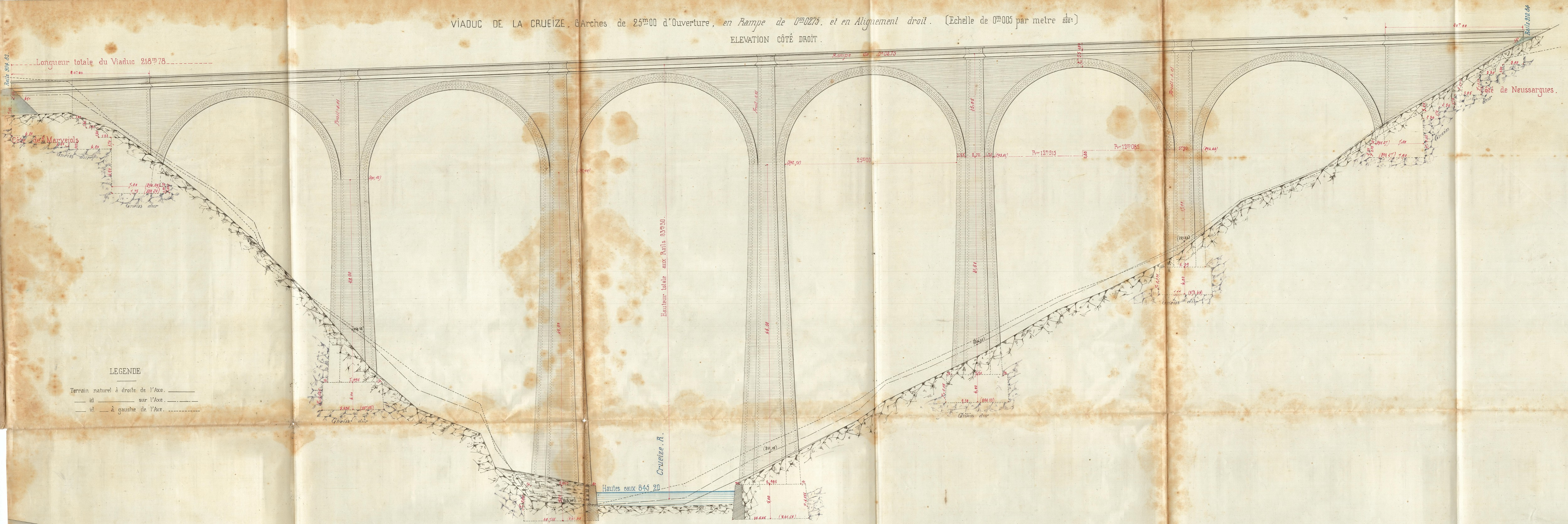

=== Construction techniques ===
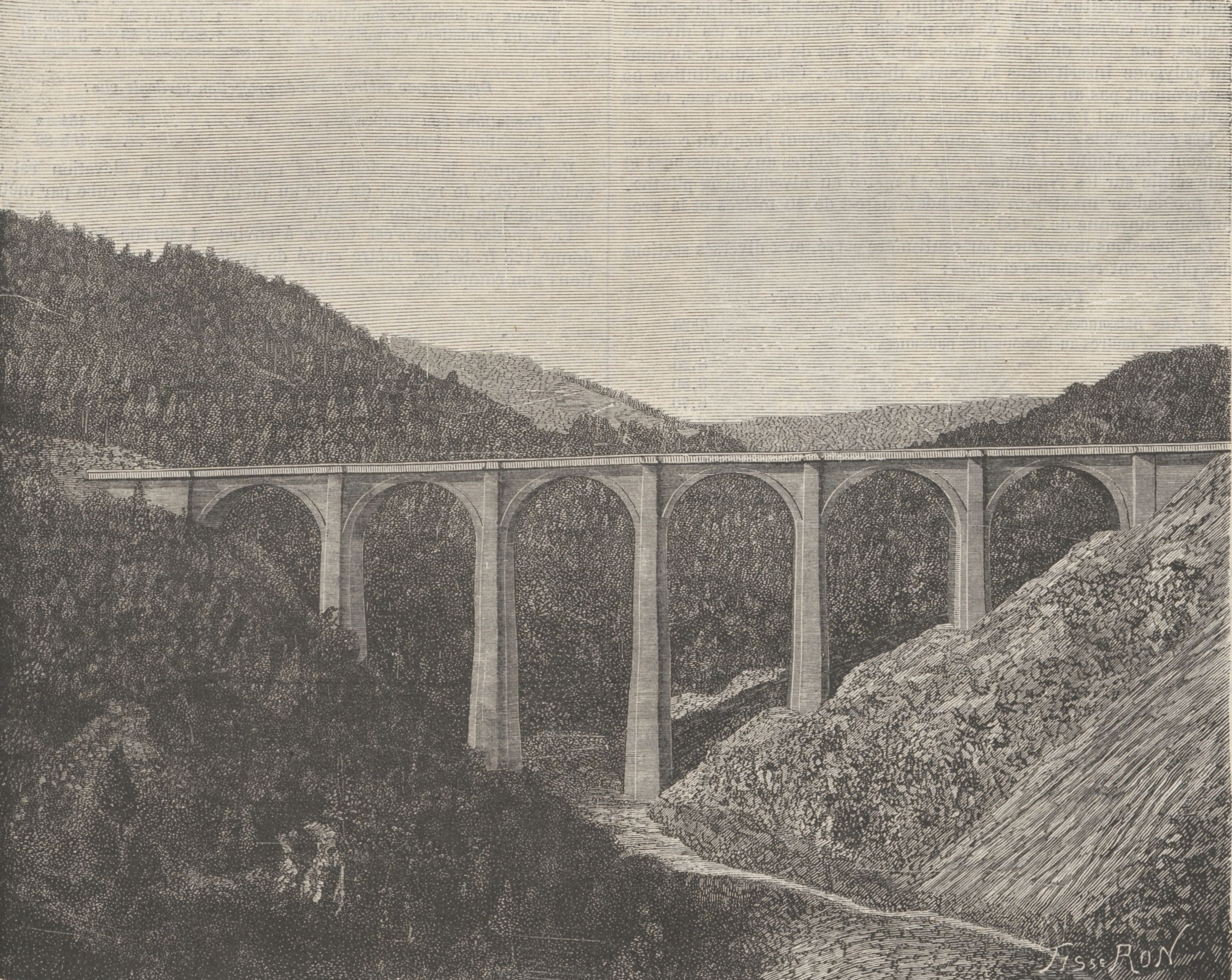
Engraving published in 1891 in Le Génie civil.

"The arch vaults have an intrados composed of two quarter-circles with a radius of 12.915 m and 12.085 m, respectively. This is intended to compensate for the gradient (Note: In architecture, a repurchase is an operation aimed at "correcting or rendering less sensitive a defect, a construction or decoration fault, an irregularity, etc.".) while keeping the bases of two adjacent arches at the same level. This method has the advantage of bringing the resultant pressure back towards the center of the pile. These arch vaults have a thickness of 1.30 m at the keystone. The structure is refined by three longitudinal vaults, each 1.20 m wide".

"The pillars show, on all sides, a progressive fruit (decrease in thickness) from the bottom to the top. This system, first used by Messrs Robaglia, Inspector General of Ponts et Chaussées, and Pader, Chief Engineer, on the Vezouillac Viaduct (currently on the section between Millau and Séverac-le-Château), has the effect of levelling the pressures on the different piers. It eliminates the protrusions (the part that forms an overhang on the vertical plane) that would have been necessary to create at different heights. By eliminating the protrusions, the edges are left in all their purity, and their continuity helps to mark the height of the structure". Nevertheless, "to facilitate the laying of the rubble stones for the edges and facing, the theoretical curve is replaced by a series of straight lines 5 m long, forming a polygon inscribed within the theoretical curve". Because of its distance, an observer at first glance sees only a regular curve.

"The buttresses are set against the piers and rise up to the top of the viaduct. They are two meters wide at the base, and extend one meter beyond the spandrels at the plinth. The maximum depth of the foundations is ten meters, and on average 6.50 m".

=== Materials used ===
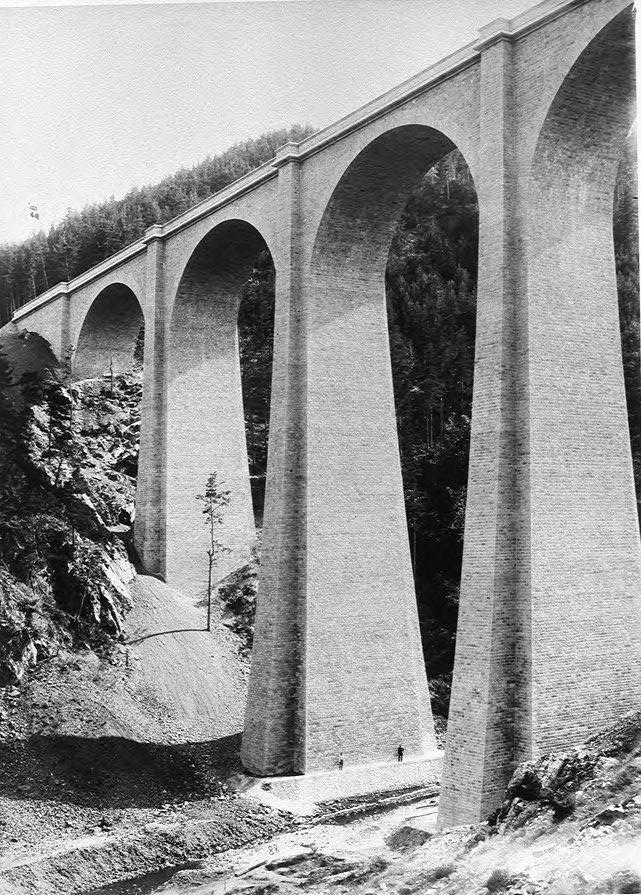
The viaduct in 1883.

Only the capping is in ashlar. "The bands of the arches, as well as the corners of the piers, abutments, and buttresses, are in smoothed rubble, (Note: In the construction of railway engineering structures, "Smoothed rubble for facing is squared and dressed with a hammer and large point on the faces, beds and joints; (...)".) while the other visible facings are in stubbed rubble. (Note: In the construction of railway engineering structures, "Smoothed rubble for facing is squared and dressed with a hammer and large point on the faces, beds and joints; (...)".) Double chiseling is used along the edges to define the lines and ensure accuracy". The blockwork is made out of gneiss rubble, the cladding is in sandstone and the ashlar capping stone is in granite.

The lime used comes from factories in Le Teil and Cruas. The sand comes from a variety of sources: "some is extracted from the bed of the Colagne, some comes from an open quarry in deposits of ancient formation, yielding sand of superior quality, and a smaller quantity is obtained by crushing and washing soft granite supplied by a trench. Mortar for vaulted masonry is made up to 1.50 m above the joints and up to 1.50 m on either side of the keystone, by adding 200 kg of slow-setting cement per cubic meter of mortar. The three layers of cladding are finished with slow-setting cement mortar".

=== Centring ===
"The centring (a temporary wooden structure used for vault construction) was supported by a double row of rails running through the masonry of the piers. The first supports for the legs of the rafters were established at the level of the crossheads. Each support consisted of two rails weighing 36 kg per running meter. The second row of supports, placed four meters below, consisted of a single rail on which, via a sole plate, struts supported the main crossbeams towards the middle. These centrings were hoisted onto the upper floor of the service bridge established for the construction of the piers". Each one required 156.117 m^{3} of wood and 4,958 kg of iron (bolts and various reinforcements).

When the centring was dismantled, the compaction of the arches was measured at 0.009 m.

=== Costs ===
The total cost of building the viaduct was 1,290,000 francs at the time, comprising 589,885.82 Fr for the piers and abutments, 527,030.21 Fr for the plinths and parapets, 19,841.17 Fr for the foundations and 63,136.23 Fr for the centrings.

== See also ==
- Gien viaduct
- Saint-Léger-de-Peyre
- List of bridges in France
