= Ribennes =

Commune in Lozère, France

- Part of Lachamp-Ribennes
- Location of Ribennes
- Location within France Location within Occitanie
- Coordinates: 44°38′23″N 3°23′55″E
- Country: France
- Region: Occitania
- Department: Lozère
- Arrondissement: Mende
- Canton: Marvejols
- Commune: Lachamp-Ribennes
- Area^{1}: 24.97 km^{2} (9.64 sq mi)
- Elevation: 1,000 m (3,300 ft)
- Highest elevation: 1,203 m (3,947 ft)
- Lowest elevation: 917 m (3,009 ft)
- Population (2022): 186
  - Density: 7.45/km^{2} (19.3/sq mi)
- Time zone: UTC+01:00 (CET)
  - Summer (DST): UTC+02:00 (CEST)
- Postal code: 48700
- ^{1} French Land Register data, which excludes lakes, ponds, glaciers > 1 km^{2} (0.386 sq mi or 247 acres) and river estuaries.

Ribennes (French pronunciation: [ʁibɛn]; Occitan: Ribenas) is a former commune in the Lozère department in southern France. On 1 January 2019, it was merged into the new commune Lachamp-Ribennes.

== Geography ==
The Colagne flows westward through the middle of the commune.

== See also ==
- Communes of the Lozère department
