= Les Salelles =

Les Salelles is the name of two communes in France:

- Les Salelles, in the Ardèche department
- Les Salelles, in the Lozère department
