= Saint-Léger-de-Peyre =

- Commune
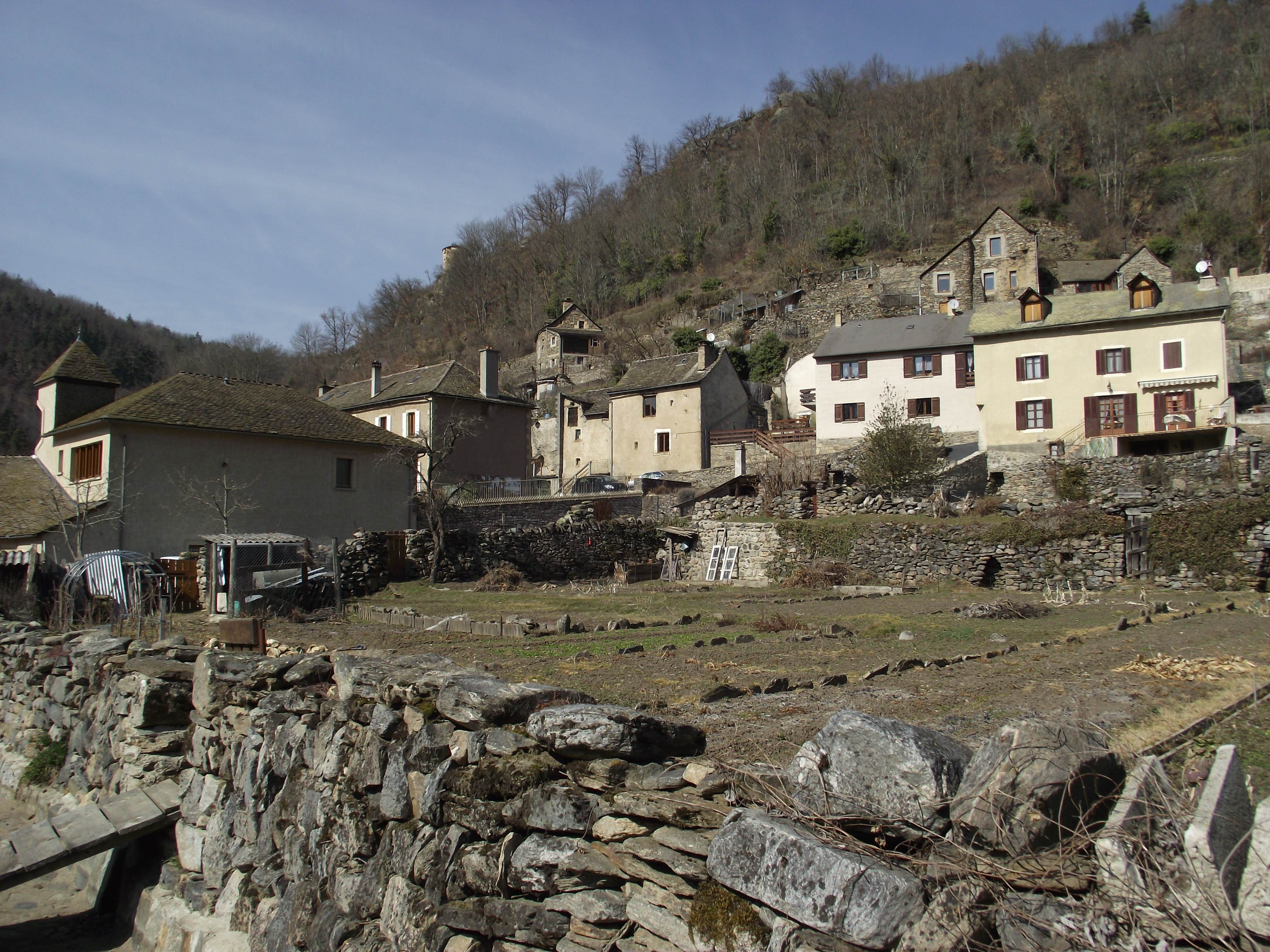
- The village of St-Léger-de-Peyre in the Colagne valley, north of Marvejols
- Location of Saint-Léger-de-Peyre
- Location within France Location within Occitanie
- Coordinates: 44°35′43″N 3°18′07″E
- Country: France
- Region: Occitania
- Department: Lozère
- Arrondissement: Mende
- Canton: Marvejols
- Intercommunality: Gévaudan

Government
  - Mayor (2020–2026): Jean-Paul Itier
- Area^{1}: 27.35 km^{2} (10.56 sq mi)
- Elevation: 720 m (2,360 ft)
- Highest elevation: 1,154 m (3,786 ft)
- Lowest elevation: 670 m (2,200 ft)
- Population (2023): 184
  - Density: 6.73/km^{2} (17.4/sq mi)
- Time zone: UTC+01:00 (CET)
  - Summer (DST): UTC+02:00 (CEST)
- INSEE/Postal code: 48168 /48100
- ^{1} French Land Register data, which excludes lakes, ponds, glaciers > 1 km^{2} (0.386 sq mi or 247 acres) and river estuaries.

Saint-Léger-de-Peyre (French pronunciation: [sɛ̃ leʒe də pɛʁ]; Occitan: Sent Latgièr de Peire) is a commune in the Lozère department in southern France.

== Geography ==
The river Colagne flows southwestward through the southern part of the commune and crosses the village.

== See also ==
- Communes of the Lozère department
- Crueize Viaduct
