= Recoules-de-Fumas =

- Commune
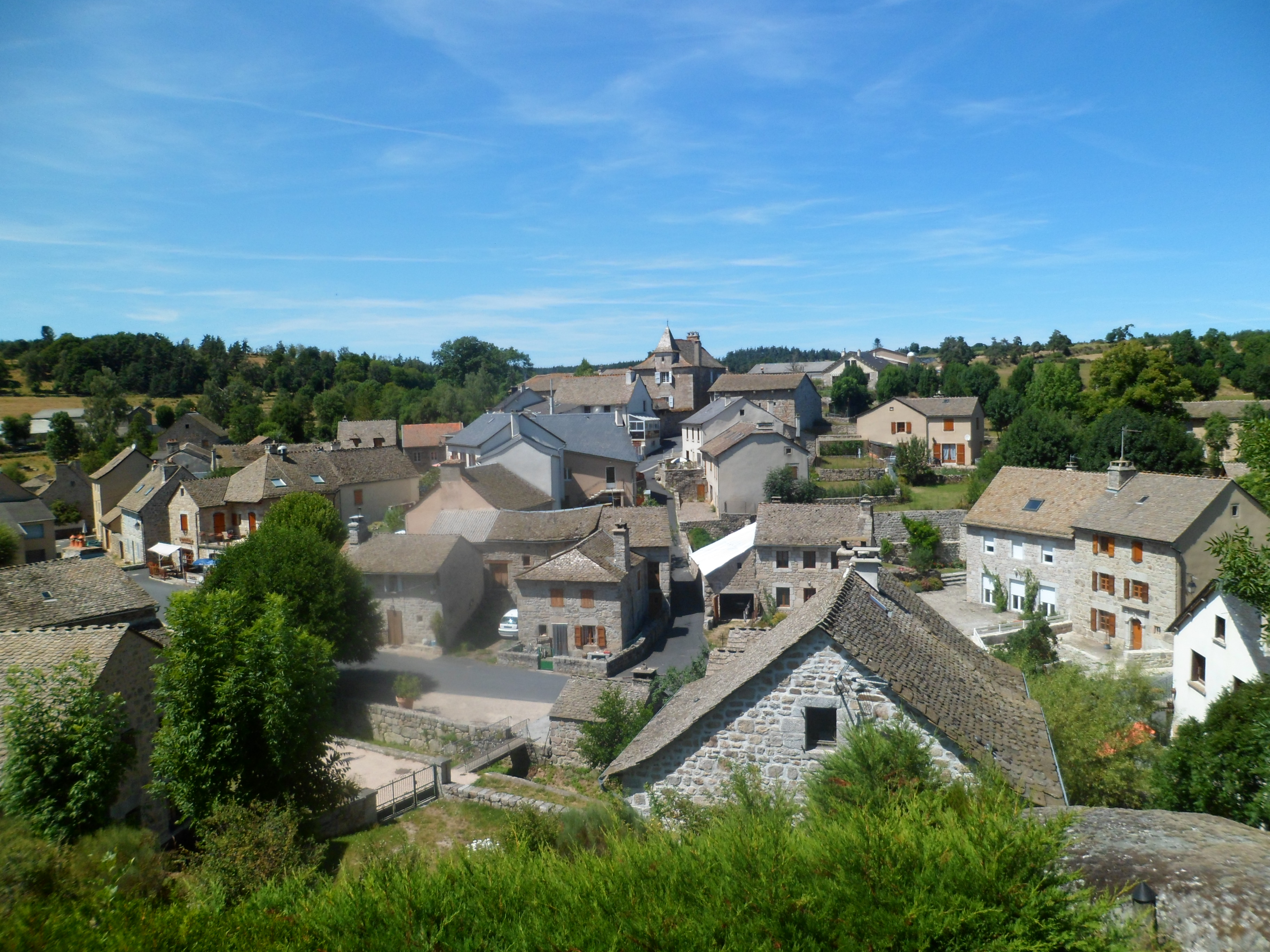
- The village of Recoules-de-Fumas
- Location of Recoules-de-Fumas
- Location within France Location within Occitanie
- Coordinates: 44°38′31″N 3°20′48″E
- Country: France
- Region: Occitania
- Department: Lozère
- Arrondissement: Mende
- Canton: Marvejols
- Intercommunality: Gévaudan

Government
  - Mayor (2020–2026): Christophe Sudre
- Area^{1}: 9.77 km^{2} (3.77 sq mi)
- Elevation: 1,050 m (3,440 ft)
- Highest elevation: 1,144 m (3,753 ft)
- Lowest elevation: 879 m (2,884 ft)
- Population (2023): 98
  - Density: 10/km^{2} (26/sq mi)
- Time zone: UTC+01:00 (CET)
  - Summer (DST): UTC+02:00 (CEST)
- INSEE/Postal code: 48124 /48100
- ^{1} French Land Register data, which excludes lakes, ponds, glaciers > 1 km^{2} (0.386 sq mi or 247 acres) and river estuaries.

Recoules-de-Fumas (French pronunciation: [ʁəkul də fymas]; Occitan: Recola de Fumàs [re'ku.ɡo̞ de fy'mas]) is a commune in the Lozère department in southern France.

== Geography ==
The river Colagne forms most of the commune's eastern border.

== See also ==
- Communes of the Lozère department
