= Canton of Marvejols =

Coordinates: 44.55°N 3.29°E

- Canton
- Interactive map of Canton of Marvejols
- Country: France
- Region: Occitania
- Department: Lozère
- No. of communes: {{{nbcomm}}}

Government
  - Representatives (2021–2028): Patricia Bremond; Gilbert Fontugne
- Area: 137.36 km^{2} (53.03 sq mi)
- Population (2023): 5,756
  - Density: 41.90/km^{2} (108.5/sq mi)
- INSEE code: 48 08

The canton of Marvejols is an administrative division of the Lozère department, southern France. Its borders were modified at the French canton reorganisation which came into effect in March 2015. Its seat is in Marvejols.

== Composition ==
It consists of the following communes:

1. Antrenas
2. Lachamp-Ribennes
3. Marvejols
4. Recoules-de-Fumas
5. Saint-Léger-de-Peyre

== Councillors ==
Period elected		Mandate		Name	Party	Occupation
2015	2021	2015	2021	Patricia Brémond	DVG	Mayor of Grèzes
2015	2021	2015	2021	Bernard Durand	DVG	
2021	2028	2021	Incumbent	Patricia Brémond	DVG	Mayor of Grèzes
2021	2028	2021	Incumbent	Gilbert Fontugne	DVG	Mayor of Antrenas

== Pictures of the canton ==
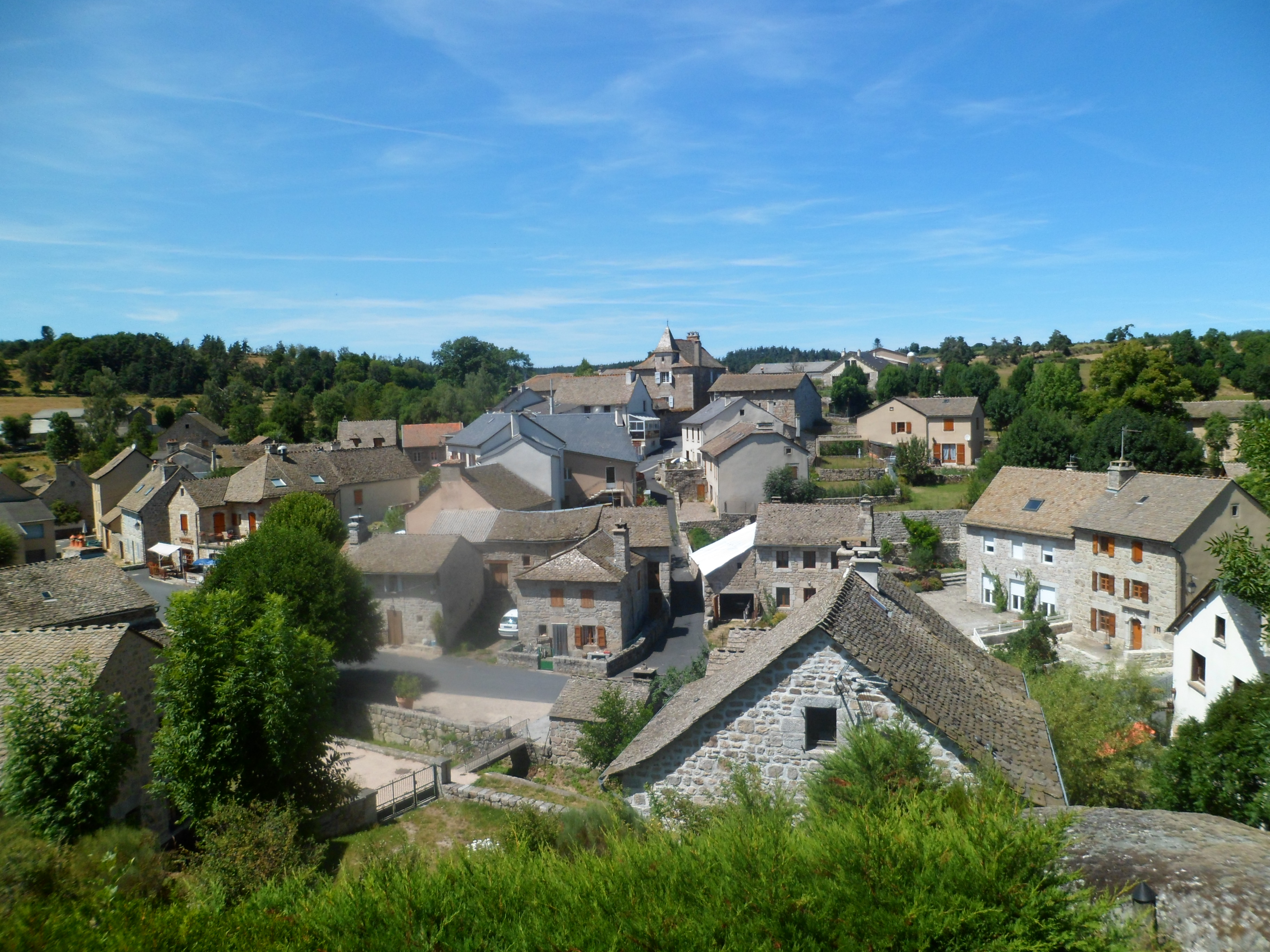
View of Recoules-de-Fumas

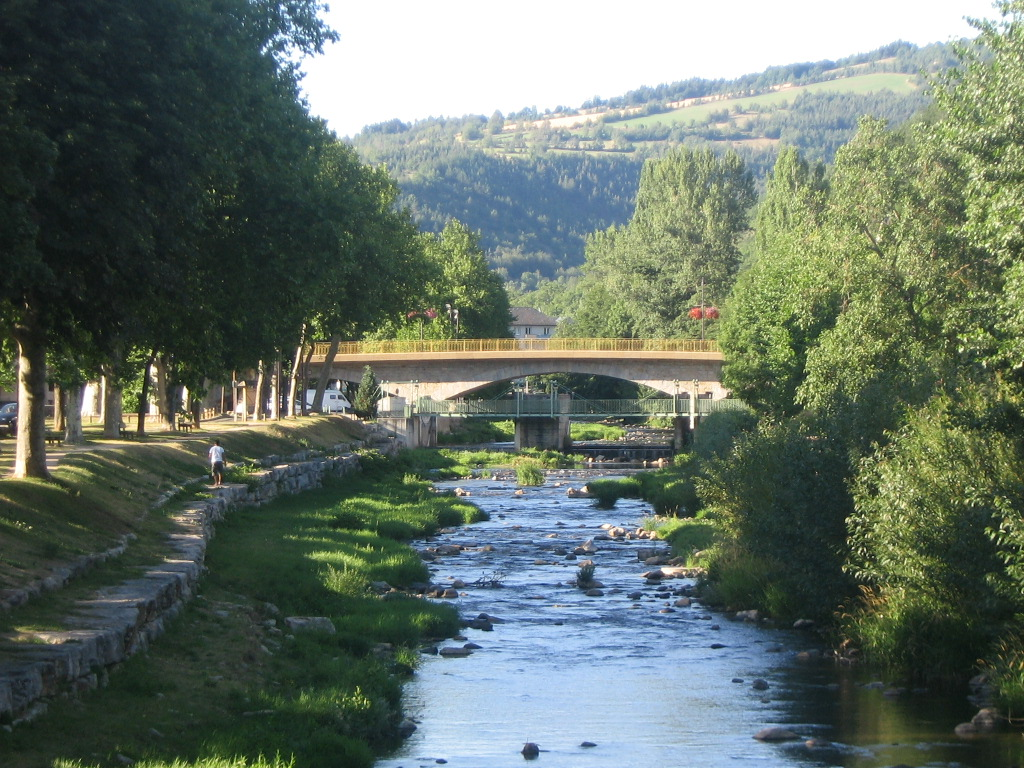
The river Colagne in Marvejols
