= Bourgs sur Colagne =

- Commune
- Coat of arms
- Location of Bourgs sur Colagne
- Location within France Location within Occitanie
- Coordinates: 44°30′54″N 3°15′14″E
- Country: France
- Region: Occitania
- Department: Lozère
- Arrondissement: Mende
- Canton: Bourgs sur Colagne

Government
  - Mayor (2020–2026): Lionel Bouniol
- Area^{1}: 53.09 km^{2} (20.50 sq mi)
- Population (2023): 2,091
  - Density: 39.39/km^{2} (102.0/sq mi)
- Time zone: UTC+01:00 (CET)
  - Summer (DST): UTC+02:00 (CEST)
- INSEE/Postal code: 48099 /48100
- ^{1} French Land Register data, which excludes lakes, ponds, glaciers > 1 km^{2} (0.386 sq mi or 247 acres) and river estuaries.

Bourgs sur Colagne (French pronunciation: [buʁ syʁ kɔlaɲ]) is a commune in the department of Lozère, southern France. The municipality was established on 1 January 2016 by merger of the former communes of Le Monastier-Pin-Moriès and Chirac.

== Population ==
Population data refer to the commune in its geography as of January 2025.

Historical population
Year	Pop.	±% p.a.
1968	1,481	—
1975	1,355	−1.26%
1982	1,610	+2.49%
1990	1,778	+1.25%
1999	1,729	−0.31%
2007	1,964	+1.61%
2012	2,107	+1.42%
2017	2,137	+0.28%
2023	2,091	−0.36%
Source: INSEE

== See also ==
- Communes of the Lozère department
