= Balsièges =

- Commune
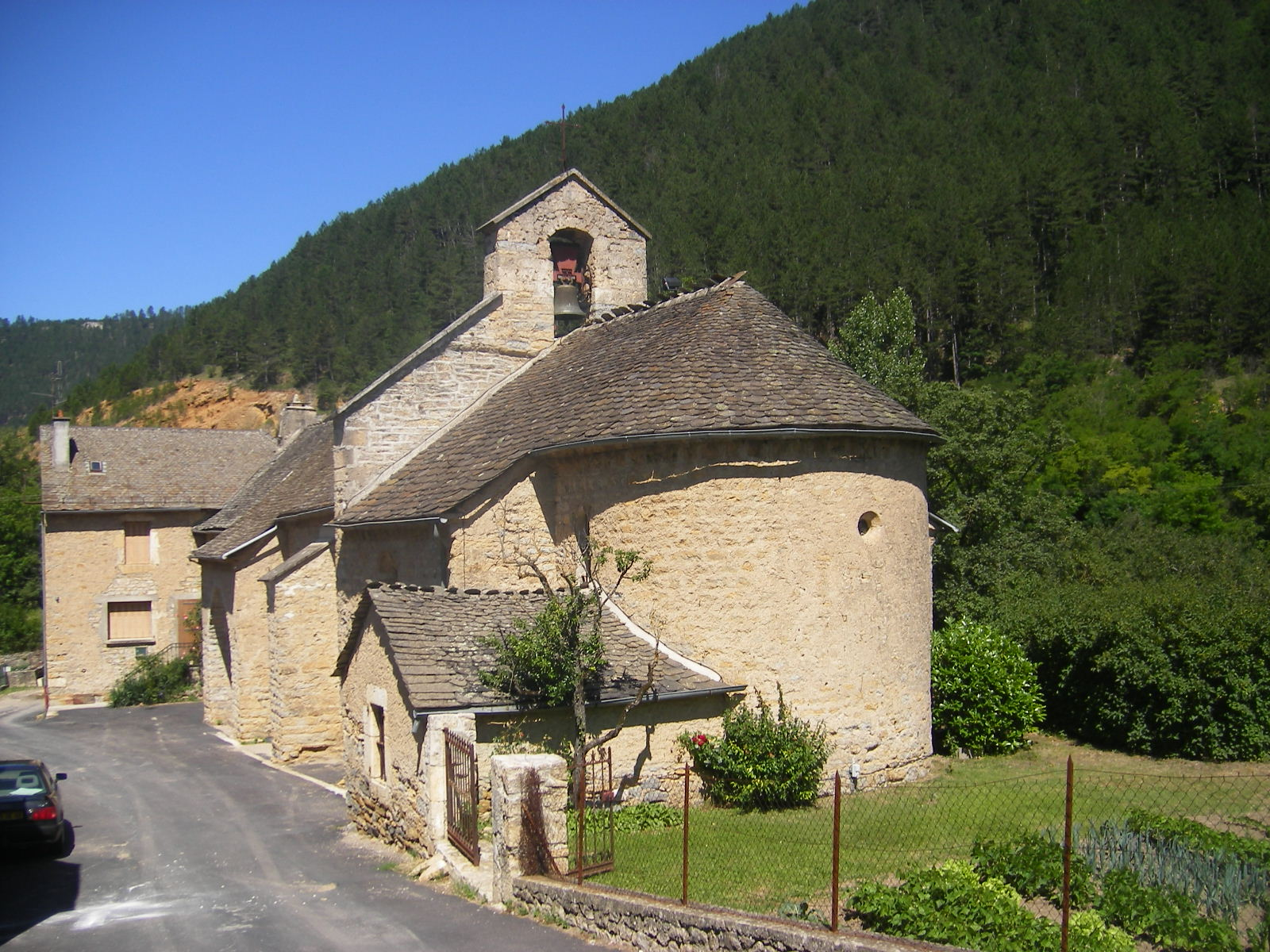
- The church in Balsièges

- Coat of arms
- Location of Balsièges
- Location within France Location within Occitanie
- Coordinates: 44°28′53″N 3°27′30″E
- Country: France
- Region: Occitania
- Department: Lozère
- Arrondissement: Mende
- Canton: Bourgs sur Colagne
- Intercommunality: CC Cœur de Lozère

Government
  - Mayor (2020–2026): Philippe Martin
- Area^{1}: 32.88 km^{2} (12.70 sq mi)
- Elevation: 685 m (2,247 ft)
- Highest elevation: 1,093 m (3,586 ft)
- Lowest elevation: 652 m (2,139 ft)
- Population (2023): 608
  - Density: 18.5/km^{2} (47.9/sq mi)
- Time zone: UTC+01:00 (CET)
  - Summer (DST): UTC+02:00 (CEST)
- INSEE/Postal code: 48016 /48000
- ^{1} French Land Register data, which excludes lakes, ponds, glaciers > 1 km^{2} (0.386 sq mi or 247 acres) and river estuaries.

Balsièges is a commune in the Lozère department in southern France.

== Population ==
Historical population
Year	Pop.	±% p.a.
1968	365	—
1975	352	−0.52%
1982	313	−1.66%
1990	428	+3.99%
1999	508	+1.92%
2007	514	+0.15%
2012	529	+0.58%
2017	549	+0.74%
2023	608	+1.72%
Source: INSEE

== See also ==
- Communes of the Lozère department
