= Lachamp-Ribennes =

- Commune
- Location of Lachamp-Ribennes
- Location within France Location within Occitanie
- Coordinates: 44°38′23″N 3°23′55″E
- Country: France
- Region: Occitania
- Department: Lozère
- Arrondissement: Mende
- Canton: Marvejols
- Intercommunality: Randon-Margeride
- Area^{1}: 50.86 km^{2} (19.64 sq mi)
- Highest elevation: 1,203 m (3,947 ft)
- Lowest elevation: 840 m (2,760 ft)
- Population (2023): 379
  - Density: 7.45/km^{2} (19.3/sq mi)
- Time zone: UTC+01:00 (CET)
  - Summer (DST): UTC+02:00 (CEST)
- INSEE/Postal code: 48126 /48700
- ^{1} French Land Register data, which excludes lakes, ponds, glaciers > 1 km^{2} (0.386 sq mi or 247 acres) and river estuaries.

Lachamp-Ribennes is a commune in the Lozère department in southern France. It was established on 1 January 2019 by merger of the former communes of Ribennes (the seat) and Lachamp.

== See also ==
- Communes of the Lozère department
