= Saint-Germain-du-Teil =

- Commune
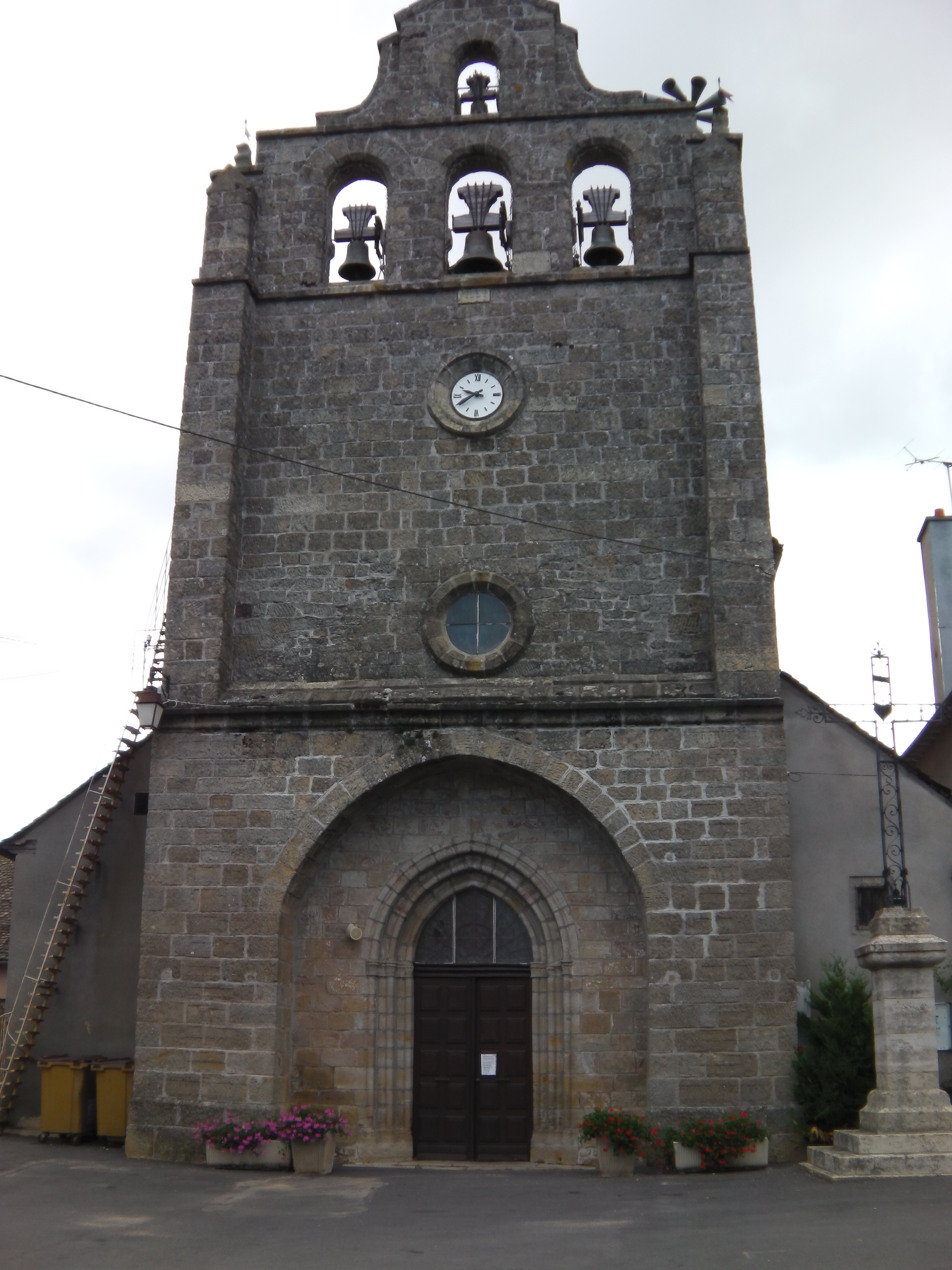
- The church in Saint-Germain-du-Teil

- Coat of arms
- Location of Saint-Germain-du-Teil
- Location within France Location within Occitanie
- Coordinates: 44°28′45″N 3°10′23″E
- Country: France
- Region: Occitania
- Department: Lozère
- Arrondissement: Mende
- Canton: Bourgs sur Colagne
- Intercommunality: Aubrac Lot Causses Tarn

Government
  - Mayor (2020–2026): Didier Jurquet
- Area^{1}: 22.58 km^{2} (8.72 sq mi)
- Elevation: 810 m (2,660 ft)
- Highest elevation: 1,122 m (3,681 ft)
- Lowest elevation: 520 m (1,710 ft)
- Population (2023): 858
  - Density: 38.0/km^{2} (98.4/sq mi)
- Time zone: UTC+01:00 (CET)
  - Summer (DST): UTC+02:00 (CEST)
- INSEE/Postal code: 48156 /48340
- ^{1} French Land Register data, which excludes lakes, ponds, glaciers > 1 km^{2} (0.386 sq mi or 247 acres) and river estuaries.

Saint-Germain-du-Teil (French pronunciation: [sɛ̃ ʒɛʁmɛ̃ dy tɛj]; Occitan: Sant German del Telh) is a commune in the Lozère department in southern France.

== See also ==
- Communes of the Lozère department
