= Palhers =

- Commune
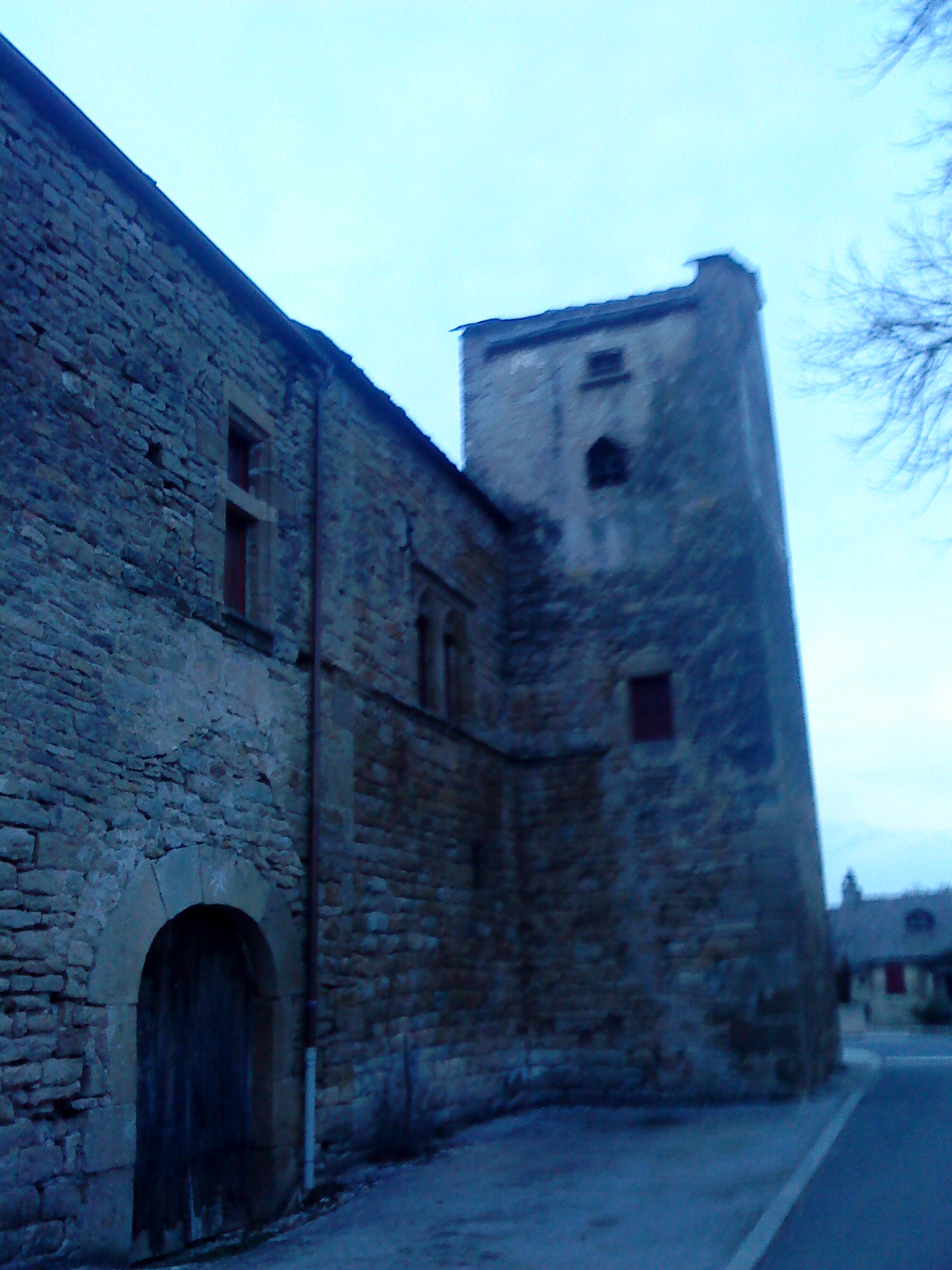
- The Commandery of Palhers
- Location of Palhers
- Location within France Location within Occitanie
- Coordinates: 44°31′16″N 3°17′56″E
- Country: France
- Region: Occitania
- Department: Lozère
- Arrondissement: Mende
- Canton: Bourgs sur Colagne
- Intercommunality: Gévaudan

Government
  - Mayor (2020–2026): André Raymond
- Area^{1}: 8.59 km^{2} (3.32 sq mi)
- Elevation: 685 m (2,247 ft)
- Highest elevation: 1,022 m (3,353 ft)
- Lowest elevation: 668 m (2,192 ft)
- Population (2023): 200
  - Density: 23/km^{2} (60/sq mi)
- Time zone: UTC+01:00 (CET)
  - Summer (DST): UTC+02:00 (CEST)
- INSEE/Postal code: 48107 /48100
- ^{1} French Land Register data, which excludes lakes, ponds, glaciers > 1 km^{2} (0.386 sq mi or 247 acres) and river estuaries.

Palhers is a commune in the Lozère département in southern France.

== See also ==
- Communes of the Lozère department
