= Chirac, Lozère =

Former commune in Occitania, France

Chirac
- Part of Bourgs-sur-Colagne
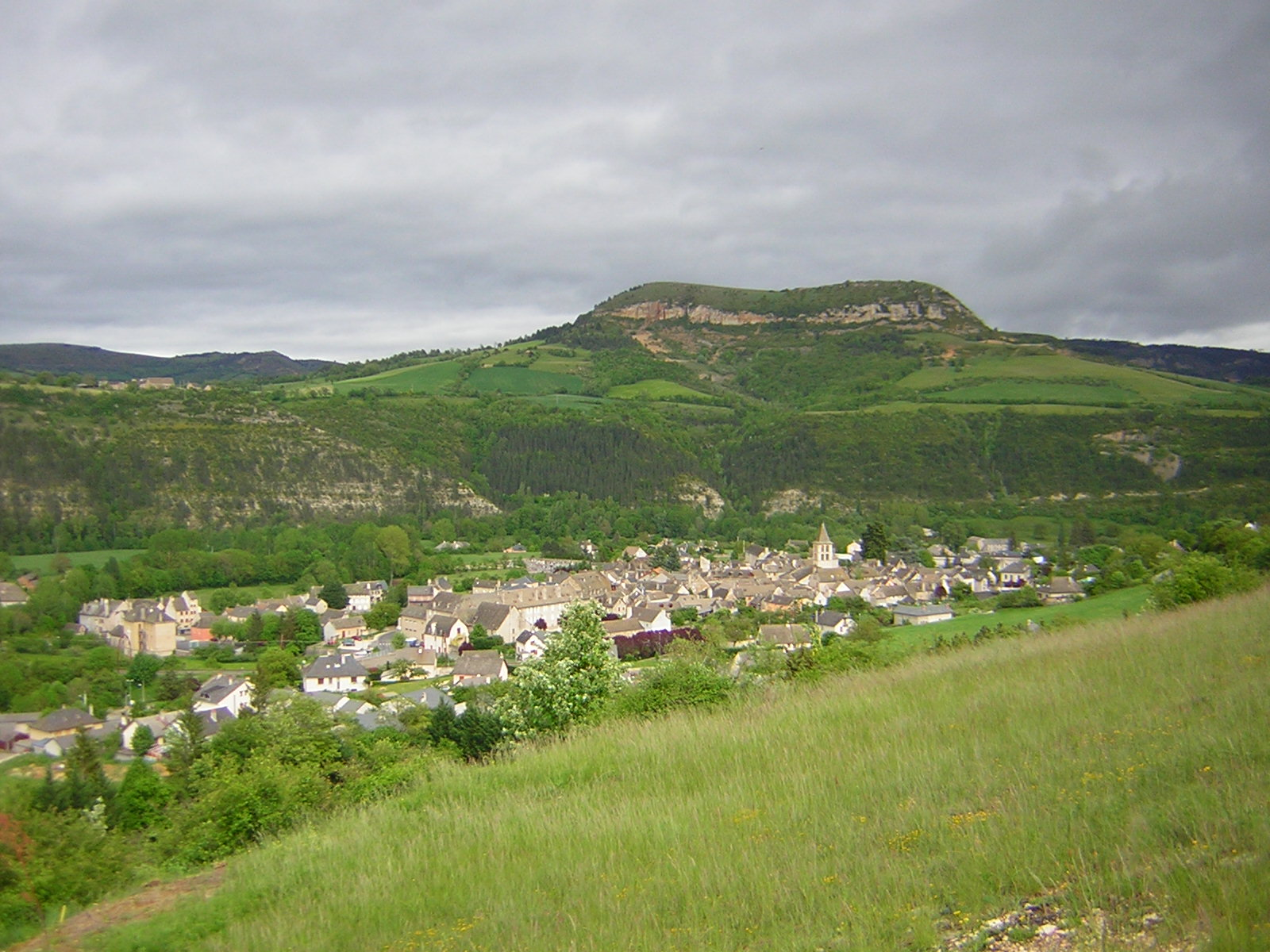
- A view of Chirac and St-Bonnet

- Coat of arms
- Location of Chirac
- Location within France Location within Occitanie
- Coordinates: 44°31′29″N 3°15′58″E
- Country: France
- Region: Occitania
- Department: Lozère
- Arrondissement: Mende
- Canton: Chirac
- Commune: Bourgs-sur-Colagne
- Area^{1}: 33.79 km^{2} (13.05 sq mi)
- Elevation: 640 m (2,100 ft)
- Highest elevation: 1,254 m (4,114 ft)
- Lowest elevation: 605 m (1,985 ft)
- Population (2022): 1,135
  - Density: 33.59/km^{2} (87.00/sq mi)
- Time zone: UTC+01:00 (CET)
  - Summer (DST): UTC+02:00 (CEST)
- Postal code: 48100
- ^{1} French Land Register data, which excludes lakes, ponds, glaciers > 1 km^{2} (0.386 sq mi or 247 acres) and river estuaries.

Chirac (French pronunciation: [ʃiʁak]; Occitan: Chairac) is a former commune in the Lozère département in southern France. On 1 January 2016, it was merged into the new commune of Bourgs-sur-Colagne. Its population was 1,135 in 2022.

== Geography ==
Situated on the banks of the Colagne river in the heart of the Massif central. The D809 road passes through the village.

== Population ==
Historical population
Year	Pop.	±% p.a.
1962	801	—
1968	789	−0.25%
1975	689	−1.92%
1982	894	+3.79%
1990	983	+1.19%
1999	1,006	+0.26%
2006	1,080	+1.02%
2022	1,135	+0.31%
Source: EHESS and INSEE

== Places and monuments ==
- The Fare dolmen
- The twelfth century Romanesque church.
- The chapel of Saint-Jean-Baptiste.
- The family chapels of the Chazette and the Volmanières
- The English cross: The English, who ravaged the country in the 14th century, were soundly beaten in a battle on the heights of the village. This place carries today the name of Cemetery of the English or Cross of the English. A cross, on which there is an inscription "CH des M" and "1701 - 1922", marks the site of the battle. During the construction of the A75 autoroute, the cross was renovated and moved a few metres from its original position.
- The bridge over the Colagne river.

== Activities ==
As in the majority of the towns of Lozère, the principal activity is farming, although service industry sectors have started to play a larger part in the region.

- Farming is essentially sheep and cattle. The size of the upland meadows allows the farmers to have comparatively large flocks.

== Notable people ==
- Colonel Marceau Crespin (1915–1988)
- Nicolaï Greschny (1912–1985), artist

== See also ==
- Communes of the Lozère department
