= Montrodat =

- Commune
- Coat of arms
- Location of Montrodat
- Location within France Location within Occitanie
- Coordinates: 44°33′09″N 3°19′47″E
- Country: France
- Region: Occitania
- Department: Lozère
- Arrondissement: Mende
- Canton: Bourgs sur Colagne
- Intercommunality: Gévaudan

Government
  - Mayor (2020–2026): Rémi André
- Area^{1}: 20.65 km^{2} (7.97 sq mi)
- Elevation: 764 m (2,507 ft)
- Highest elevation: 1,103 m (3,619 ft)
- Lowest elevation: 640 m (2,100 ft)
- Population (2023): 1,174
  - Density: 56.85/km^{2} (147.2/sq mi)
- Time zone: UTC+01:00 (CET)
  - Summer (DST): UTC+02:00 (CEST)
- INSEE/Postal code: 48103 /48100
- ^{1} French Land Register data, which excludes lakes, ponds, glaciers > 1 km^{2} (0.386 sq mi or 247 acres) and river estuaries.

Montrodat (French pronunciation: [mɔ̃ʁɔda]; Occitan: [munruˈdat]) is a commune in the Lozère departement in southern France. The commune is home to a Natura 2000 site, the « falaises de Barjac et causse des Blanquets ».

== See also ==
- Communes of the Lozère department
