= Cultures, Lozère =

Cultures
- Commune
- Location of Cultures
- Location within France Location within Occitanie
- Coordinates: 44°29′38″N 3°22′43″E
- Country: France
- Region: Occitania
- Department: Lozère
- Arrondissement: Mende
- Canton: Bourgs sur Colagne
- Intercommunality: Aubrac Lot Causses Tarn

Government
  - Mayor (2020–2026): Jean-Sébastien Salendres
- Area^{1}: 3.96 km^{2} (1.53 sq mi)
- Elevation: 730 m (2,400 ft)
- Highest elevation: 1,000 m (3,300 ft)
- Lowest elevation: 650 m (2,130 ft)
- Population (2023): 189
  - Density: 47.7/km^{2} (124/sq mi)
- Time zone: UTC+01:00 (CET)
  - Summer (DST): UTC+02:00 (CEST)
- INSEE/Postal code: 48055 /48230
- ^{1} French Land Register data, which excludes lakes, ponds, glaciers > 1 km^{2} (0.386 sq mi or 247 acres) and river estuaries.

Cultures (French pronunciation: [kyltyʁ]; Occitan: Colturas) is a commune in the Lozère department in southern France.

== See also ==
- Communes of the Lozère department
