= Saint-Bonnet-de-Chirac =

- Commune
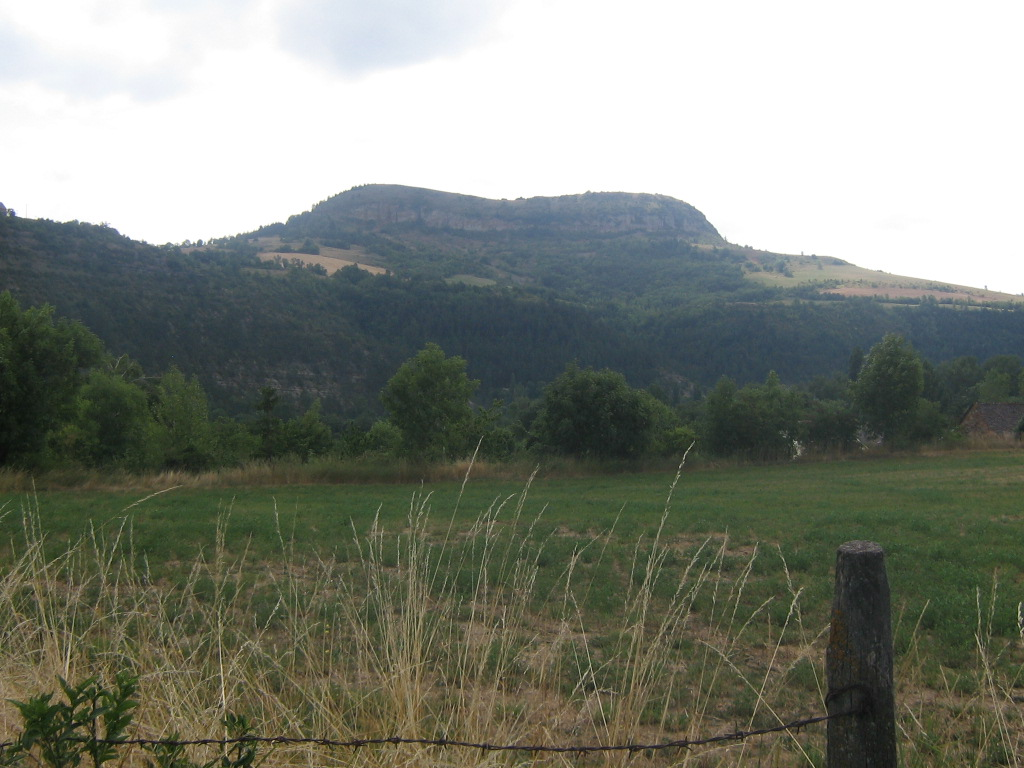
- The Truc de Saint-Bonnet-de-Chirac at 942 m (3,091 ft)
- Location of Saint-Bonnet-de-Chirac
- Location within France Location within Occitanie
- Coordinates: 44°30′51″N 3°17′02″E
- Country: France
- Region: Occitania
- Department: Lozère
- Arrondissement: Mende
- Canton: Bourgs sur Colagne
- Intercommunality: Gévaudan

Government
  - Mayor (2020–2026): Isabelle Recoulin
- Area^{1}: 7.68 km^{2} (2.97 sq mi)
- Elevation: 650 m (2,130 ft)
- Highest elevation: 960 m (3,150 ft)
- Lowest elevation: 579 m (1,900 ft)
- Population (2023): 72
  - Density: 9.4/km^{2} (24/sq mi)
- Time zone: UTC+01:00 (CET)
  - Summer (DST): UTC+02:00 (CEST)
- INSEE/Postal code: 48138 /48100
- ^{1} French Land Register data, which excludes lakes, ponds, glaciers > 1 km^{2} (0.386 sq mi or 247 acres) and river estuaries.

Saint-Bonnet-de-Chirac (French pronunciation: [sɛ̃ bɔnɛ də ʃiʁak]; Occitan: Sant Bonet) is a commune in the Lozère department in southern France.

== Geography ==
The Colagne forms part of the commune's south-western border, then flows into the Lot, which forms part of the commune's southern border.

== See also ==
- Communes of the Lozère department
