= Barjac, Lozère =

Barjac
- Commune
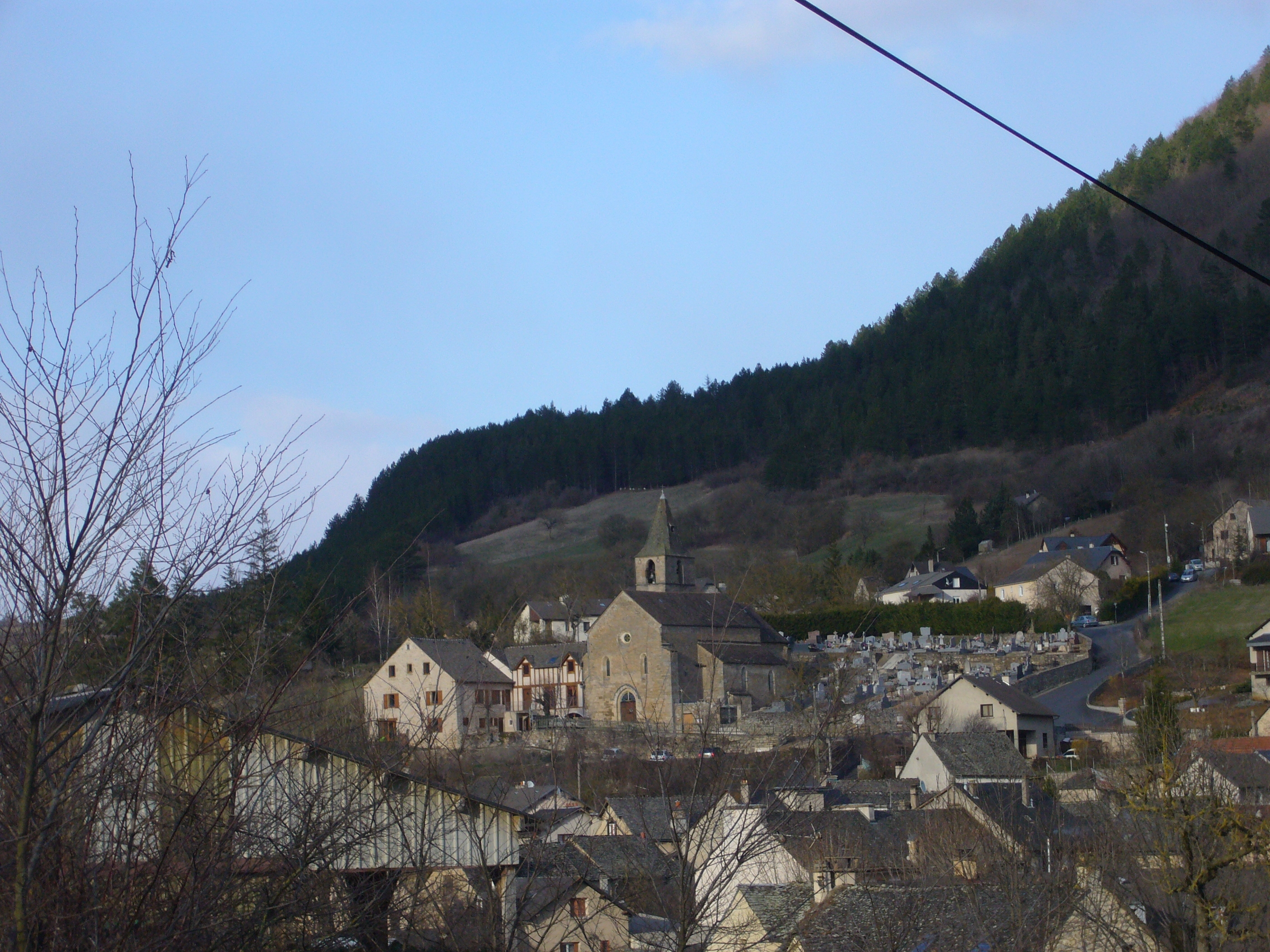
- A general view of Barjac
- Location of Barjac
- Location within France Location within Occitanie
- Coordinates: 44°30′19″N 3°24′41″E
- Country: France
- Region: Occitania
- Department: Lozère
- Arrondissement: Mende
- Canton: Bourgs sur Colagne
- Intercommunality: CC Cœur de Lozère

Government
  - Mayor (2020–2026): Francis Bergogne
- Area^{1}: 29.92 km^{2} (11.55 sq mi)
- Elevation: 660 m (2,170 ft)
- Highest elevation: 1,212 m (3,976 ft)
- Lowest elevation: 650 m (2,130 ft)
- Population (2023): 806
  - Density: 26.9/km^{2} (69.8/sq mi)
- Time zone: UTC+01:00 (CET)
  - Summer (DST): UTC+02:00 (CEST)
- INSEE/Postal code: 48018 /48000
- ^{1} French Land Register data, which excludes lakes, ponds, glaciers > 1 km^{2} (0.386 sq mi or 247 acres) and river estuaries.

Barjac (French pronunciation: [baʁʒak]) is a commune in the Lozère department in southern France.

== Population ==
Historical population
Year	Pop.	±% p.a.
1968	399	—
1975	411	+0.42%
1982	445	+1.14%
1990	557	+2.85%
1999	598	+0.79%
2007	647	+0.99%
2012	704	+1.70%
2017	751	+1.30%
2023	806	+1.18%
Source: INSEE

== See also ==
- Communes of the Lozère department
