= Les Salelles, Lozère =

Les Salelles
- Commune
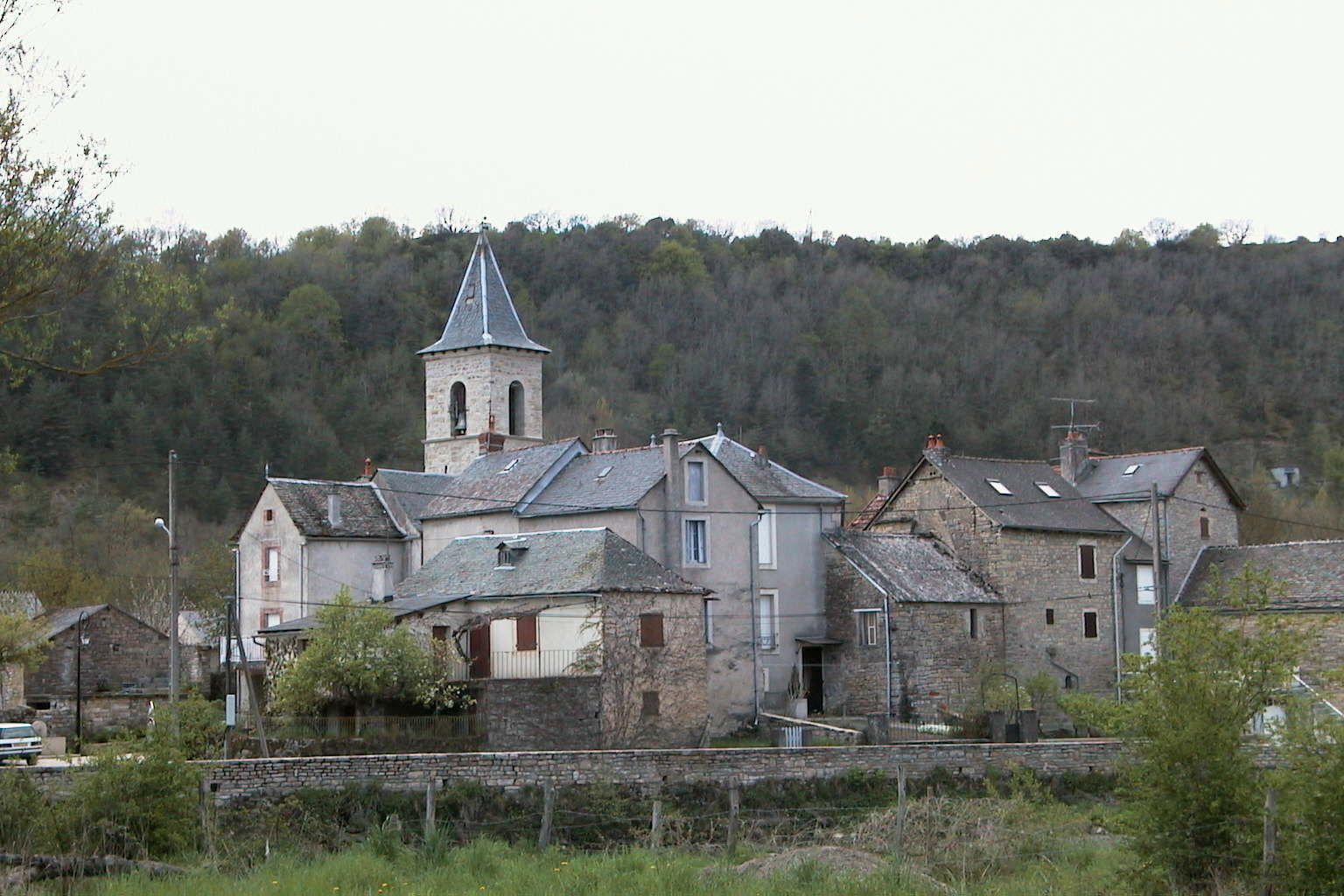
- A view of the church in the village of Les Salelles
- Location of Les Salelles
- Location within France Location within Occitanie
- Coordinates: 44°28′56″N 3°16′48″E
- Country: France
- Region: Occitania
- Department: Lozère
- Arrondissement: Mende
- Canton: Bourgs sur Colagne
- Intercommunality: Aubrac Lot Causses Tarn

Government
  - Mayor (2020–2026): Suzanne Badaroux
- Area^{1}: 10.62 km^{2} (4.10 sq mi)
- Elevation: 622 m (2,041 ft)
- Highest elevation: 940 m (3,080 ft)
- Lowest elevation: 580 m (1,900 ft)
- Population (2023): 167
  - Density: 15.7/km^{2} (40.7/sq mi)
- Time zone: UTC+01:00 (CET)
  - Summer (DST): UTC+02:00 (CEST)
- INSEE/Postal code: 48185 /48230
- ^{1} French Land Register data, which excludes lakes, ponds, glaciers > 1 km^{2} (0.386 sq mi or 247 acres) and river estuaries.

Les Salelles (French pronunciation: [le salɛl]) is a commune in the Lozère department in the region Occitanie in southern France. Its inhabitants are called Les Salellois.

== Geography ==
Les Salelles is on the left bank of river Lot, near the commune of Chanac.

== History ==
In December 2003, an exceptional flooding of the river Lot destroyed part of the bridge and the road. The bridge was repaired.

== Population ==
Historical population

Year	Pop.	±% p.a.
1793	512	—
1821	530	+0.12%
1846	510	−0.15%
1872	432	−0.64%
1901	406	−0.21%
1926	257	−1.81%
1946	223	−0.71%
1962	183	−1.23%
1968	149	−3.37%

Year	Pop.	±% p.a.
1975	118	−3.28%
1982	90	−3.80%
1990	99	+1.20%
1999	118	+1.97%
2007	149	+2.96%
2012	155	+0.79%
2017	164	+1.14%
2023	167	+0.30%

Source: Cassini and INSEE

== Religious buildings ==
- Church from the 14th century

== Events ==
- Town fair on 15 August
- Bread fair in Autumn

== See also ==
- Communes of the Lozère department
