= Gabrias =

- Commune
- Location of Gabrias
- Location within France Location within Occitanie
- Coordinates: 44°32′45″N 3°22′25″E
- Country: France
- Region: Occitania
- Department: Lozère
- Arrondissement: Mende
- Canton: Bourgs sur Colagne
- Intercommunality: Gévaudan

Government
  - Mayor (2021–2026): Bernard Rousset
- Area^{1}: 20.65 km^{2} (7.97 sq mi)
- Elevation: 903 m (2,963 ft)
- Highest elevation: 1,200 m (3,900 ft)
- Lowest elevation: 717 m (2,352 ft)
- Population (2023): 158
  - Density: 7.65/km^{2} (19.8/sq mi)
- Time zone: UTC+01:00 (CET)
  - Summer (DST): UTC+02:00 (CEST)
- INSEE/Postal code: 48068 /48100
- ^{1} French Land Register data, which excludes lakes, ponds, glaciers > 1 km^{2} (0.386 sq mi or 247 acres) and river estuaries.

Gabrias is a commune in the Lozère department in southern France.

== Population ==
Historical population
Year	Pop.	±% p.a.
1968	156	—
1975	149	−0.65%
1982	137	−1.19%
1990	127	−0.94%
1999	125	−0.18%
2007	131	+0.59%
2012	147	+2.33%
2017	152	+0.67%
2023	158	+0.65%
Source: INSEE

== See also ==
- Communes of the Lozère department
