= Canton of Bourgs sur Colagne =

Coordinates: 44.52°N 3.27°E

The canton of Bourgs sur Colagne (before March 2020: canton of Chirac) is an administrative division of the Lozère department, southern France. It was created at the French canton reorganisation which came into effect in March 2015. Its seat is in Bourgs sur Colagne.

It consists of the following communes:

1. Balsièges
2. Barjac
3. Bourgs sur Colagne
4. Cultures
5. Esclanèdes
6. Gabrias
7. Grèzes
8. Montrodat
9. Palhers
10. Saint-Bonnet-de-Chirac
11. Saint-Germain-du-Teil
12. Les Salelles
