= Colagne =

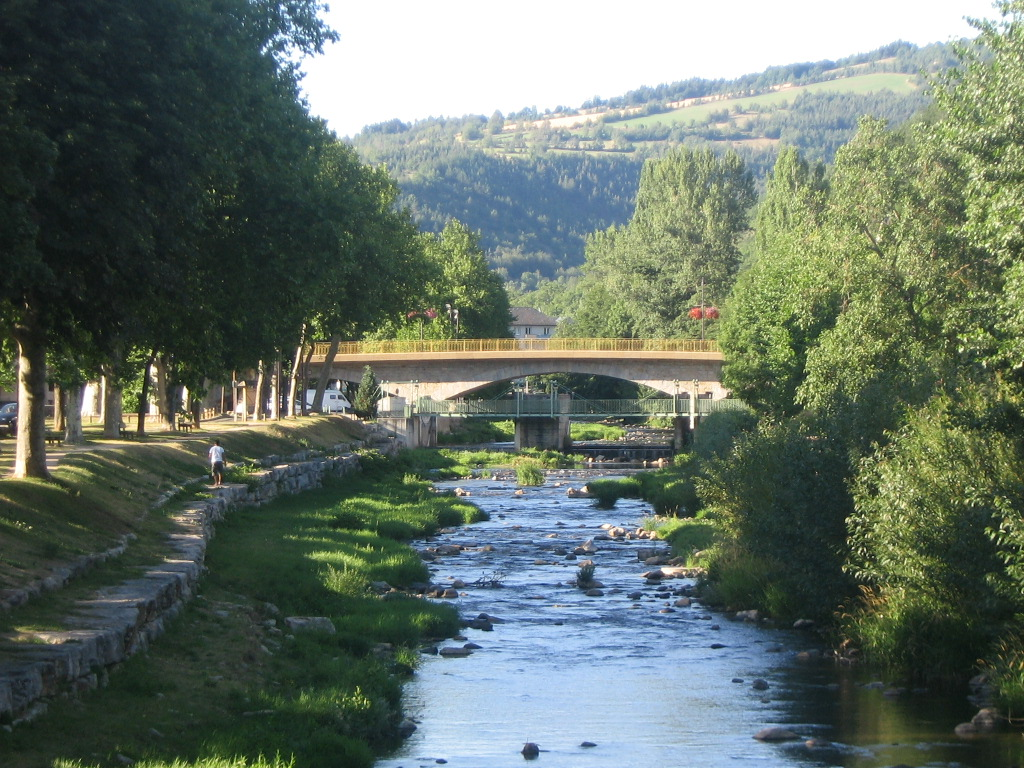
- The Colagne at Marvejols

- Location within France Location within Occitanie

Location
- Country: France

Physical characteristics
- Source
  - location: Arzenc-de-Randon
  - coordinates: 44°38′40″N 03°35′39″E
  - elevation: 1,380 m (4,530 ft)
- Mouth
  - location: Lot
  - coordinates: 44°29′25″N 03°14′44″E
  - elevation: 590 m (1,940 ft)
- Length: 58.4 km (36.3 mi)
- Basin size: 456 km^{2} (176 sq mi)
- Discharge
  - average: 5.08 m^{3}/s (179 cu ft/s)

Basin features
- Progression: Lot→ Garonne→ Gironde estuary→ Atlantic Ocean

The Colagne (French pronunciation: [kɔlaɲ]) is a 58.4-kilometre (36.3 mi) long river in the Lozère département, southeastern France. Its source is in Arzenc-de-Randon. It flows generally southwest. It is a right tributary of the Lot into which it flows between Saint-Bonnet-de-Chirac and Le Monastier-Pin-Moriès.

== Communes along its course ==
This list is ordered from source to mouth:

- Arzenc-de-Randon, Pelouse, Le Born, Rieutort-de-Randon, Saint-Amans, Ribennes, Recoules-de-Fumas, Lachamp, Saint-Léger-de-Peyre, Marvejols, Chirac, Saint-Bonnet-de-Chirac, Le Monastier-Pin-Moriès
