= Grèzes, Lozère =

Grèzes
- Commune
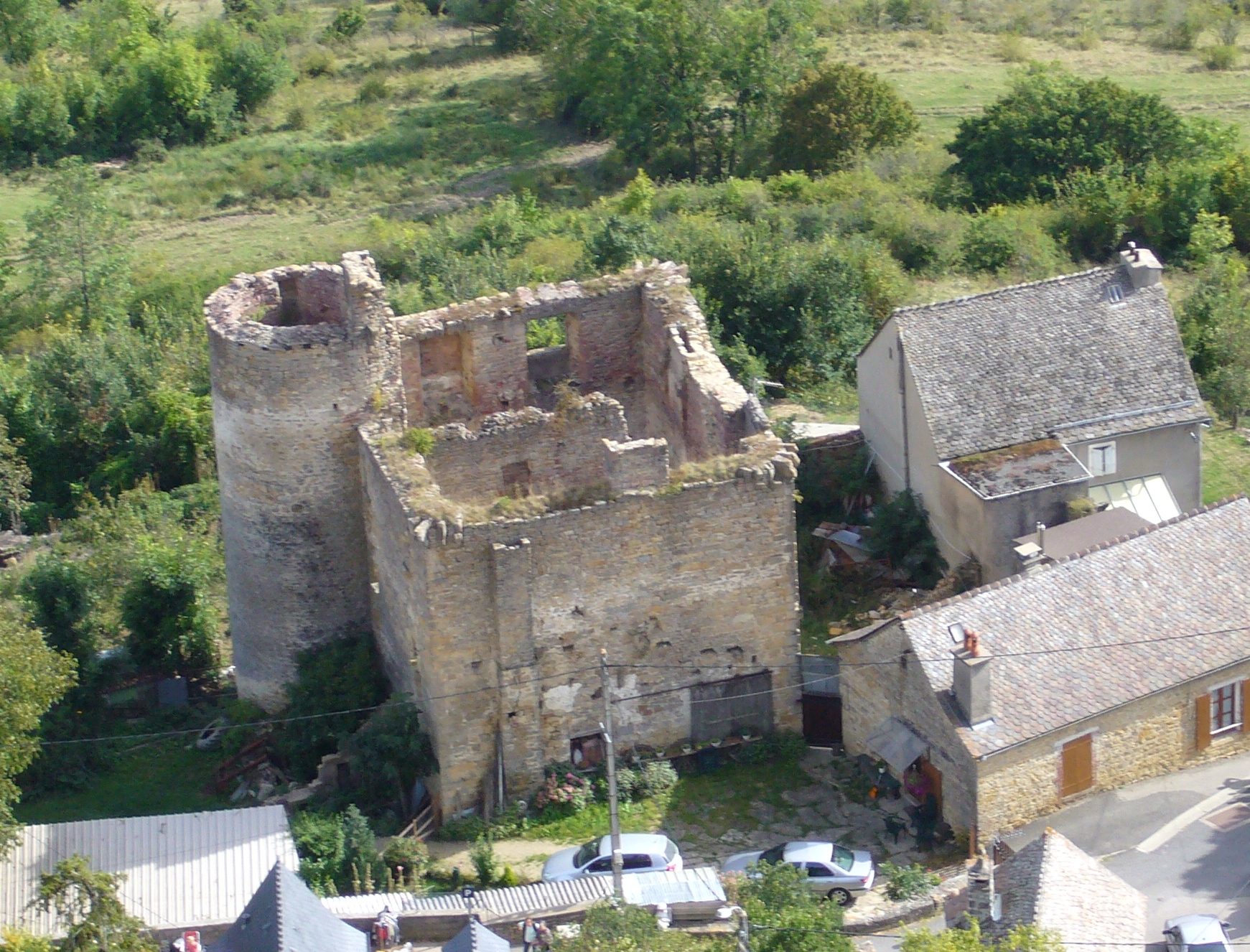
- The château of Grèzes, seen from the Truc de Grèzes
- Location of Grèzes
- Location within France Location within Occitanie
- Coordinates: 44°30′50″N 3°20′21″E
- Country: France
- Region: Occitania
- Department: Lozère
- Arrondissement: Mende
- Canton: Bourgs sur Colagne
- Intercommunality: Gévaudan

Government
  - Mayor (2020–2026): Yannick Charbonnier
- Area^{1}: 16.21 km^{2} (6.26 sq mi)
- Elevation: 890 m (2,920 ft)
- Highest elevation: 1,032 m (3,386 ft)
- Lowest elevation: 709 m (2,326 ft)
- Population (2023): 195
  - Density: 12.0/km^{2} (31.2/sq mi)
- Time zone: UTC+01:00 (CET)
  - Summer (DST): UTC+02:00 (CEST)
- INSEE/Postal code: 48072 /48100
- ^{1} French Land Register data, which excludes lakes, ponds, glaciers > 1 km^{2} (0.386 sq mi or 247 acres) and river estuaries.

Grèzes (French pronunciation: [ɡʁɛz]; Occitan: Grèsas) is a commune in the Lozère department in southern France.

== See also ==
- Communes of the Lozère department
