= Saint-Frézal-de-Ventalon =

- Part of Ventalon-en-Cévennes
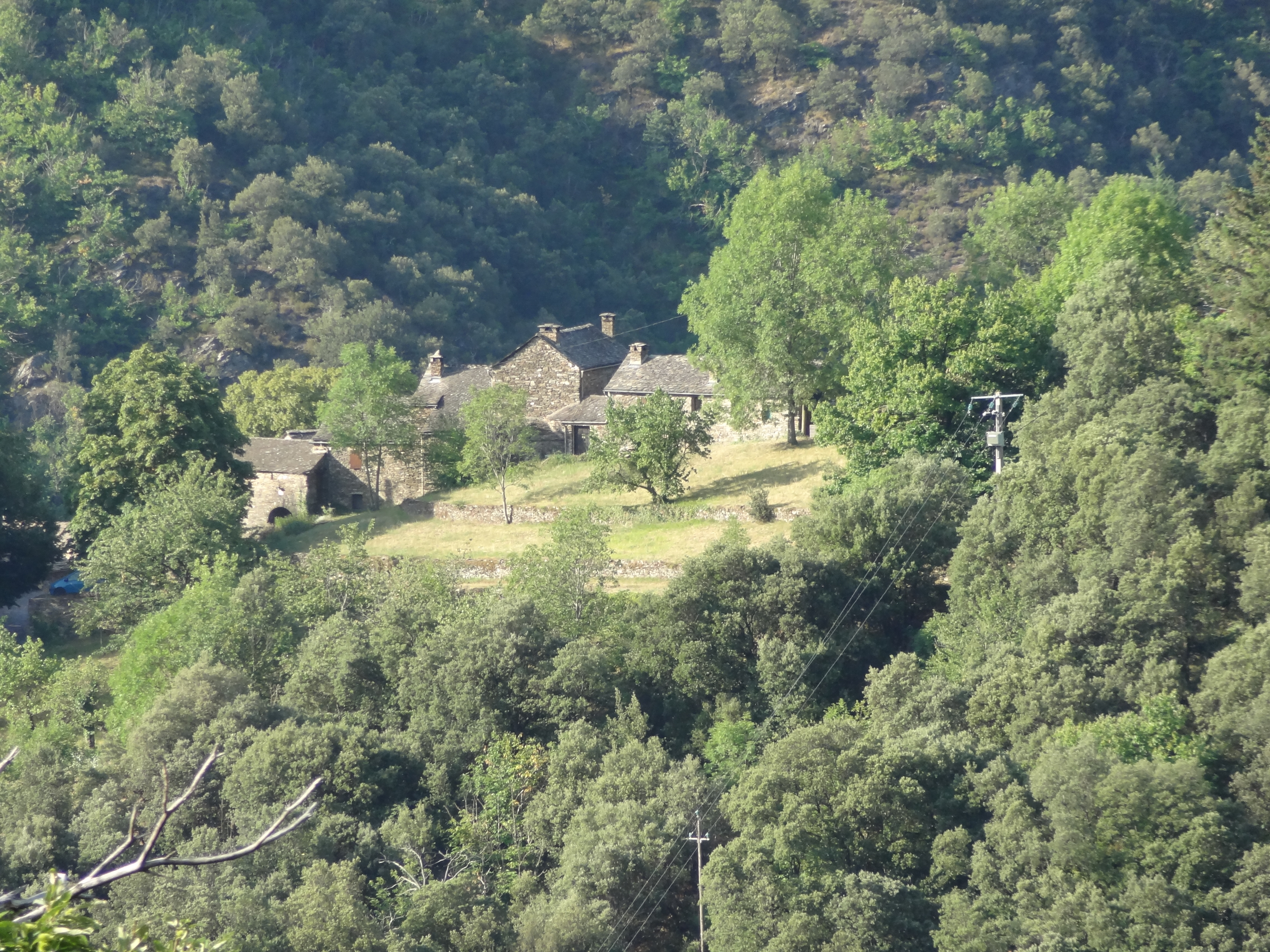
- The hamlet of Viala, in Saint-Frézal-de-Ventalon
- Location of Saint-Frézal-de-Ventalon
- Location within France Location within Occitanie
- Coordinates: 44°17′10″N 3°51′21″E
- Country: France
- Region: Occitania
- Department: Lozère
- Arrondissement: Florac
- Canton: Le Collet-de-Dèze
- Commune: Ventalon-en-Cévennes
- Area^{1}: 16.89 km^{2} (6.52 sq mi)
- Elevation: 620 m (2,030 ft)
- Highest elevation: 1,128 m (3,701 ft)
- Lowest elevation: 378 m (1,240 ft)
- Population (2022): 167
  - Density: 9.89/km^{2} (25.6/sq mi)
- Time zone: UTC+01:00 (CET)
  - Summer (DST): UTC+02:00 (CEST)
- Postal code: 48240
- ^{1} French Land Register data, which excludes lakes, ponds, glaciers > 1 km^{2} (0.386 sq mi or 247 acres) and river estuaries.

Saint-Frézal-de-Ventalon (Occitan: Sent Fresald de Ventalon) is a former commune in the Lozère department in southern France. On 1 January 2016, it was merged into the new commune of Ventalon-en-Cévennes.

== See also ==
- Communes of the Lozère department
