= Saint-Julien-d'Arpaon =

Former commune in Lozère, France

- Part of Cans-et-Cévennes
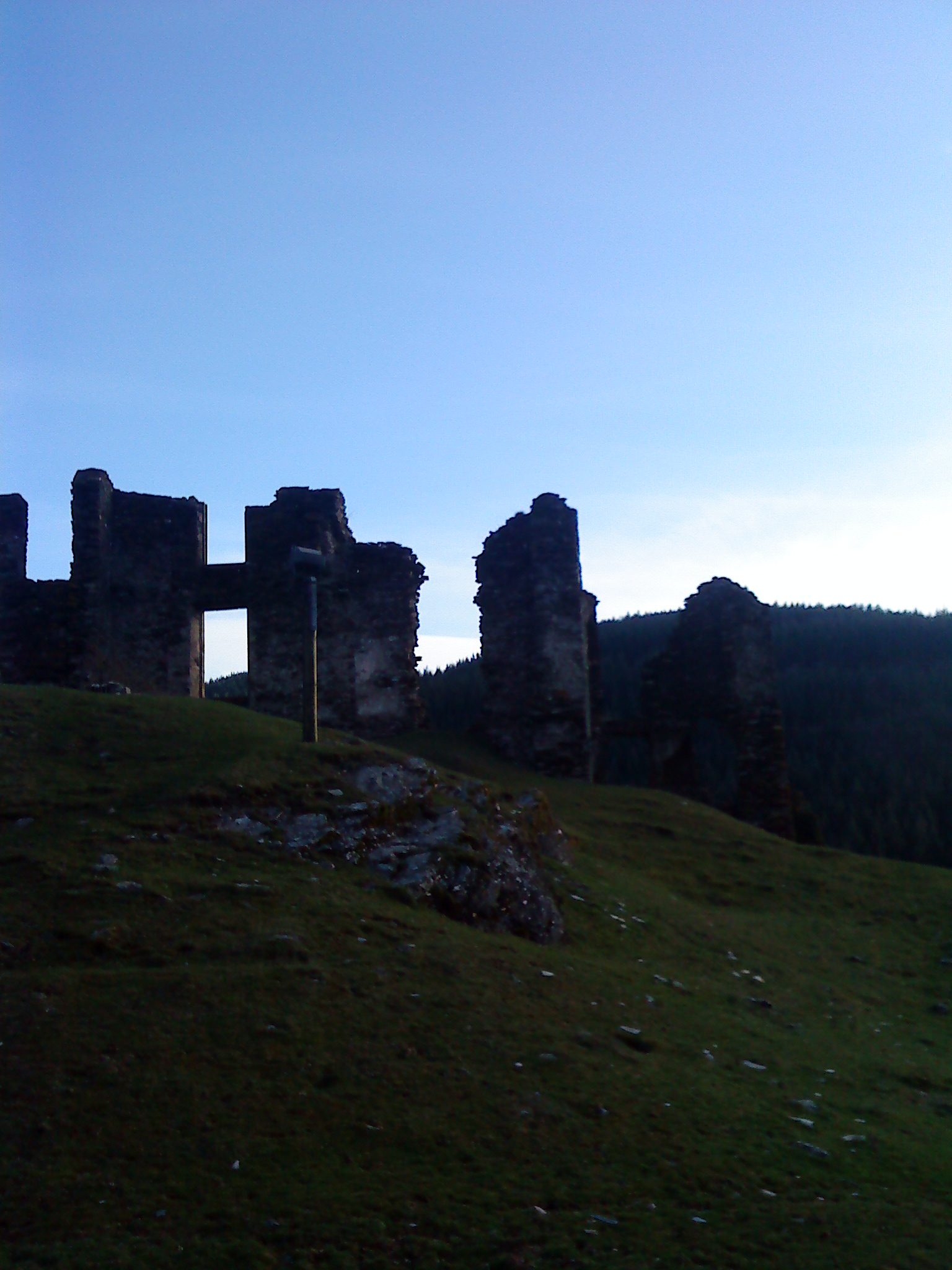
- The ruins of the château in Saint-Julien-d'Arpaon
- Location of Saint-Julien-d'Arpaon
- Location within France Location within Occitanie
- Coordinates: 44°18′01″N 3°39′59″E
- Country: France
- Region: Occitania
- Department: Lozère
- Arrondissement: Florac
- Canton: Le Collet-de-Dèze
- Commune: Cans-et-Cévennes
- Area^{1}: 20.72 km^{2} (8.00 sq mi)
- Elevation: 610 m (2,000 ft)
- Highest elevation: 1,421 m (4,662 ft)
- Lowest elevation: 580 m (1,900 ft)
- Population (2022): 94
  - Density: 4.5/km^{2} (12/sq mi)
- Time zone: UTC+01:00 (CET)
  - Summer (DST): UTC+02:00 (CEST)
- Postal code: 48400
- ^{1} French Land Register data, which excludes lakes, ponds, glaciers > 1 km^{2} (0.386 sq mi or 247 acres) and river estuaries.

Saint-Julien-d'Arpaon (French pronunciation: [sɛ̃ ʒyljɛ̃ daʁpaɔ̃]; Occitan: Sent Julian d'Arpaon) is a former commune in the Lozère department in southern France. On 1 January 2016, it was merged into the new commune of Cans-et-Cévennes. Its population was 94 in 2022.

Saint-Julien-d'Arpaon stands at a crossing of the river Mimente on the Robert Louis Stevenson Trail (GR 70), a popular long-distance path following approximately the route travelled by Robert Louis Stevenson in 1878 and described in his book Travels with a Donkey in the Cévennes. Stevenson mentions the village and its ruined chateau in passing, though not by name:

...the road passed hard by two black hamlets, one with an old castle atop to please the heart of the tourist.

== See also ==
- Communes of the Lozère department
