= Saint-Andéol-de-Clerguemort =

- Part of Ventalon-en-Cévennes
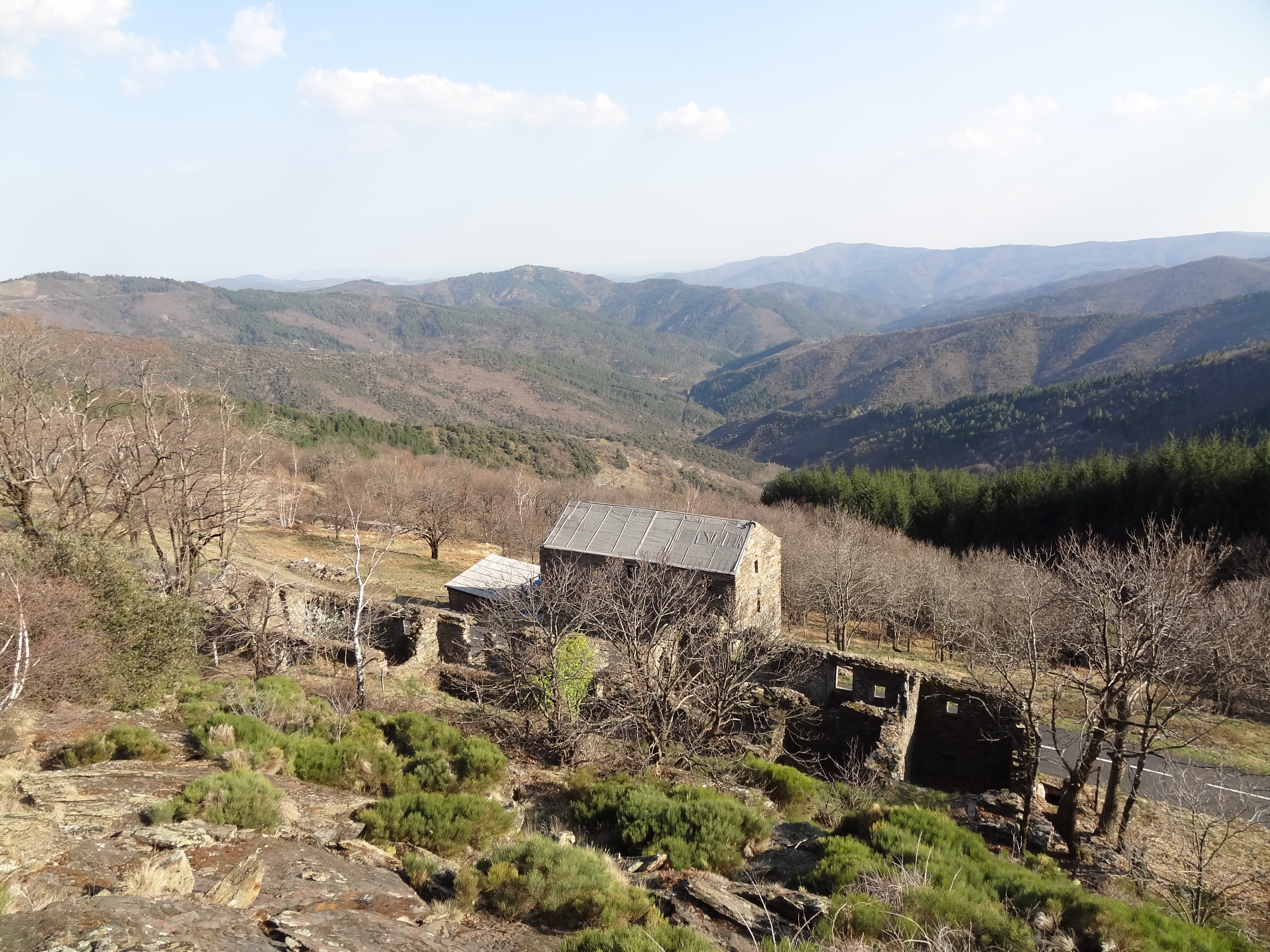
- A view from the hamlet of Espinas, in Saint-Andéol-de-Clerguemort

- Coat of arms
- Location of Saint-Andéol-de-Clerguemort
- Location within France Location within Occitanie
- Coordinates: 44°17′34″N 3°54′29″E
- Country: France
- Region: Occitania
- Department: Lozère
- Arrondissement: Florac
- Canton: Le Collet-de-Dèze
- Commune: Ventalon-en-Cévennes
- Area^{1}: 6.86 km^{2} (2.65 sq mi)
- Elevation: 500 m (1,600 ft)
- Highest elevation: 970 m (3,180 ft)
- Lowest elevation: 379 m (1,243 ft)
- Population (2022): 91
  - Density: 13/km^{2} (34/sq mi)
- Time zone: UTC+01:00 (CET)
  - Summer (DST): UTC+02:00 (CEST)
- Postal code: 48160
- ^{1} French Land Register data, which excludes lakes, ponds, glaciers > 1 km^{2} (0.386 sq mi or 247 acres) and river estuaries.

Saint-Andéol-de-Clerguemort (French pronunciation: [sɛ̃.t‿ɑ̃deɔl də klɛʁɡəmɔʁ]; Occitan: Sent Andiòu del Clèrguemòrt) is a former commune in the Lozère department in southern France. On 1 January 2016, it was merged into the new commune of Ventalon-en-Cévennes. Its population was 91 in 2022.

== See also ==
- Communes of the Lozère department
