= Saint-Laurent-de-Trèves =

- Part of Cans-et-Cévennes
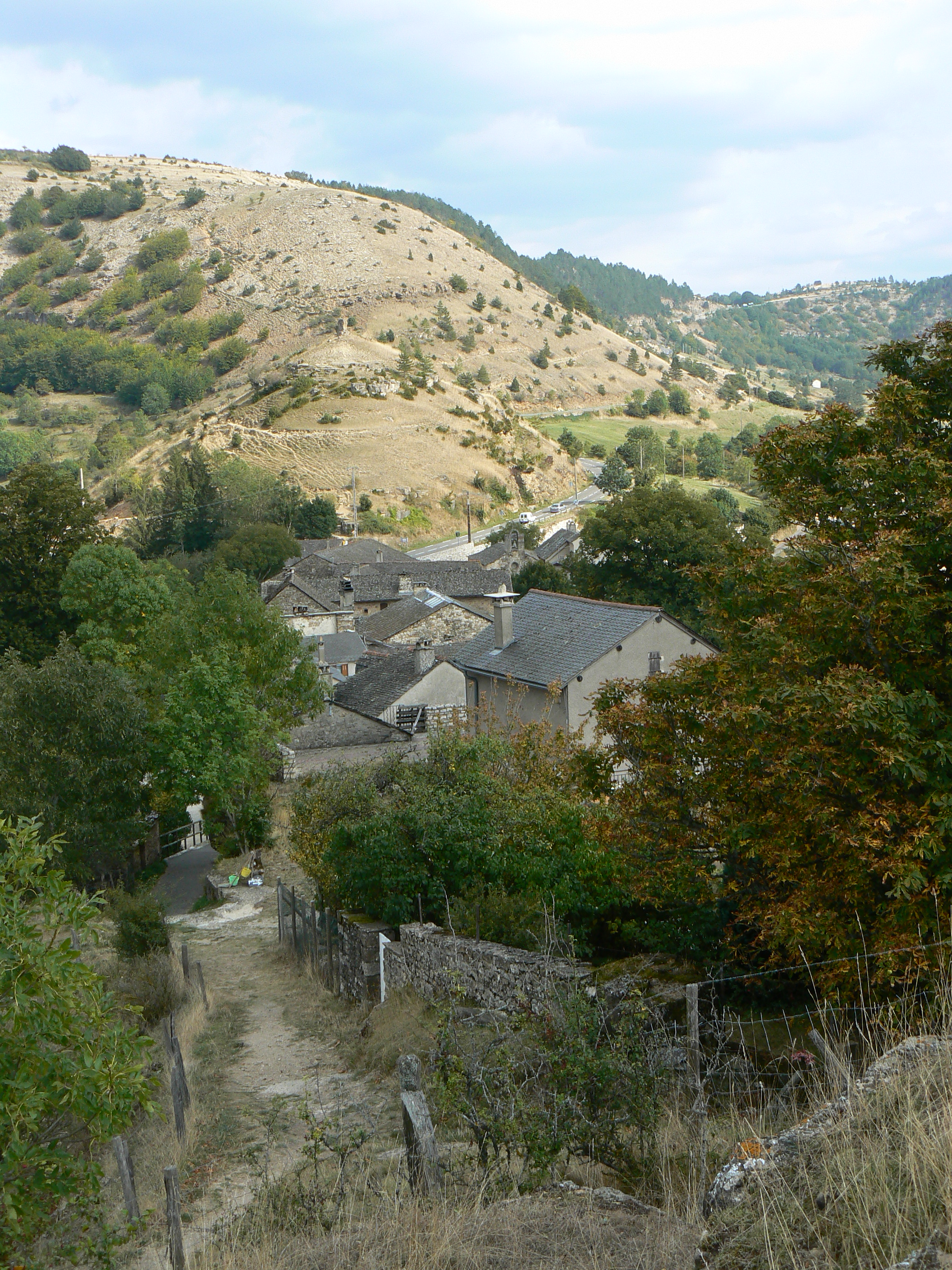
- A general view of Saint-Laurent-de-Trèves

- Coat of arms
- Location of Saint-Laurent-de-Trèves
- Location within France Location within Occitanie
- Coordinates: 44°16′19″N 3°36′12″E
- Country: France
- Region: Occitania
- Department: Lozère
- Arrondissement: Florac
- Canton: Le Collet-de-Dèze
- Commune: Cans-et-Cévennes
- Area^{1}: 23.09 km^{2} (8.92 sq mi)
- Elevation: 900 m (3,000 ft)
- Highest elevation: 1,166 m (3,825 ft)
- Lowest elevation: 568 m (1,864 ft)
- Population (2022): 194
  - Density: 8.40/km^{2} (21.8/sq mi)
- Time zone: UTC+01:00 (CET)
  - Summer (DST): UTC+02:00 (CEST)
- Postal code: 48400
- ^{1} French Land Register data, which excludes lakes, ponds, glaciers > 1 km^{2} (0.386 sq mi or 247 acres) and river estuaries.

Saint-Laurent-de-Trèves (French pronunciation: [sɛ̃ loʁɑ̃ də tʁɛv]; Occitan: Sent Laurenç de Trevas) is a former commune in the Lozère department in southern France. On 1 January 2016, it was merged into the new commune of Cans-et-Cévennes.

== See also ==
- Communes of the Lozère department
- Causse Méjean
