= Matthieu Merle =

Huguenot captain during the Wars of Religion (1548-1587)

Matthieu Merle (c.1548 in Uzès – after 1587) was a Huguenot captain who sowed terror in the south of the Auvergne, Gévaudan and Velay during the Wars of Religion. Captain Merle is an example of the possibilities of social climbing and enrichment offered by the religious troubles.

== Biography ==
He was one of three sons of Antoine Merle, an ennobled merchant from Uzès, and Marguerite de Virgilli. He was married on 20 October 1576 at the sovereign castle (château souverain or Castelsoubro) of Roffiac, to Françoise d'Auzolles, daughter of Guillot d'Auzolles, seigneur of Serre and Françoise de La Rochette. They are known to have had two children, Marie and Heralh (1583-1621), Baron de Lagorce and his father's heir.

In 1568, he entered the service of D'Acier as an arquebusier in his guard. It was probably under D'Acier's influence that he converted to Calvinism and subsequently converted his two older brothers, Antoine et François. He played an active part in the civil wars between 1568 and 1580, winning a reputation for cruelty, particularly during the taking of Malzieu in Gévaudan in 1573 and Issoire in 1575. At the head of his bands, he acquired considerable riches from collecting ransoms and spoils. While his father had owned a single house in Uzès, two farms and a vineyard, Merls was able, thanks to his gains, to but the government of Marvejols in 1575, the manor of Lagorce in June 1582, and other fiefdoms in Vivarais.

On 28 April 1578, he was made a gentilhomme ordinaire ("gentleman of the bed-chamber") by the King of Navarre, as well as Governor of Mende. In July 1581, he retired in style to Uzès. The date of his death is not known precisely. The Marquis d'Aubais placed it at the start of 1584, but several attest that Merle was still living after the Battle of Coutras, at the end of 1587.

His Mémoires, incomplete, were edited by one of his companions at arms, Colonel Gondin.

== Campaigns ==
- Between 1569 and 1576, the fortress of Grèzes was occupied by his troops.
- On 17 November 1573, he seized the town of Malzieu in Gévaudan, accompanied by 25 to 30 soldiers and assassinated 13 priests as well as curé (parson) of Rimeize. He locked the most notable inhabitants in the tower and held them to ransom.
- In 1574, he seized Ambert.
- In 1575, he seized and ransomed the town of Issoire.
- He failed before Saint-Flour in August 1578.
- On Christmas night, 1579, Merle seized the capital of Gévaudan, Mende, which had resisted him for two years. Coming from Marvejols, Merle's soldiers waited until the inhabitants were at midnight mass before entering the town, which they pillaged. They then melted down the Non Pareille, the biggest bell in the world in order to make culverins and cannonballs.
- In December 1580, he attacked Bédouès and its collegiate church created by Pope Urban V, killing the canons and pillaging the village.
- In February 1581, while reigning over all of Gévaudan, he carried out a threat that he made to the inhabitants. He had asked them to give him 4,000 écus, a sum the people of Mende could not collect. He partially destroyed the Cathedral built by Urban V. He saved its bell tower so as not to damage the Bishop's Place in which he had established his residence.
