= Cocurès =

Commune in Lozère, France

- Part of Bédouès-Cocurès
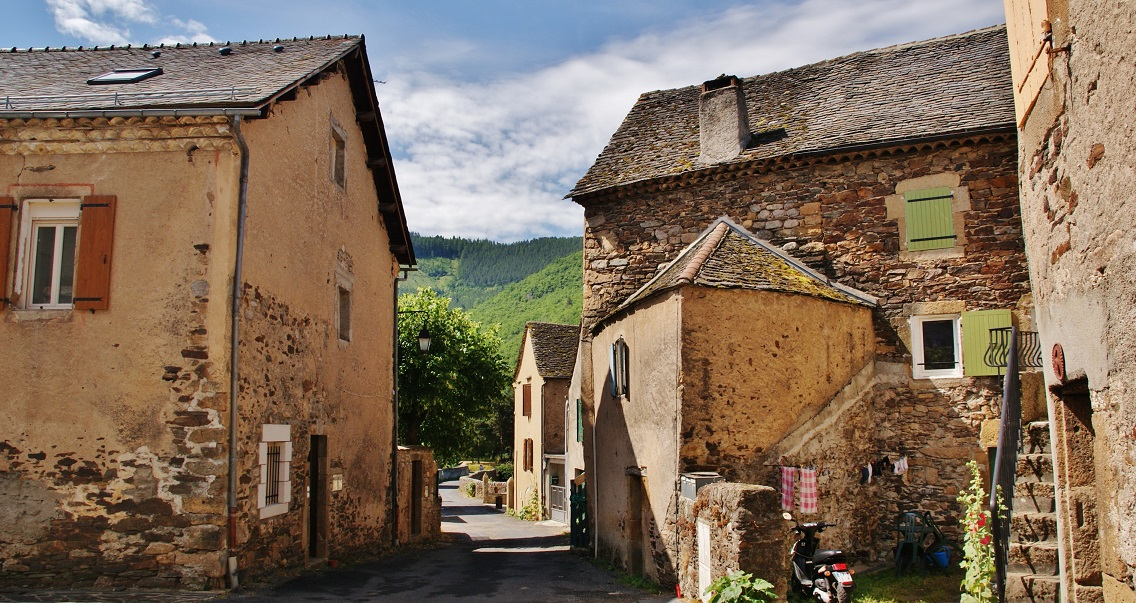
- A view within the village of Cocurès

- Coat of arms
- Location of Cocurès
- Location within France Location within Occitanie
- Coordinates: 44°20′57″N 3°37′16″E
- Country: France
- Region: Occitania
- Department: Lozère
- Arrondissement: Florac
- Canton: Saint-Étienne-du-Valdonnez
- Commune: Bédouès-Cocurès
- Area^{1}: 3.55 km^{2} (1.37 sq mi)
- Elevation: 606 m (1,988 ft)
- Highest elevation: 980 m (3,220 ft)
- Lowest elevation: 561 m (1,841 ft)
- Population (2017): 190
  - Density: 54/km^{2} (140/sq mi)
- Time zone: UTC+01:00 (CET)
  - Summer (DST): UTC+02:00 (CEST)
- Postal code: 48400
- ^{1} French Land Register data, which excludes lakes, ponds, glaciers > 1 km^{2} (0.386 sq mi or 247 acres) and river estuaries.

Cocurès (French pronunciation: [kɔkyʁɛs]) is a former commune in the Lozère department in southern France. On 1 January 2016, it was merged into the new commune of Bédouès-Cocurès.

== See also ==
- Communes of the Lozère department
