= Gabriac =

Gabriac is the name of two communes in France:

- Gabriac, Aveyron, in the department of Aveyron
- Gabriac, Lozère, in the department of Lozère
