= Moissac-Vallée-Française =

- Commune
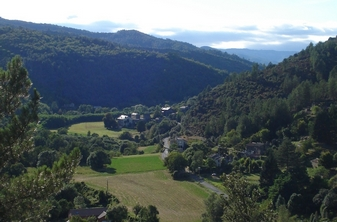
- A view of Moissac's valley, toward the north from the old castle

- Coat of arms
- Location of Moissac-Vallée-Française
- Location within France Location within Occitanie
- Coordinates: 44°09′50″N 3°47′07″E
- Country: France
- Region: Occitania
- Department: Lozère
- Arrondissement: Florac
- Canton: Le Collet-de-Dèze
- Intercommunality: CC des Cévennes au Mont Lozère

Government
  - Mayor (2022–2026): Philippe Flayol
- Area^{1}: 27.05 km^{2} (10.44 sq mi)
- Elevation: 300 m (980 ft)
- Highest elevation: 768 m (2,520 ft)
- Lowest elevation: 256 m (840 ft)
- Population (2023): 216
  - Density: 7.99/km^{2} (20.7/sq mi)
- Time zone: UTC+01:00 (CET)
  - Summer (DST): UTC+02:00 (CEST)
- INSEE/Postal code: 48097 /48110
- ^{1} French Land Register data, which excludes lakes, ponds, glaciers > 1 km^{2} (0.386 sq mi or 247 acres) and river estuaries.

Moissac-Vallée-Française (French pronunciation: [mwasak vale fʁɑ̃sɛːz]; Occitan: Moissac de Valfrancesca) is a commune in the Lozère département in southern France.

== See also ==
- Communes of the Lozère department
