= Saint-Michel-de-Dèze =

- Commune
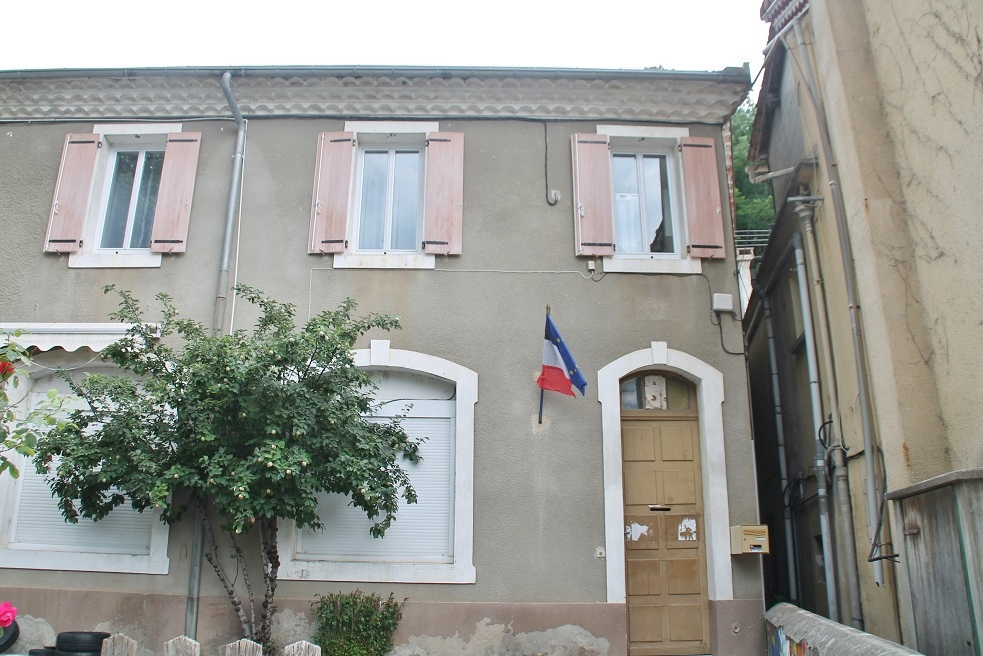
- Town hall
- Location of Saint-Michel-de-Dèze
- Location within France Location within Occitanie
- Coordinates: 44°15′03″N 3°53′50″E
- Country: France
- Region: Occitania
- Department: Lozère
- Arrondissement: Florac
- Canton: Le Collet-de-Dèze
- Intercommunality: CC des Cévennes au Mont Lozère

Government
  - Mayor (2020–2026): Michel Bonnet
- Area^{1}: 14.19 km^{2} (5.48 sq mi)
- Elevation: 320 m (1,050 ft)
- Highest elevation: 975 m (3,199 ft)
- Lowest elevation: 309 m (1,014 ft)
- Population (2023): 226
  - Density: 15.9/km^{2} (41.2/sq mi)
- Time zone: UTC+01:00 (CET)
  - Summer (DST): UTC+02:00 (CEST)
- INSEE/Postal code: 48173 /48160
- ^{1} French Land Register data, which excludes lakes, ponds, glaciers > 1 km^{2} (0.386 sq mi or 247 acres) and river estuaries.

Saint-Michel-de-Dèze (French pronunciation: [sɛ̃ miʃɛl də dɛz]; Occitan: Sent Miquèu de Dèsa) is a commune in the Lozère department in southern France.

== See also ==
- Communes of the Lozère department
