= Molezon =

- Commune
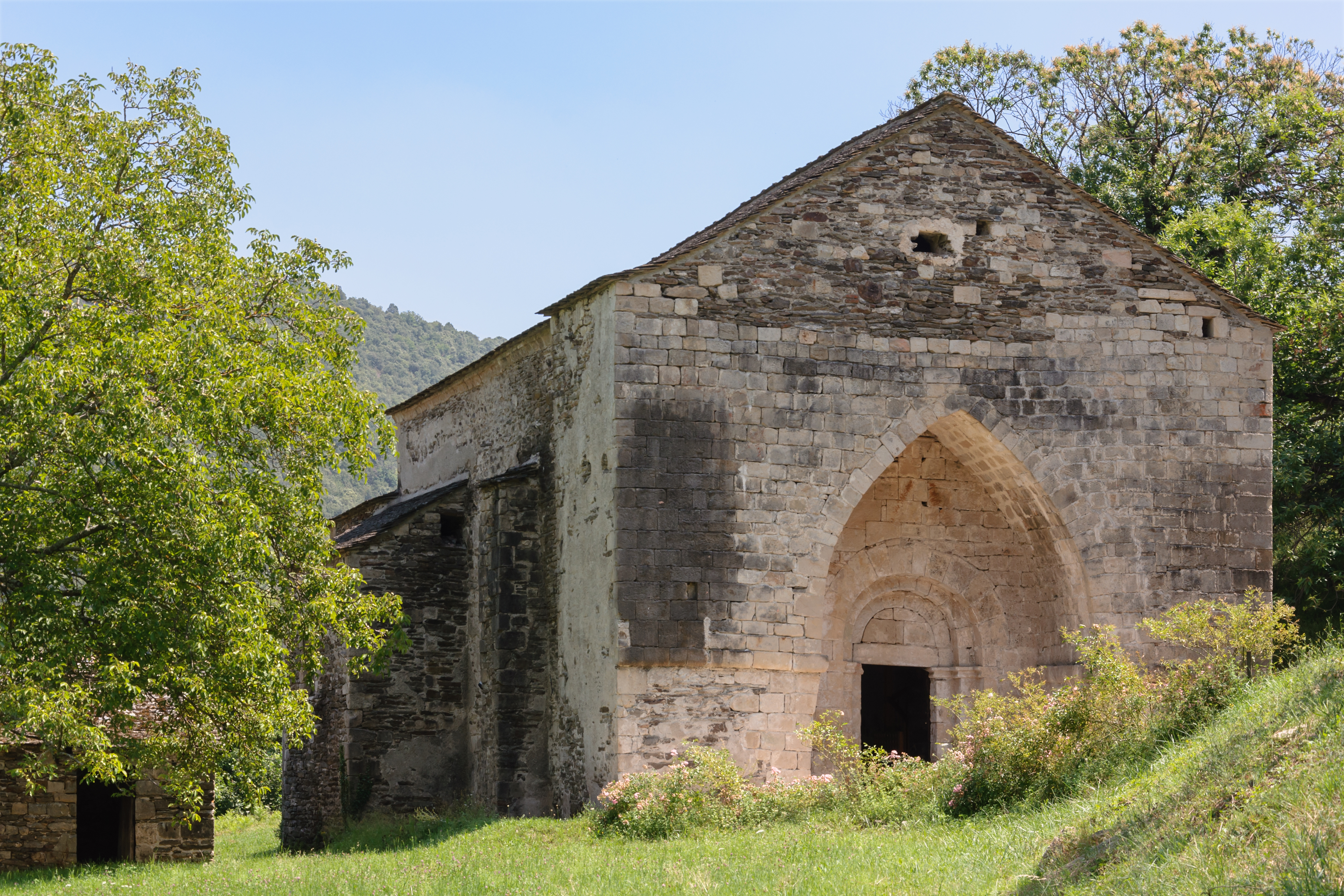
- The old church of Molezon
- Location of Molezon
- Location within France Location within Occitanie
- Coordinates: 44°12′33″N 3°40′55″E
- Country: France
- Region: Occitania
- Department: Lozère
- Arrondissement: Florac
- Canton: Le Collet-de-Dèze
- Intercommunality: CC des Cévennes au Mont Lozère

Government
  - Mayor (2020–2026): David Flayol
- Area^{1}: 14.76 km^{2} (5.70 sq mi)
- Elevation: 450 m (1,480 ft)
- Highest elevation: 1,011 m (3,317 ft)
- Lowest elevation: 389 m (1,276 ft)
- Population (2023): 99
  - Density: 6.7/km^{2} (17/sq mi)
- Time zone: UTC+01:00 (CET)
  - Summer (DST): UTC+02:00 (CEST)
- INSEE/Postal code: 48098 /48110
- ^{1} French Land Register data, which excludes lakes, ponds, glaciers > 1 km^{2} (0.386 sq mi or 247 acres) and river estuaries.

Molezon (French pronunciation: [mɔlzɔ̃]; Occitan: Moleson) is a commune in the Lozère département in southern France.

== See also ==
- Communes of the Lozère department
