= Bédouès-Cocurès =

- Commune
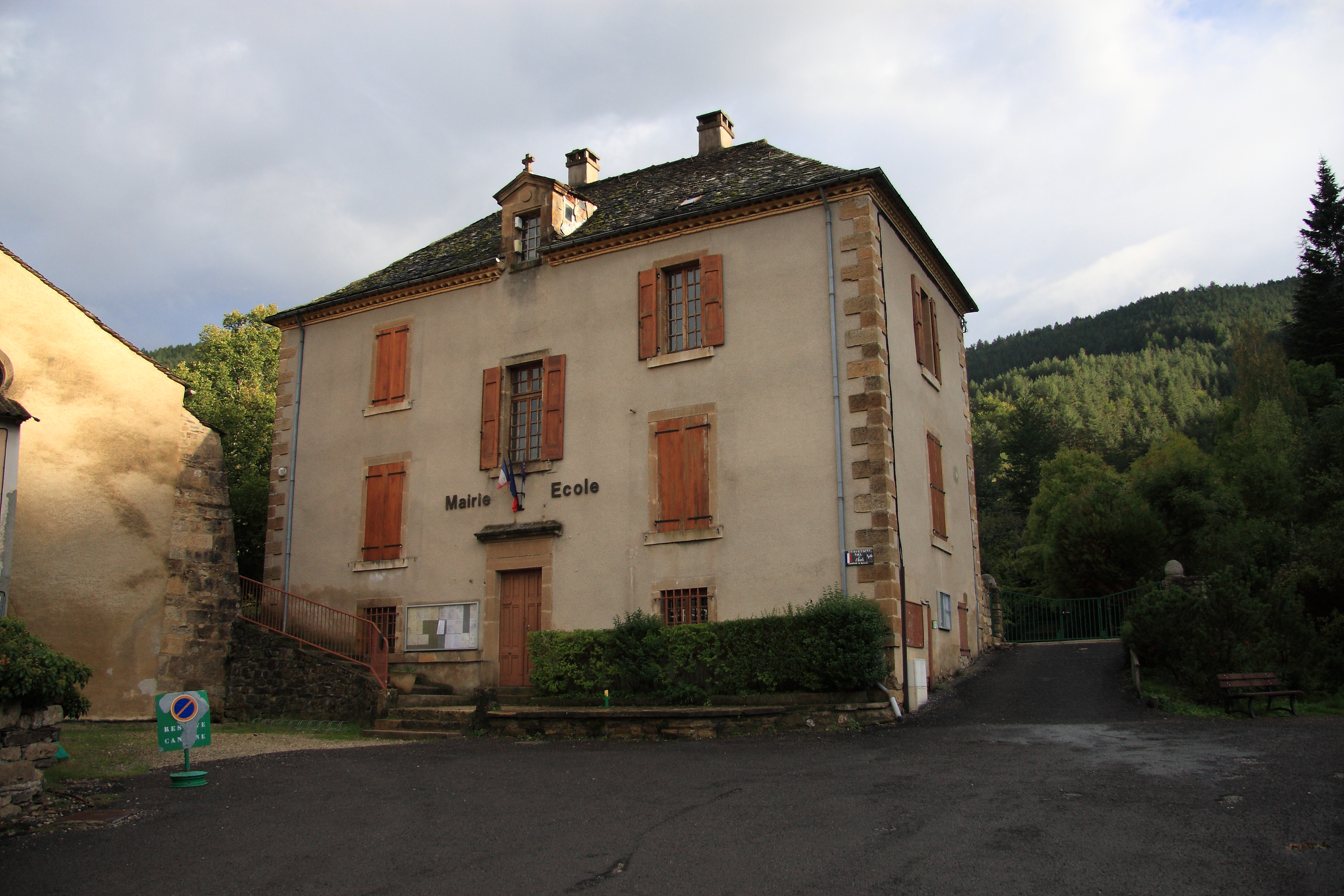
- Bédouès-Cocurès Town hall
- Location of Bédouès-Cocurès
- Location within France Location within Occitanie
- Coordinates: 44°20′53″N 3°37′12″E
- Country: France
- Region: Occitania
- Department: Lozère
- Arrondissement: Florac
- Canton: Saint-Étienne-du-Valdonnez

Government
  - Mayor (2020–2026): Marie-Thérèse Chapelle
- Area^{1}: 30.35 km^{2} (11.72 sq mi)
- Population (2023): 457
  - Density: 15.1/km^{2} (39.0/sq mi)
- Time zone: UTC+01:00 (CET)
  - Summer (DST): UTC+02:00 (CEST)
- INSEE/Postal code: 48050 /48400
- ^{1} French Land Register data, which excludes lakes, ponds, glaciers > 1 km^{2} (0.386 sq mi or 247 acres) and river estuaries.

Bédouès-Cocurès (French pronunciation: [bedwɛs kɔkyʁɛs]; Occitan: Bedoesc e Cocurès) is a commune in the department of Lozère, southern France. The municipality was established on 1 January 2016 by merger of the former communes of Bédouès and Cocurès.

== See also ==
- Communes of the Lozère department
