= Bédouès =

Commune in Lozère, France

- Part of Bédouès-Cocurès
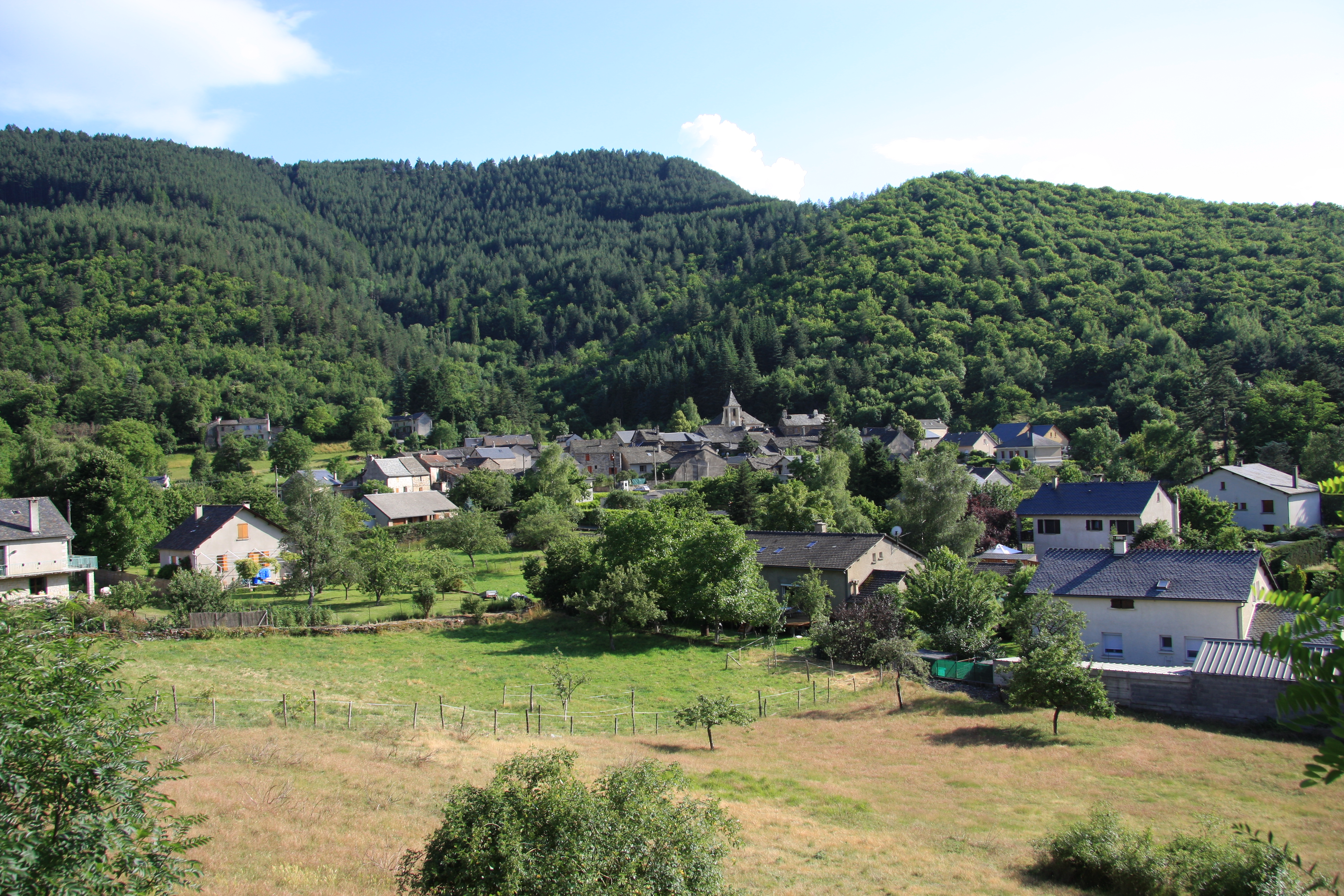
- A general view from the promontory of the collegiate church of Bédouès

- Coat of arms
- Location of Bédouès
- Location within France Location within Occitanie
- Coordinates: 44°20′31″N 3°36′20″E
- Country: France
- Region: Occitania
- Department: Lozère
- Arrondissement: Florac
- Canton: Saint-Étienne-du-Valdonnez
- Commune: Bédouès-Cocurès
- Area^{1}: 26.80 km^{2} (10.35 sq mi)
- Elevation: 560 m (1,840 ft)
- Highest elevation: 1,170 m (3,840 ft)
- Lowest elevation: 540 m (1,770 ft)
- Population (2017): 281
  - Density: 10.5/km^{2} (27.2/sq mi)
- Time zone: UTC+01:00 (CET)
  - Summer (DST): UTC+02:00 (CEST)
- Postal code: 48400
- ^{1} French Land Register data, which excludes lakes, ponds, glaciers > 1 km^{2} (0.386 sq mi or 247 acres) and river estuaries.

Bédouès (French pronunciation: [bedwɛs]; Occitan: Bedoesc) is a former commune in the Lozère department in southern France. On 1 January 2016, it was merged into the new commune of Bédouès-Cocurès.

== Population ==
Historical population

Year	Pop.	±% p.a.
1793	511	—
1821	446	−0.48%
1846	518	+0.60%
1872	522	+0.03%
1901	410	−0.83%
1926	290	−1.38%
1946	250	−0.74%
1962	209	−1.11%

Year	Pop.	±% p.a.
1968	168	−3.57%
1975	156	−1.05%
1982	177	+1.82%
1990	194	+1.15%
1999	299	+4.92%
2006	312	+0.61%
2017	281	−0.95%

Source: EHESS and INSEE

== See also ==
- Communes of the Lozère department
- Château de Miral

== Gallery ==
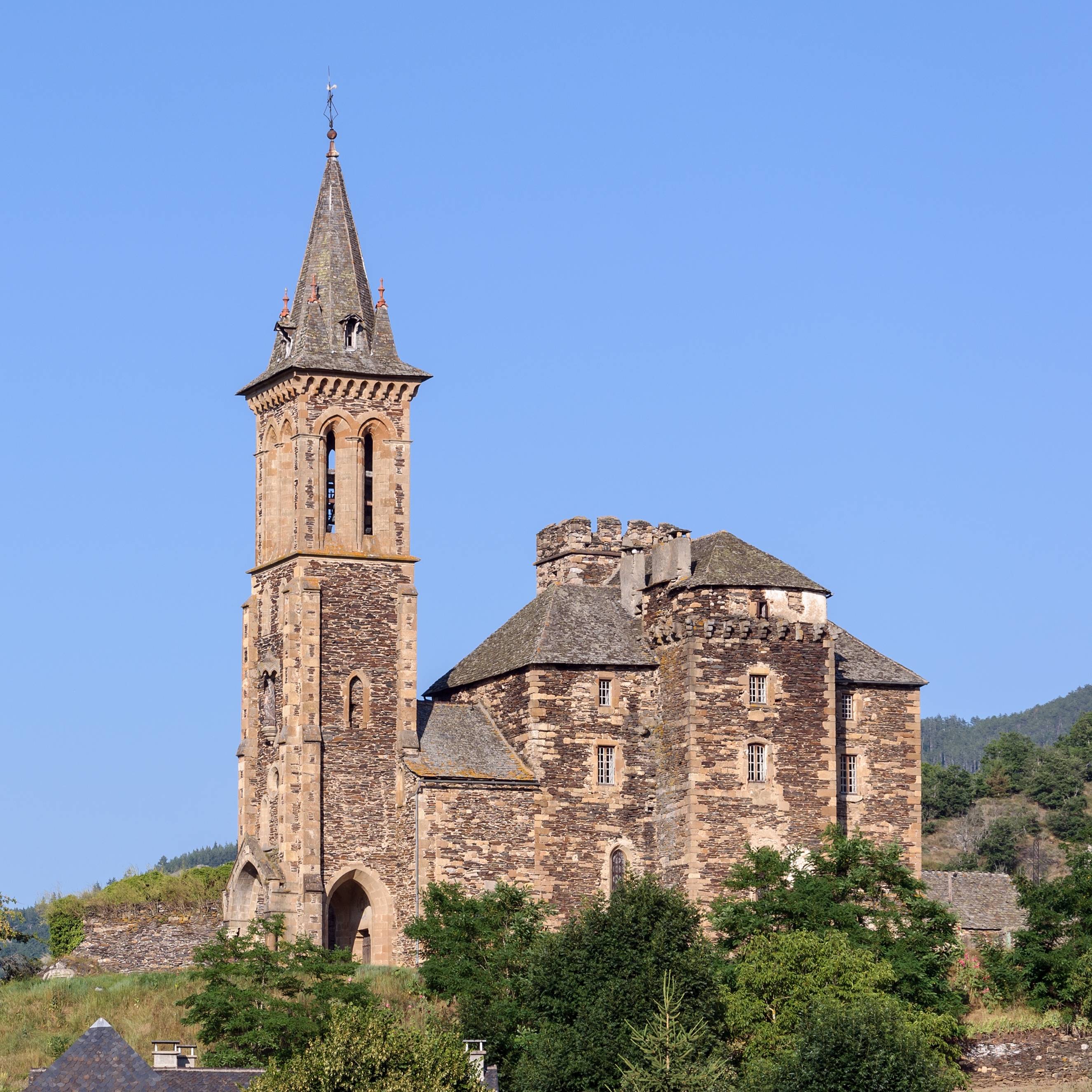
Collegiate church

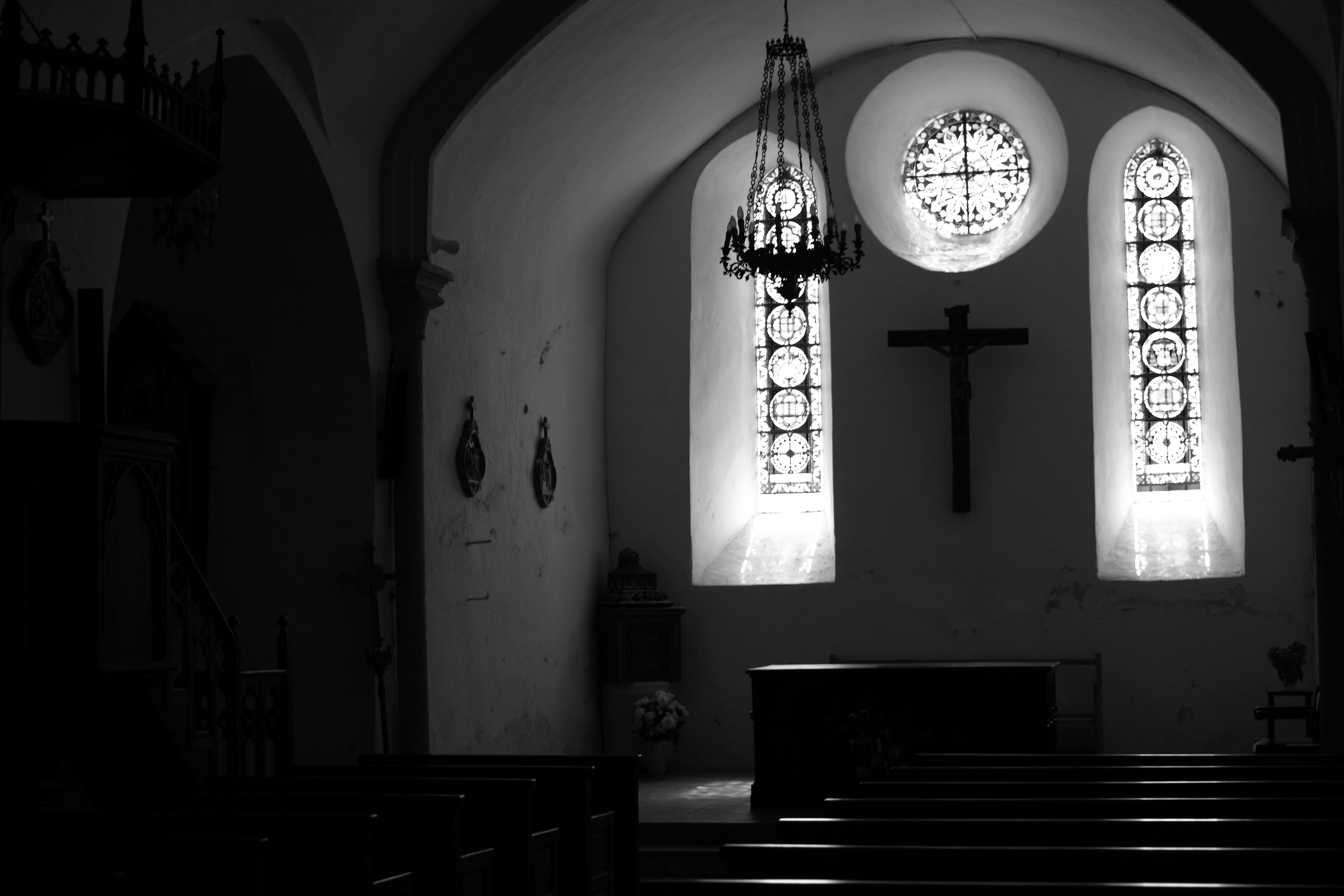
Interior
