= Cans et Cévennes =

- Commune
- Location of Cans et Cévennes
- Location within France Location within Occitanie
- Coordinates: 44°18′04″N 3°39′54″E
- Country: France
- Region: Occitania
- Department: Lozère
- Arrondissement: Florac
- Canton: Le Collet-de-Dèze

Government
  - Mayor (2020–2026): Henri Couderc
- Area^{1}: 43.81 km^{2} (16.92 sq mi)
- Population (2023): 282
  - Density: 6.44/km^{2} (16.7/sq mi)
- Time zone: UTC+01:00 (CET)
  - Summer (DST): UTC+02:00 (CEST)
- INSEE/Postal code: 48166 /48400
- ^{1} French Land Register data, which excludes lakes, ponds, glaciers > 1 km^{2} (0.386 sq mi or 247 acres) and river estuaries.

Cans et Cévennes (French pronunciation: [kɑ̃ e sevɛn]) is a commune in the department of Lozère, southern France. The municipality was established on 1 January 2016 by merger of the former communes of Saint-Laurent-de-Trèves and Saint-Julien-d'Arpaon.

== See also ==
- Communes of the Lozère department
