= Ventalon-en-Cévennes =

- Commune
- Location of Ventalon-en-Cévennes
- Location within France Location within Occitanie
- Coordinates: 44°17′31″N 3°54′29″E
- Country: France
- Region: Occitania
- Department: Lozère
- Arrondissement: Florac
- Canton: Le Collet-de-Dèze
- Area^{1}: 23.75 km^{2} (9.17 sq mi)
- Population (2023): 253
  - Density: 10.7/km^{2} (27.6/sq mi)
- Time zone: UTC+01:00 (CET)
  - Summer (DST): UTC+02:00 (CEST)
- INSEE/Postal code: 48152 /48240, 48160
- ^{1} French Land Register data, which excludes lakes, ponds, glaciers > 1 km^{2} (0.386 sq mi or 247 acres) and river estuaries.

Ventalon-en-Cévennes (Occitan: Ventalon de Cevena) is a commune in the department of Lozère, southern France. The municipality was established on 1 January 2016 by merger of the former communes of Saint-Frézal-de-Ventalon and Saint-Andéol-de-Clerguemort.

== See also ==
- Communes of the Lozère department
