= Rousses =

- Commune
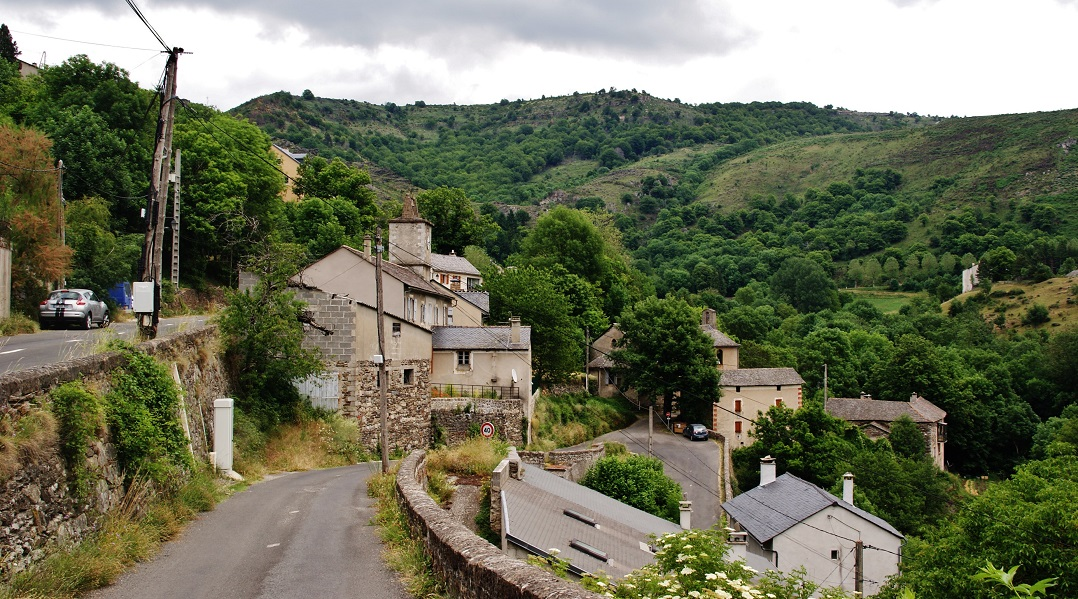
- The village of Rousses
- Location of Rousses
- Location within France Location within Occitanie
- Coordinates: 44°12′24″N 3°35′17″E
- Country: France
- Region: Occitania
- Department: Lozère
- Arrondissement: Florac
- Canton: Le Collet-de-Dèze

Government
  - Mayor (2020–2026): Daniel Giovannacci
- Area^{1}: 22.38 km^{2} (8.64 sq mi)
- Elevation: 743 m (2,438 ft)
- Highest elevation: 1,343 m (4,406 ft)
- Lowest elevation: 660 m (2,170 ft)
- Population (2023): 115
  - Density: 5.14/km^{2} (13.3/sq mi)
- Time zone: UTC+01:00 (CET)
  - Summer (DST): UTC+02:00 (CEST)
- INSEE/Postal code: 48130 /48400
- ^{1} French Land Register data, which excludes lakes, ponds, glaciers > 1 km^{2} (0.386 sq mi or 247 acres) and river estuaries.

Rousses (French pronunciation: [ʁus]; Occitan: Rosses) is a commune in the Lozère department in southern France.

== See also ==
- Communes of the Lozère department
