= Le Pompidou =

- Commune
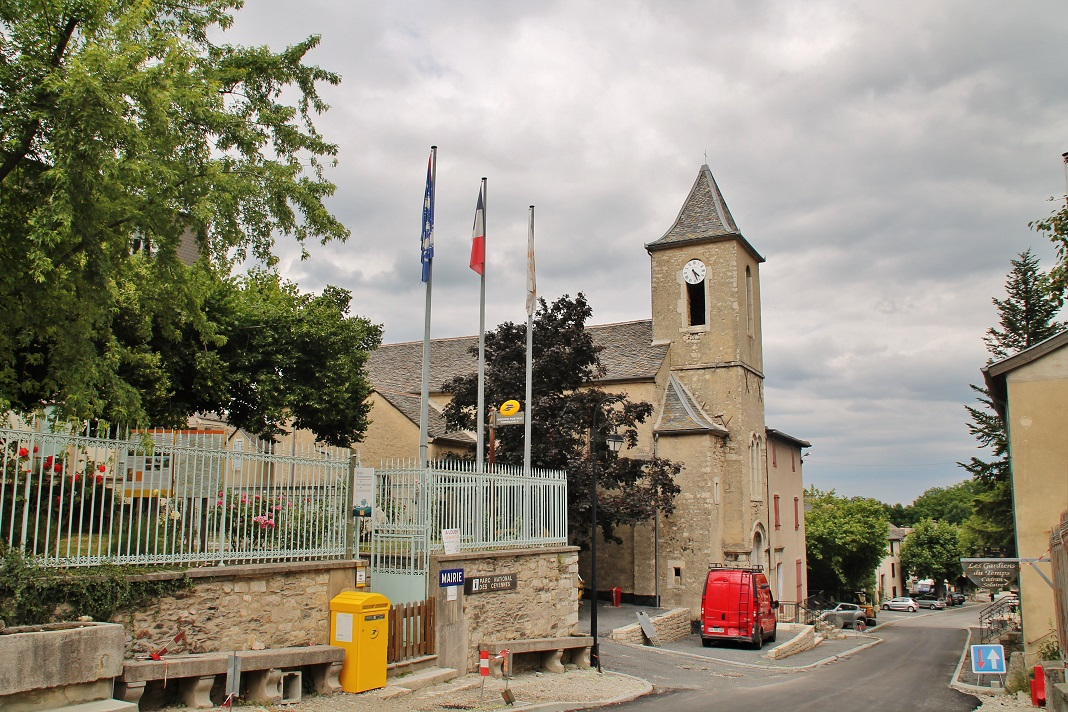
- The church of St Flour, in Le Pompidou
- Location of Le Pompidou
- Location within France Location within Occitanie
- Coordinates: 44°11′46″N 3°39′19″E
- Country: France
- Region: Occitania
- Department: Lozère
- Arrondissement: Florac
- Canton: Le Collet-de-Dèze
- Intercommunality: CC des Cévennes au Mont Lozère

Government
  - Mayor (2020–2026): Françoise Saint-Pierre
- Area^{1}: 22.80 km^{2} (8.80 sq mi)
- Elevation: 750 m (2,460 ft)
- Highest elevation: 1,047 m (3,435 ft)
- Lowest elevation: 379 m (1,243 ft)
- Population (2023): 184
  - Density: 8.07/km^{2} (20.9/sq mi)
- Time zone: UTC+01:00 (CET)
  - Summer (DST): UTC+02:00 (CEST)
- INSEE/Postal code: 48115 /48110
- ^{1} French Land Register data, which excludes lakes, ponds, glaciers > 1 km^{2} (0.386 sq mi or 247 acres) and river estuaries.

Le Pompidou (French pronunciation: [lə pɔ̃pidu]; Occitan: Lo Pompidor) is a commune in the Lozère département in southern France.

== See also ==
- Communes of the Lozère department
