= Saint-Hilaire-de-Lavit =

- Commune
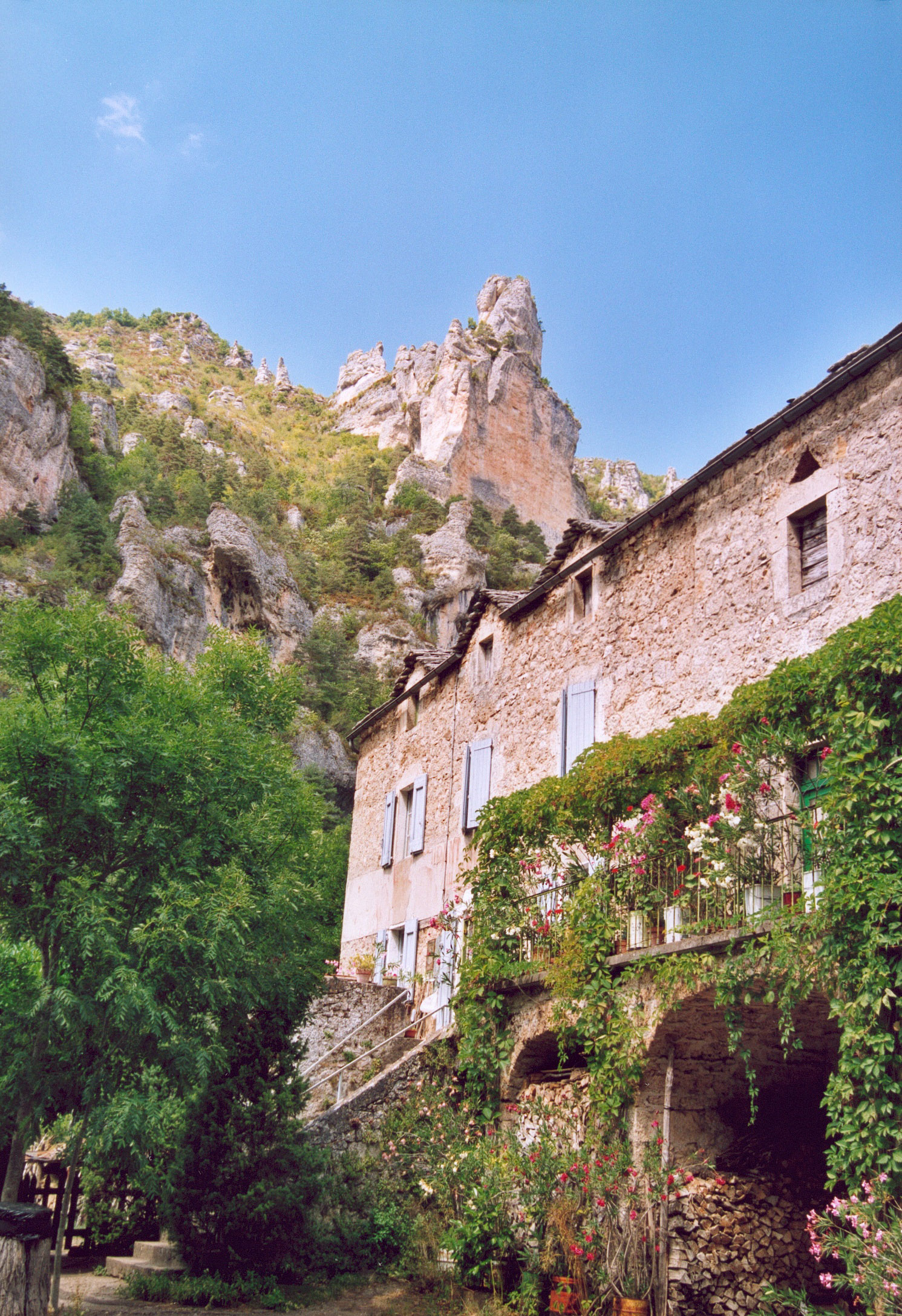
- A view within Saint-Hilaire-de-Lavit
- Location of Saint-Hilaire-de-Lavit
- Location within France Location within Occitanie
- Coordinates: 44°15′15″N 3°51′53″E
- Country: France
- Region: Occitania
- Department: Lozère
- Arrondissement: Florac
- Canton: Le Collet-de-Dèze
- Intercommunality: CC des Cévennes au Mont Lozère

Government
  - Mayor (2024–2026): Jean-Claude Carrez
- Area^{1}: 10.51 km^{2} (4.06 sq mi)
- Elevation: 550 m (1,800 ft)
- Highest elevation: 927 m (3,041 ft)
- Lowest elevation: 333 m (1,093 ft)
- Population (2023): 104
  - Density: 9.90/km^{2} (25.6/sq mi)
- Time zone: UTC+01:00 (CET)
  - Summer (DST): UTC+02:00 (CEST)
- INSEE/Postal code: 48158 /48160
- ^{1} French Land Register data, which excludes lakes, ponds, glaciers > 1 km^{2} (0.386 sq mi or 247 acres) and river estuaries.

Saint-Hilaire-de-Lavit (French pronunciation: [sɛ̃.t‿ilɛʁ də lavi]; Occitan: Sent Alari de la Vit) is a commune in the Lozère department in southern France.

== See also ==
- Communes of the Lozère department
