= Bassurels =

- Commune
- Coat of arms
- Location of Bassurels
- Location within France Location within Occitanie
- Coordinates: 44°10′49″N 3°37′33″E
- Country: France
- Region: Occitania
- Department: Lozère
- Arrondissement: Florac
- Canton: Le Collet-de-Dèze

Government
  - Mayor (2020–2026): Josette Plantier Gaillac
- Area^{1}: 46.34 km^{2} (17.89 sq mi)
- Elevation: 1,000 m (3,300 ft)
- Highest elevation: 1,562 m (5,125 ft)
- Lowest elevation: 553 m (1,814 ft)
- Population (2023): 62
  - Density: 1.3/km^{2} (3.5/sq mi)
- Time zone: UTC+01:00 (CET)
  - Summer (DST): UTC+02:00 (CEST)
- INSEE/Postal code: 48020 /48400
- ^{1} French Land Register data, which excludes lakes, ponds, glaciers > 1 km^{2} (0.386 sq mi or 247 acres) and river estuaries.

Bassurels is a commune in the Lozère department in southern France.

== Population ==
Historical population
Year	Pop.	±% p.a.
1968	85	—
1975	69	−2.94%
1982	58	−2.45%
1990	65	+1.43%
1999	47	−3.54%
2007	71	+5.29%
2012	41	−10.40%
2017	61	+8.27%
2023	62	+0.27%
Source: INSEE

== See also ==
- Communes of the Lozère department
