= Château de Miral =

Coordinates: 44°21′22″N 03°38′28″E

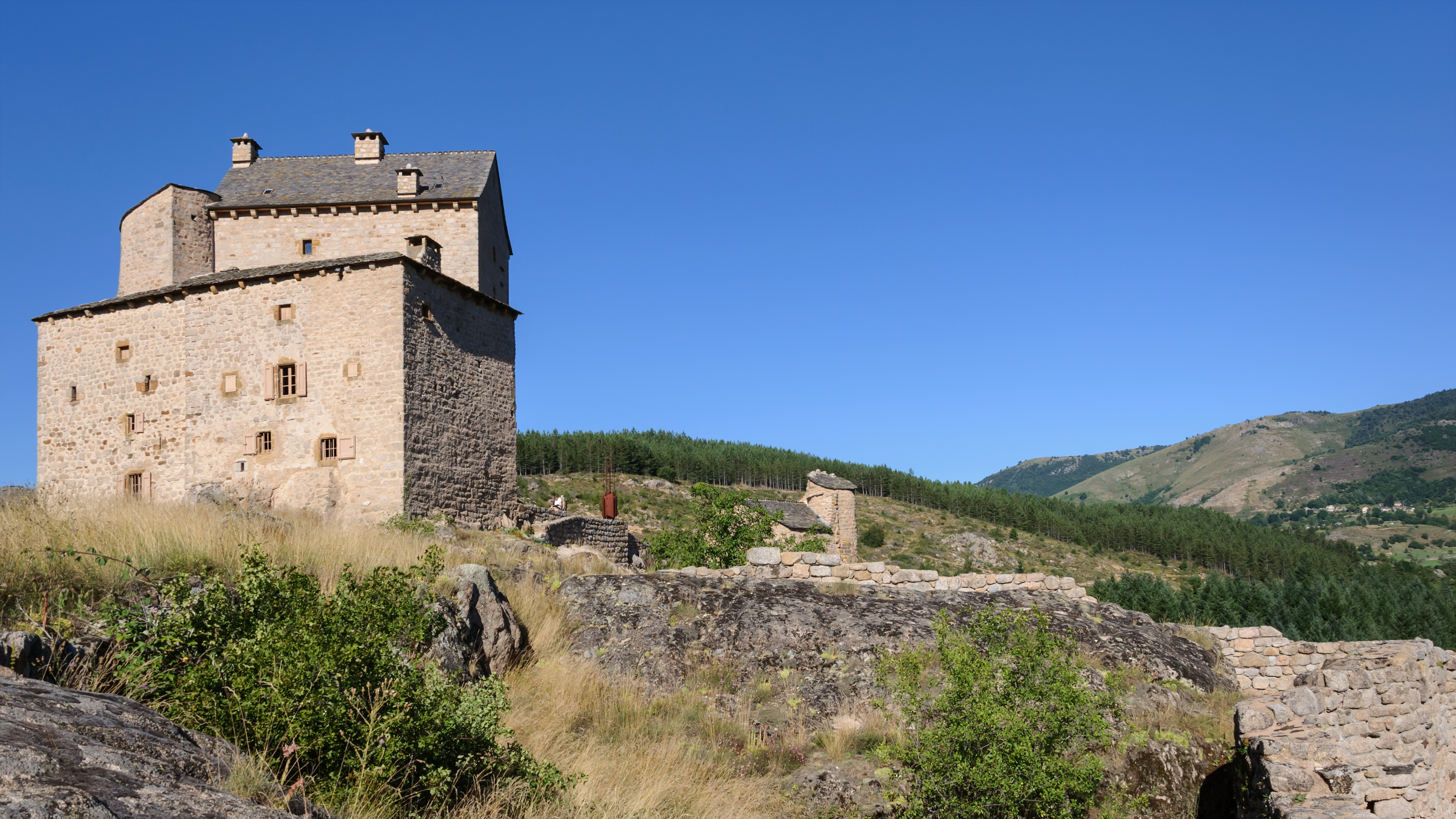
The Château de Miral

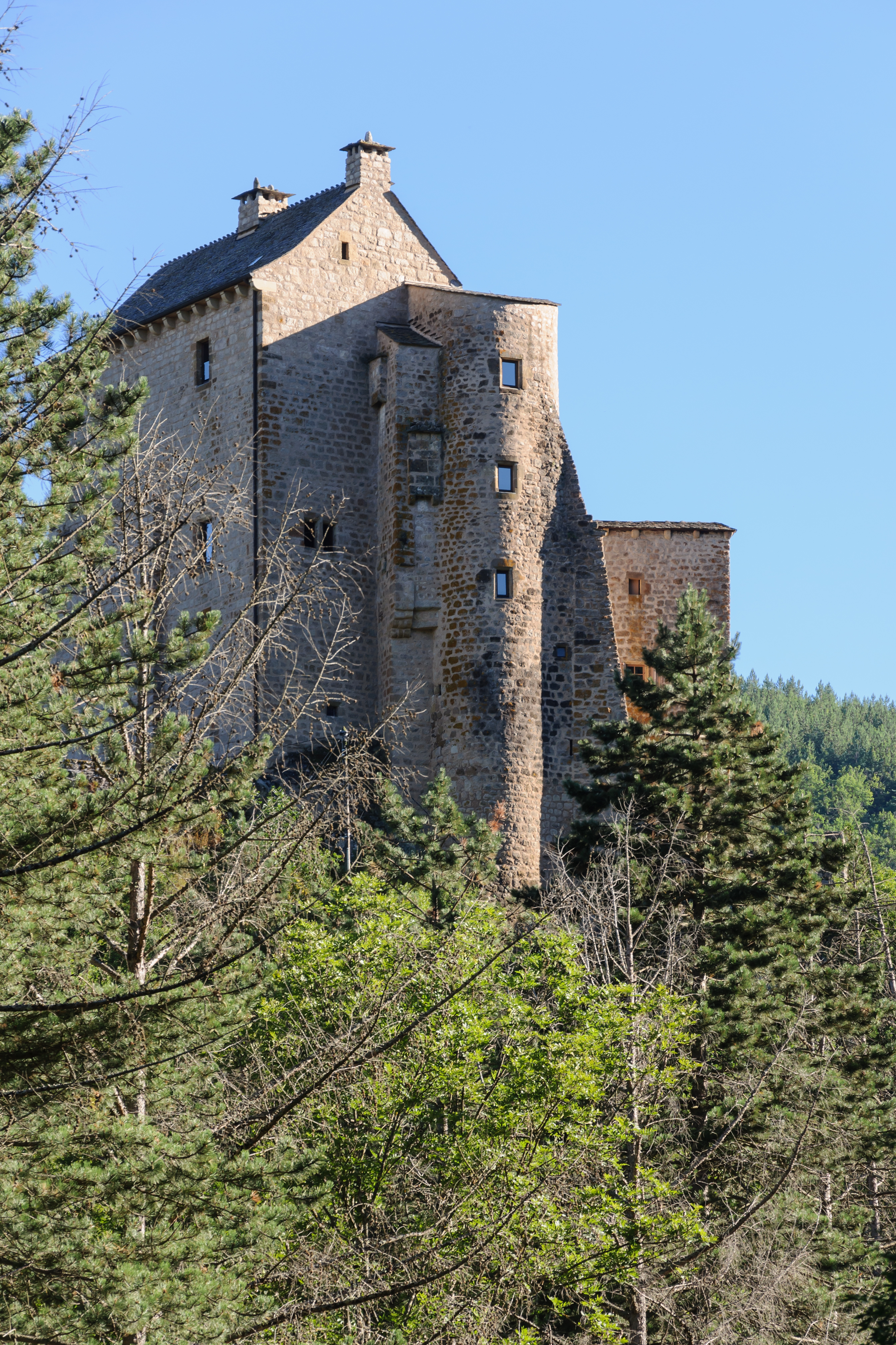
Château de Miral seen from the D998

The Château de Miral (13th century) is a castle in the commune of Bédouès, in the Lozère département, in the Cevennes mountains of south-central France. It is about 10 km east of Florac going towards Le Pont-de-Montvert on road D998. The castle overlooks the confluence of the Rûnes and Tarn rivers.

It belonged in the 13th century to the Cahbrieres family and from the 14th century to the Malbosc family.

Its keep was built towards the end of the 13th century as the seat of the Malbosc-Miral family. Its ramparts defended access to the upper Tarn valley. From the 14th to the 16th centuries, the Lords of Malbosc-Miral constructed their residence and outbuildings around the keep.

At the time of the French Revolution, the last proprietor, Charles, Count of Altier was guillotined with his son in 1794 and the castle was sold for 34,719 livres in 1796. The castle began to decline into ruins. Restoration work on the castle began in 1980.

== Description ==
Built on the edge of a precipice, the castle can only be approached from one side.

Dating from the 13th century, the castle was closely related to the history of the disorders and wars in Gévaudan over five centuries. The fortifications include a massive square keep with a high round tower on one side, an assortment of buildings and defensive works. Mullioned windows in the old seigniorial residence and the interior murals in the vault and the western building date from the Renaissance. The military architecture of 13th and 14th centuries is evident from the use of a natural defensive site with a double enceinte. It was an important local seigniory which exploited nearby silver mines. The castle has carved and painted decorations, one of the few civil buildings in this area to have preserved them.

The castle is privately owned. It has been listed since 1984 as a monument historique by the French Ministry of Culture.

== See also ==
- List of castles in France
