= Saint-Privat-de-Vallongue =

- Commune
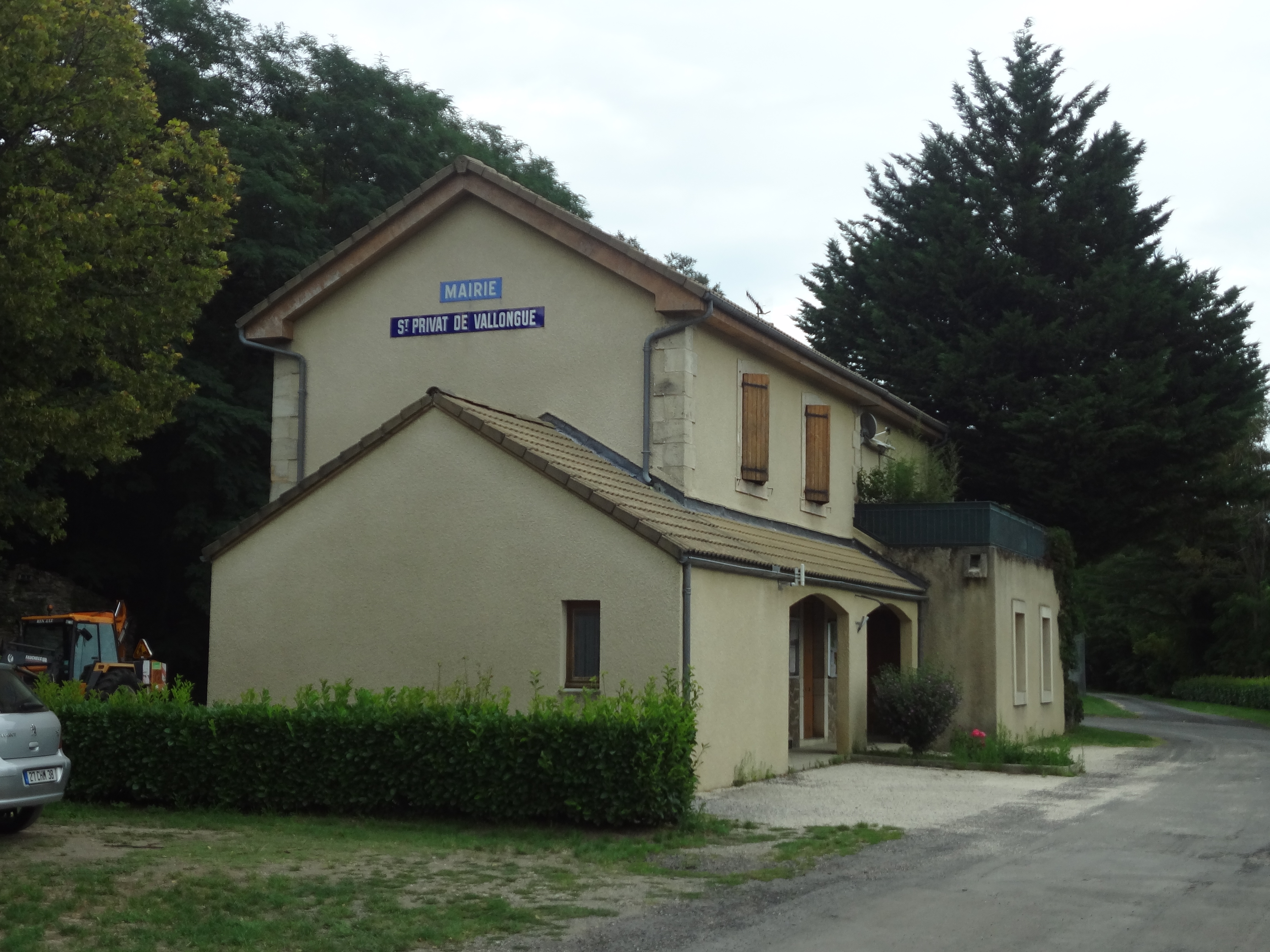
- The town hall of Saint-Privat-de-Vallongue, in the former railway station building
- Location of Saint-Privat-de-Vallongue
- Location within France Location within Occitanie
- Coordinates: 44°16′44″N 3°50′13″E
- Country: France
- Region: Occitania
- Department: Lozère
- Arrondissement: Florac
- Canton: Le Collet-de-Dèze
- Intercommunality: CC des Cévennes au Mont Lozère

Government
  - Mayor (2020–2026): Pascal Marchelidon
- Area^{1}: 23.87 km^{2} (9.22 sq mi)
- Elevation: 608 m (1,995 ft)
- Highest elevation: 1,353 m (4,439 ft)
- Lowest elevation: 354 m (1,161 ft)
- Population (2023): 274
  - Density: 11.5/km^{2} (29.7/sq mi)
- Time zone: UTC+01:00 (CET)
  - Summer (DST): UTC+02:00 (CEST)
- INSEE/Postal code: 48178 /48240
- ^{1} French Land Register data, which excludes lakes, ponds, glaciers > 1 km^{2} (0.386 sq mi or 247 acres) and river estuaries.

Saint-Privat-de-Vallongue (French pronunciation: [sɛ̃ pʁiva də valɔ̃ɡ]; Occitan: Sent Privat de Vallònga) is a commune in the Lozère department in southern France.

== See also ==
- Communes of the Lozère department
