= Le Collet-de-Dèze =

Commune in Occitania, France

- Commune
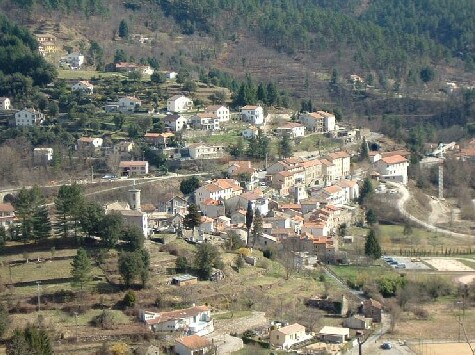
- An overall view of le Collet-de-Dèze
- Location of Le Collet-de-Dèze
- Location within France Location within Occitanie
- Coordinates: 44°14′47″N 3°55′27″E
- Country: France
- Region: Occitania
- Department: Lozère
- Arrondissement: Florac
- Canton: Le Collet-de-Dèze
- Intercommunality: CC des Cévennes au Mont Lozère

Government
  - Mayor (2020–2026): Marc Soustelle
- Area^{1}: 26.47 km^{2} (10.22 sq mi)
- Elevation: 306 m (1,004 ft)
- Highest elevation: 900 m (3,000 ft)
- Lowest elevation: 260 m (850 ft)
- Population (2023): 684
  - Density: 25.8/km^{2} (66.9/sq mi)
- Time zone: UTC+01:00 (CET)
  - Summer (DST): UTC+02:00 (CEST)
- INSEE/Postal code: 48051 /48160
- ^{1} French Land Register data, which excludes lakes, ponds, glaciers > 1 km^{2} (0.386 sq mi or 247 acres) and river estuaries.

Le Collet-de-Dèze (French pronunciation: [lə kɔlɛ də dɛz]; Occitan: Lo Colet de Dèsa) is a commune in the Lozère department in southern France.

== See also ==
- Communes of the Lozère department
