= Saint-Julien-des-Points =

- Commune
- Coat of arms
- Location of Saint-Julien-des-Points
- Location within France Location within Occitanie
- Coordinates: 44°15′22″N 3°57′57″E
- Country: France
- Region: Occitania
- Department: Lozère
- Arrondissement: Florac
- Canton: Le Collet-de-Dèze
- Intercommunality: CC des Cévennes au Mont Lozère

Government
  - Mayor (2020–2026): André Deleuze
- Area^{1}: 3.83 km^{2} (1.48 sq mi)
- Elevation: 380 m (1,250 ft)
- Highest elevation: 725 m (2,379 ft)
- Lowest elevation: 248 m (814 ft)
- Population (2023): 121
  - Density: 31.6/km^{2} (81.8/sq mi)
- Time zone: UTC+01:00 (CET)
  - Summer (DST): UTC+02:00 (CEST)
- INSEE/Postal code: 48163 /48160
- ^{1} French Land Register data, which excludes lakes, ponds, glaciers > 1 km^{2} (0.386 sq mi or 247 acres) and river estuaries.

Saint-Julien-des-Points (French pronunciation: [sɛ̃ ʒyljɛ̃ de pwɛ̃]; Occitan: Sent Julien dels Punts) is a commune in the Lozère department in southern France.

== See also ==
- Communes of the Lozère department
