= Saint-Martin-de-Boubaux =

- Commune
- Location of Saint-Martin-de-Boubaux
- Location within France Location within Occitanie
- Coordinates: 44°12′03″N 3°55′23″E
- Country: France
- Region: Occitania
- Department: Lozère
- Arrondissement: Florac
- Canton: Le Collet-de-Dèze
- Intercommunality: CC des Cévennes au Mont Lozère

Government
  - Mayor (2020–2026): Alain Louche
- Area^{1}: 31.41 km^{2} (12.13 sq mi)
- Elevation: 400 m (1,300 ft)
- Highest elevation: 925 m (3,035 ft)
- Lowest elevation: 200 m (660 ft)
- Population (2023): 196
  - Density: 6.24/km^{2} (16.2/sq mi)
- Time zone: UTC+01:00 (CET)
  - Summer (DST): UTC+02:00 (CEST)
- INSEE/Postal code: 48170 /48160
- ^{1} French Land Register data, which excludes lakes, ponds, glaciers > 1 km^{2} (0.386 sq mi or 247 acres) and river estuaries.

Saint-Martin-de-Boubaux (French pronunciation: [sɛ̃ maʁtɛ̃ də bubo]; Occitan: Sent Martin de Bovaus) is a commune in the Lozère department in southern France.

== See also ==
- Communes of the Lozère department
