= Sainte-Croix-Vallée-Française =

- Commune
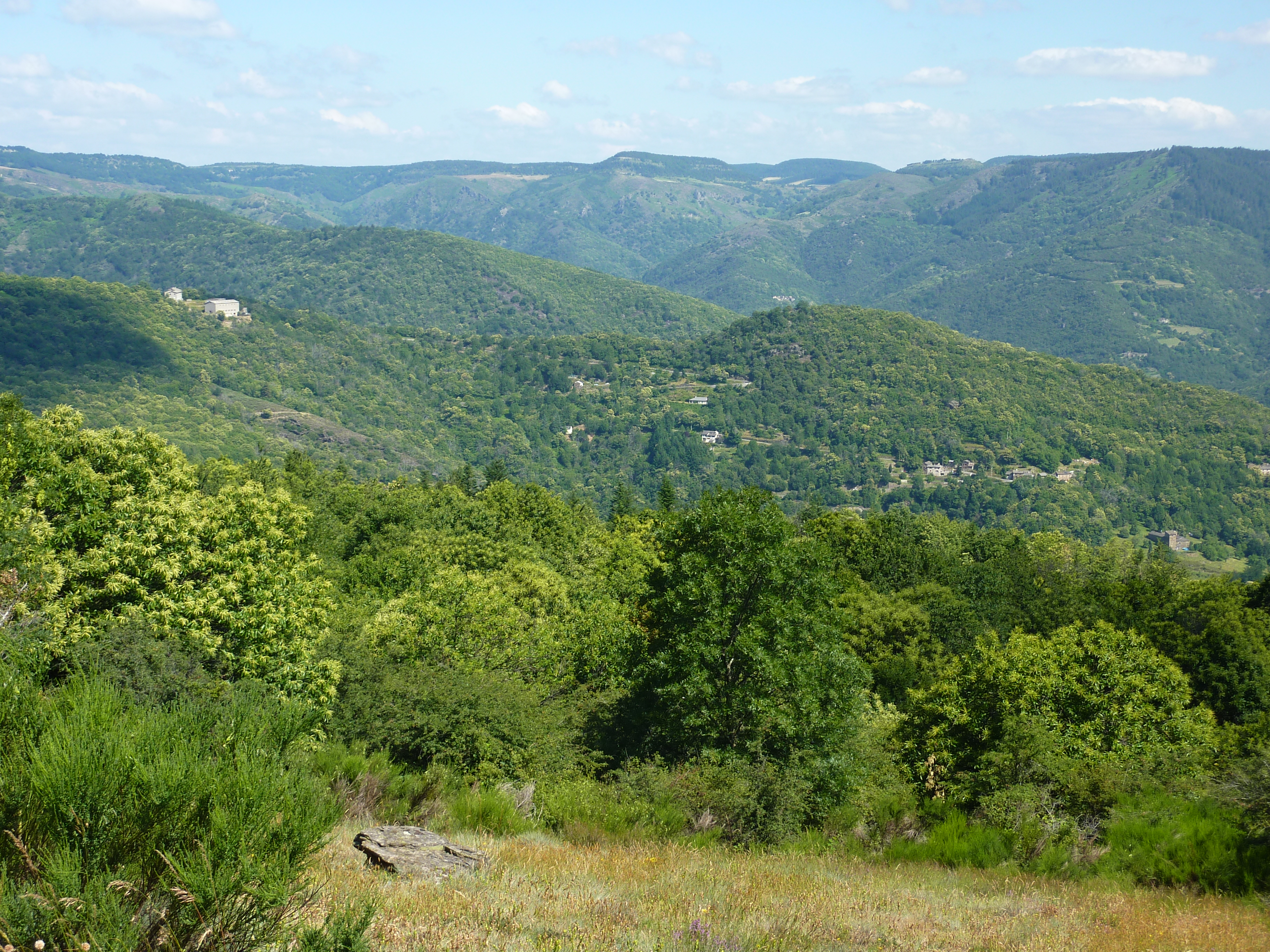
- A view of the Vallée française between Saint-Jean-du-Gard and Florac
- Location of Sainte-Croix-Vallée-Française
- Location within France Location within Occitanie
- Coordinates: 44°10′51″N 3°44′35″E
- Country: France
- Region: Occitania
- Department: Lozère
- Arrondissement: Florac
- Canton: Le Collet-de-Dèze
- Intercommunality: CC des Cévennes au Mont Lozère

Government
  - Mayor (2020–2026): Jean Hannart
- Area^{1}: 18.57 km^{2} (7.17 sq mi)
- Elevation: 350 m (1,150 ft)
- Highest elevation: 924 m (3,031 ft)
- Lowest elevation: 320 m (1,050 ft)
- Population (2023): 303
  - Density: 16.3/km^{2} (42.3/sq mi)
- Time zone: UTC+01:00 (CET)
  - Summer (DST): UTC+02:00 (CEST)
- INSEE/Postal code: 48144 /48110
- ^{1} French Land Register data, which excludes lakes, ponds, glaciers > 1 km^{2} (0.386 sq mi or 247 acres) and river estuaries.

Sainte-Croix-Vallée-Française (French pronunciation: [sɛ̃t kʁwa də vale fʁɑ̃sɛːz]; Occitan: Senta Crotz de Valfrancesca) is a commune in the Lozère department in southern France.

== See also ==
- Communes of the Lozère department
