= Saint-Martin-de-Lansuscle =

- Commune
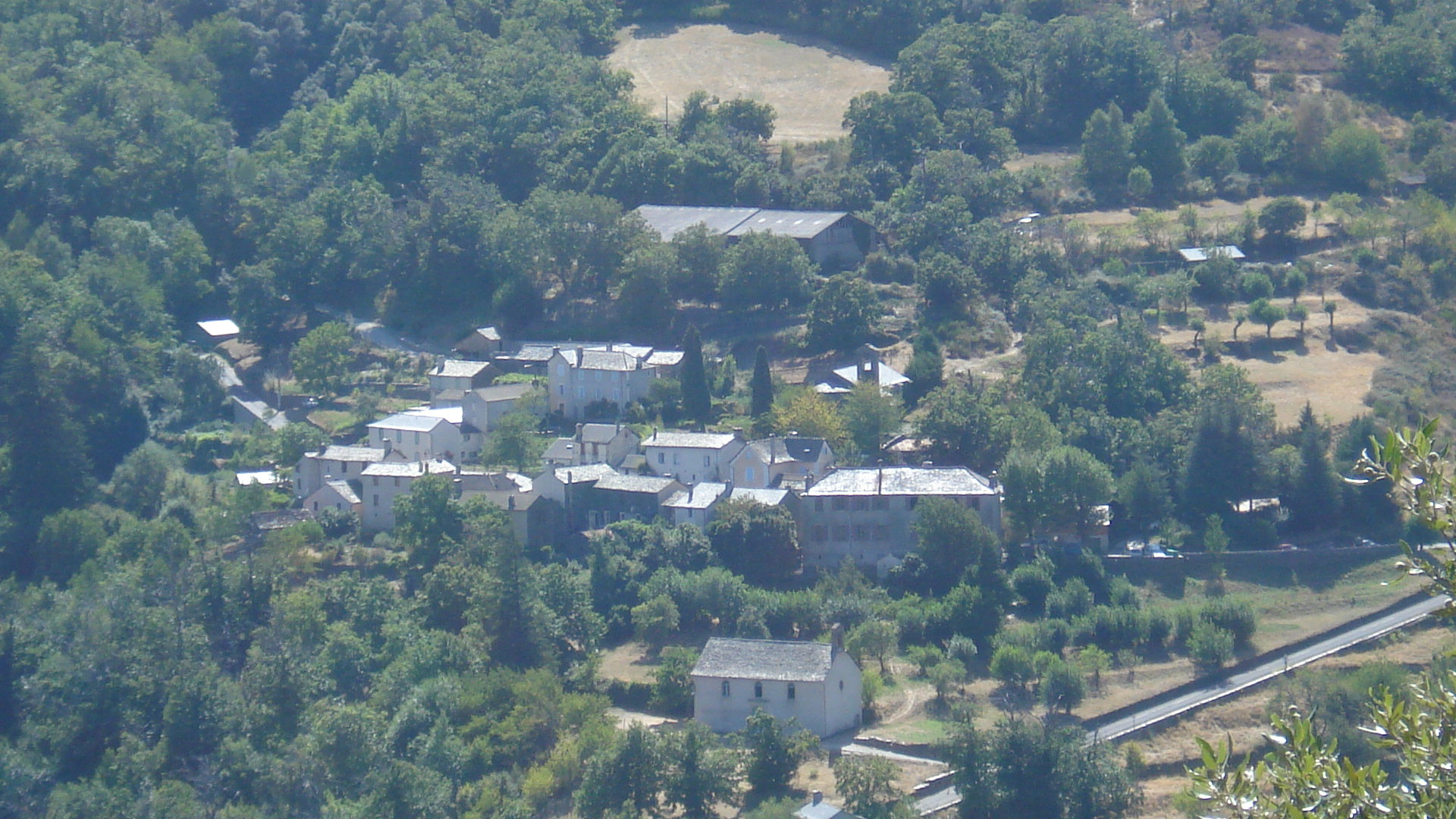
- An overview of Saint-Martin-de-Lansuscle from the Col de Malhaussette
- Location of Saint-Martin-de-Lansuscle
- Location within France Location within Occitanie
- Coordinates: 44°13′01″N 3°45′14″E
- Country: France
- Region: Occitania
- Department: Lozère
- Arrondissement: Florac
- Canton: Le Collet-de-Dèze
- Intercommunality: CC des Cévennes au Mont Lozère

Government
  - Mayor (2020–2026): Pierre Plagnes
- Area^{1}: 18.05 km^{2} (6.97 sq mi)
- Elevation: 600 m (2,000 ft)
- Highest elevation: 1,147 m (3,763 ft)
- Lowest elevation: 376 m (1,234 ft)
- Population (2023): 191
  - Density: 10.6/km^{2} (27.4/sq mi)
- Time zone: UTC+01:00 (CET)
  - Summer (DST): UTC+02:00 (CEST)
- INSEE/Postal code: 48171 /48110
- ^{1} French Land Register data, which excludes lakes, ponds, glaciers > 1 km^{2} (0.386 sq mi or 247 acres) and river estuaries.

Saint-Martin-de-Lansuscle (French pronunciation: [sɛ̃ maʁtɛ̃ də lɑ̃syskl]; Occitan: Sent Martin de Lansuscla) is a commune in the Lozère department in southern France.

== See also ==
- Communes of the Lozère department
