= Fraissinet-de-Fourques =

- Commune
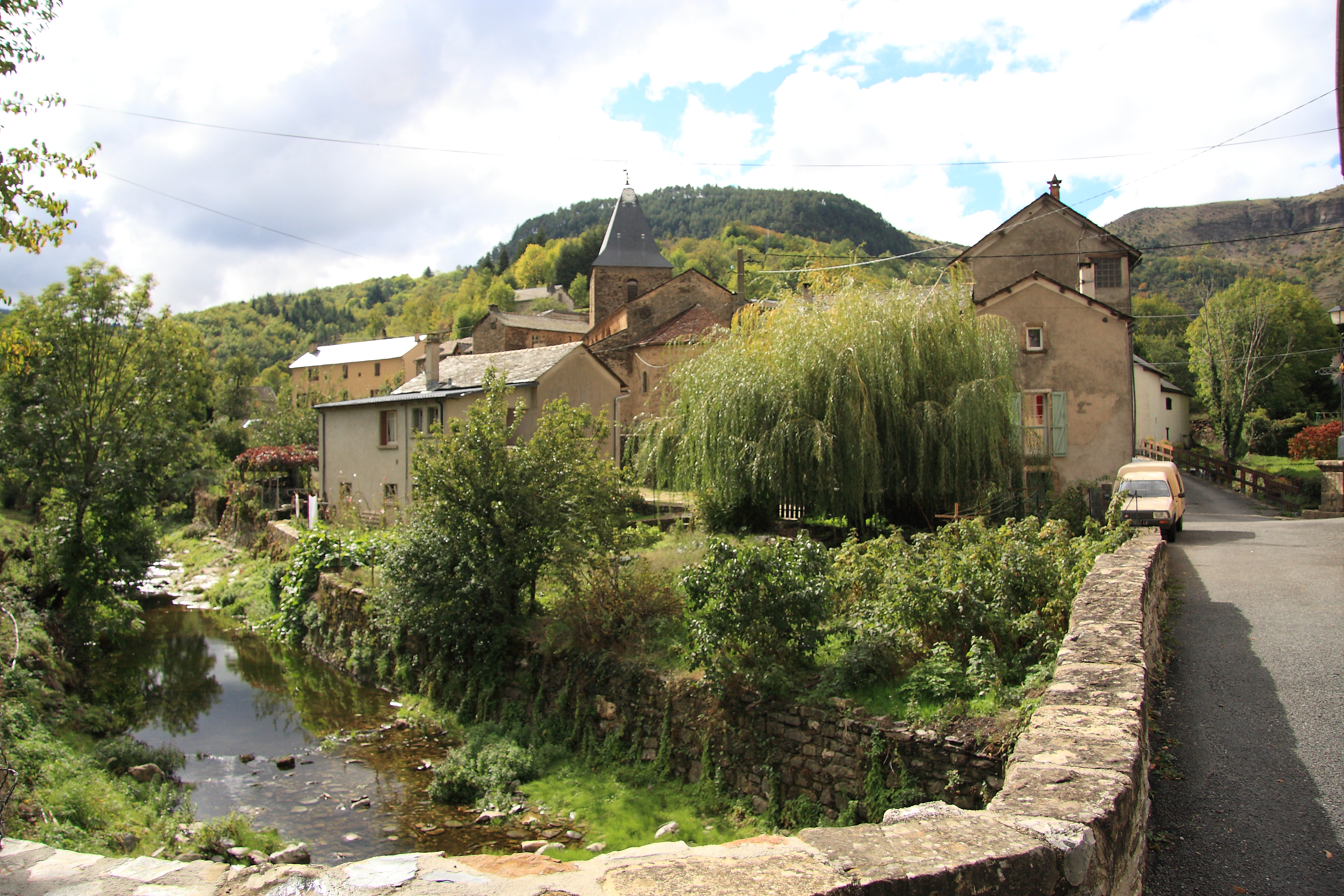
- A view from the bridge over the river in Fraissinet-de-Fourques
- Location of Fraissinet-de-Fourques
- Location within France Location within Occitanie
- Coordinates: 44°12′58″N 3°32′23″E
- Country: France
- Region: Occitania
- Department: Lozère
- Arrondissement: Florac
- Canton: Le Collet-de-Dèze
- Intercommunality: CC Gorges Causses Cévennes

Government
  - Mayor (2020–2026): Daniel Reboul
- Area^{1}: 24.30 km^{2} (9.38 sq mi)
- Elevation: 740 m (2,430 ft)
- Highest elevation: 1,343 m (4,406 ft)
- Lowest elevation: 660 m (2,170 ft)
- Population (2023): 83
  - Density: 3.4/km^{2} (8.8/sq mi)
- Time zone: UTC+01:00 (CET)
  - Summer (DST): UTC+02:00 (CEST)
- INSEE/Postal code: 48065 /48400
- ^{1} French Land Register data, which excludes lakes, ponds, glaciers > 1 km^{2} (0.386 sq mi or 247 acres) and river estuaries.

Fraissinet-de-Fourques (French pronunciation: [fʁɛsinɛ də fuʁk]; Occitan: Fraissinet de Forcas) is a commune in the Lozère department in southern France.

== See also ==
- Communes of the Lozère department
- Causse Méjean
