= Vebron =

- Commune
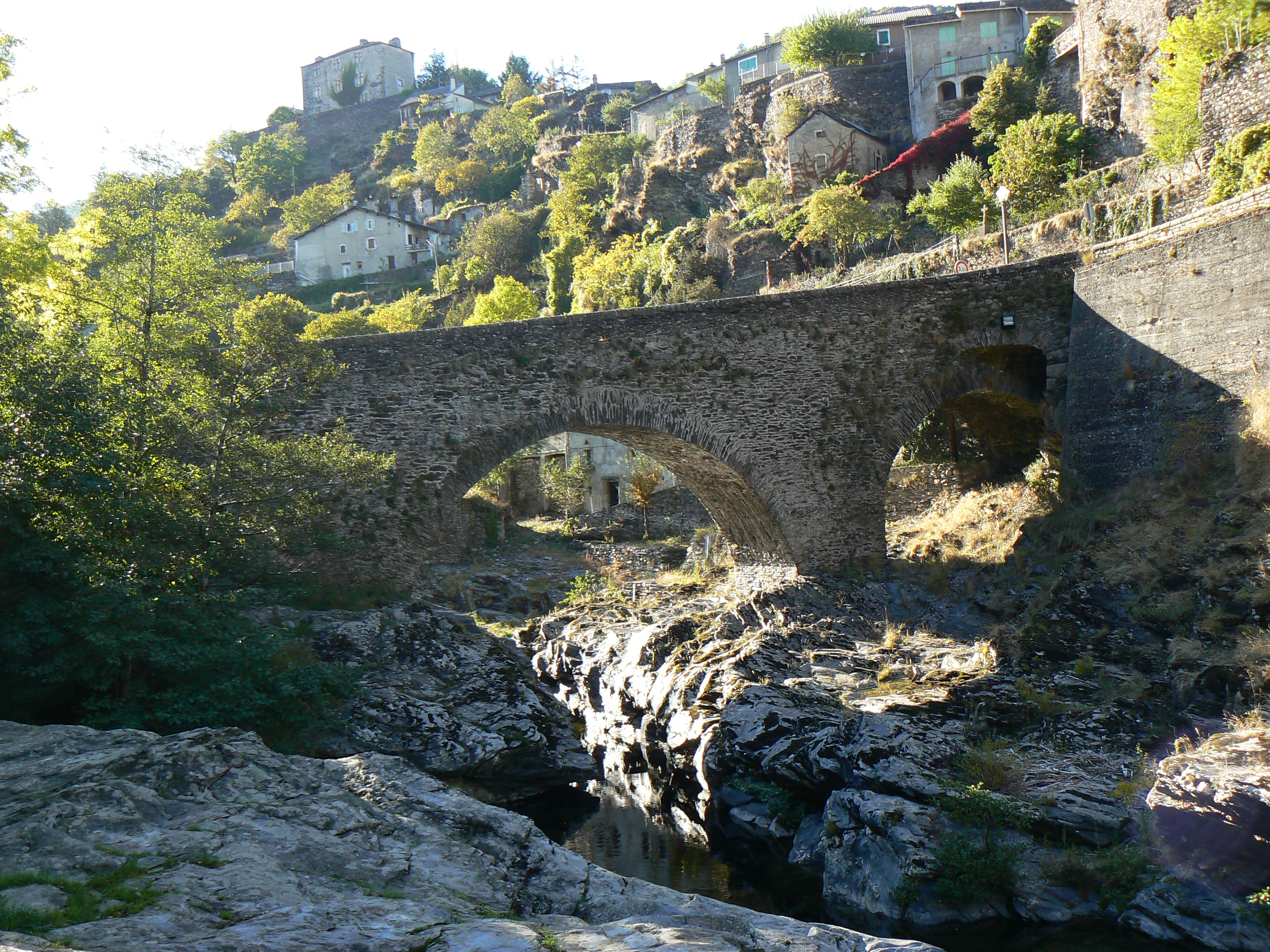
- The Vebron bridge, on the bank of the River Tarnon

- Coat of arms
- Location of Vebron
- Location within France Location within Occitanie
- Coordinates: 44°14′24″N 3°34′43″E
- Country: France
- Region: Occitania
- Department: Lozère
- Arrondissement: Florac
- Canton: Le Collet-de-Dèze
- Intercommunality: CC Gorges Causses Cévennes

Government
  - Mayor (2020–2026): Alain Argilier
- Area^{1}: 69.66 km^{2} (26.90 sq mi)
- Elevation: 661 m (2,169 ft)
- Highest elevation: 1,246 m (4,088 ft)
- Lowest elevation: 611 m (2,005 ft)
- Population (2023): 225
  - Density: 3.23/km^{2} (8.37/sq mi)
- Time zone: UTC+01:00 (CET)
  - Summer (DST): UTC+02:00 (CEST)
- INSEE/Postal code: 48193 /48400
- ^{1} French Land Register data, which excludes lakes, ponds, glaciers > 1 km^{2} (0.386 sq mi or 247 acres) and river estuaries.

Vebron is a commune in the Lozère department in southern France.

== See also ==
- Communes of the Lozère department
- Causse Méjean
