= Gabriac, Lozère =

Gabriac
- Commune
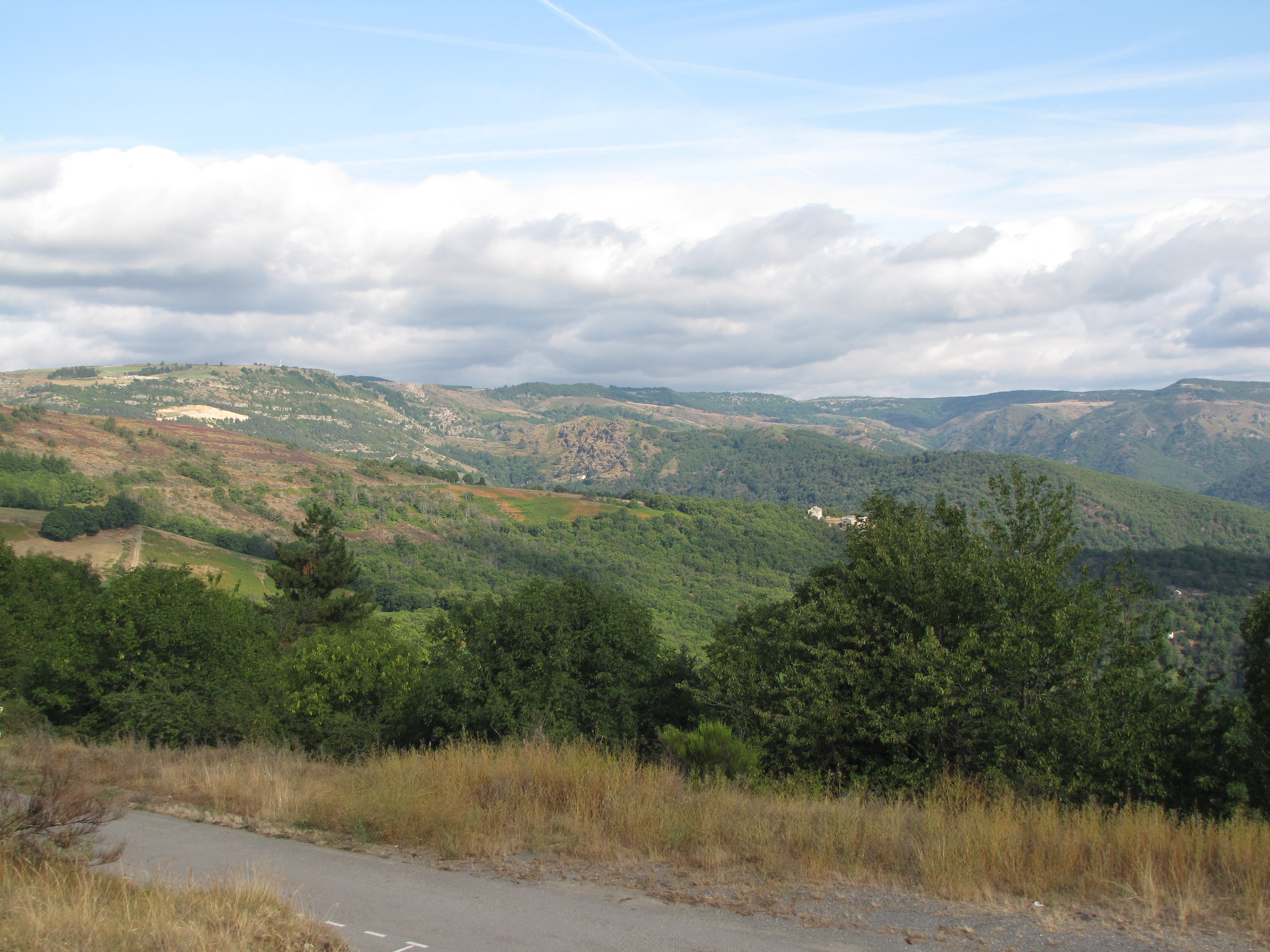
- Location of Gabriac
- Location within France Location within Occitanie
- Coordinates: 44°10′43″N 3°43′27″E
- Country: France
- Region: Occitania
- Department: Lozère
- Arrondissement: Florac
- Canton: Le Collet-de-Dèze
- Intercommunality: Cévennes au Mont Lozère

Government
  - Mayor (2020–2026): Jean-Max André
- Area^{1}: 8.44 km^{2} (3.26 sq mi)
- Elevation: 489 m (1,604 ft)
- Highest elevation: 864 m (2,835 ft)
- Lowest elevation: 353 m (1,158 ft)
- Population (2023): 102
  - Density: 12.1/km^{2} (31.3/sq mi)
- Time zone: UTC+01:00 (CET)
  - Summer (DST): UTC+02:00 (CEST)
- INSEE/Postal code: 48067 /48110
- ^{1} French Land Register data, which excludes lakes, ponds, glaciers > 1 km^{2} (0.386 sq mi or 247 acres) and river estuaries.

Gabriac (French pronunciation: [ɡabʁijak]) is a commune in the Lozère department in southern France.

== Population ==
Historical population
Year	Pop.	±% p.a.
1968	107	—
1975	102	−0.68%
1982	107	+0.69%
1990	102	−0.60%
1999	97	−0.56%
2007	107	+1.23%
2012	109	+0.37%
2017	100	−1.71%
2023	102	+0.33%
Source: INSEE

== See also ==
- Communes of the Lozère department
