= Canton of Le Collet-de-Dèze =

Coordinates: 44.25°N 3.92°E

The canton of Le Collet-de-Dèze is an administrative division of the Lozère department, southern France. It was created at the French canton reorganisation which came into effect in March 2015. Its seat is in Le Collet-de-Dèze.

It consists of the following communes:

1. Barre-des-Cévennes
2. Bassurels
3. Cans-et-Cévennes
4. Cassagnas
5. Le Collet-de-Dèze
6. Fraissinet-de-Fourques
7. Gabriac
8. Moissac-Vallée-Française
9. Molezon
10. Le Pompidou
11. Rousses
12. Saint-André-de-Lancize
13. Sainte-Croix-Vallée-Française
14. Saint-Étienne-Vallée-Française
15. Saint-Germain-de-Calberte
16. Saint-Hilaire-de-Lavit
17. Saint-Julien-des-Points
18. Saint-Martin-de-Boubaux
19. Saint-Martin-de-Lansuscle
20. Saint-Michel-de-Dèze
21. Saint-Privat-de-Vallongue
22. Vebron
23. Ventalon-en-Cévennes
