= Arrondissement of Florac =

Coordinates: 44°19′29″N 3°35′34″E

Florac
- Arrondissement
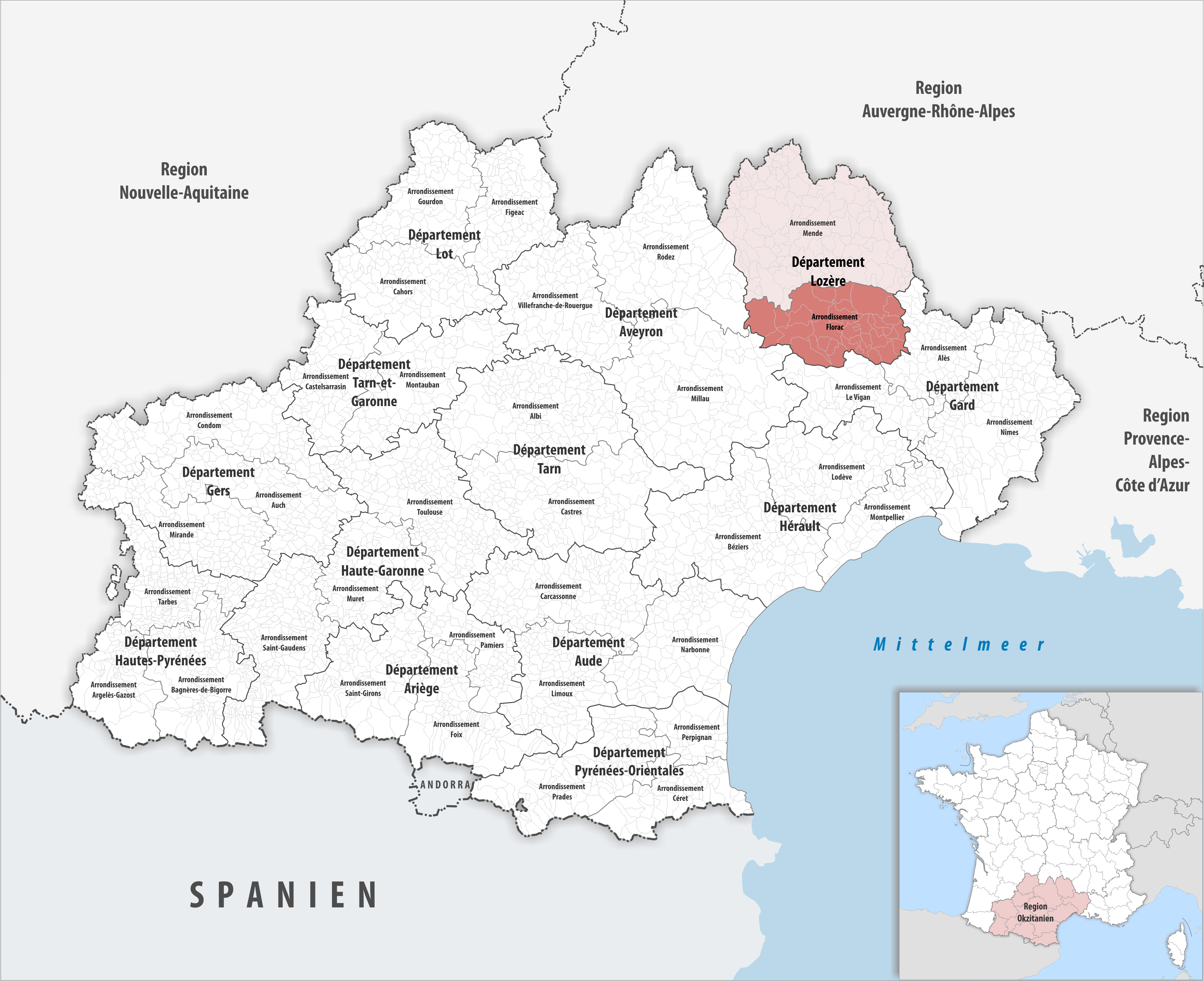
- Location within the region Occitanie
- Country: France
- Region: Occitania
- Department: Lozère
- No. of communes: {{{nbcomm}}}
- Area: 1,687.5 km^{2} (651.5 sq mi)
- Population (2023): 13,088
  - Density: 7.7559/km^{2} (20.088/sq mi)
- INSEE code: 481

The arrondissement of Florac is an arrondissement of France in the Lozère department in the Occitanie région. Its INSEE code is 481 and its capital city is Florac-Trois-Rivières. Its population is 13,028 (2021), and its area is 1,687.5 km^{2} (651.5 sq mi).

It is the smallest and southernmost of the two arrondissements of the department. There is only one town with more than 1,000 inhabitants: Florac Trois Rivières, with 2,067 inhabitants.

== Geography ==
The arrondissement of Florac is surrounded by the arrondissement of Mende to the north, by the Gard department to the east and south, and by the Aveyron department to the west.

== Composition ==
The arrondissement of Florac has 38 communes; they are (with their INSEE codes):

1. Barre-des-Cévennes (48019)
2. Bassurels (48020)
3. Bédouès-Cocurès (48050)
4. Les Bondons (48028)
5. Cans-et-Cévennes (48166)
6. Cassagnas (48036)
7. Le Collet-de-Dèze (48051)
8. Florac Trois Rivières (48061)
9. Fraissinet-de-Fourques (48065)
10. Gabriac (48067)
11. Gatuzières (48069)
12. Gorges du Tarn Causses (48146)
13. Hures-la-Parade (48074)
14. Ispagnac (48075)
15. La Malène (48088)
16. Mas-Saint-Chély (48141)
17. Massegros Causses Gorges (48094)
18. Meyrueis (48096)
19. Moissac-Vallée-Française (48097)
20. Molezon (48098)
21. Le Pompidou (48115)
22. Pont-de-Montvert-Sud-Mont-Lozère (48116)
23. Rousses (48130)
24. Le Rozier (48131)
25. Saint-André-de-Lancize (48136)
26. Sainte-Croix-Vallée-Française (48144)
27. Saint-Étienne-Vallée-Française (48148)
28. Saint-Germain-de-Calberte (48155)
29. Saint-Hilaire-de-Lavit (48158)
30. Saint-Julien-des-Points (48163)
31. Saint-Martin-de-Boubaux (48170)
32. Saint-Martin-de-Lansuscle (48171)
33. Saint-Michel-de-Dèze (48173)
34. Saint-Pierre-des-Tripiers (48176)
35. Saint-Privat-de-Vallongue (48178)
36. Vebron (48193)
37. Ventalon-en-Cévennes (48152)
38. Vialas (48194)

== History ==
The arrondissement of Florac was created in 1800.

As a result of the reorganisation of the cantons of France which came into effect in 2015, the borders of the cantons are no longer related to the borders of the arrondissements. The cantons of the arrondissement of Florac were, as of January 2015:

1. Barre-des-Cévennes
2. Florac
3. Le Massegros
4. Meyrueis
5. Le Pont-de-Montvert
6. Sainte-Enimie
7. Saint-Germain-de-Calberte
