= Mende, Lozère =

Mende
- Prefecture and commune
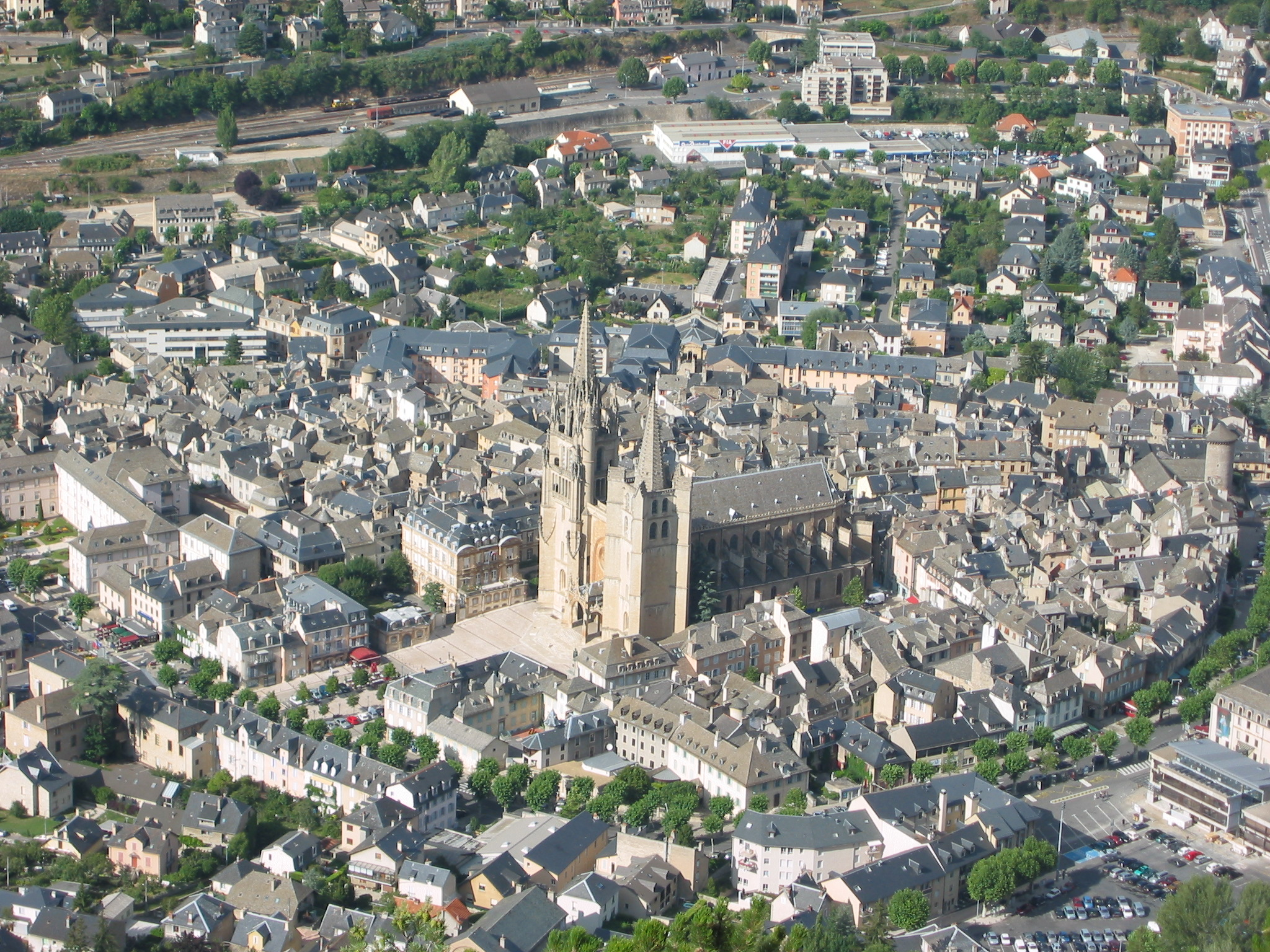
- A general view of the cathedral and surrounding buildings

- Coat of arms
- Location of Mende
- Location within France Location within Occitanie
- Coordinates: 44°31′10″N 3°30′05″E
- Country: France
- Region: Occitania
- Department: Lozère
- Arrondissement: Mende
- Canton: Mende-1 and 2
- Intercommunality: Cœur de Lozère

Government
  - Mayor (2024–2026): Régine Bourgade (MoDem)
- Area^{1}: 36.56 km^{2} (14.12 sq mi)
- Elevation: 732 m (2,402 ft)
- Highest elevation: 1,236 m (4,055 ft)
- Lowest elevation: 691 m (2,267 ft)
- Population (2023): 12,464
  - Density: 340.9/km^{2} (883.0/sq mi)
- Time zone: UTC+01:00 (CET)
  - Summer (DST): UTC+02:00 (CEST)
- INSEE/Postal code: 48095 /48000
- ^{1} French Land Register data, which excludes lakes, ponds, glaciers > 1 km^{2} (0.386 sq mi or 247 acres) and river estuaries.

Mende (French pronunciation: [mɑ̃d], Occitan pronunciation: [ˈmende]) is a commune and the prefecture of the department of Lozère, in the region of Occitania, Southern France. Its inhabitants are called the Mendois. The city, including the first traces of dwellings date back to 200 BC, was originally named Mimata, probably in reference to the mountains that surround it.

Mende is located between Clermont-Ferrand and Montpellier, but also on the axis of Lyon–Saint-Étienne–Albi–Toulouse. The other important nearby towns are Aurillac and Saint-Flour (Cantal), Le Puy-en-Velay (Haute-Loire), Rodez, Millau (Aveyron) and Alès and Nîmes (Gard).

Even though Mende remains a relatively sparsely populated city (approximately 12,000 inhabitants), it remains the most important of the Lozère Department. In addition, it is the city-centre of the only urban area of this department.

It is the seat of the Roman Catholic Diocese of Mende.

== Geography ==
=== Situation ===
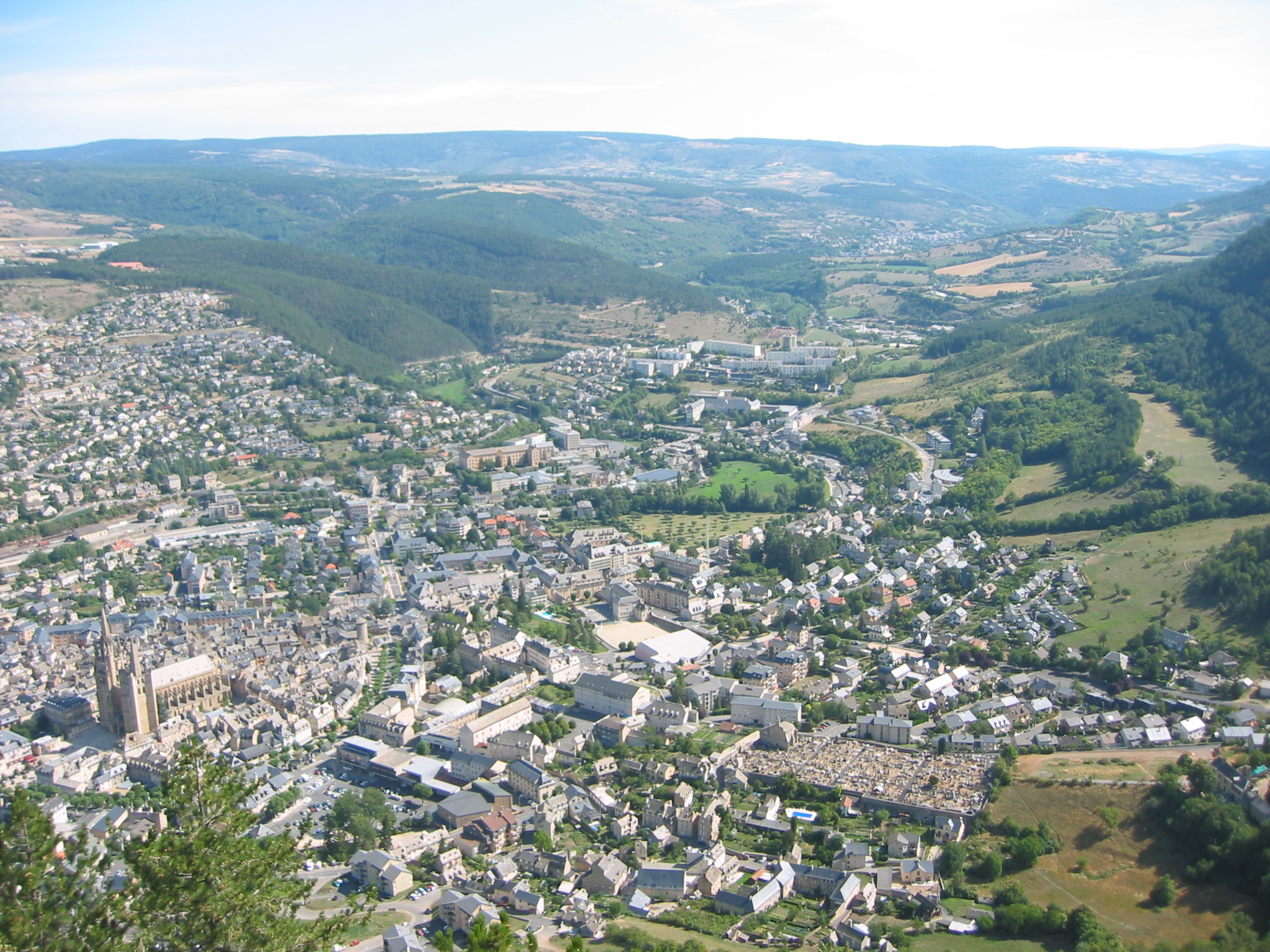
Due east, with the N88, towards Badaroux and Langogne

Mende is situated in the high valley of the Lot, in a mountainous area, in the Pays du Gévaudan, the Rieucros stream joins to it on its right bank. The city is overlooked (on the left bank of the Lot) by Mont Mimat and its black pine forest. Access is by the Côte de la Croix Neuve. On the right bank, residential areas extend over different causses, including the Causse d'Auge. Located on the axis of Lyon-Toulouse, the city has long been a commercial crossroads between the Auvergne, Rhone and the Languedoc.

The commune is bordered by Chastel-Nouvel to the north, Badaroux to the east, Lanuéjols to the southeast, Brenoux and Saint-Bauzile to the south, Balsièges to the southwest, and Barjac and Servières to the west.

Mende is one of the "gateway cities" (along with Millau, Lodève, Alès and Ganges) for the site of the Causses and Cévennes, of world heritage by UNESCO under the inscription "Les Causses and Cevennes, Mediterranean agro-pastoral cultural landscape".

According to the INSEE, Mende is an urban commune without suburbs (ville isolée [isolated town]). It lies at the centre of a functional urban area composed of 31 communes, the only one in the department of Lozère.

=== The Causses ===
The area of the Causses in Lozère

The town of Mende is built in the Lot Valley, within the area of the Grands Causses. The region of the Causses in Lozère is one of the four natural regions of Lozère, with the Margeride, the Aubrac and the Cévennes. The city is nestled in the middle of different Causses which form as natural barriers. However, over the 20th century, urbanisation began to extend beyond these limits.

Of the Causses, Mont Mimat is the most significant. The causse is overhung by the Cross of Saint Privat. A first wooden cross was planted in 1900 or 1907. It was replaced a few years later, on 8 July 1933, a Jubilee year, by a 12.5-metre (41 ft)-high iron cross. Until 1945, this cross was the place of large gatherings in honour of Mendois soldiers. This cross has been illuminated since the summer of 1965. The mount also houses the chapel where Privat, the martyr of the Gévaudan, withdrew to. At its foot lies the area of Vabre where can be found the first remains of houses in the city. Opposite this is the Causse d'Auge (northeast) and the Causse du Crouzet (northwest), and the Margeride mountains beyond. To the west is Causse de Changefège, located between Mende and Barjac, which complements the borders of the city.

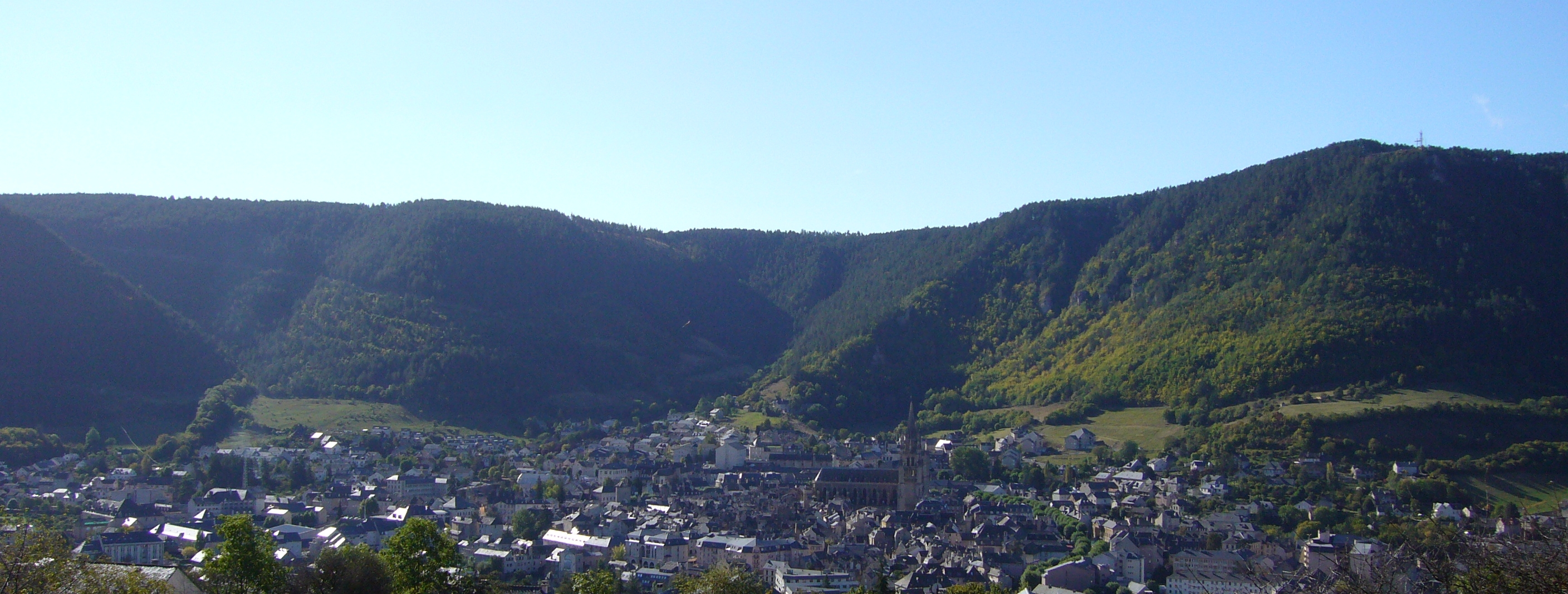
Mende at the foot of Mont Mimat, view of the Causse d'Auge

=== Geology ===
The geology of the city of Mende is very dependent on the surrounding causses and streams that pass through them. The Mont Mimat and the Causse de Changefège are composed of limestone of the "Grands Causses", thus presenting abrupt edges. The other causses (as well as the butte de Fontanille) are composed of limestone of the "Petits Causses" (without these edges). The Lot Valley is composed of marl. The Valdonnez Valley, in the south of Mende, is full of blue marl, leaving one to presuppose that the marl of the town of Mende would be, in part, of the same origin. Finally, the various streams (the Rieucros) of the causses of the north of the city are lined by mica-schist.

=== Hydrology ===
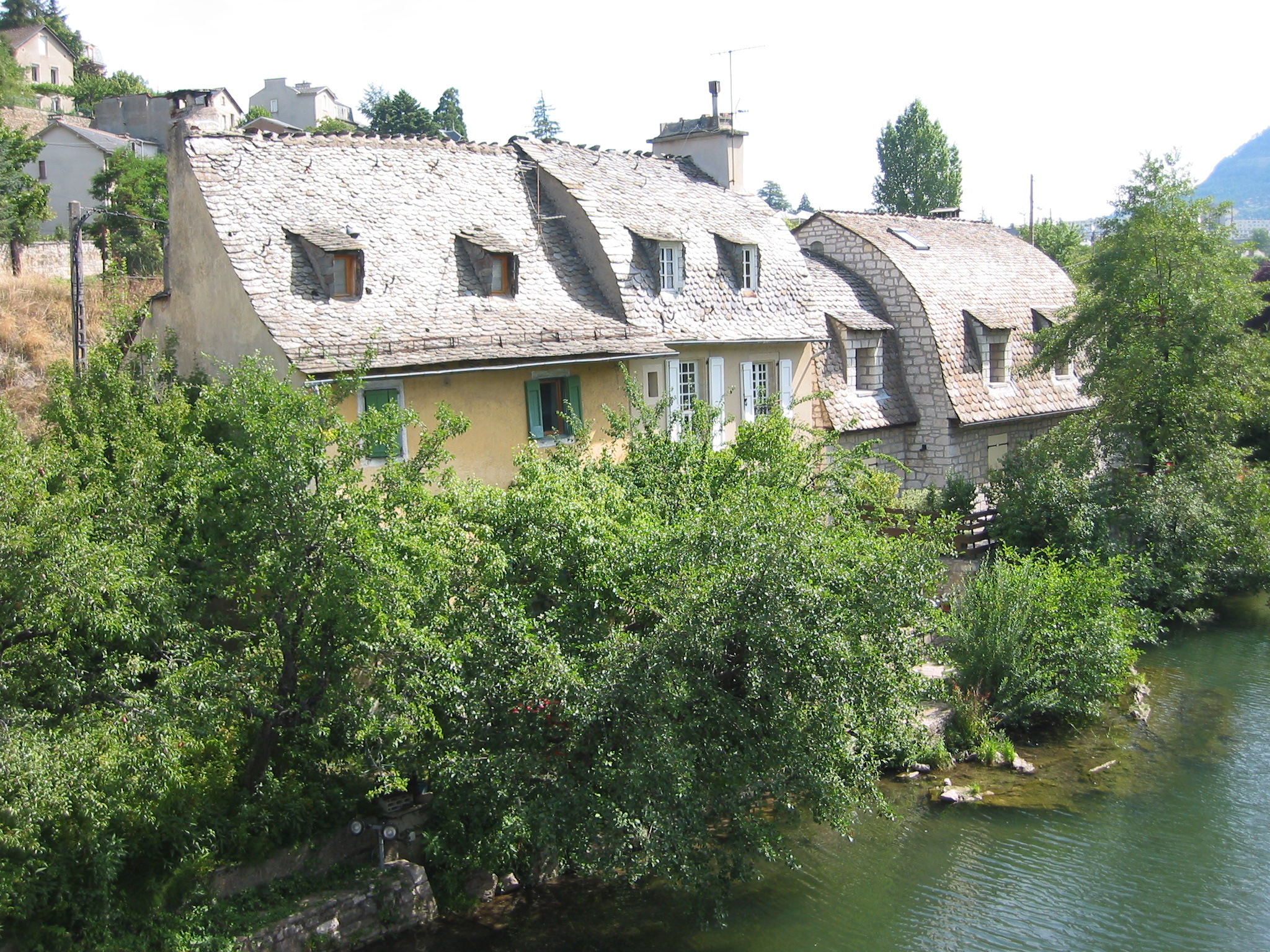
A house alongside the Lot river

The city of Mende was built on the banks of the Lot. But the Lot is not the only presence of water in the city: Indeed, it has several sources (springs), including those of Mont Mimat. The most significant of them is located in the Vabre district, close to the first houses. These sources have also often been channeled and feed the underground water system of the city, visible on the surface through numerous fountains and the old wash house. The streets, such as the Rue du Torrent, attest to the passage of water from Mont Mimat.

To the north, on the other side of the Lot, the sources are much more distant, but water is present in the stream known as Rieucros.

=== Climate ===
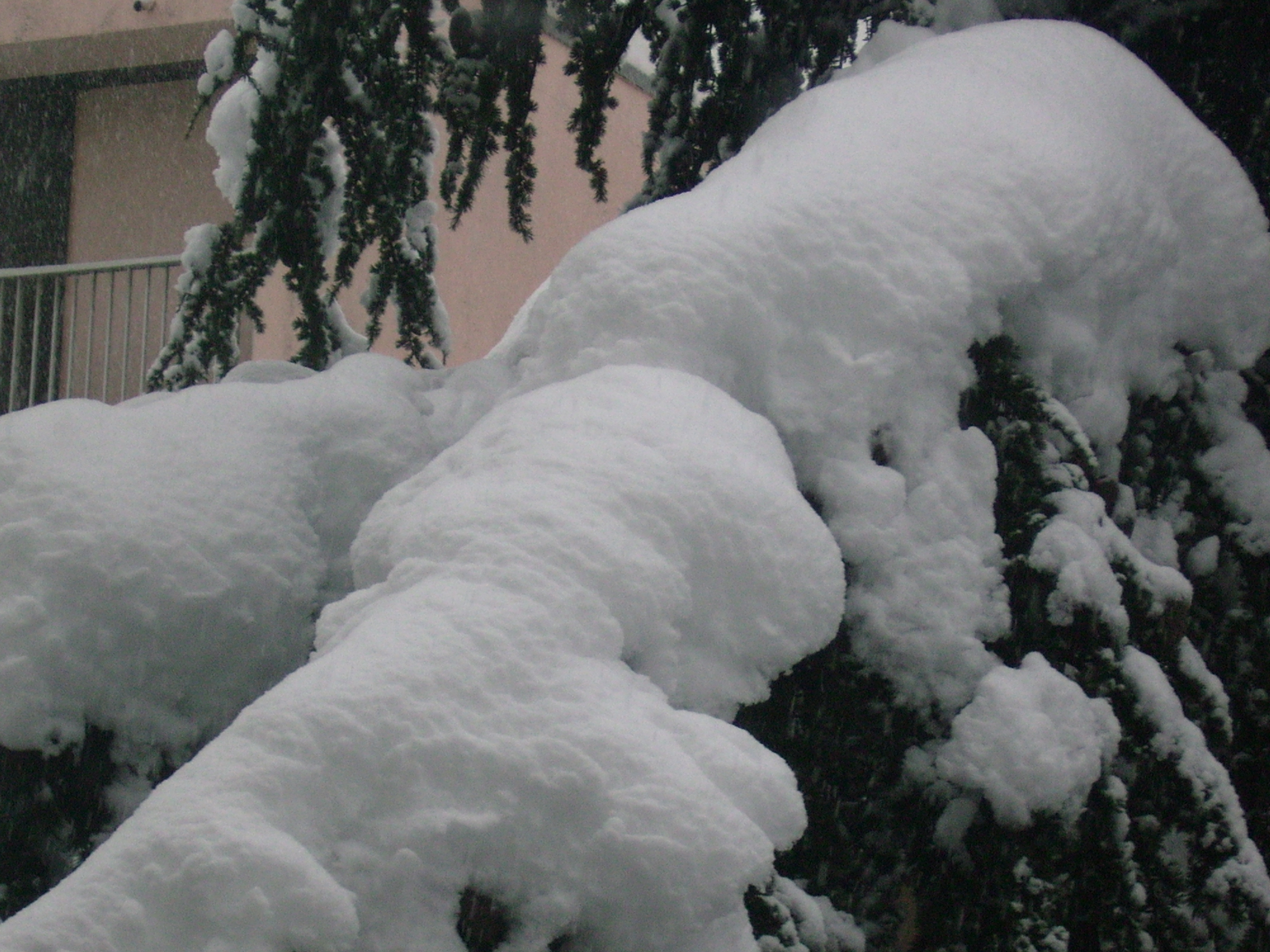
Mende in December 2008

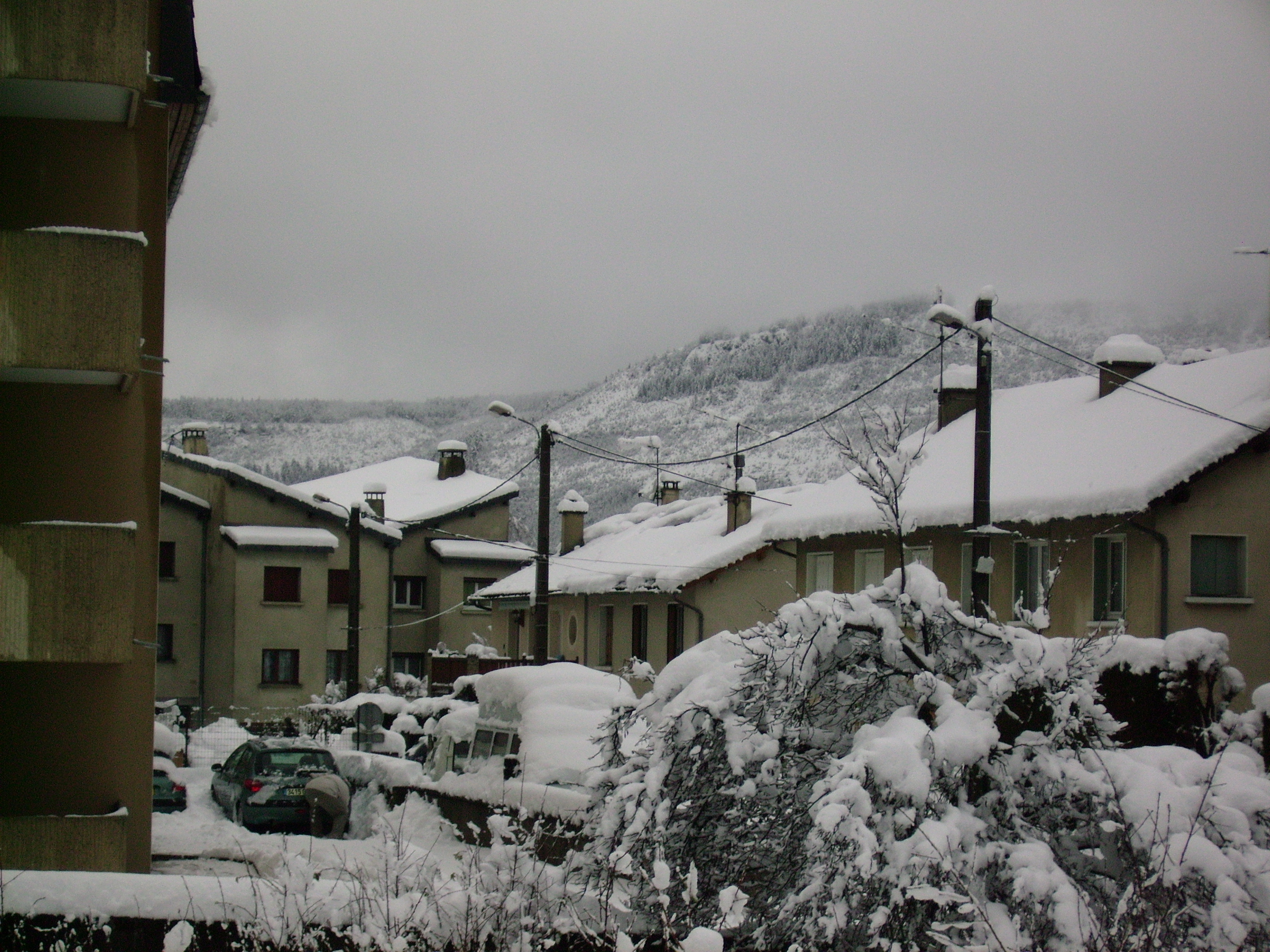
A view the Causse d'Auge in December 2008

Mende is subject to an oceanic stream that comes from the Aubrac and Mediterranean and flows from the Cévennes. The department of Lozère, Mende in particular, benefit from insolation (or sunlight) similar to that of Toulouse with approximately 2,069 hours of sunshine per year. The city, away from the mountains that surround it, has a more protected climate than the highlands of Gévaudan: So, average temperatures oscillate between 13 °C (55 °F) and 18 °C (64 °F). With respect to annual precipitation, data for the Lozère is between 600–1,800 millimetres (24–71 in), depending on the exposure of the regions, with up to 50 days of snow per year.

Climate data for Mende, elevation 710 m (2,330 ft), (1991–2020 normals, extremes 1984–present)
Month	Jan	Feb	Mar	Apr	May	Jun	Jul	Aug	Sep	Oct	Nov	Dec	Year
Record high °C (°F)	17.2 (63.0)	23.4 (74.1)	25.2 (77.4)	30.1 (86.2)	33.6 (92.5)	39.0 (102.2)	36.9 (98.4)	39.1 (102.4)	35.0 (95.0)	30.6 (87.1)	22.6 (72.7)	15.5 (59.9)	39.1 (102.4)
Mean daily maximum °C (°F)	7.1 (44.8)	8.7 (47.7)	12.6 (54.7)	15.2 (59.4)	19.6 (67.3)	23.7 (74.7)	26.6 (79.9)	26.7 (80.1)	21.8 (71.2)	17.0 (62.6)	10.9 (51.6)	7.0 (44.6)	16.4 (61.5)
Daily mean °C (°F)	2.9 (37.2)	3.7 (38.7)	6.9 (44.4)	9.3 (48.7)	13.3 (55.9)	17.0 (62.6)	19.3 (66.7)	19.2 (66.6)	15.1 (59.2)	11.5 (52.7)	6.6 (43.9)	3.1 (37.6)	10.7 (51.3)
Mean daily minimum °C (°F)	−1.3 (29.7)	−1.3 (29.7)	1.1 (34.0)	3.5 (38.3)	7.0 (44.6)	10.2 (50.4)	12.0 (53.6)	11.7 (53.1)	8.4 (47.1)	5.9 (42.6)	2.2 (36.0)	−0.7 (30.7)	4.9 (40.8)
Record low °C (°F)	−20.0 (−4.0)	−16.4 (2.5)	−14.8 (5.4)	−7.2 (19.0)	−2.2 (28.0)	0.4 (32.7)	3.5 (38.3)	0.4 (32.7)	−1.1 (30.0)	−5.7 (21.7)	−12.0 (10.4)	−15.1 (4.8)	−20.0 (−4.0)
Average precipitation mm (inches)	60.4 (2.38)	50.3 (1.98)	49.1 (1.93)	78.9 (3.11)	84.3 (3.32)	69.8 (2.75)	52.0 (2.05)	63.2 (2.49)	90.4 (3.56)	85.6 (3.37)	93.5 (3.68)	68.6 (2.70)	846.1 (33.31)
Average precipitation days (≥ 1.0 mm)	8.9	7.5	7.6	9.9	9.5	7.8	6.0	7.2	8.0	9.3	10.1	9.2	100.9
Source: Meteociel

Between 1971 and 2000, monthly rainfall ranged from 50 millimetres (2.0 in) (March) and 90 millimetres (3.5 in) (September).

In more detail, here are some statements in Mende records since 1985:

Lowest temperature	−23.7 °C (−10.7 °F)
Coldest day	12 January 1987
Coldest year	1984
Highest temperature	37.1 °C (98.8 °F)
Hottest day	27 June 2019
Hottest year	2009
Maximum rain in 24 hours	127 millimetres (5.0 in)
Wettest day	20 September 1980
Driest year	2011
Wettest year	1994

=== Routes and transportation ===
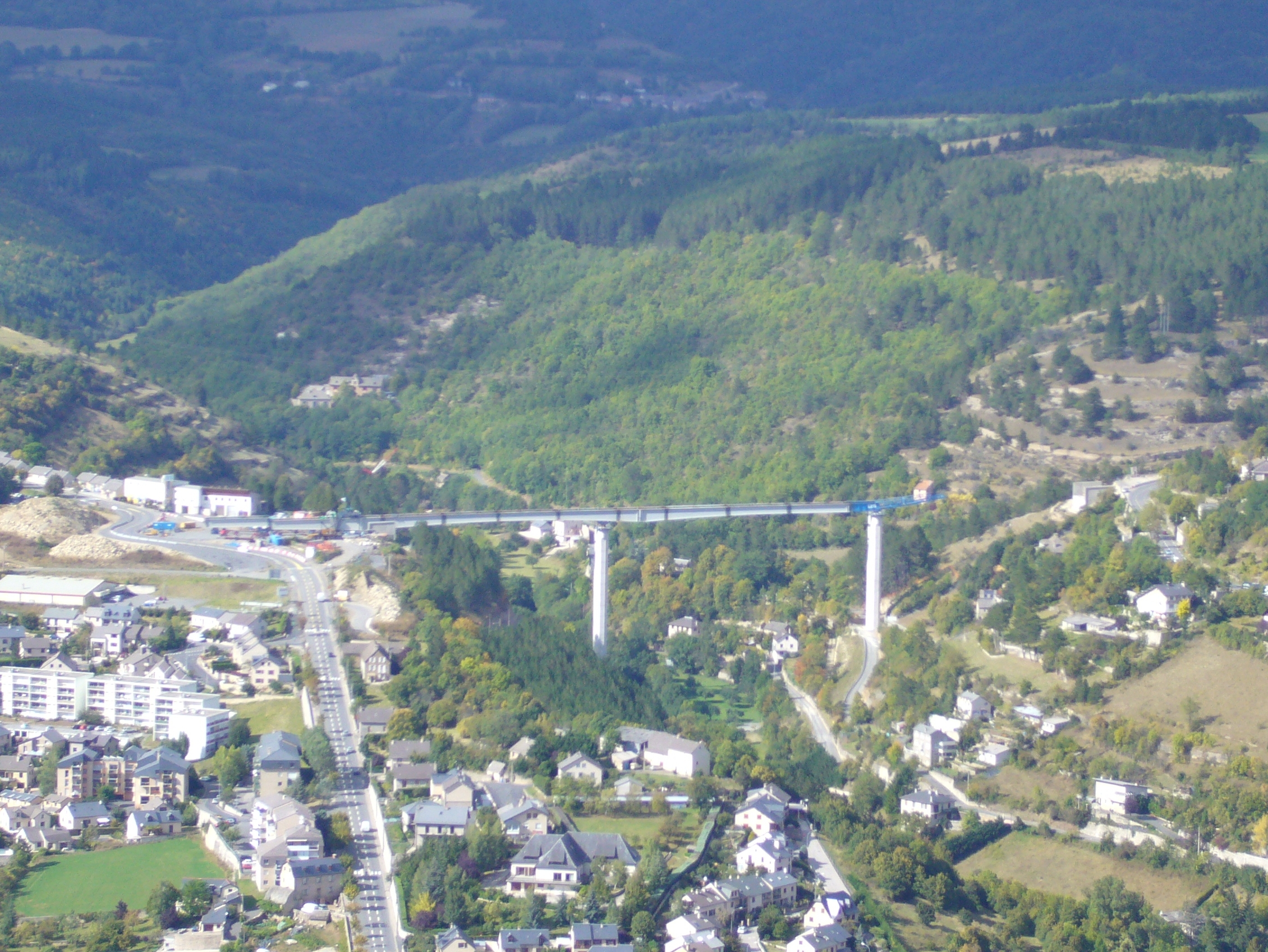
The Rieucros Viaduct in September 2007

Mende is located in the centre of the Lozère department and therefore centralises the roads. The city has rail and air access, but the Lot is not navigable (too shallow) as with all the rivers of the department (except for recreational canoeing, or in rare exceptions for the transport of people such as the crossing of the Tarn towards La Malène).

==== Road network ====
Mende is located on the Route Nationale 88, linking Lyon and Toulouse. The road comes from Balsièges to the west and Badaroux to the east. This axis can be reached easily. Haute-Loire and Ardèche are to the east, via Langogne and Aveyron is to the west via La Canourgue-Banassac, as well as the A75 autoroute. A road doubling project is underway in the department, bypassing Mende from the north. This doubling is however a long project (1993), having had several outlines and some opposition. The project was finally abandoned in October 2012 making Lozère a department without draft dual carriageways on RN 88. Indeed, its neighbours Aveyron and Tarn continue their projects of dual carriageways between Rodez and Toulouse with all expected to be commissioned in December 2015. The work of the Rodez - Séverac section should be completed by the end of 2019. The same will be the case for Haute-Loire, which continues its road access. However, the workarounds of Mende and Langogne are budgeted. These projects in adjacent departments will reach major cities nearby to Mende (Rodez, Albi, Toulouse, Le Puy and even Lyon). Finally, the economic impact or the absence of dual carriageways in Lozere must be assessed in the medium and long term.

Furthermore, a viaduct (the Rieucros Viaduct) commissioned in December 2009 will be used to ensure a first bypass of Mende. It connects the industrial area of the Causse d'Auge to the technological centre of Valcroze (and the RD 42) and also helps to relieve the traffic connecting the districts north and northwest of the city.

The RN 88 deviation from Mende should be the first from Pelouse to reach up to the Causse d'Auge with an "expressway" configuration. Then it would continue on the D 806 (ex RN 106 north) to the Rieucros Viaduct, and then a new section of the viaduct to the Mende exit in the hamlet of La Thébaïde (west bypass). These two sections will only be of two lanes. Subsequently, the expressway from the Causse d'Auge will be directly linked to the A 75.

Another national road, the RN 106, formerly ran through the city. This name is no longer valid for the section coming from the Gard and joining Mende via Florac (it is then of the RN 88 on the stretch between Balsièges and Mende). The northern part of the road was decommissioned in 2007 and now bears the name of D 806. This stretch goes from Mende to Saint-Chély-d'Apcher (and the A75 autoroute) via Chastel-Nouvel.

Secondary access is provided by the RD 42 from the northwest, which joins the RN 88 at Barjac, and by the RD 25 which, passing through the Côte de la Croix Neuve, crosses Mont Mimat before arriving at the Valdonnez.

==== Rail network ====
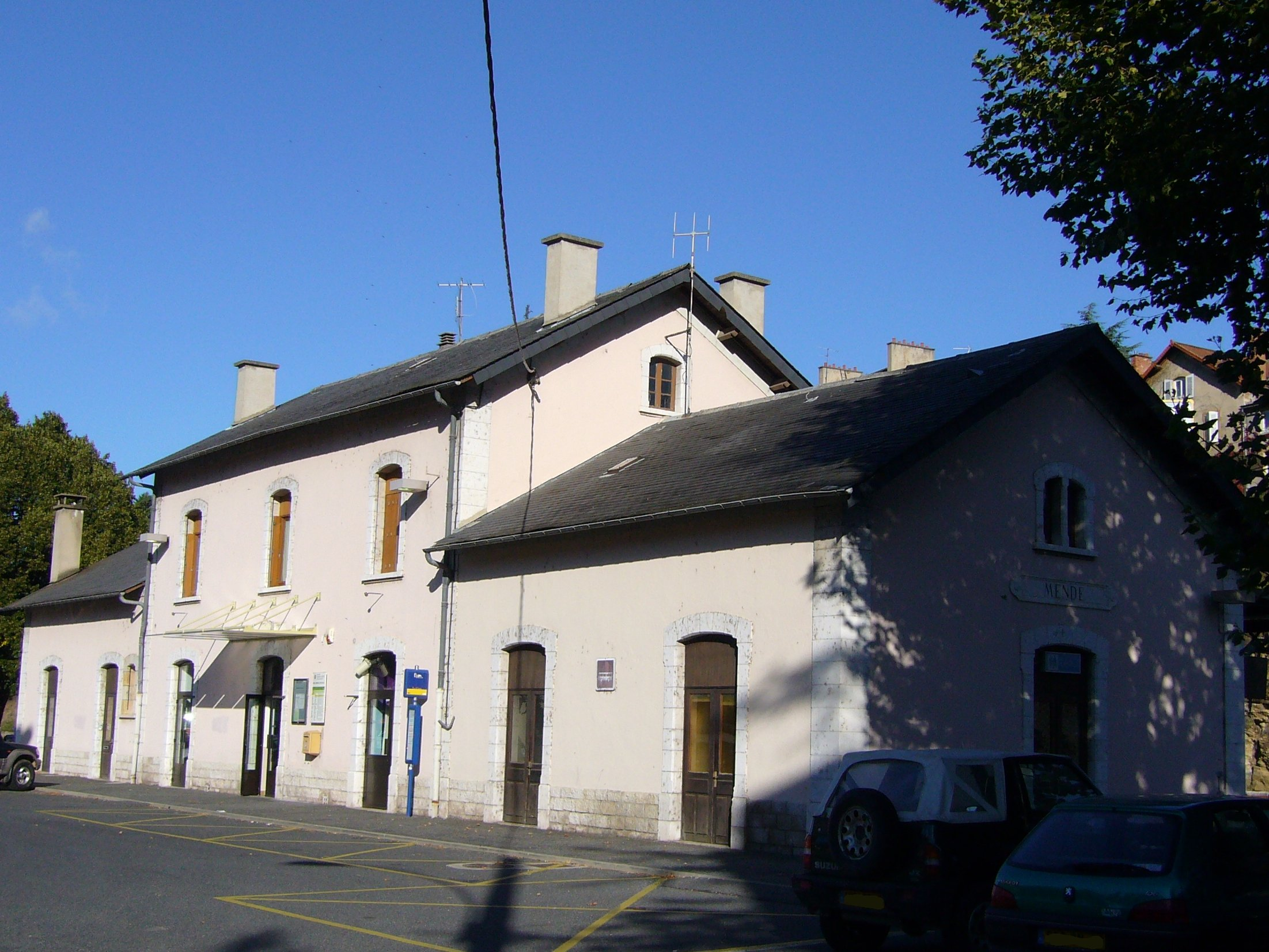
The Gare de Mende

Mende features an SNCF railway station, located on the railway line of the Translozérien, between Le Monastier (the Causses line) and La Bastide - Saint-Laurent-les-Bains (line of the Cevennes). This line, built at the very beginning of the 20th century, bears the nickname of "ligne du toit de la France" [the roof of France line], and Mende is the main railway station. Ten weekly links are provided by rail.

The station is also the starting point of the TER connection to Clermont-Ferrand by bus, which is daily.

==== Urban transport network ====
Referred to as TUM (for Transports Urbains Mendois) the urban transport network is exclusively equipped with buses, which run through the city and some nearby villages (Les Boulaines, Chabrits, Chabannes). Since its establishment in 2000, it has replaced the school bus service. The urban transport network is also responsible for the management of the pay car parks in the city. A part of the city centre is also exclusively pedestrian.

==== Air transport ====
Nearby Airports
Name	Destinations	Distance
Rodez-Aveyron	France; Europe	115 km (71 mi)
Clermont-Ferrand Aulnat	France; Europe	200 km (120 mi)
Lyon–Saint-Exupéry	France; Europe; North America	240 km (150 mi)
Toulouse–Blagnac	France; Europe; North America	270 km (170 mi)

The prefecture of the Lozère department shares its airfield with the neighbouring village of Brenoux. This airfield, located on Mont Mimat, is thus 200 kilometres (120 mi) from Clermont-Ferrand, 215 kilometres (134 mi) from Montpellier and 250 kilometres (160 mi) away from Lyon and Toulouse. Highlights include it being the site of the final scene of the film La Grande Vadrouille, and also of five stages of the Tour de France (1995, 2005, 2010, 2015 and 2018).

Furthermore, a Mende-Paris air link was implemented in October 2007. However, the flight was departing from the aerodrome of Le Puy-en-Velay, located 90 kilometres (56 mi) from Mende and reached by a shuttle. This connection was born of a desire to open up Mende to air travel, which is indeed late at this level for a prefecture, and has no direct flight to Paris unlike its neighbours Clermont-Ferrand, Rodez, Aurillac or Le Puy-en-Velay.

Since the beginning of 2008, a study has been conducted by the CCI of the Lozère department, in order to discuss the possibility of the establishment of a link between the Lozerian prefecture and the regional capital, Montpellier but four years after the launch of this study, no concrete project to date has been presented.

Finally, two more major airports with international influence and close to Mende are Clermont-Ferrand Aulnat and Rodez-Aveyron.

== Urban planning ==
=== Five historic sections ===
Mende around 1200

In the 13th century, the city was concentrated in what is now the city centre, bounded by the boulevards, and formerly the ramparts. It was then split into five sections (or neighbourhoods) known as pans: Auriac, Aygues-Passe, Champnau, Chastel and Claustres.

When it was initially named as such, the Pan d'Auriac was mainly a place of settlement, before becoming the quartier des pénitents blancs [district of the white penitents] who settled there. The Pan d'Aygues-Passe (or Aigues-Passe), meaning "water that passes", owes its name to the inclination of its streets, where the water flowed during cleaning. The Pan de Champnau derives its name from new field, and includes what was a new residential area, at north of the city. The Pan de Chastel is the old commercial district of the city. It is located towards the Chastel Gate, which led then to Chastel-Nouvel, where a castle stood which was property of the bishops. Finally the Pan des Claustres, whose name comes from cloisters, was the largest of the city and is now between the Place Urbain V and Foirail, i.e. between the two tombs of Saint Privat (the chapel Saint-Ilpide on the hill of the executioner, and the crypt of Sainte-Thècle under the cathedral square).

=== The modern districts of the city ===
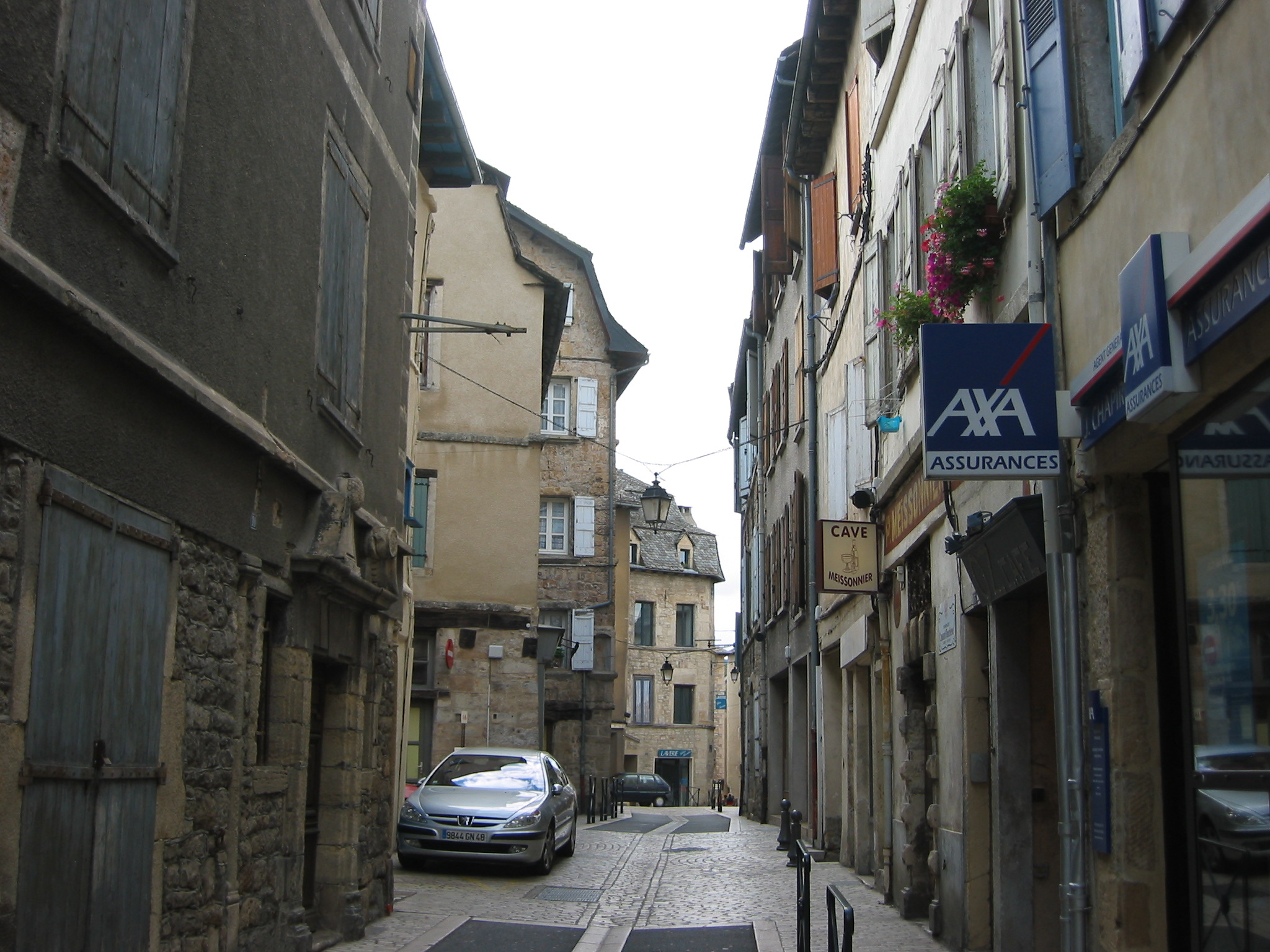
The Rue Basse

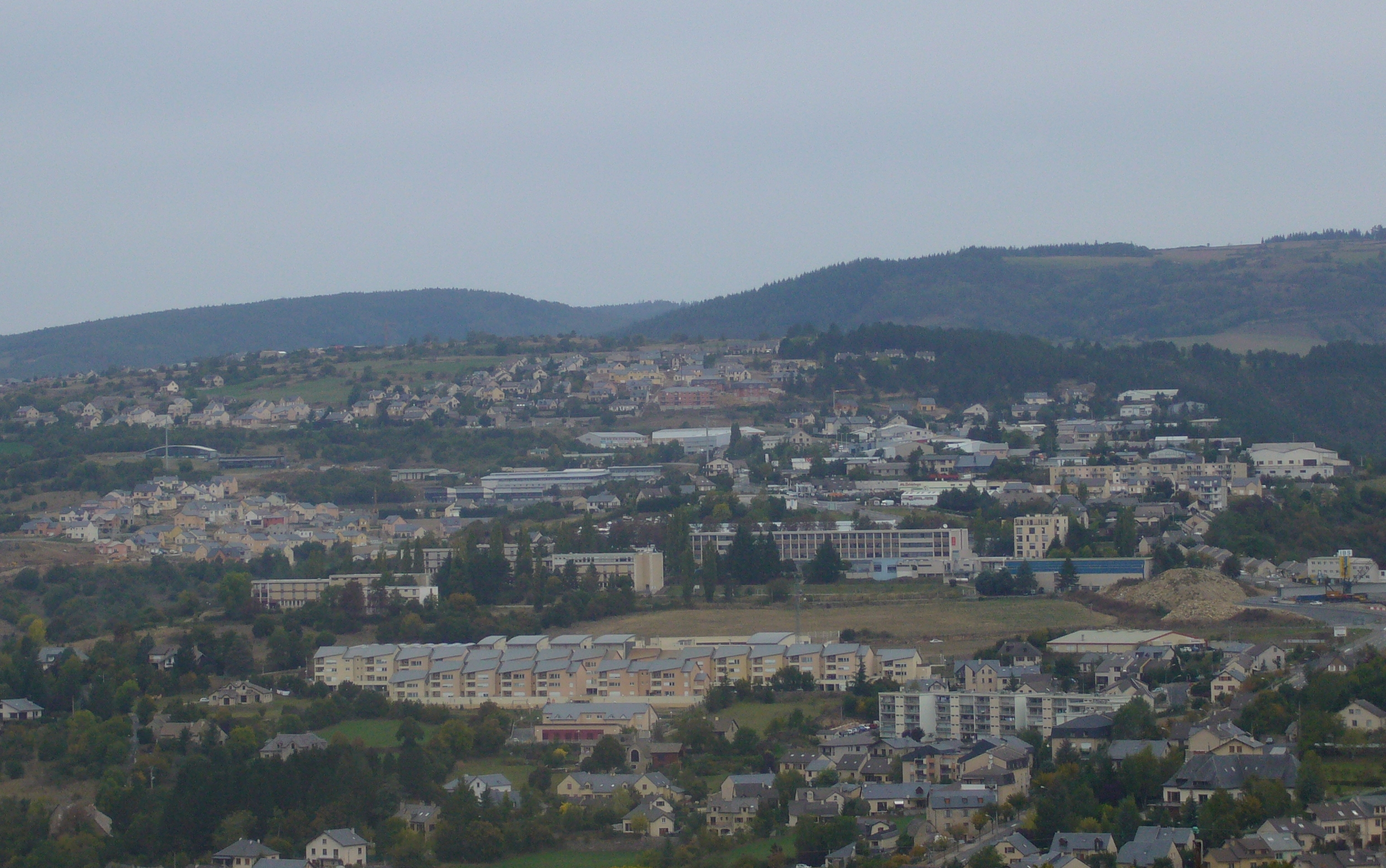
The Valcroze district and the village of Chabannes

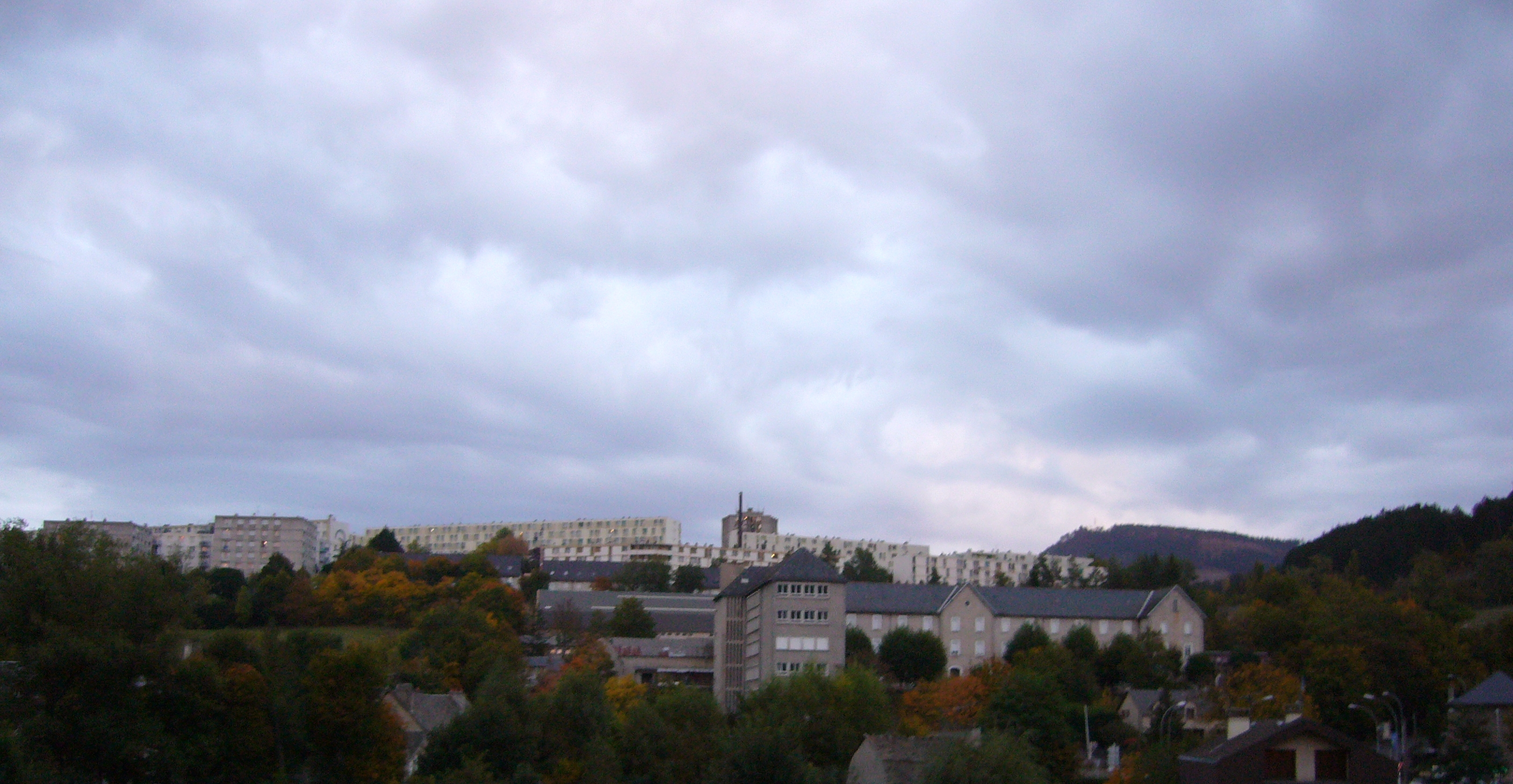
The Fontanille district and the Notre Dame High School

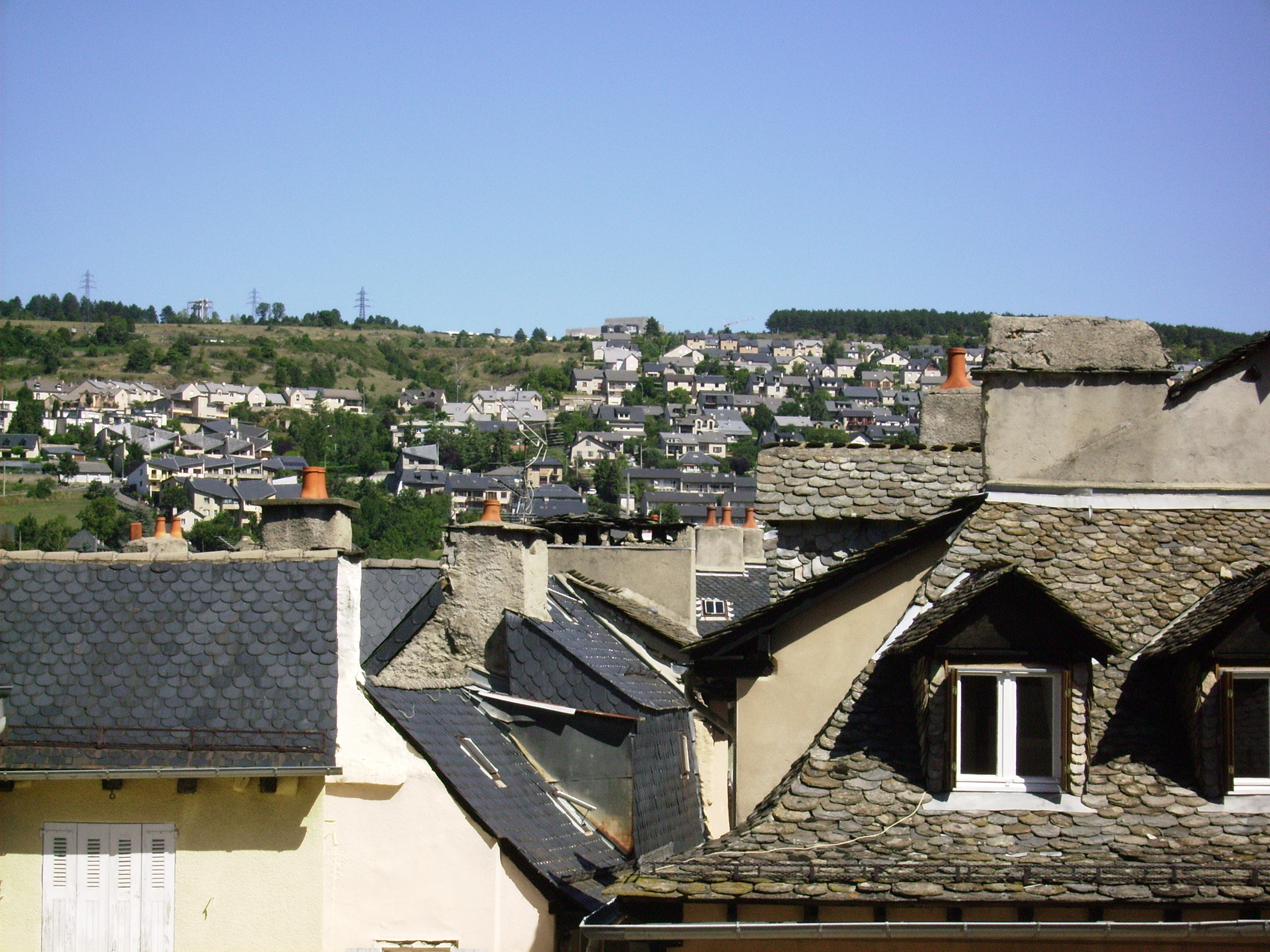
The Chaldecoste district from the Place de la République

- The historic centre

The historic city centre is bordered by boulevards which took the place of the ancient walls. In addition to housing, the centre is mostly occupied by convenience stores and artisans. Beyond the boulevards, there are other houses as well as government buildings. The General Council and the prefecture indeed share the former Bishop's Palace, but services are scattered throughout the city. Allée Piencourt connects downtown roads to Badaroux and Chastel-Nouvel, near the ancient diocese (pré claux and pré vival) having been built.

- Mende North (Chaldecoste), the Causse d'Auge

North of the Allée Piencourt, past the Berlière Bridge, dwellings are present at the foot of the Causse d'Auge. These were established in several instalments over the 19th and 20th centuries, the first of these being Chaldecoste. It is in this part of the city that the large and the small seminary as well as the Convent of Carmel are found. The city extends to the north in the direction of Alteyrac (commune of Chastel-Nouvel). Between these areas and Alteyrac is located the zone of economic activities (ZAE) of the Causse d'Auge. The northern districts often bear names of flowers, this part of the city that historically sheltered gardens and vineyards, along the draille linking the Plateau du Palais du Roi [King's Palace Plateau].

The causse is bounded by two streams, the Rieucros in the east and the Rieucros d'Abaïsse to the west.

- Fontanilles

Above the Badaroux road, on a hill, lies the Fontanilles district. It was originally social housing. At the foot of the hill is the Lycée Notre-Dame, while beyond the district of Saint-Laurent (where one finds traces of history with the presence of a chapel and a windmill) and, later, the Gardès ZAE. In this part, to the west of Gardès, is also the village of Sirvens where traces of a Gallo-Roman villa were discovered.

- Mende South, Mont Mimat

Stuck between Fontanille, Mont Mimat and the city centre, are districts located roadside above pré claux. In this area are located the centre of firefighters, the Château of Bellesagne and the former gendarmerie. The market is also in this area, but more to the east than the precedents cited (beyond the boulevards, however). Above it lies the Vabre district and Hill of the Executioner where the first traces of dwellings of the city were found. Also nearby is the city's prison.

- Le Chapitre and the road to Chabrits

In the westerly direction, found the District of Le Chapitre with the sports complex and the holiday village. This area is at the foot of a portion of the Causse de Changefège, where homes are installed along the Chabrits road (Avenue du 11-Novembre, north-west of the city). It is in this part of the city which the district of Valcroze is found (new in the 19th century), the Chabrits ZAE and technology park.

- Balsièges road

The other side of the Lot, along the Route nationale 88 (France), is found the avenue of the Gorges du Tarn and the area of Ramille. It is in this part where retail establishments are found. The Ramille zone saw the introduction, despite some criticism about the instability of the ground, of the hypermarket of the department, as well as a commercial area.

=== City map ===
Map of the city of Mende

On the map are the main roads of the city. To the west, the RN 88 is joined to Balsièges, passing through the Rocher de Moïse (classified site) located at the left end. To the northwest, it is the hamlet of Chabannes, and further to Chabrits. To the south, Mont Mimat is found, where the new cross stands which symbolically marks the top of the hill (although it continues a little higher). This road leads to the Hermitage of Saint Privat, at the cross of the same name and the route of Valdonnez (Lanuéjols, Brenoux, Saint-Bauzile).

To the east, Fontanille district is on a hillock, circumvented by the Lot. Behind lies the district of Saint-Laurent, then the ZAE de Gardès (and the village of the same name) and the village of Sirvens. Following the RN 88, one reaches Badaroux. Finally to the north, is the area of the Chaldecoste (broken down into several districts: Bergerie, Chanteperdrix, Vignette, etc.) where one can reach the ZAE du causse d'Auge. Further to the north, one finds Chastel-Nouvel before returning to the ground of Randon and the Plateau du Palais du Roi. The drinking water of the city of Mende comes from this direction, because of the Lac de Charpal reservoir, which is the main source.

=== Housing ===
In 2017, Mende had 6,851 residences for an official population of 12,134 people. 87% of them are primary residences and 6.1% of secondary residences, which contrasts sharply with the figure of the Lozère department amounting to a 32.3% share of secondary housing.

The population has been growing for several years, and the city has acquired new quarters over the years: Chaldecoste and Chanteperdrix in the 1970s, La Bergerie in the 1990s, and Valcroze in the 2000s. The city has 17.9% of HLM-type accommodations.

59% of dwellings have four rooms or more and 19% have three rooms. The city is composed of many individual homes, small and large dwellings remaining in the minority. However, one can see that between 1990 and 1999 there was an increase of 85.3% of dwellings of one or two rooms. This can partly be explained by the development of higher education, with the branch of the University of Perpignan.

== Toponymy ==
The region is an ancient site of settlement dating back to the Bronze Age, although the capital of the Gévaudan, the Gallic period then Gallo-Roman, was Anderitum. Found in the ancient texts are the names of Mimate, Mimata (mountain), which refer to this town at the foot of Mons Mimatensis (Mont Mimat). In the same spirit, another name circulating is that of Viculus Mimatensis (or Vicus Mimatensis). It is the city which gave its name to Mont Mimat ("mount of the Mendois", literally) and not vice versa.

== History ==
=== Gallo-Roman era ===
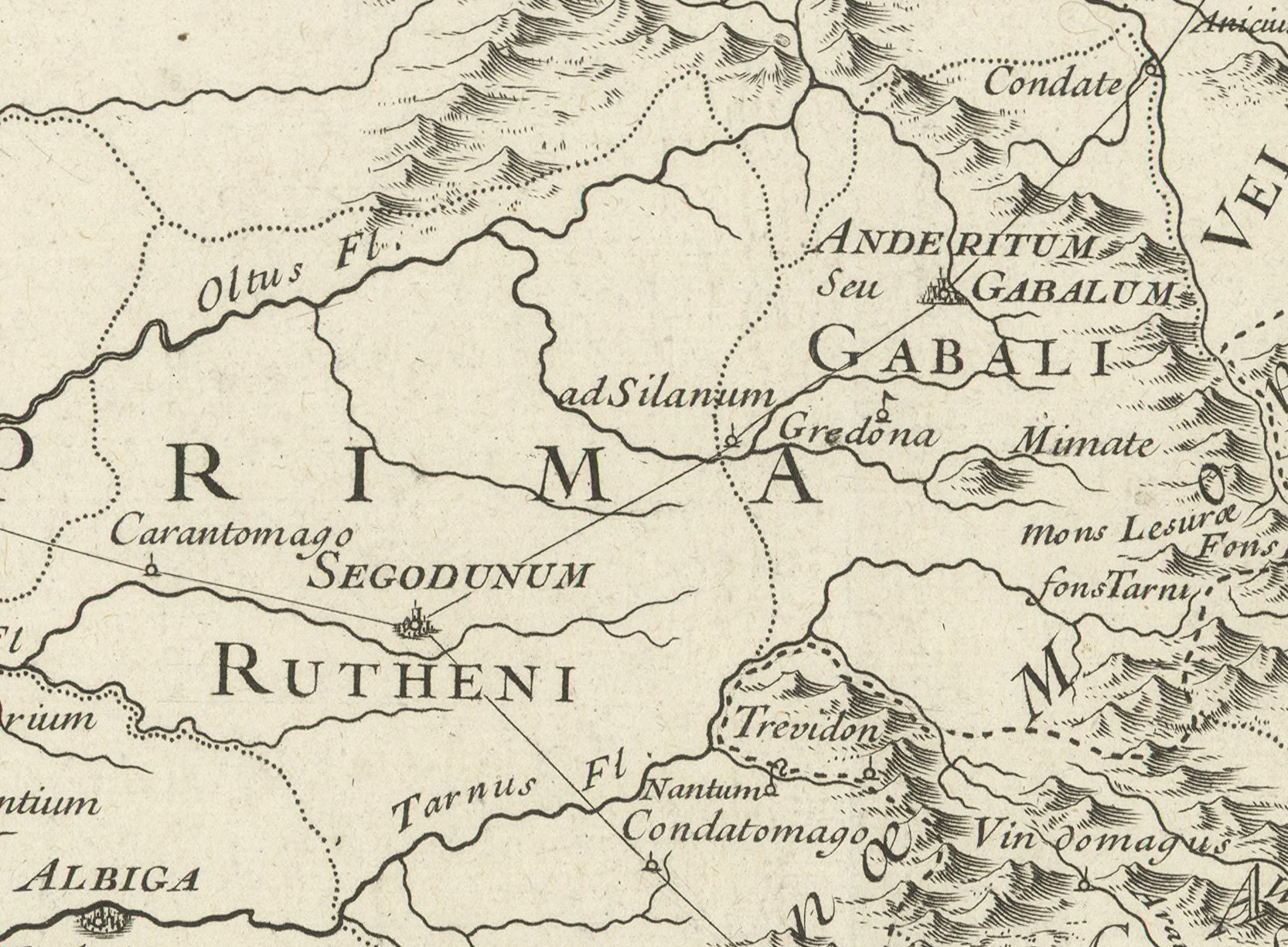
On this map is found Anderitum (Javols), Mimate (Mende) and Gredone (Grèzes).

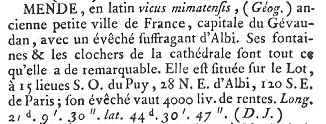
Mende in the Encyclopédie ou Dictionnaire raisonné des sciences, des arts et des métiers

Traces of dwellings dating from 200 BC were found, ancient Roman villae, as well as around the city. However, residents could have been be domiciled here well before. Indeed, on Mont Mimat to Chapieu, a dolmen was found around 1913 including a trepanned skull. The other surrounding plateaux also attest this presence with other dolmens (on the Causse de Changefege for example). These remains may date from the Chalcolithic period.

The city, strictly speaking, dates from the Middle Ages, and it is not found cited at the end of the 6th century by Gregory of Tours in his Histoire des Francs. This text speaks of the martyrdom of Saint Privat, the first bishop of the Gabali, who was the origin of a pilgrimage to the hermitage and the caves where he had retired. Mende in the 3rd century was then only a village. The history of Privat is thus situated around the 3rd century, while he was sent by Austromoine to evangelize the Gévaudan. It was during this period that the Alemanni invaded the country, guided by their leader, Chrocus.

The Gabali took refuge in the fortress of Grèzes where they were under siege for two years. Their bishop, Privat, was meanwhile in one of the caves of Mont Mimat which he had converted into a hermitage. When Chrocus learned that the bishop was not among his people, he went looking for him to use as a hostage in order to get the Gabali to leave Grèzes. Privat was martyred at his cave on Mont Mimat near the village of Mimate. Presented to the Gabali, he refused to deliver his people despite all the barbaric tortures to which he was subjected (according to Gregory of Tours: "The good shepherd refused to deliver his sheep to wolves, and they tried to force his to sacrifice to demons"). Exhausted, the Alemanni would leave the Gabali free, by promising them peace. Privat succumbed to his injuries in the following days. His act of resistance, refusing to deliver his compatriots, thus earned him great popular fervour, and it was around his tomb and his hermitage that pilgrimage began, allowing the village to grow.

=== Middle Ages ===
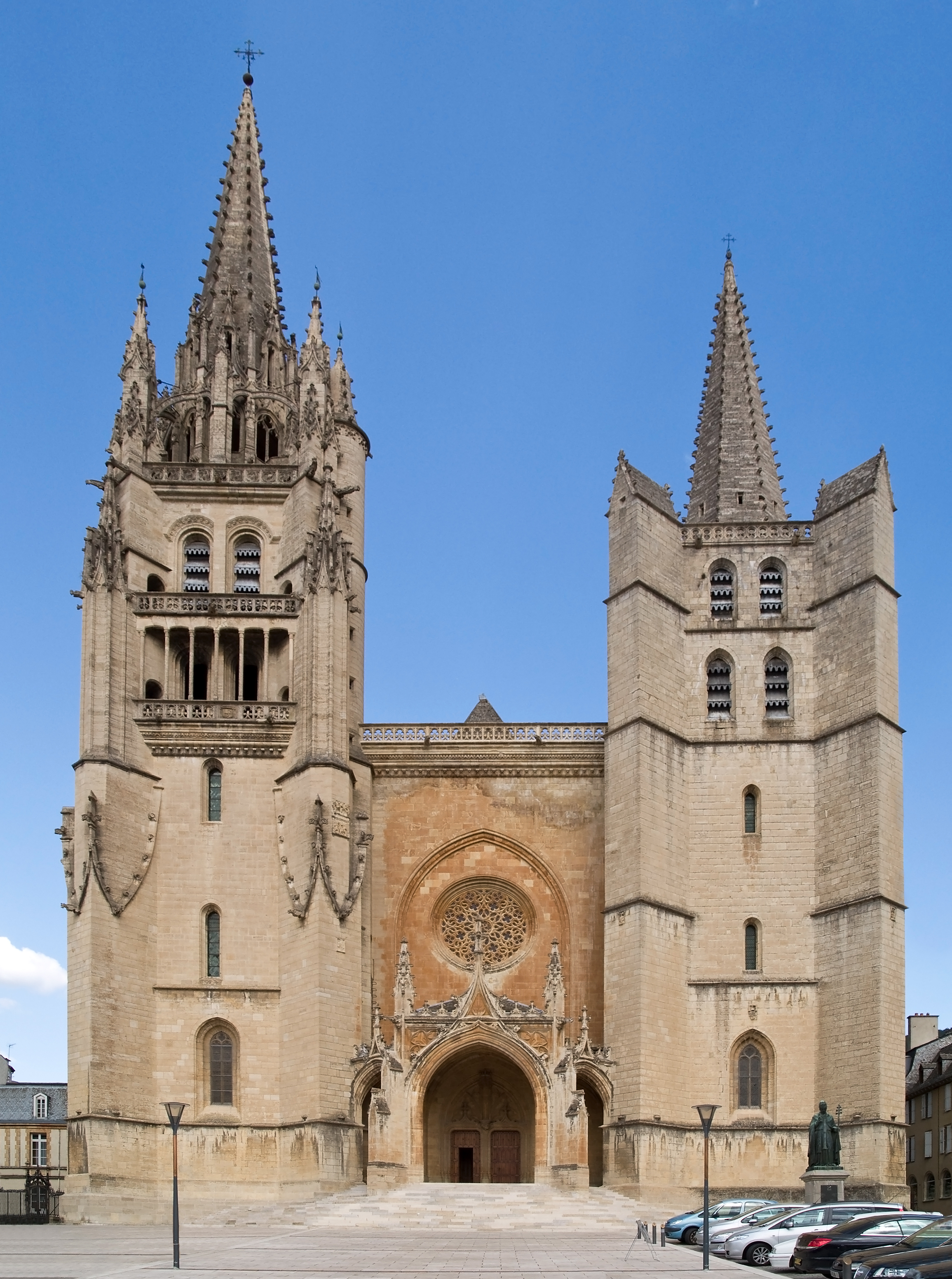
The mismatching cathedral and bell towers

In the 12th century Gévaudan was part of the County of Barcelona. In Mende, the counties have a castle, the castel frag. Three other lords had their castle around the Romanesque church: That of Canilhac (who owned the archtreasurer rights of the church), that of Cabrières (who was granted rights of archdeacon) and Dolan (who administered and ruled the episcopal home during the interregnum of bishops). In 1161, Mende, who was under the suzerainty of the King of France, saw his Bishop Aldebert III get the royal rights. It was the golden bull, an act signed by the king and marked with a royal seal in gold, which contained the terms of this agreement. It thus gave Aldebert and his successors, in perpetuity, the Royal power and the full powers of justice on the inhabitants of the bishopric. This fact is quite rare because only four golden bulls in six centuries were granted by the Kings of France.

It was from this time that the city walls were built. Aldebert wished to protect the city and secure channels that lead there. he recovered and also built the fortress of Chapieu on Mont Mimat, and was done so that it could accommodate a garrison. This allowed the monitoring of the direct route between Mont Lozère and Villefort, in other words towards the Regordane Way, trade route.

At that time, however, Mende was not provided the civil and religious capital of Gévaudan. In fact the power was always dependent of two entities: The county and Viscount of Grèzes. The Viscount, property of the King of Aragon, was recovered by the King of France in 1258. The bishop had great power as a vassal, but he didn't have the total legitimacy of some Royal officials. This situation ended from 1307 with the Act of paréage between Bishop Guillaume VI Durand and King Philip IV. Indeed, it definitively fixed the possessions of the king and those of the bishop, even if some disputes persisted.

During the Hundred Years' War security increased with the strengthening of the fortifications and the construction of ditches to 1361-1362. At that time, the chapter of Mende had a castle on the heights of the city, Chastel-Nouvel. In 1370 many locals felt safe from the ramparts of the city, despite threats from the routiers. Also, few of them took refuge in Chastel-Nouvel. But the walls were insufficient, and could not prevent the pillages. This period isolated Mende from its neighbours, including Le Puy-en-Velay, and waited the arrival of the Constable of France, Bertrand du Guesclin, then the intervention of Charles VI and the liberation of the region so that the roads reopened around 1452.

In 1390, Bernardon de la Salle was in Mende, where John III of Armagnac sought, on behalf of the King of France, to put an end to the private war that Raymond de Turenne led against the Pope from Avignon. The Gascon signed as a witness to an agreement between the legate of Clement VII, Antoine de Lisa, Bishop of Maguelone, and a representative of the Viscount of Turenne. (Note: Raymond de Turenne came to Mende with his cousins Garin VIII, Baron d'Apcher en Gévaudan and Raoul de Lestrange, seigneur of Boulogne en Vivarais. A truce was agreed until 15 August 1391. The agreement was ratified in the name of Clement VII by François de Conzié, Archbishop of Arles, on 20 August 1390. Six days later, Raymond de Turenne committed sur les Saintes Envangiles de Dieu et par la foi de son corps à les tenir et accomplir loyalement et sans fraude. (on Saintes Envangiles of God and the faith of his body to keep and faithfully perform and without fraud.) Finally on 28 August in Avignon, Marie de Blois, Countess of Provence approved the agreement and affixed her seal.) This interview of Mende helped the Florentines to send ambassadors to solicit the Count of Armagnac. He was proposed to cross the Alps and attack the Count of Vertus in Lombardy. (Note: During his marriage to Isabeau of France, daughter of Jean le Bon, Galéas Visconti had received in dowry the county of Vertus in Champagne. This noble title, the only one which could boast the Visconti, was passed to Jean Galéas. The Embassy of Florence was discreet since it was only revealed officially three months later. Jean III of Armagnac had a score to settle with Jean Galéas about the rights of his sister Beatrix d'Armagnac to the estate of his uncle Barnabò. The ambassadors of Florence came propose alliance and financial support.)

It was also at this time that Pope Urban V began the work of the cathedral (1368), for a completion in 1467. By its letters patent, King Louis XI confirmed the privileges for this cathedral, granted by his predecessors, in September 1464.

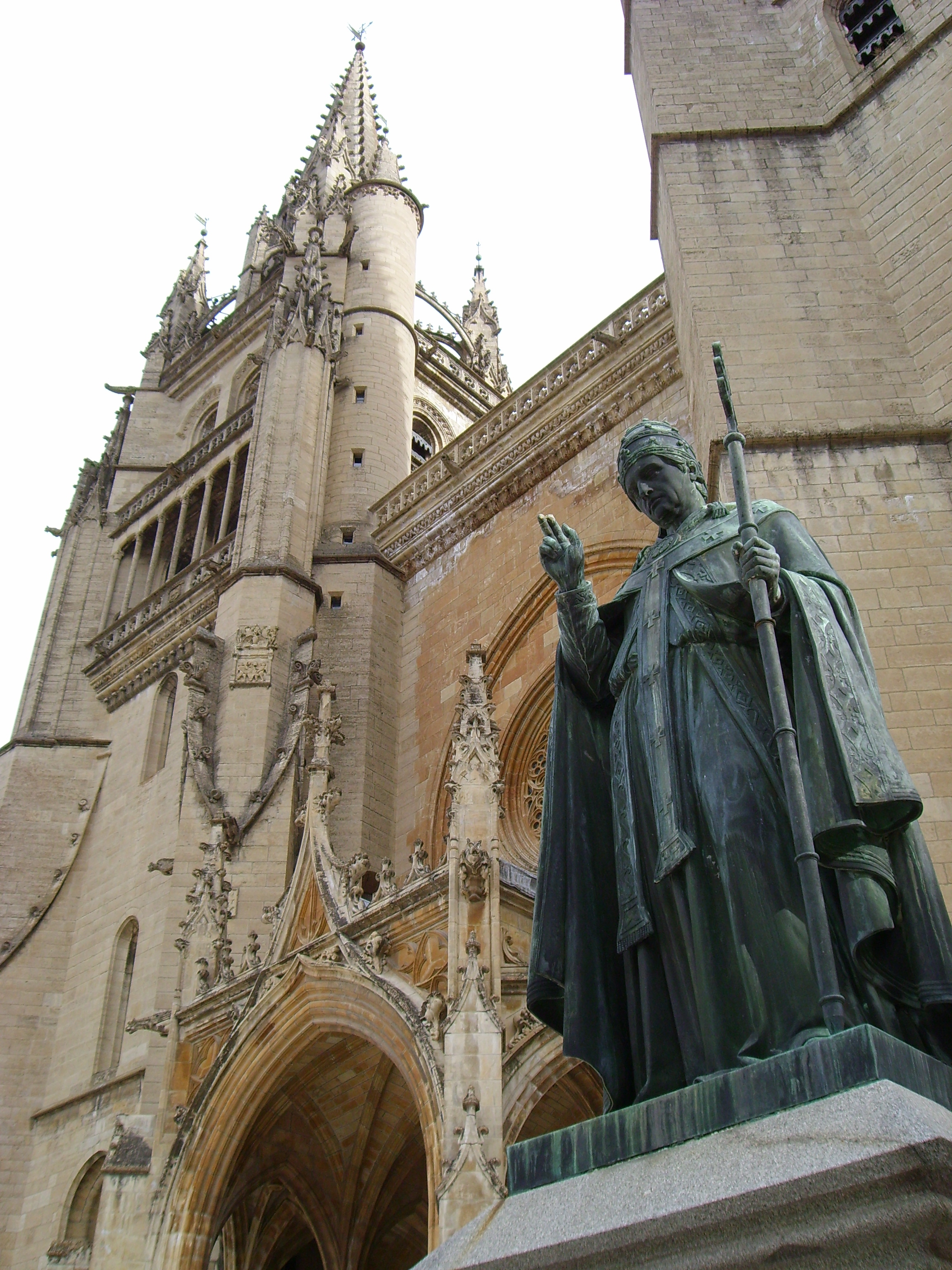
Statue of Pope Urban V

At the beginning of the 1470s, conflict erupted between Bishop Antoine de La Panouse and King Louis XI, because of the support that the bishop had given to the County of Armagnac when it had revolted. To counter it, the king subtracted La Panouse authority over the city which then became autonomous. It wasn't until 1478 that the bishops found authority over the city, sharing revenues with the consul.

At the end of the Hundred Years' War, Mende developed its production of drapery, and thus increased its role as a commercial crossroads between the Languedoc and Auvergne, exporting its fame. It is estimated that in the 16th century Mende was one of the richest dioceses of Languedoc before Montpellier and Toulouse. This wealth of the diocese reinforced the ecclesiastical power. Thus among the list of the bishops of the time one can count a number from the family of the Pope. Giuliano della Rovere was ordained bishop of Mende, although he never visited in the capital of Gévaudan (practice known as commendation). His nephews, Clement and François, succeeded him in this position. During his tenure, François adorned the cathedral with its bell towers, which one hosted the Non Pareille, the largest bell in the world.

In October 1485, when Clément de La Rovère came to the episcopal seat, old quarrels between the consul and the bishopric re-emerged, first mentioned with fear of losing this privilege. Thus they barricaded the gates of Mende, so that the bishop could not access. At this time the bishops primarily used their Balsièges Castle as a residence (that of Chanac being the summer residence). In vain as the Della Rovere family covered the full authority by notice of the king in 1492. The title of consul was held in place of the traditional title of trustee.

=== Renaissance ===
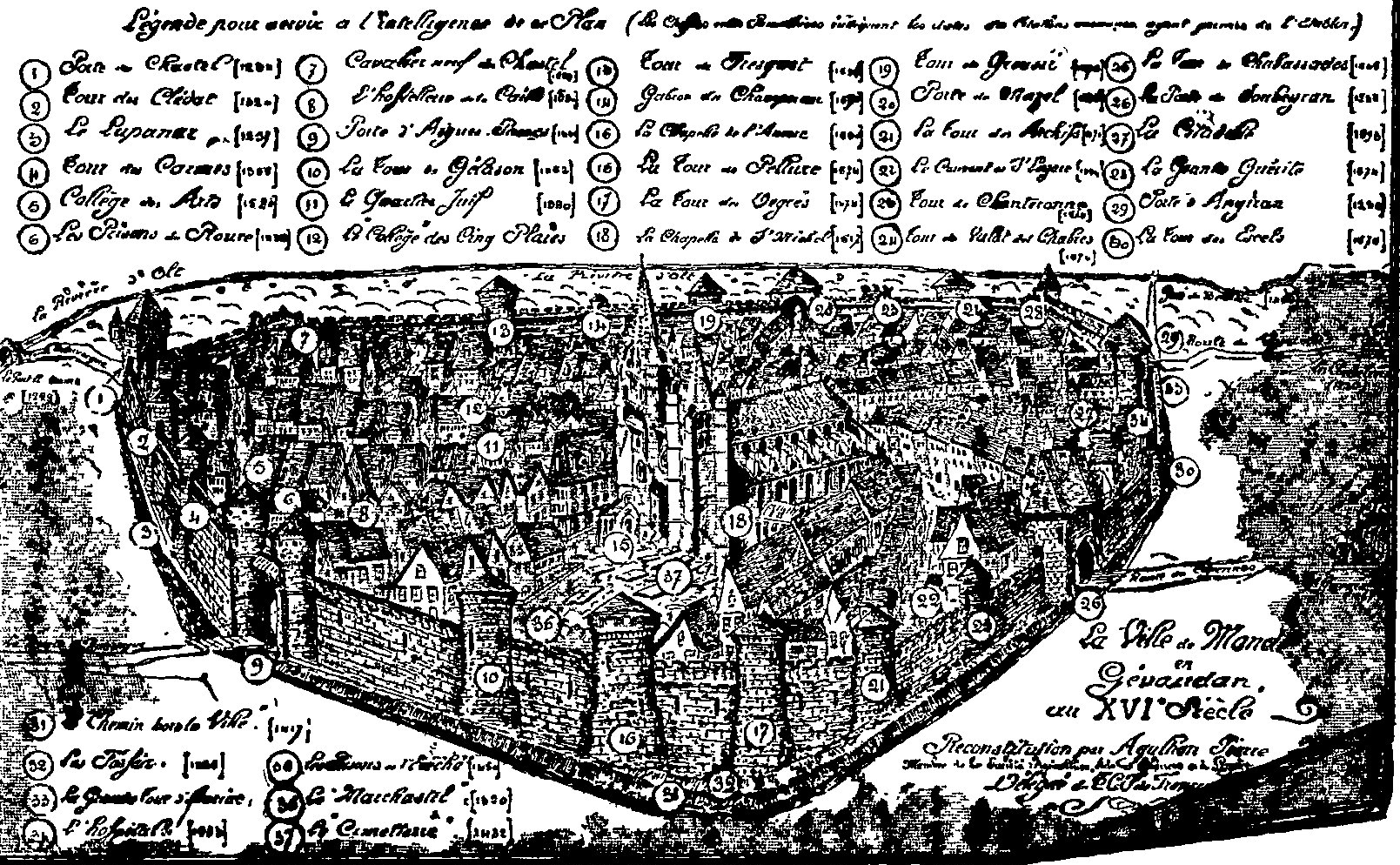
Mende in the 16th century from an old engraving

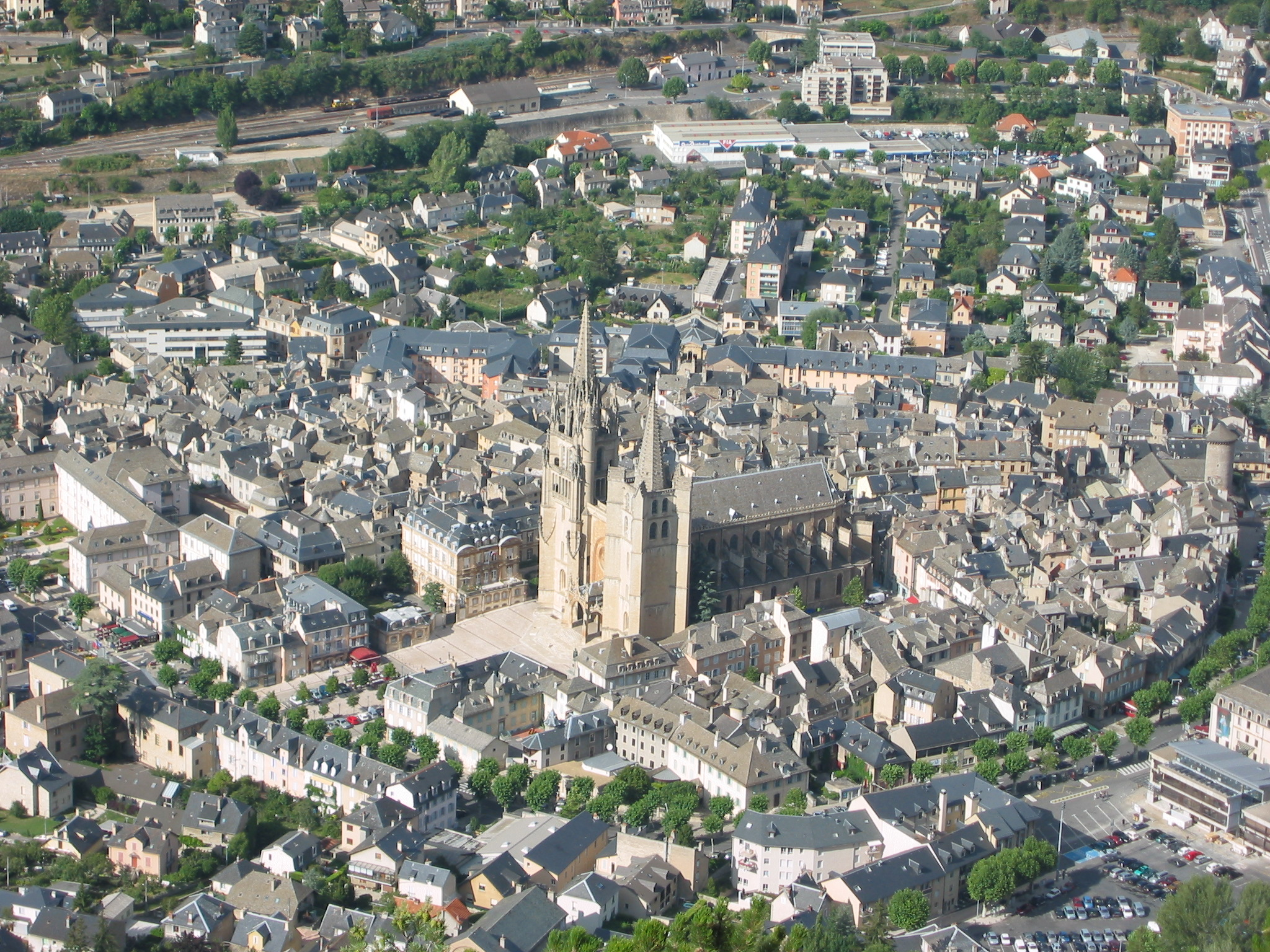
An aerial view of the cathedral

In the 16th century, the main events were the Reformation and the Wars of Religion which resulted. On 21 July 1562, 4,000 Protestants got within the walls of the city. They destroyed the unprotected monuments and besieged the city by depriving it of water. They withdrew four days later, largely due to being given 2,000 ecus. This ransom ensured the city a few years of peace.

During the St. Bartholomew's Day massacre, Baron Astorg de Peyre (Note: François Astorg Peyre specifically Cardaillac) was murdered in the king's room: his widow then hired a young man, Matthieu Merle to avenge the death of her husband. From 1569 to 1576 he held with his troops the fortress of Grèzes where he gradually seized the north of Gévaudan. From 1577 he moved with his troops to Marvejols intending to seize Mende, although not ceasing his conquests to the north, he failed however in August 1578 at Saint-flour. The night of Christmas 1579, to enter the city, Merle's soldiers waited until the people of Mendes were at midnight mass, and made their takeover of the city. According to one account, Merle's soldiers "seized the city by betrayal and massacred 400 priests or followers, most of them within the walls itself, of the cathedral."

During his stay in Mende, Merle made further fortification to the city, not hesitating razing 120 homes to restore the ramparts. In February 1581, while he ruled all the Gévaudan, he enforced the threat he had made to the people. He had in fact asked them to deliver 4,000 ecus, a sum that the Mendois could not collect. He partially destroyed Mende Cathedral built by Pope Urban V. He saved a bell tower to avoid damaging the episcopal palace where his home was established. It was at this time that the Non Pareille was melted, the biggest bell in the world, to manufacture culverins and other cannonballs. The city was liberated on bail that year thanks to the intervention of the King of Navarre.

The city liberated, a seneschal was created to ensure the peace. Response to the attack of Merle was organised in 1586 against the town of Marvejols, led by baron de Saint-Vidal. It was during this response that the Peyre fortress disappeared from the rock of Peyre. The seneschal took its place. The Tower of Auriac, today known as the Tower of Penitents, was built to accommodate one hundred soldiers. The seneschal gradually took precedence over the diocese, which called for the help of the Duke of Languedoc in 1597. It was after this episode that the Seneschal of Mende disappeared.

=== From the 17th century to the French Revolution ===
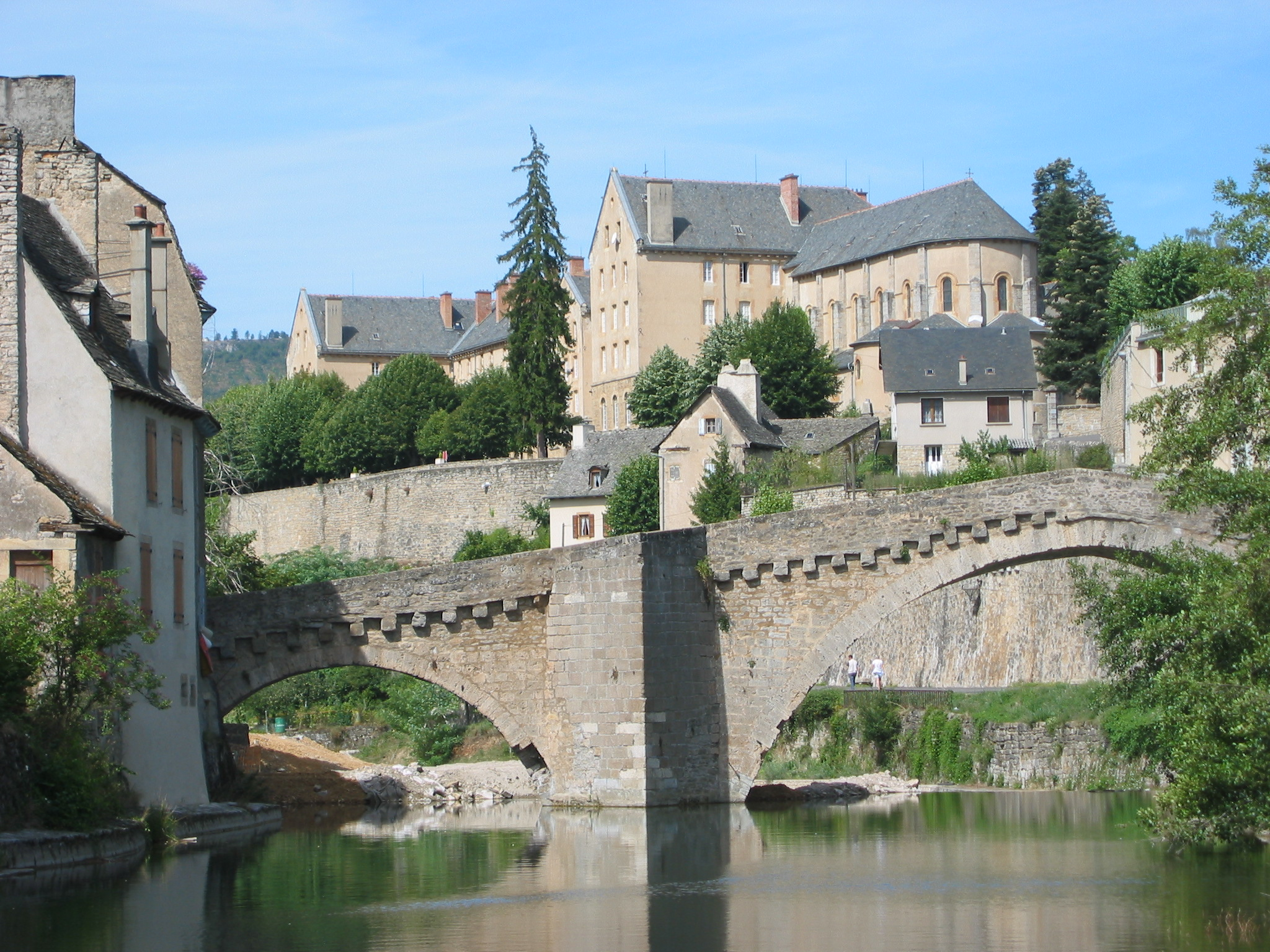
The Notre-Dame Bridge

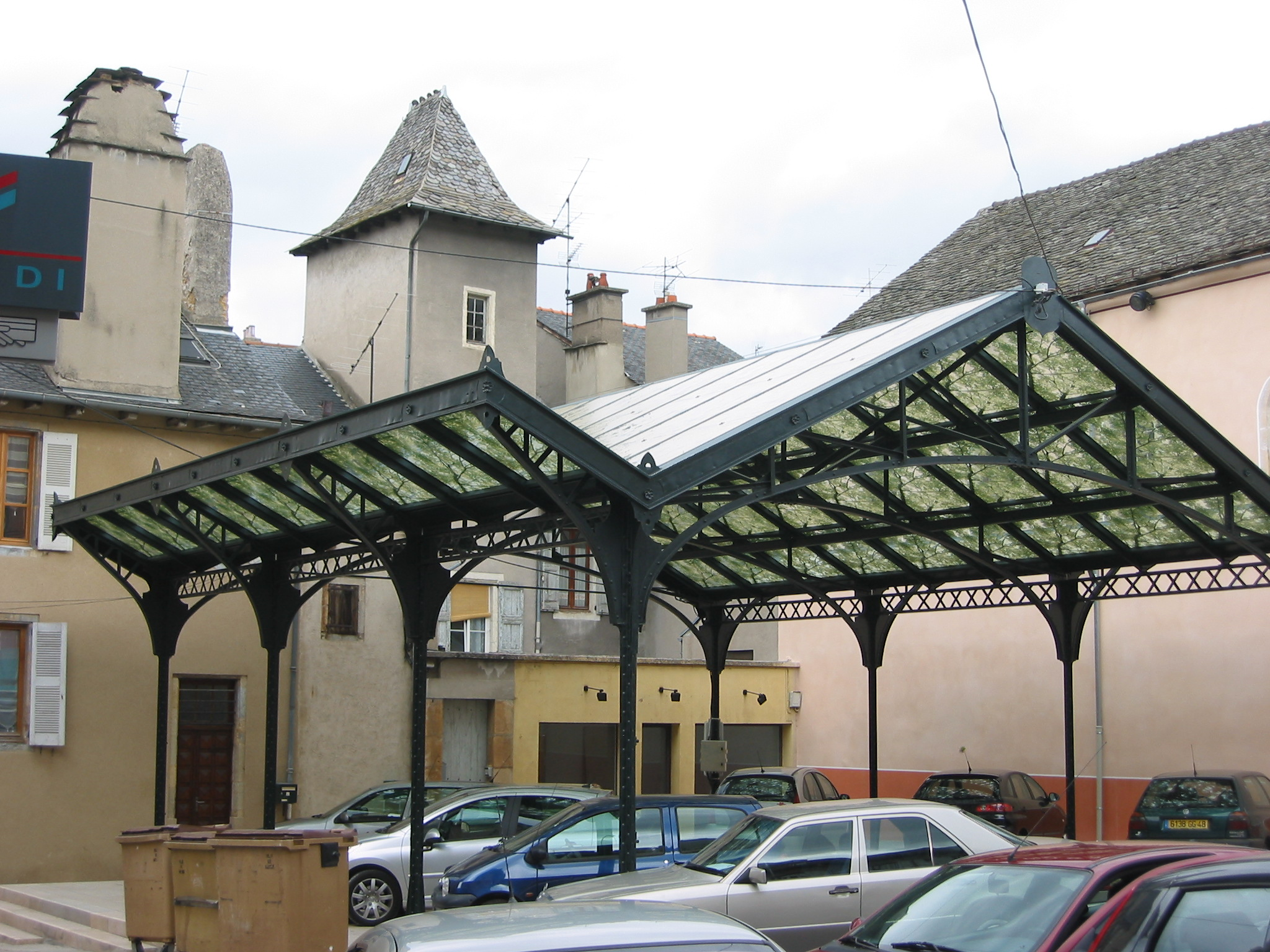
The Place aux Blés

The beginning of the 17th century was coloured by the work of reconstruction of the cathedral for an inauguration in 1605, although work had lasted until 1629. Far from the splendour of the original, while taking up the same plane, this new cathedral was characterised by a bell tower which was smaller than the other.

Between 1645 and 1660, the city was the scene of strife between two rival factions: The Marmaux and the Catharinaux, all members of the consuls or the bourgeoisie, but not having the same opinion on the importance of episcopal power, the latter being opposed. The bishop was also the target of an attack while he officiated in Mende Cathedral in 1645 (he was actually not touched). After several trials, it was not without difficulty that the kingdom gave back his ancestral power, the consul remaining under his control.

At the end of the century, Monsignor Piencourt landscaped a lane which joined to the Lot (since known as "Allée Piencourt") and especially acquired the Aubusson tapestries for the episcopal palace. These tapestries, classified, since adorn the cathedral. It was also behind the early educational development in the city and contributed to the building of the hospital. It also made the hospital its heir, allowing it to develop.

In 1702, the war of the Camisards was triggered in the Cévennes. Mende somewhat landscaped its walls in order to prevent any attack. However, this war which began with the murder of Father du Chayla at Le Pont-de-Montvert never reached Mende.

In 1721, the Great Plague arrived in Gévaudan affecting the town of Mende with an amount of 1,078 victims in one year. Two generations later, the walls were removed (in 1768), "so the air circulates better".

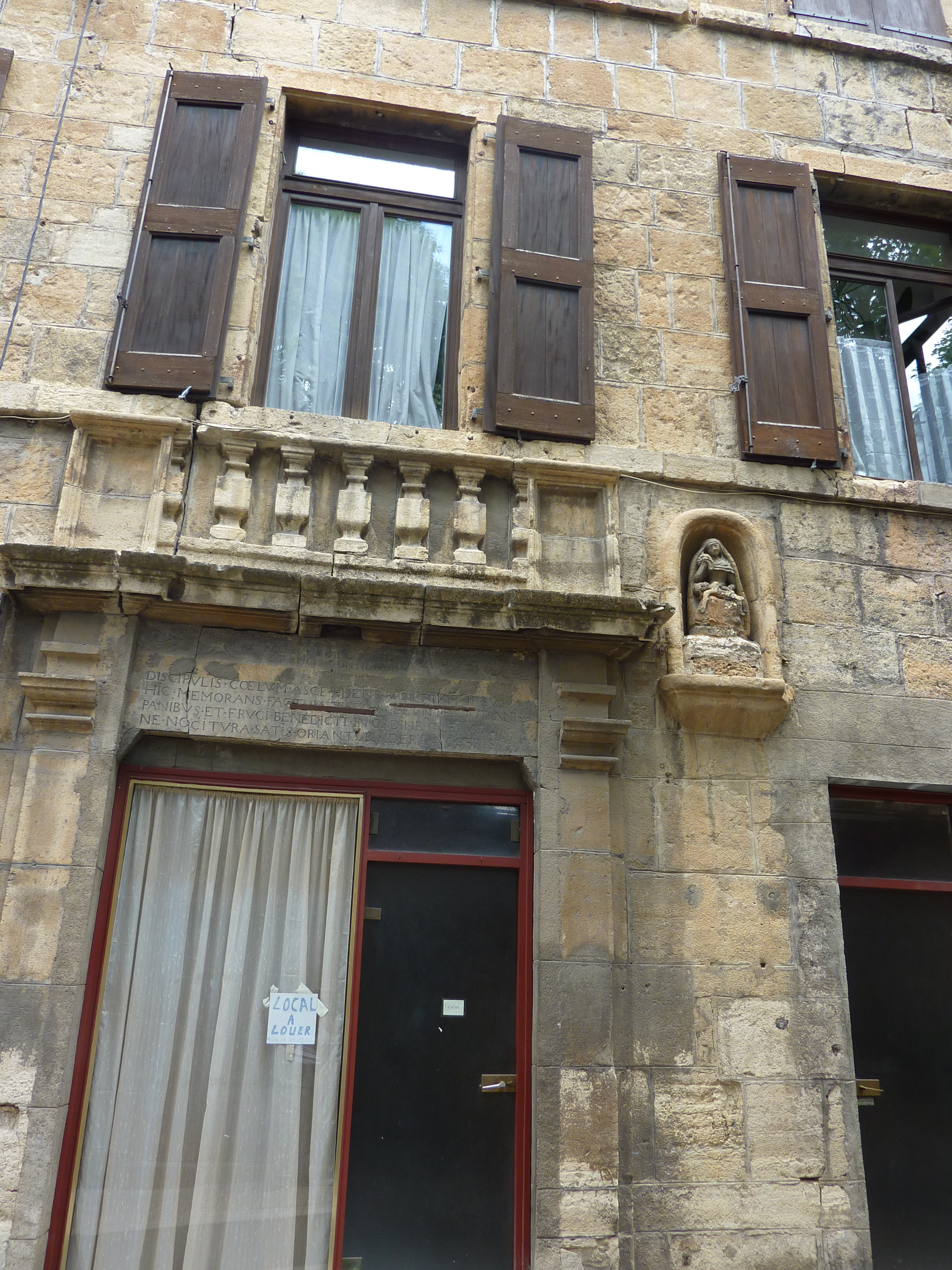
A house of the 17th century called "Maison de Mandrin" with false balusters beneath the windows.

Once all these troubles passed, the city redeveloped its economy around wool and sheep farming. The city extended a little bit under the development of the appearance of the mills, and its first factory. In 1754, Mende saw Louis Mandrin the famous brigand, who lodged in a house there and, according to legend, hid treasure.

Between 1764 and 1767, Mende was the witness the comings and goings of the wolf-hunters of the king, who came to seek rest in the city before returning to hunt the beast which was terrorising the north of the country. It was seen close to Mende, once at Pailhou and between Rieutort-de-Randon and Chastel-Nouvel but remained primarily in Margeride. At this time the quarrel between the consul and the bishop was brought up to date by the edict on municipal organizations. The burghers and nobles opposed, but the bishop finally retained power in 1771.

During the French Revolution, Mende had to share with Marvejols the function of department capital of Gévaudan. This was renamed in the Lozère department in 1790, and the guardianship of the church disappeared in 1791, thus putting an end to the paréage of 1307. Mende was the scene of small counter-revolutionary clashes, but without great effects. It became the sole capital shortly after.

=== Since the 19th century ===
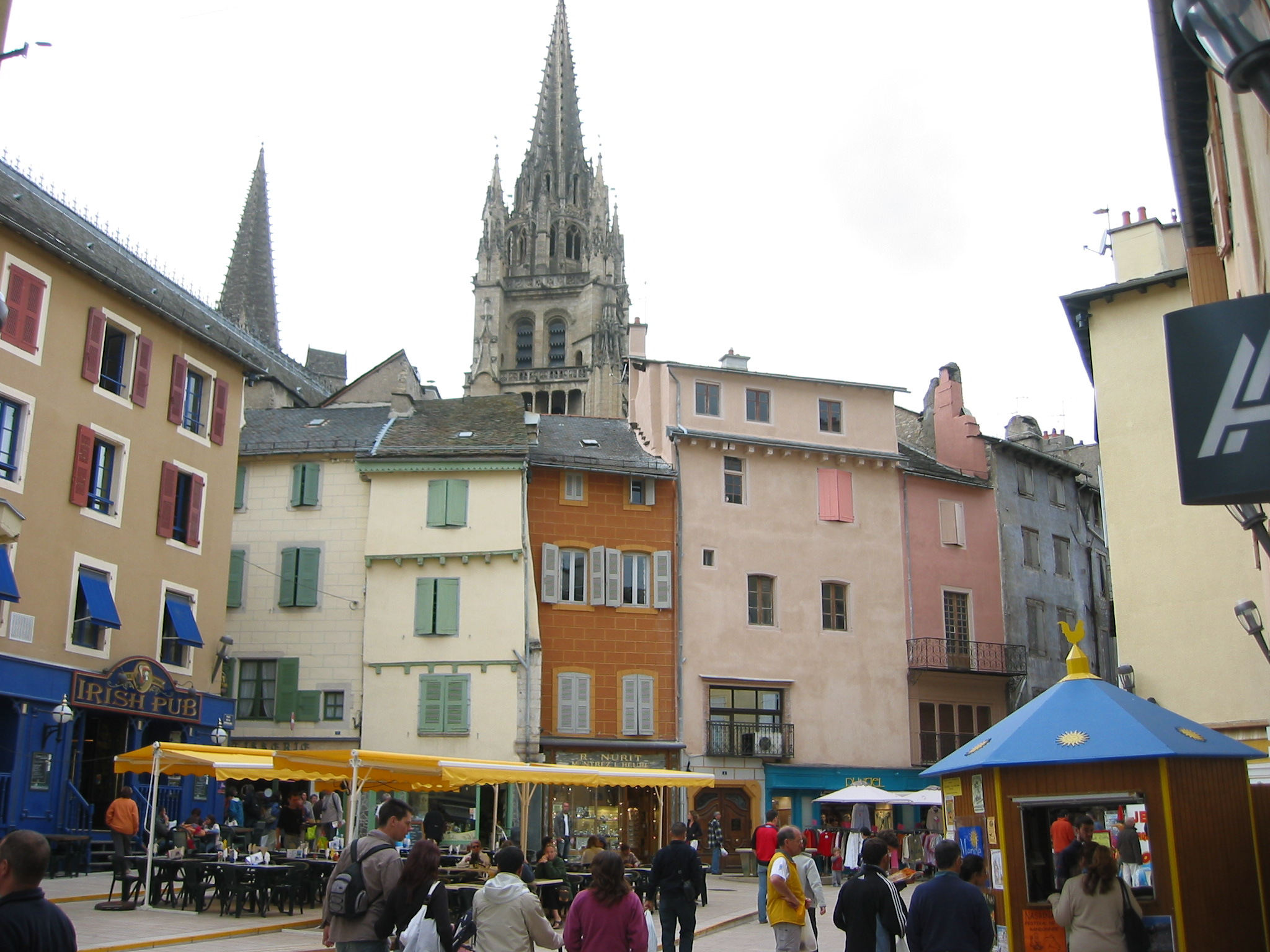
The Place de la République

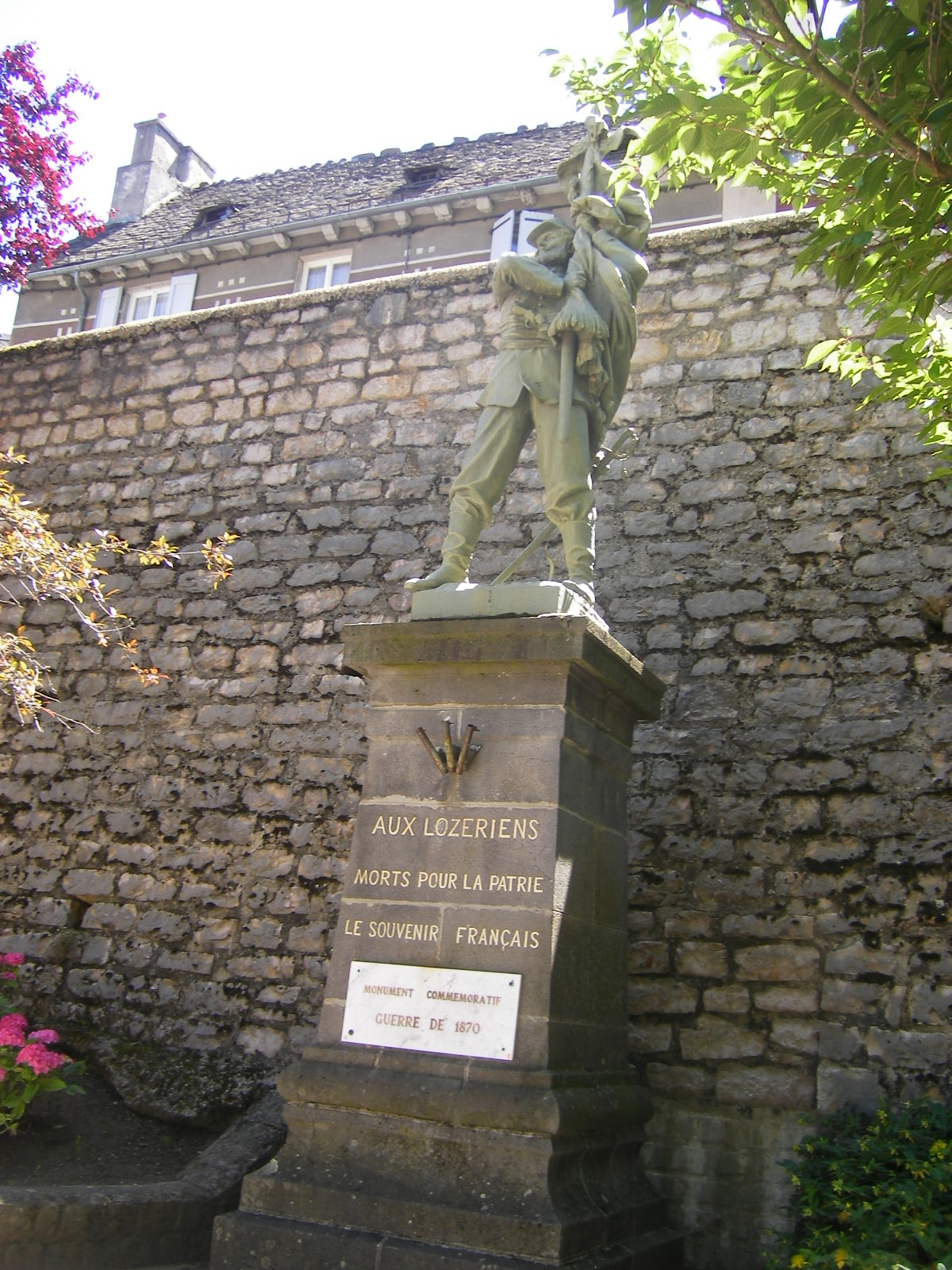
War memorial of 1870

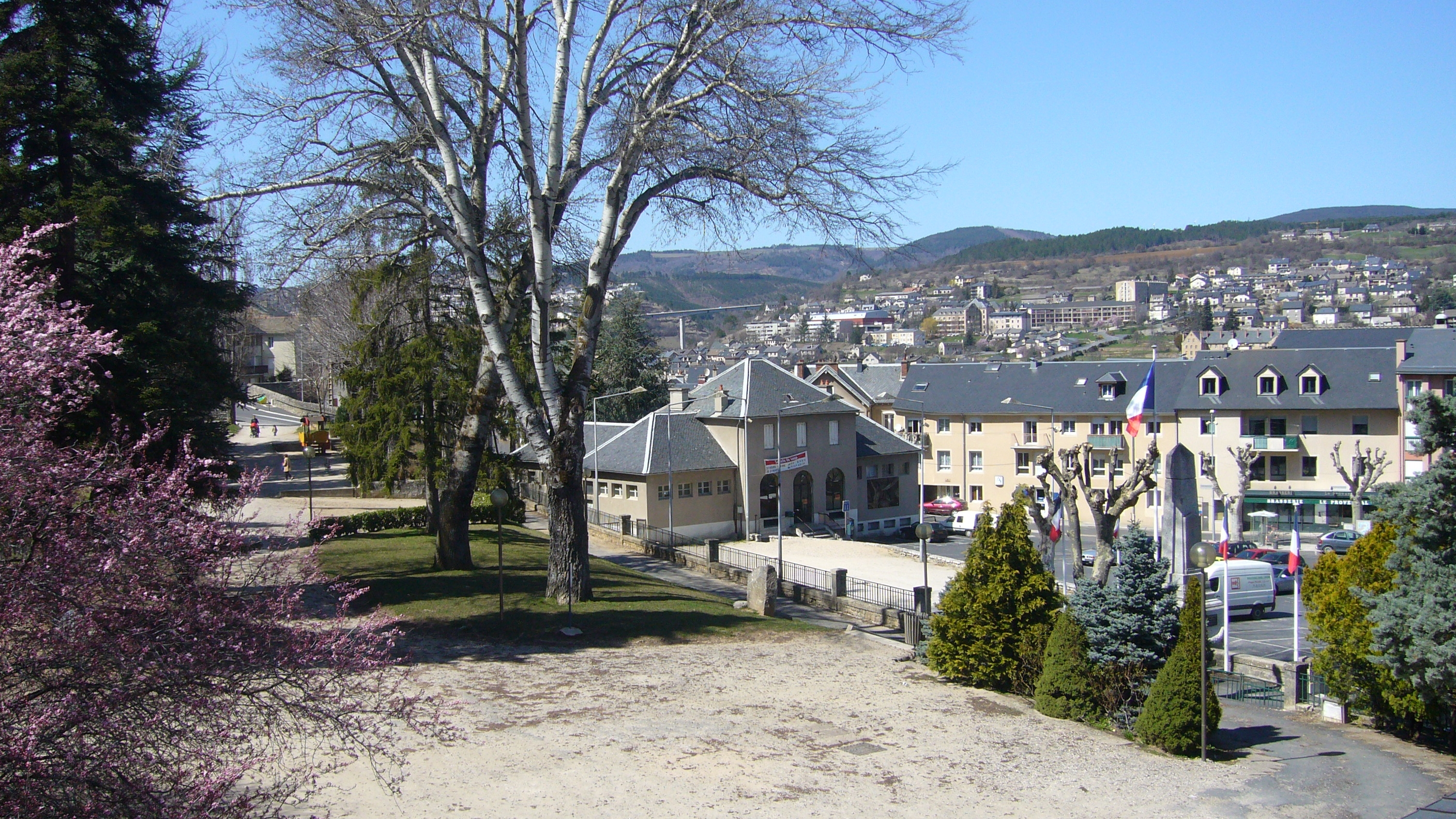
The Émile-Joly Square, the Saint-Ilpide home, and the Rieucros Viaduct and the hospital in the background

In 1800, the prefect settled in the city, and the prefecture occupies the episcopal palace after the sale of the property of the church. In the middle of the 19th century, the causses around Mende are planted with Austrian black pine, this national forest has continued since then. The choice of black pine was due to its ease of acclimation, and its robustness. The presence of this forest often protected Mende from floods.

Then the railway appeared in the prefecture, then linking to Sévérac-le-Château (3 May 1884). The railway line follows the Lot to cross the city, and also continues to follow, like the newly created road. In 1887 the old episcopal palace disappeared in flames, the prefecture had to be rebuilt.

On 8 April 1888 Mende became one of the first cities in France, and the first chef-lieu to have electric lighting. The plant was installed in the old Hôtel de Ressouches.

The twentieth century was marked by a beginning of economic decline. The gradual end of the wool industry, the First and the Second World War depopulated the city. Between 1931 and 1934 baths are built, since becoming the Saint Ilpide Home, and located on the market square. The building was destroyed in summer 2013, to be replaced by a multi-cultural hall.

In 1939, shortly before World War II, an internment camp was built in the woods of the Rieucros. The population was opposed to this transit camp for anti-fascists and communists. It then became an internment camp exclusively for women. The mayor at the time, Henri Bourrillon, condemned the Vichy regime and the camp in his hometown, where he made sure that children interned with their mother followed a normal education. His hostile words and acts to the regime in place led him to be removed from his post in 1941. He then joined Resistance where he became one of the leaders for the Lozère. Arrested and sent to German camps in 1944, he died during a transfer in 1945.

Ideally placed between the Maquis of the Cévennes and the Aubrac, the town was located as well as a centre for the coordination of the Lozère Interior Resistance. As for the population, it protected itself Place Urbain V where shelters against aerial bombardments were implemented.

From the 1970s, the city had a sizable population growth. The city then extended to the Causse d'Auge. In the 1980s and 1990s, one can also see that the department was depopulating overall, while its prefecture was expanding. Culture and sport took more importance in the life of the city.

During the 1990s, the city developed administrative reconciliations with nearby cities. Therefore, it formed the Estelle city network with Aurillac and Rodez. The principle of the network was to share experiences and pool resources to develop such medium-sized cities. Shortly after, it was with other networks that Mende became closer to other cities of the Massif Central. This is the case, for example, with the Cyber Massif network dedicated to the digital opening up of the region.

Moreover, since the beginning of the 21st century, Mende had tried to actively participate in the policies of opening up of the Massif Central. The city lies in the Lot Valley and reached an area of 37 square kilometres (14 sq mi) in the 2000s. It also seeks to enroll in a sustainable development project, in the image of the department with, among other projects, the construction of a cogeneration plant and the establishment of a network of heat. The timber industry, so important in the economy of the city, could therefore be put to further use. The establishment of bio-energy in the city has also been carried out by the appearance of a wind farm north of the city.

== Politics and administration ==
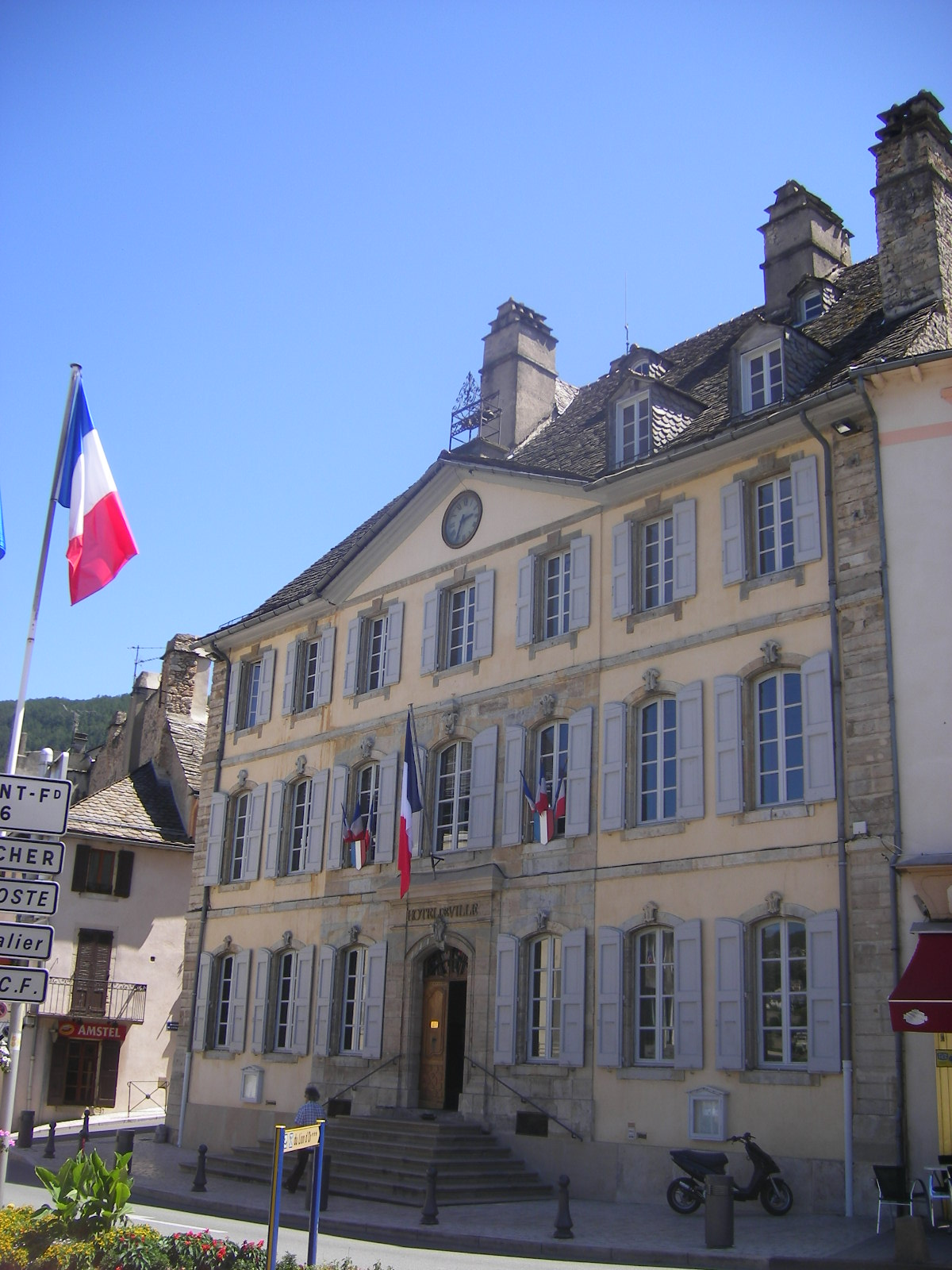
The town hall

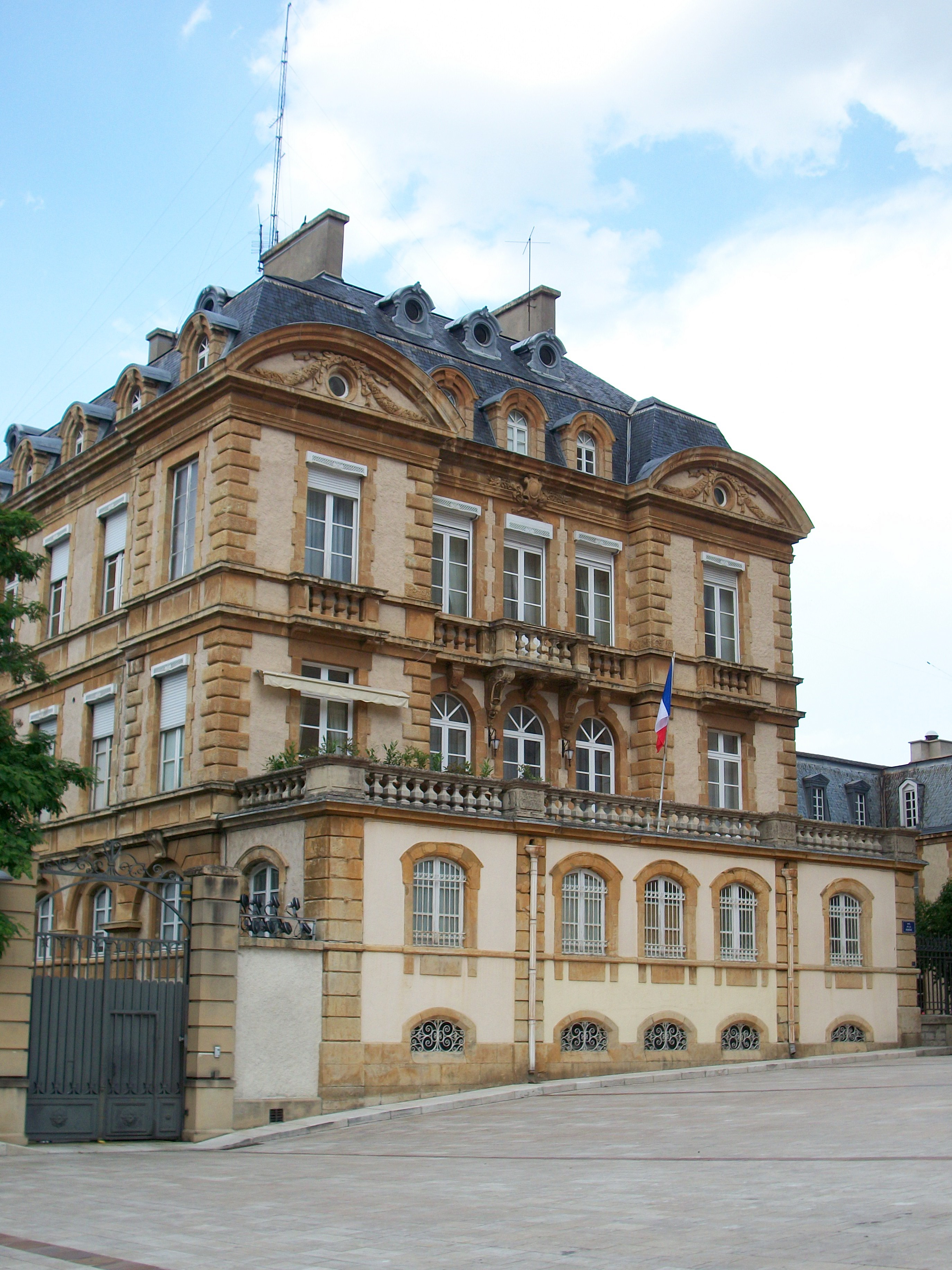
Prefecture and headquarters of the General Council of Lozère

Mende is the chef-lieu of the Lozère department: It welcomes in this regard the prefecture and the headquarters of the General Council. The buildings of these two institutions are scattered within the city. A project of the Department Hall to consolidate all services of the General Council is under consideration. The mayor's office is housed in the town hall which dates from the 18th century, however, a large part of the services have been moved to the annex of the mayor's office.

=== City hall ===
This is the old consular house which was used as a city hall of the Revolution until 1852. On that date, Mayor Becamel bought the Pages family mansion located in the Place d'Angiran. Since then the city hall has been based in this city mansion (listed historical monument) in the square which has become Place Charles-de-Gaulle, although a part of the services is now located in the annex which faces it. As the cathedral, the city hall also houses the tapestries of Aubusson, classified since 1909.

=== List of mayors ===
Since 1945, the following were elected mayors of the city of Mende:

List of mayors of Mende
Start	End	Name	Party	Other details
29 April 1945	6 February 1956 (resigned)	Jean Mazel		Jurist
1956	1971	René Estoup		
1971	1977	Henri Trémolet de Villers	CNIP	Lawyer
March 1977	1983	Pierre Couderc	RI	Medical doctor
14 March 1983	2008	Jean-Jacques Delmas	DVD (Note: Although affiliated with the UDF, has always presented to the municipality under the abel Miscellaneous right)	Medical doctor Député of Lozère (1993-1997); Councillor general (1970-2010)
March 2008	In progress	Alain Bertrand	PS	Inspector of the Domains; Regional councillor (1998-2011); Senator of Lozère since 2011

=== Intercommunality ===
The city of Mende belongs to the Cœur de Lozère Community of Communes. It was created in December 2001 under the name of Communauté de communes de la Haute Vallée d'Olt before changing its name in 2009. The commune being the largest in terms of population, it was its mayor, Jean-Jacques Delmas, who became the first president of the community.

The implementation of this community of communes has allowed a transfer of powers. So, all areas of economic activity and sports facilities now fall under the responsibility of the community, rather than the commune itself.

However, the actions are much wider since waste treatment also enters the competence of the community. The waste disposal site of the commune lies in the ZAE du Causse d'Auge, north of the city. In this context, unsorted collection is also the responsibility of the community of communes.

This community of communes is not the only grouping of communities for the town of Mende. A comprehensive plan was implemented around the label Pays d'Art et d'Histoire de Mende et Lot en Gévaudan [Lands of art and history of Mende and Lot in Gevaudan]. These are twenty-two communes which now belong to the Pays d'Art [Lands of Art] which comes in the continuity of the city of art and history label which Mende has had since 1981. The lands comprises four communities: Cœur de Lozère, Goulet-Mont Lozère, Valdonnez and Pays de Chanac, which is assistant to the Chastel-Nouvel commune.

=== Administrative division ===
The city is the chef-lieu of two cantons: Mende-1 and Mende-2 since 2015. Mende-1 comprises the northern part of the city, Mende-2 the southern part.

Representatives	Canton	Canton Code	Population (2017)
Régine Bourgade and Laurent Suau	Mende-1	48 09	6,076 inhabitants
Françoise Amarger-Brajon and Jean-Claude Moulin	Mende-2	48 10	6,058 inhabitants

=== Courts ===
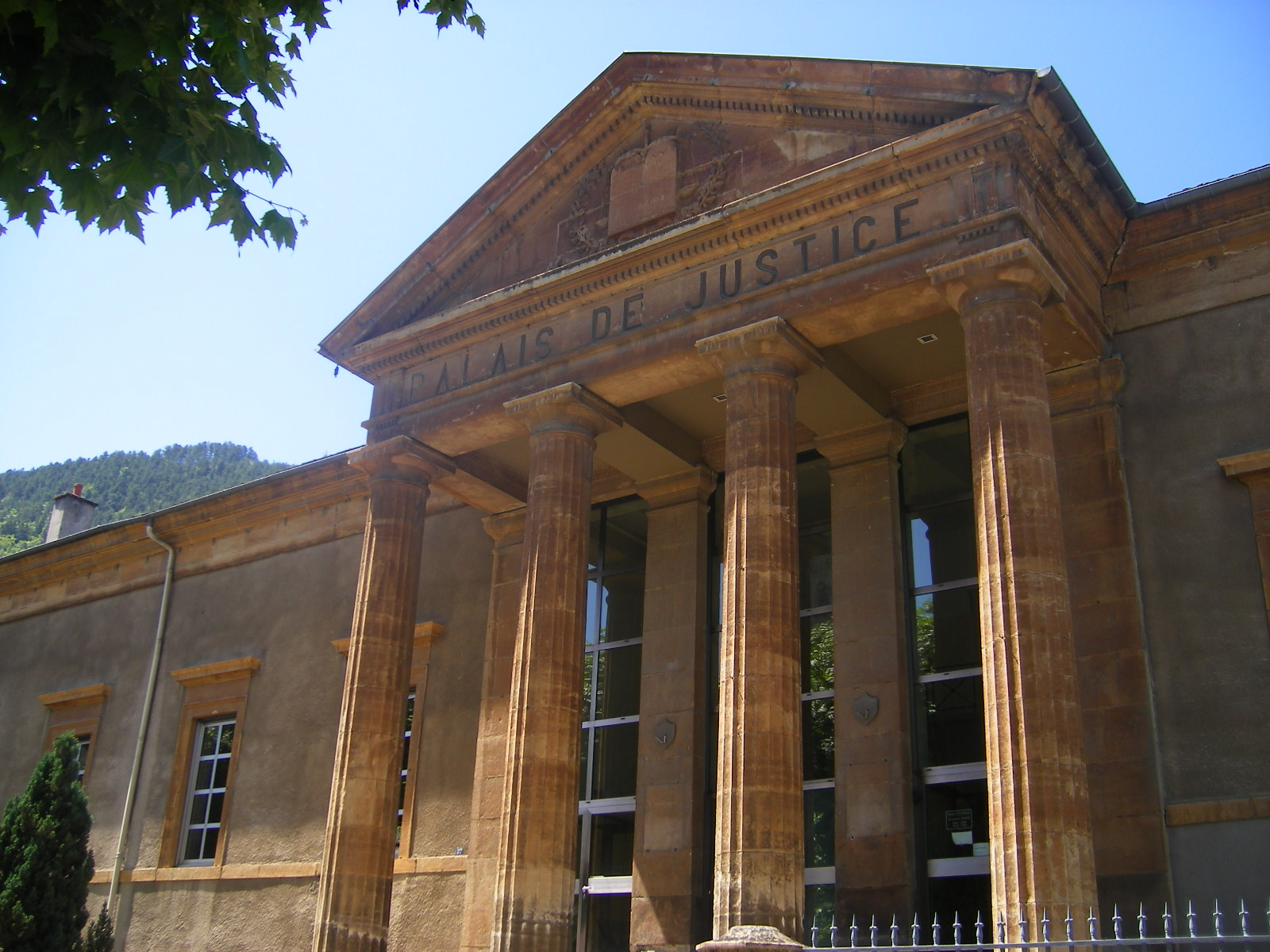
The courthouse

Before the Act of paréage of 1307, Mendoise and Gevaudanaise justice was fully devolved to the bishops. This power was shared with the king after the signing of the Act. Power was shared between the various barons for the communal land, with Mende being in the land of the bishops and Marvejols in lands of the king, and like this until 1789.

The courthouse was built between 1833 and 1835. On 18 February 1994, it was the target of a bombing by the FLNC.

The tribunal groups together a children's tribunal, a tribunal of commerce, a court and a high court. It depends on the Court of appeal of Nîmes.

The city has long held prisons. Current prison was commissioned in 1891. One of the first high-security areas of France was then moved there in 1949. It was at this date that the prison ownership changed, from the State Department. Several personalities have stayed here, the most famous being Jacques Mesrine. André Génovès' film, Mesrine released in 1983, also tells of the criminal plan to destroy the QHS. François Besse had sought to bring Jacques Mesrine out of prison when he was imprisoned in Mende. This area had also been the target of critics, such as those of the Committee of action of prisoners and Serge Livrozet, in 1975. In 1989, the Mende detention centre was again publicised with the escape of Ahmed Otmane, who managed to escape by threatening guards with a dummy gun. The last prison 'personality' of Mende, René Riesel, activist of the Confédération paysanne alongside José Bové, was imprisoned after the case of the McDonald's franchise destruction in Millau.

== Twin towns – sister cities ==
Mende is twinned with:

- Wunsiedel, Germany (1980)
- Volterra, Italy (1993)
- Vila Real, Portugal (2003)

Since 2007, the cities of Wunsiedel and Volterra are also paired together. The twinning with Vila Real (much more populous than the city of Mende) is explained by the fact that a large part of the Portuguese population of Mende, and Lozère in general, is from this region.

== Population and society ==
=== Demographics ===
==== Demographic evolution ====
In contrast to the department of Lozère, the prefecture saw its demographic curve draw increasingly since the French Revolution. If the department was strongly affected by the rural exodus in France and the great wars of the 20th century, the city had the presence of its own authorities. This may explain why Mende has not experienced the same trend as Lozère. This table shows the demographic for the town of Mende, but it can be considered that the bassin Mendois [Mende area] follows the same trend.

Historical population

Year	Pop.	±% p.a.
1793	5,000	—
1800	5,014	+0.04%
1806	5,890	+2.72%
1821	5,370	−0.61%
1831	5,822	+0.81%
1836	5,909	+0.30%
1841	5,440	−1.64%
1846	5,492	+0.19%
1851	6,994	+4.95%
1856	6,877	−0.34%
1861	6,770	−0.31%
1866	6,453	−0.95%
1872	6,906	+1.14%
1876	7,300	+1.40%
1881	7,202	−0.27%
1886	8,033	+2.21%
1891	7,878	−0.39%
1896	7,370	−1.32%
1901	7,319	−0.14%

Year	Pop.	±% p.a.
1906	7,007	−0.87%
1911	7,005	−0.01%
1921	6,109	−1.36%
1926	6,056	−0.17%
1931	6,145	+0.29%
1936	6,499	+1.13%
1946	7,003	+0.75%
1954	7,752	+1.28%
1962	8,337	+0.91%
1968	9,713	+2.58%
1975	10,451	+1.05%
1982	10,929	+0.64%
1990	11,286	+0.40%
1999	11,804	+0.50%
2007	12,153	+0.36%
2012	11,908	−0.41%
2017	12,134	+0.38%
2023	12,464	+0.45%

Source: EHESS and INSEE

==== Age structure ====
Population by age of Mende, 2023 (%)

80+	7.4
65–79	13.9
55–64	13
40–54	18.8
25–39	16.2
15–24	15.5
0–14	15.1

Total: 99.9

male

female

Source: INSEE

Population by age of Lozère, 2023 (%)

90+	8.1
75–89	19.1
60–74	14.7
45–59	19.3
30–44	14.5
15–29	10
0–14	14.3

Total: 100

male

female

Source: INSEE

The Mende population is fairly young taking into account the ageing population of Lozère.

==== Immigration ====
In Mende, the share of the immigrant population represents about 8% of the total population. They originate mostly from Portugal (mainly from Vila Real), Morocco, Algeria, and Turkey. This being the image of immigration in the region. The Spanish immigration, which was very present in the middle of the twentieth century, has been disappearing since the 1970s.

=== Education ===
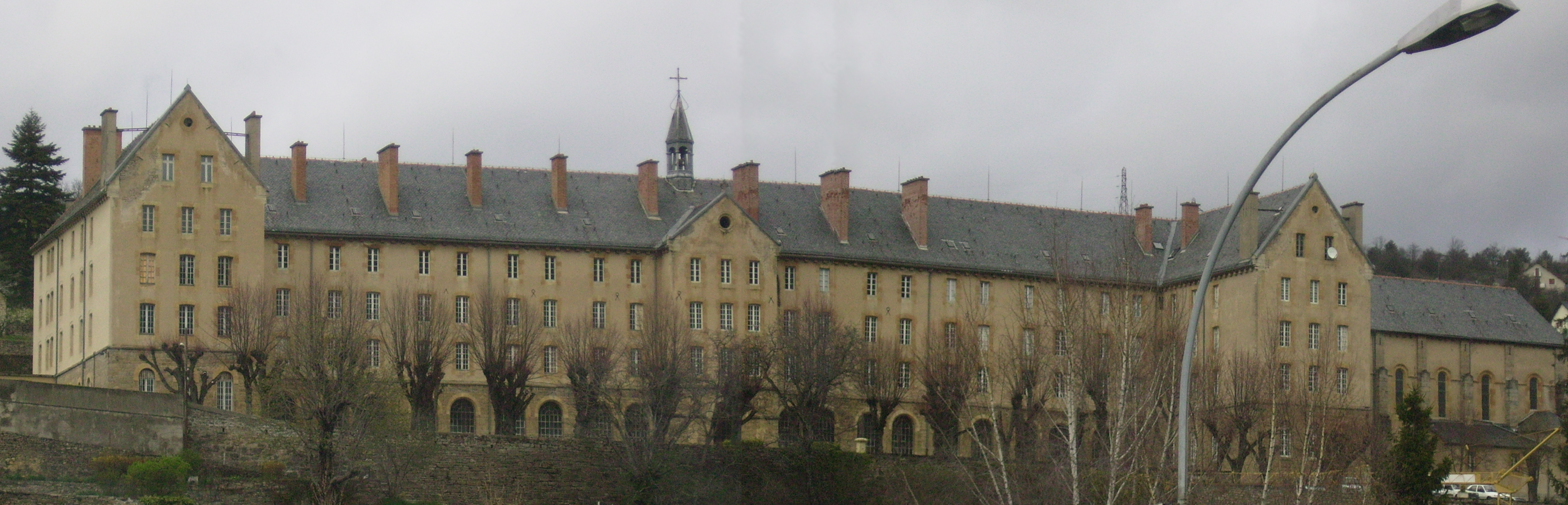
Seminary, which once housed the Plaisance school

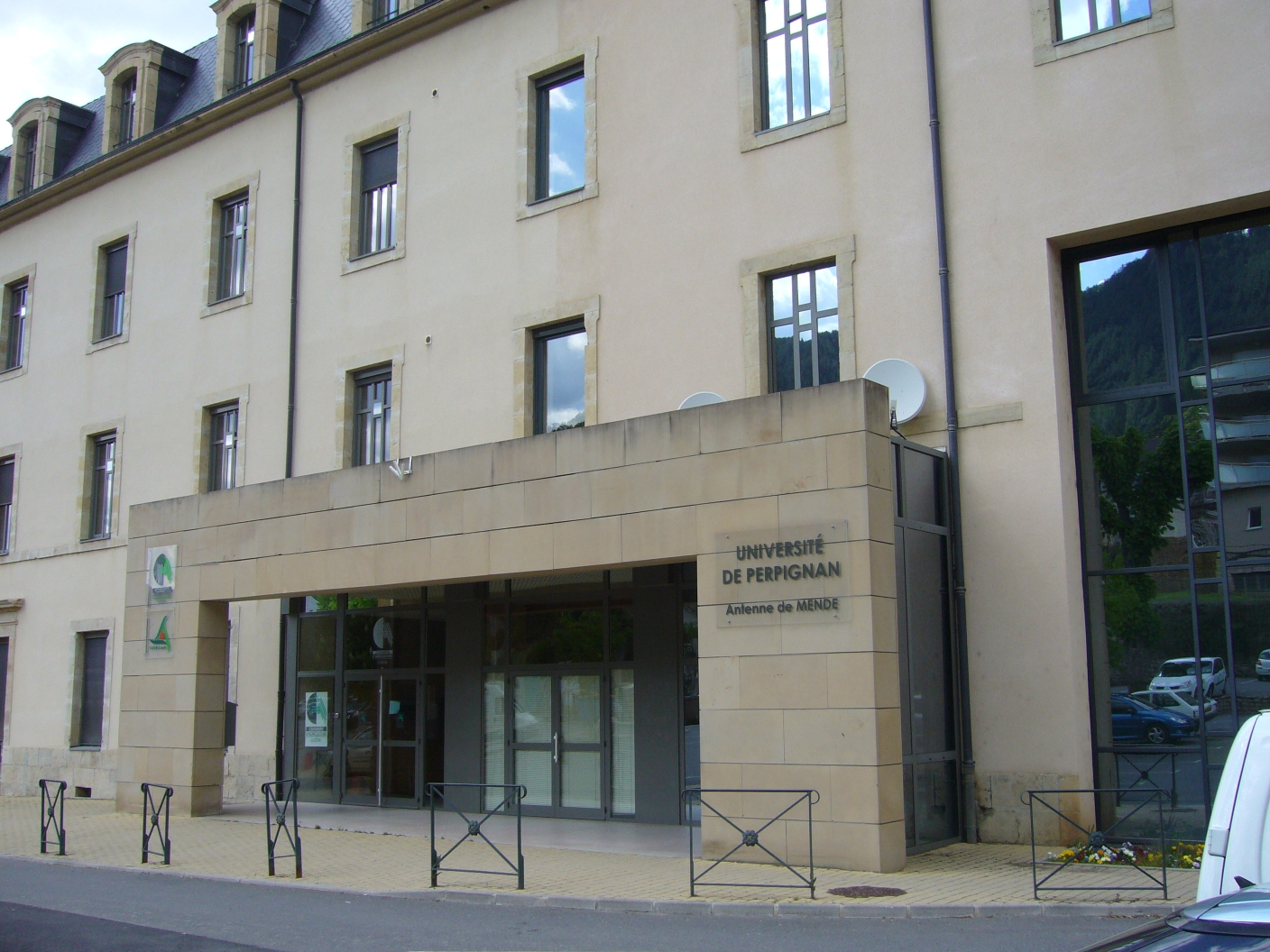
The Jacques Maillot Institute (IUP) branch of the University of Perpignan

Mende has three nursery schools: Solelhons (the small Suns in Occitan), the Chênes school and Fontanilles school. They are in close relations with the primary schools of the Groupe solaire, Annex Michel del Castillo School and Fontanilles School, Jeanne d'Arc School dealing with private education.

The public college of Henri-Bourillon is located in the former small seminary, and share places with the Lycée Chaptal. It hosts students from the city as well as a number from other neighbouring municipalities (Badaroux, Barjac, Chanac, Saint-Bauzile, Saint-Étienne-du-Valdonnez, etc.). The private college is the college of Saint-Privat. The continuity of private education is at the Lycée Notre-Dame. Another high school, the Lycée Emile Peytavin allows, in addition to general education, technical and vocational education. Finally, now attached to the Lycée Notre-Dame, we find the Private Professional Lycée Plaisance.

Institutions of the city are also have one of the best success rates for the Baccalauréat diploma, compared with the other schools in the area, which puts them in the first half best institutions of France.

At the level of higher education, Mende welcomes a BTS in its different high schools. An IUP, branch of the University of Perpignan, offers four courses: Multimedia, gerontology, City Council Secretary, and tourism. It is located in the buildings of the former Lamolle barracks, which had housed the 142nd regiment of infanterie. Finally the city also houses a teacher training Institute, an Institute for training in nursing (IFSIL), a Centre de formation d'apprentis and a Greta.

Schools :
Kindergartens; École de Fontanilles; Groupe Scolaire (Solelhons); École des chênes; Écoles publiques; École de Chabrits; École des Tilleuls; École de Fontanilles; Groupe Scolaire; École Michel del Castillo	Private schools; École Jeanne d'Arc; École Saint-Joseph; Collège public; Collège Henri Bourrillon; Collège privé; Collège Saint-Privat	Public high schools of general education; Lycée Jean-Antoine Chaptal; Lycée Émile-Peytavin; Lycée privé d'enseignement général; Lycée Notre-Dame; Lycée professionnel et technique public; Lycée Émile-Peytavin; Lycée professionnel privé; Lycée Notre-Dame

=== Cultural events and festivities ===
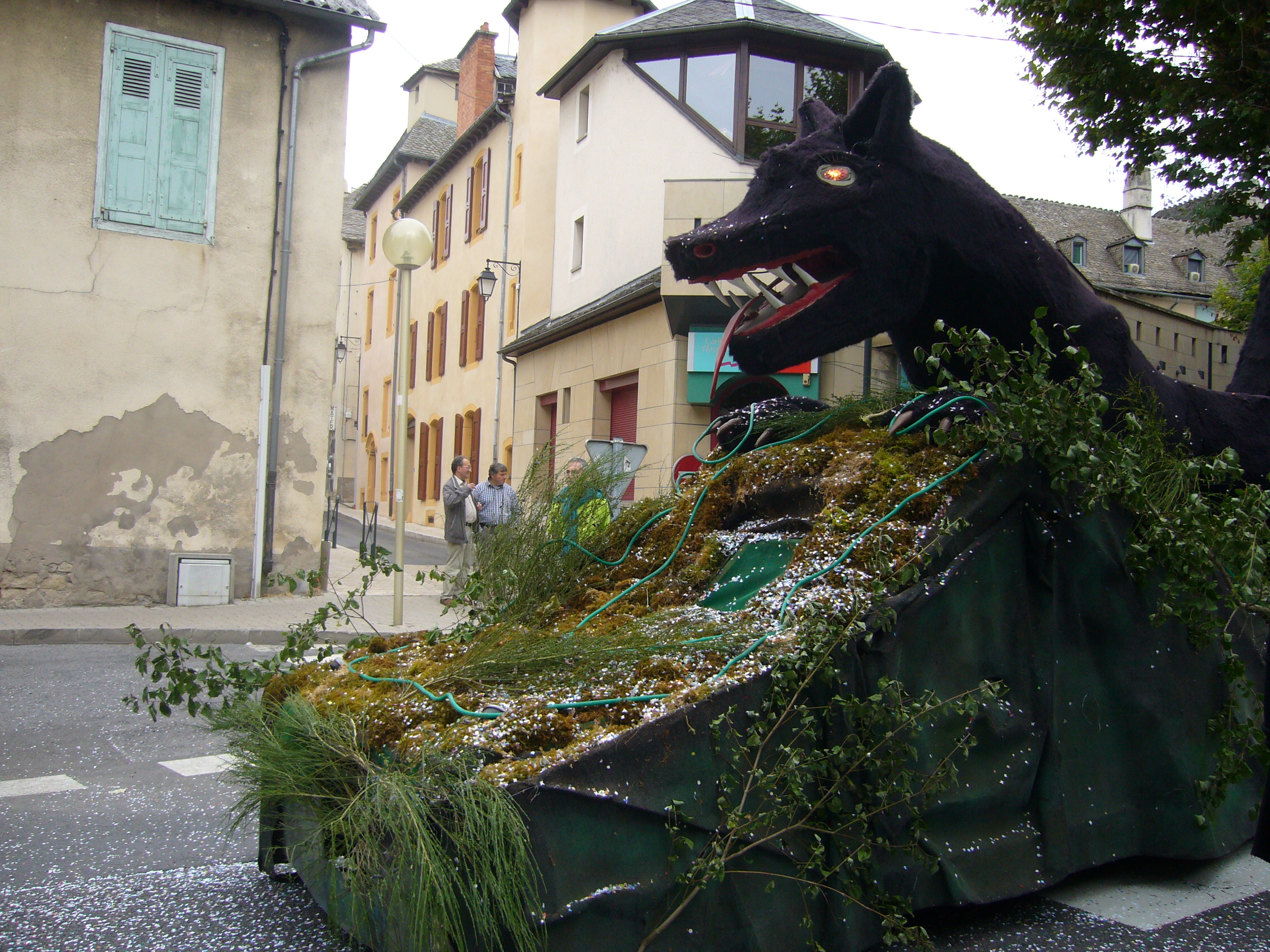
The chariot of the Beast of Gévaudan opens the flower parade of the great feasts of Mende, each year

The festivities of the town of Mende are held annually in the month of August. They were related to the feast of Saint Privat, on 21 August. They are decorated with a flower parade and the election of "Miss Mende". Then, in September, every other year, Mende hosts its beer festival, with its twin town of Wunsiedel. The city has also several sports events. At the cultural level, the "meetings of writers" were organized at the beginning of the 1990s, in August. They have welcomed regional authors but also renowned authors such as Calixthe Beyala and Michel Folco.

=== Health ===
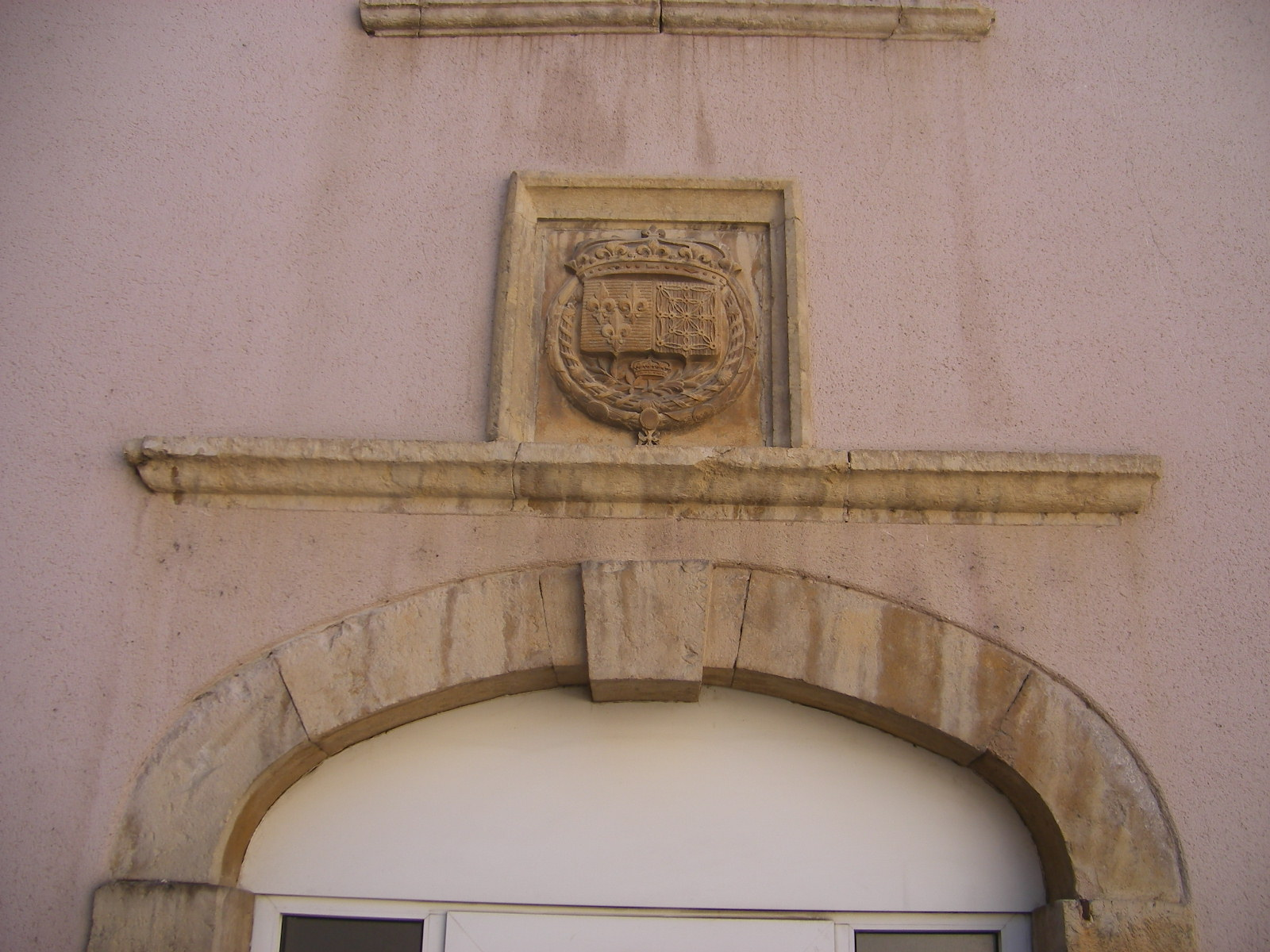
The arms of France and Navarre on one of the gates to the old Piencourt hospital

The department has a hospital, which opened in 1970. Five of the six services are located in Mende: Guy de Chauliac Hospital, the retirement home, the convalescence centre, the Training Institute in Nursing and boarding school. The sixth branch, another retirement home, is based at Rieutort-de-Randon.

The hospital has approximately 70 physicians and 750 health professionals. Moreover, since 2011, it welcomes in its structure the home of the Paul Éluard psychological and psychiatric unit, a branch of the Centre hospitalier François-Tosquelles of Saint-Alban-sur-Limagnole.

To this one can add 20 physicians, general practitioners and specialists as well as a centre of firefighters. Though, if the implementation of the current hospital is fairly recent, the city has a fairly old hospital story.

In the 12th century was the "alms house" for the population. This hospital, located on Rue Angiran, derived its income from the operation of a mill in the district of La Vernède, as well as donations of the lords of the lands. It was partially destroyed in 1593 during the construction of a nearby citadel. Though the citadel disappeared in 1597, the hospital was not repaired immediately. From 1635 a budget was allocated for the rebuilding of the institution. It would not be built in the same place, and would take the name of "Hospital of Aygues-Passes". In 1677 François-Placide de Baudry de Piencourt became Bishop of Mende and thus Count of Gévaudan. In his first year as bishop, he rebuilt a new hospital which became the "general hospital". In 1702 it enlarged, and at his death he bequeathed it all of his possessions. This hospital, today the Piencourt residence, remained in use until the inauguration of the hospital. Added to this hospital, two establishments existed following periods of epidemics, both which were outside the city. A plague centre, referred to as 'House of God', was established in the district of Janicot. At the Saint-Jean Bridge (now Pont-Roupt), a maladrerie was rebuilt in 1242, intended for the accommodation of lepers.

=== Sports ===
Mende is, by its number of licensees and all events, a sports town. Therefore, she was elected twice the sportiest city of France by the daily newspaper L'Équipe (1988 and 1998) and a finalist in 2011. It is one of only a few cities of France to have achieved this distinction twice.

==== Facilities ====
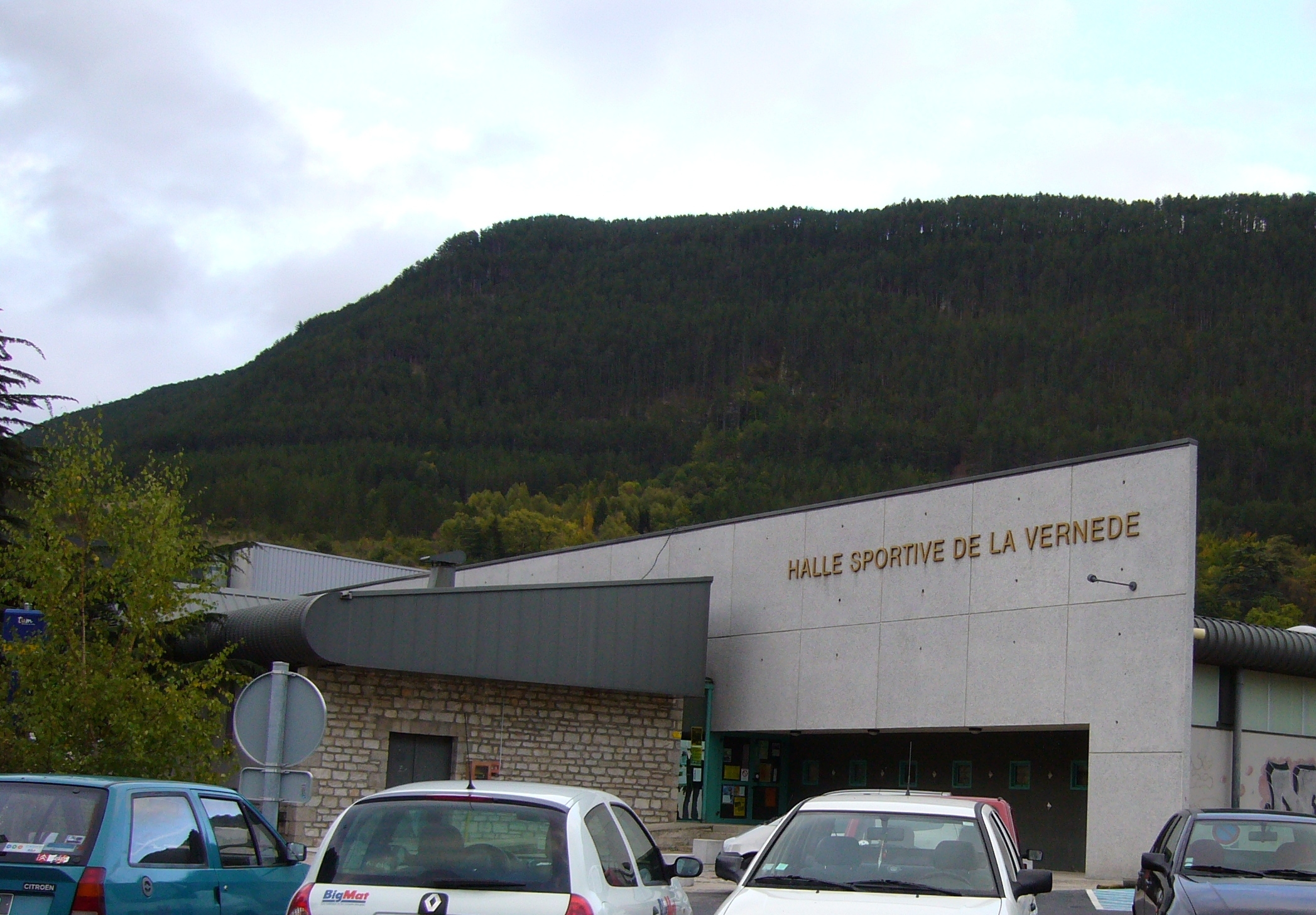
Vernède sports hall (partly for bowling)

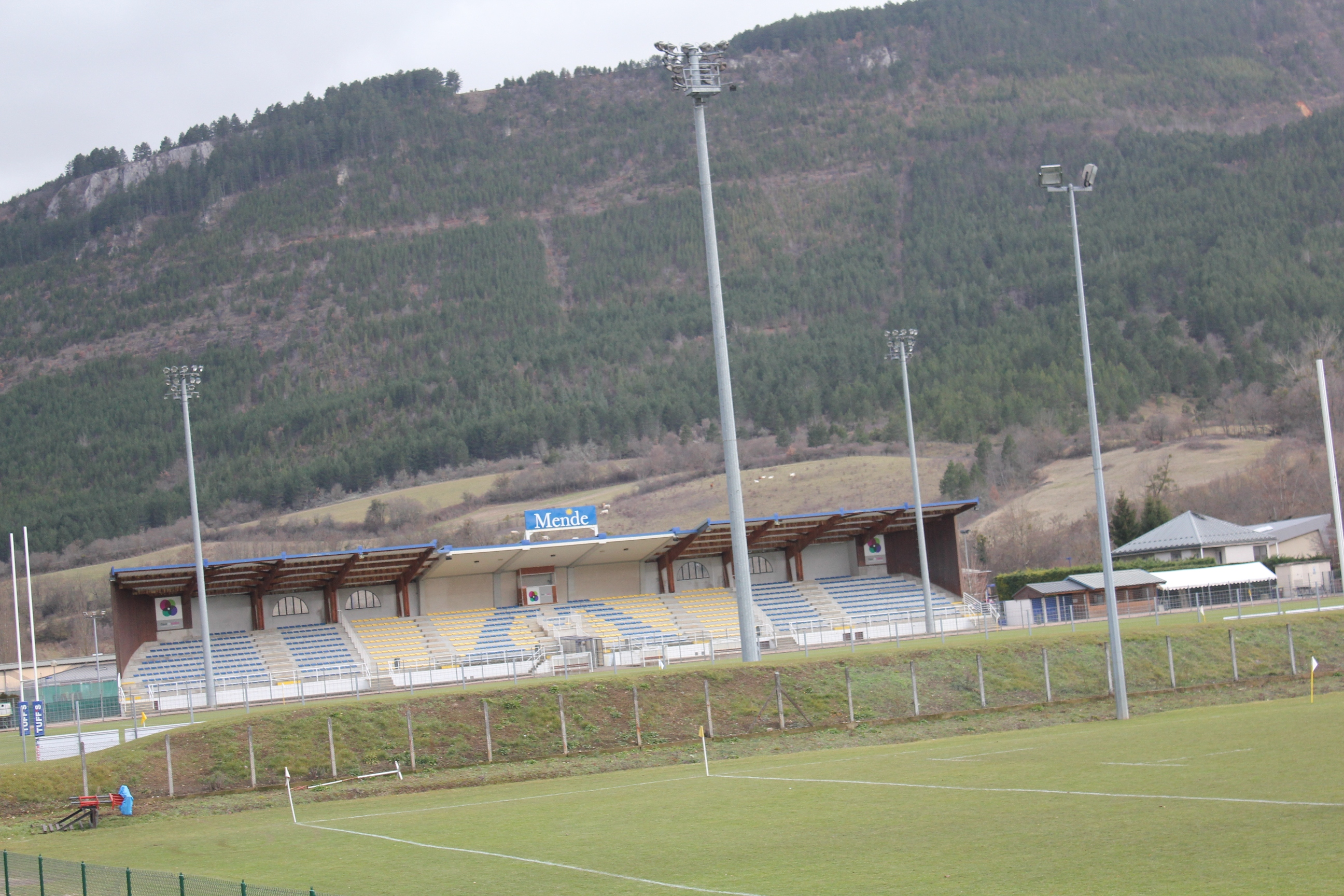
The Jean-Jacques Delmas Stadium

Mende features a sports zone known as the Complexe sportif de Jean Jacques Delmas [Sports complex of Jean Jacques Delmas], in honour of his death, having been originally of this project he was the mayor of Mende for 25 years. There are 3 football/rugby pitches (the Stade du Chapitre and 2 training grounds), the semi-Olympic Marceau Crespin pool, tennis courts, a fitness room, a skate-park, a street-ball court, table-tennis hall and archery/shooting. It is in this complex which the '"Festival of sport" takes place every two years. Chapitre Stadium, enlarged at the Mediterranean Games has 500 seats, but this figure may be largely surpassed during some matches.

Installed on the causse d'Auge are three soccer/rugby fields and an athletics track, which came to replace the old track of Mirandol. The Stade de Mirandol had the municipal stadium office until the 1980s. Since 2006, an equestrian centre is also located on the causse, it comes in addition to the aging Sirvens centre located at the exit of the city. Finally, the causse d'Auge was the chosen site, in 2008, for the construction of a new gymnasium, opposite the football fields.

Mont Mimat offers a freestyle park, many hiking, mountain biking and running trails, a jogging track and a football field. On the Lot, since 1983, a canoe base has been developed in order to practice several water sports.

Near the Chaptal Lycée and the Henri Bourrillon College is the La Vernède complex. In this area are two gymnasiums, a dojo, a gymnastics Hall, one dance, one climbing (over an area outdoors), a covered petanque pitch and one outdoors. Before the construction of the gymnasium of La Vernède, this place was that of the municipal swimming pool and two tennis courts.

Close to other educational institutions, other gyms are installed. There are six in all in the city: La Vernède, Lycée Notre-Dame, Piencourt, Lycée Chaptal, Lycée Théophile Roussel and college Saint-Privat.

Sports grounds of Mende
Name	Capacity	Main sports
Stade Jean-Jacques-Delmas	1,500	Football, rugby
Gymnase de la Vernède	585	Handball
Gymnase Piencourt	350	Volleyball
Gymnase du Lycée Chaptal	N/A	Basketball

==== Sports clubs ====
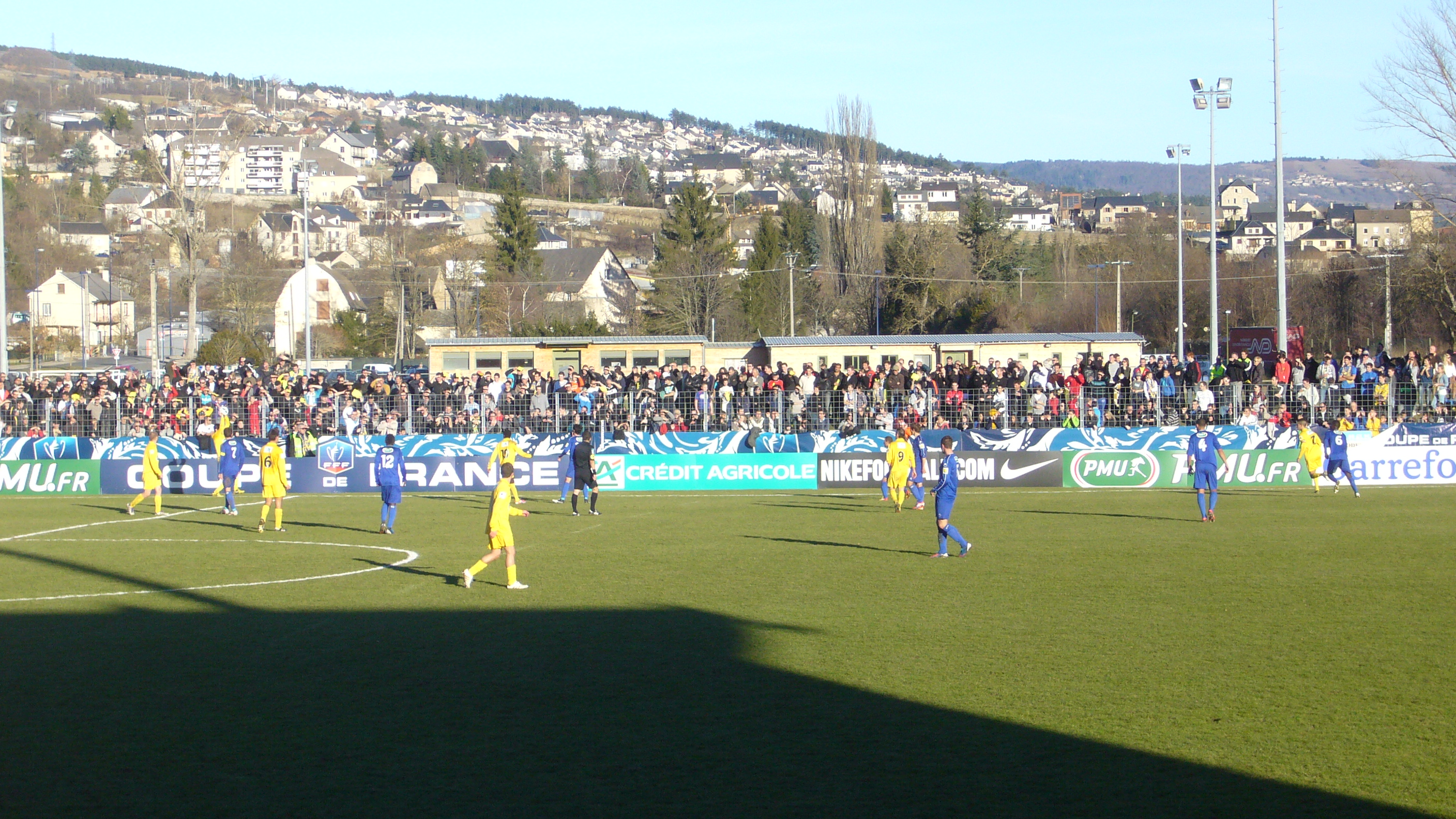
The Round of 32 of the Coupe de France from 2012 to 2013 between AF Lozère and AC Arles-Avignon.

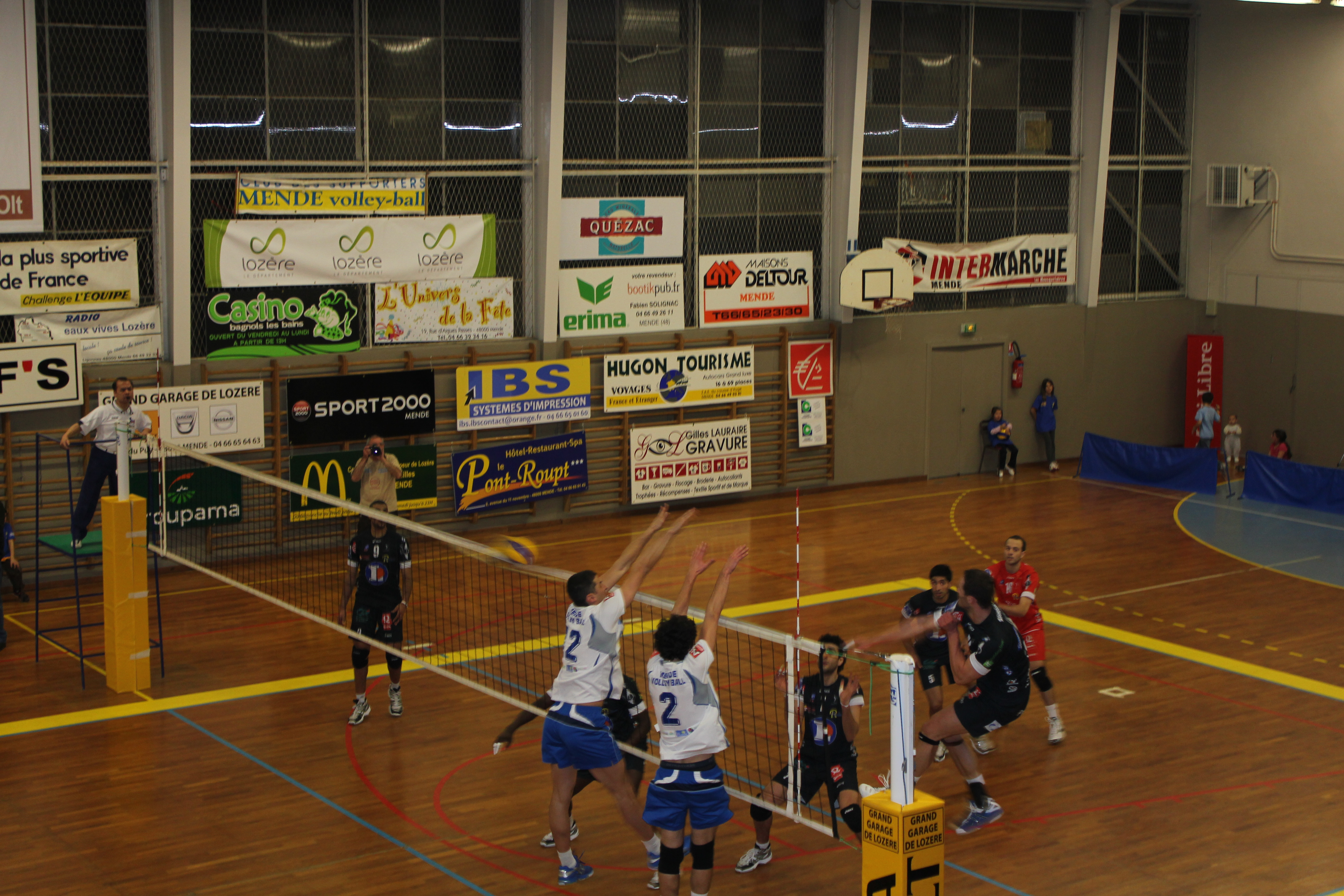
Round of 16 finals of the Coupe de France Volleyball 2010-2011 between VB Mende and VB Tours

Many clubs share the facilities of the city. Football club Éveil Mendois evolved in CFA2 during two seasons (2000–01 and 2001–02), its successor, AF Lozère, plays in the Division d'honneur (6th division). The Éveil Mendois football club came from the omnisports club of the same name, founded in 1920. One of the highlights of its history remains a finish in the last 32 of Coupe de France final played opposite Angoulême on 24 January 1999. More recently, Mende moved up to the last 16 of the finals at the 2013 Coupe de France, winning on this occasion the "ranking of the Petits Poucets".

The key club is the Mende Volley Lozère (formerly Mende Volley Ball) which plays in the Elite division, for the season 2014-2014 (3rd national division). At the top level, the MVL has a title of champion of France of N3 obtained at the end of the 2008-2009 season and a participation in the third round of the 2010-2011 Coupe de France.

Of Rugby union (Rugby Club Mende Lozère), it found its place in Fédérale 3 in 2006, but returned to the regional level in the 2010s. The club however already evolved to a higher level a few years previously.

The handball team (Mende Gévaudan Club) is evolving in 2014-2015 in the National 3 France Championship. Finally, the basketball team (basketball Causses Mendois) was found in 2014-2015 at the regional level. For women there are also handball, volleyball and basketball clubs which are Mendois clubs of highest level.

Mende can be granted a special status to orienteering, an individual sport with team competitions. The fact remains that Mende is playing in the elite league of France, and M. G. C. Pétanque and its three veteran champions of France in 2007.

Sports diversity does not stop there. Mende clubs also include roller hockey (Les Comets). Mende is also home to individual sports: Athletics, badminton, cycling, motorcycling, as well as many combat sports clubs.

Since the beginning of the 2000s, a sports centre was set up to accompany young high school athletes to prepare for the best level. From the membership of the COL (centre omnisports Lozère), there is Romain Paulhan (France MTB 2010 downhill champion) and Fanny Lombard (Junior Champion of Europe 2009 and 2010 in the same discipline).

Team sports in Mende
Sport	Name of club	Championship 2014-2015	Division 2014-2015
Men's Basketball	Basket Causses Mendois	Région masculine III	8
Women's Basketball	Basket Causses Mendois	Région féminine II	7
Men's Handball	Mende Gévaudan Club	Nationale 3	5
Women's Handball	Mende Gévaudan Club	Région I	6
Men's Football	AF Lozère	Division d'Honneur	6
Women's Football	Entente Gévaudan	Départemental	6
Men's Rugby	Rugby Club Mende Lozère	Honneur régionale	6
Men's Volleyball	Mende Volley Lozère	Elite	3
Women's Volleyball	Mende Volley Lozère	Région féminine	6

==== Top athletes ====
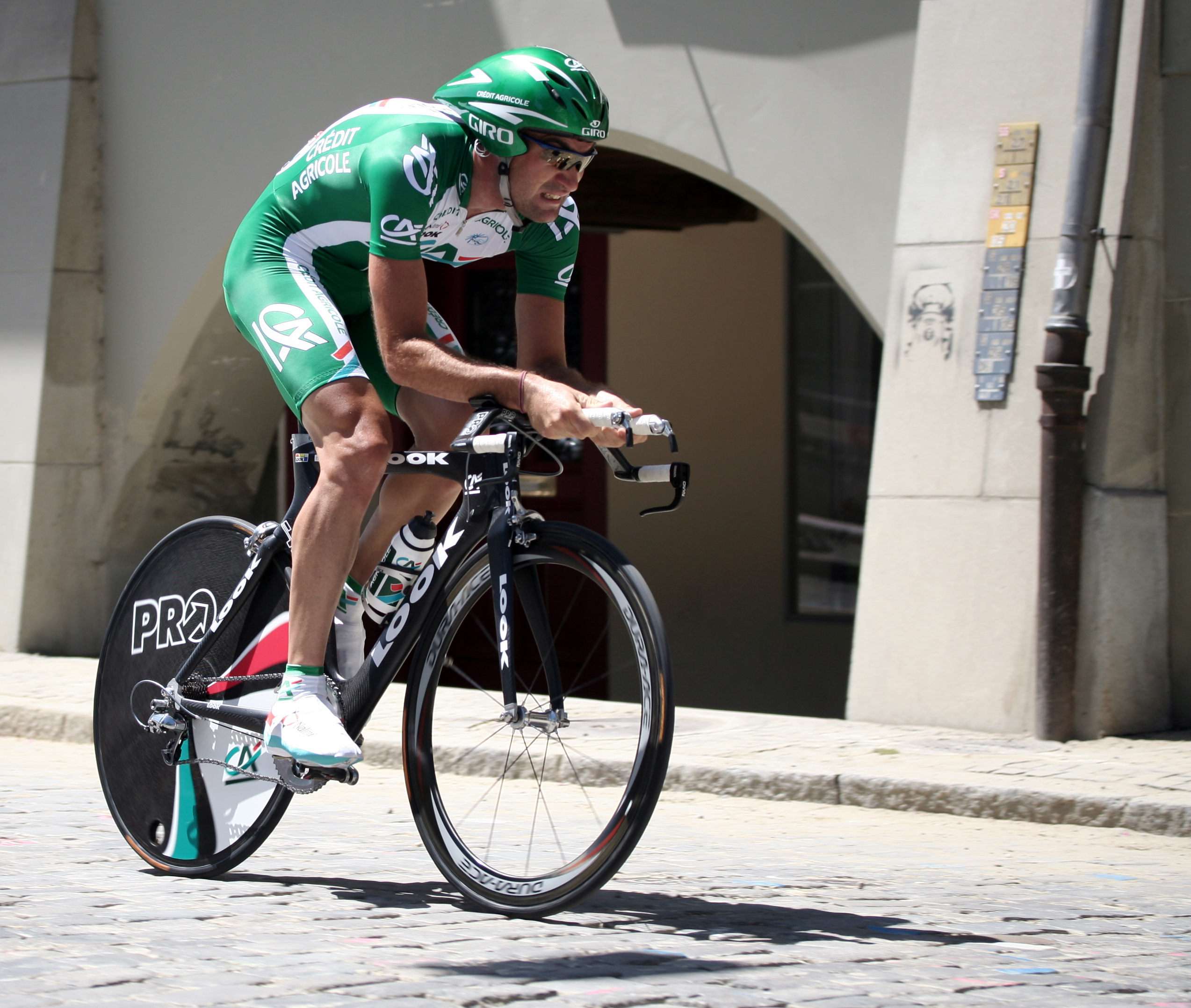
Christophe Laurent at the 2007 Tour de Suisse

Among professional sportspeople born in Mende, is the road cyclist Christophe Laurent who shone by winning the jersey for the best climber of the Tour de l'Avenir and the Tour of California.

The motorcyclist Laurent Charbonnel, winner of the prologue of the Paris-Dakar Rally (1991), also hails from Mende. He was one of the best enduro riders with the palmares of France, and was also vice World champion.

Kayaker Brigitte Guibal, Olympic silver medallist in 2000 in Sydney, was also born in Mende.

It is in 1988 that Marion Buisson was born in Mende. After making her athletics debut at the Éveil mendois, she continued her career at Clermont athletics. She became champion of France in the pole vault in 2008, thereby achieving the minimum to participate in the Beijing Summer Olympics.

==== Sporting events ====
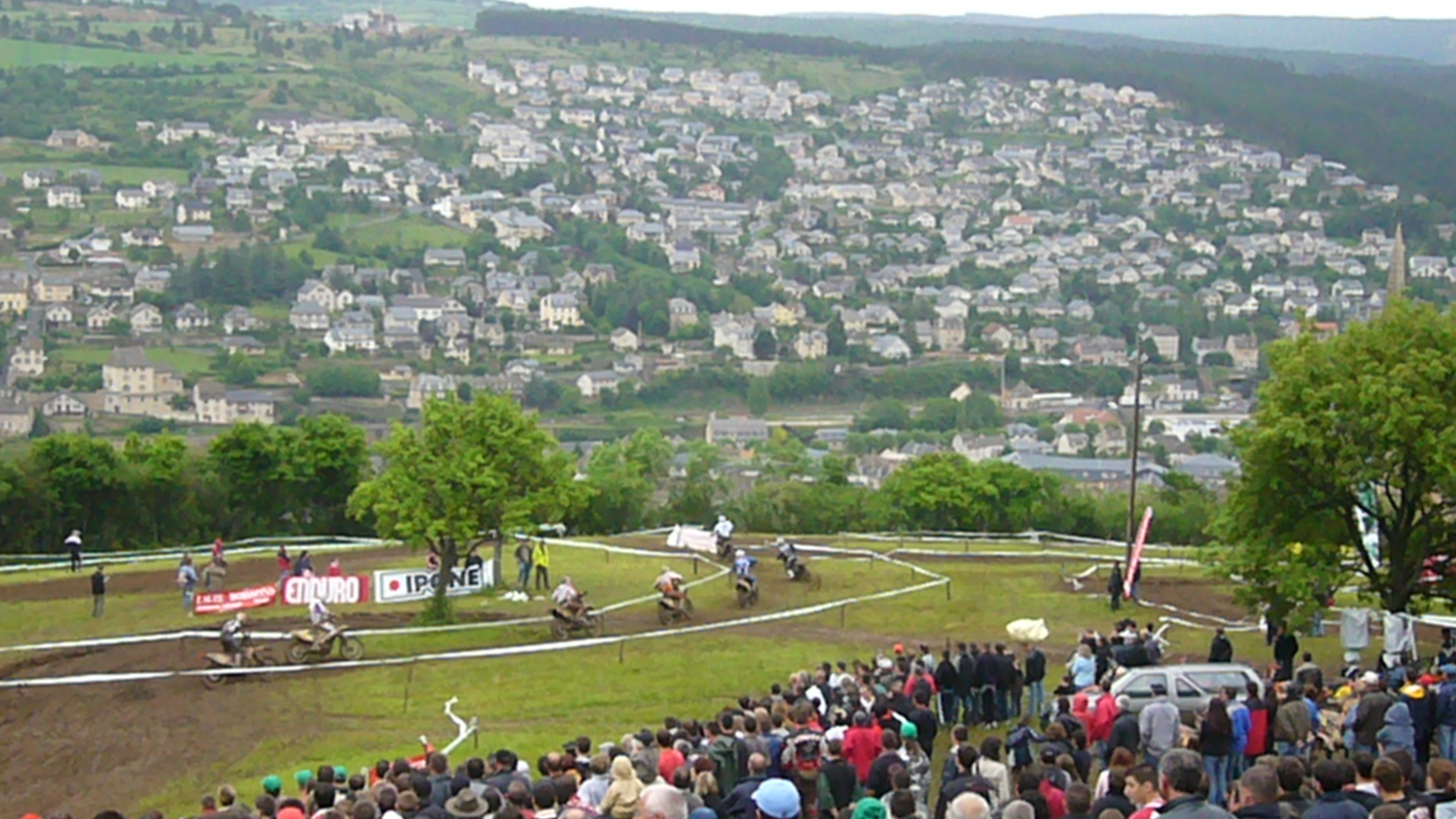
The Castan Trophy, final of the Trèfle Lozérien in 2008

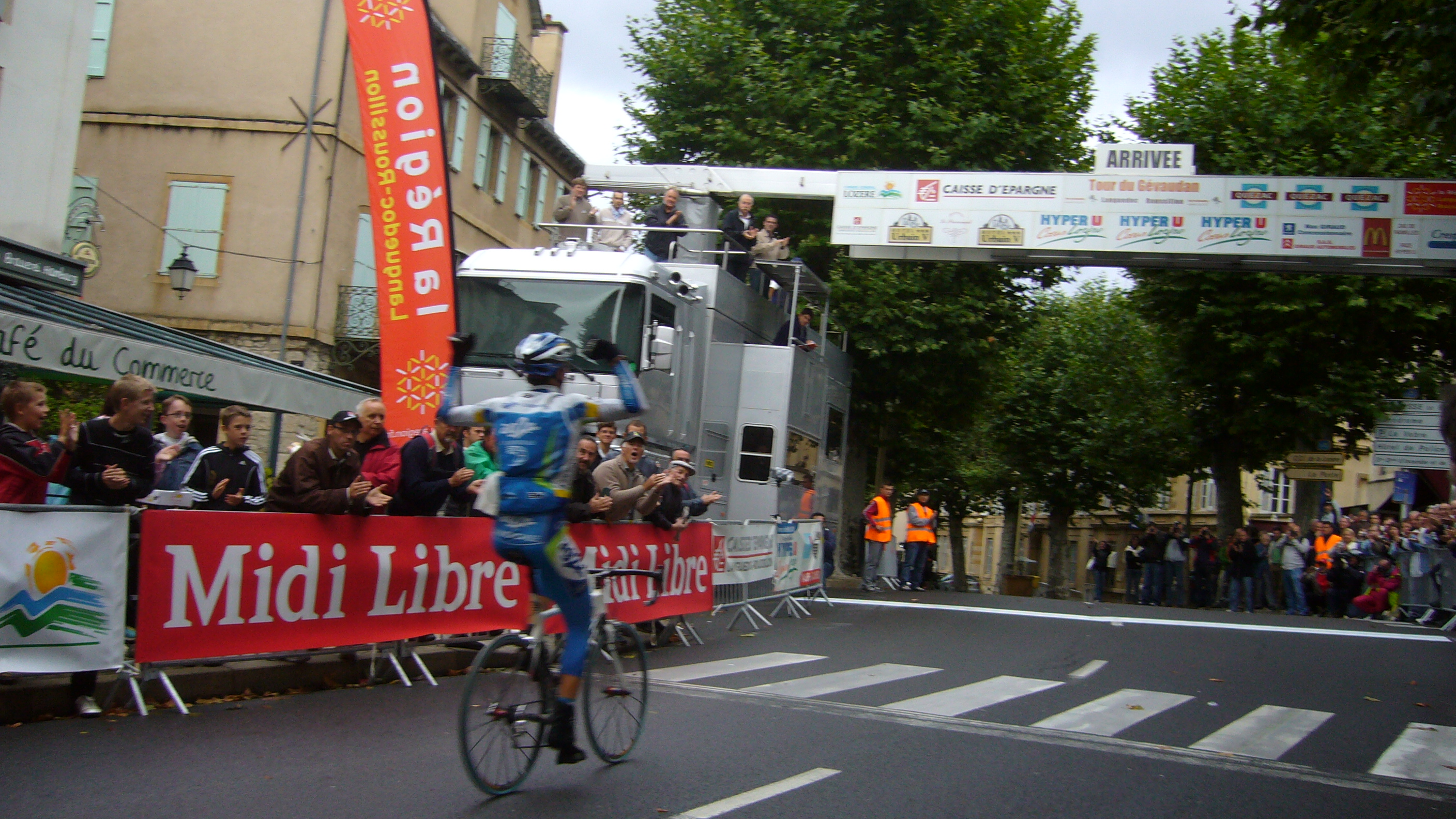
Julien Bérard won the 2nd stage of the Tour du Gévaudan 2008, which arrived in Mende

Each year, the Trèfle Lozérien, an enduro competition, centres its course on the city of Mende. This race is part of the most renowned of the enduro season and allows, in addition, mixing professional and amateur riders.

One month later (July), the city centre is dedicated to foot racing and the arrival of Marvejols-Mende half marathon. This race starts from Marvejols, joining Mende by the Col de Goudard and the Côte de Chabrits. It is sometimes used as a preparation marathon for major events (the World Championships, Olympic Games), but is also open to amateurs as the majority of the marathons. Since 2006, the month of July is also marked by the organisation of a national of pétanque.

Cycling is also in honour of the city. The Grand Prix of the city of Mende hosted the best professionals in the 1970s. Since then, the Côte de la Croix Neuve has seen five stage finishes in the Tour de France (1995, 2005, 2010, 2015, 2018), and stages in the Tour de l'Avenir, the Grand Prix du Midi Libre, the Tour du Languedoc-Roussillon and Paris-Nice. Since 2006 and the rebirth of the Tour du Gévaudan, Mende is judged the final arrival of this amateur race of great importance. In 2008, the event was organised as the Finale de la Coupe des France des clubs [final of the Cup of France for clubs]. During the winter, a grand prix of regional cyclo-cross is also organized. The grand departure of the Tour de France VTT 1996, as well as the first two stages, happened at Mende.

Mende was also host city of the Mediterranean Games in 1993 by hosting cycling, football, and swimming events.

In October 2005, the city hosted the 37th national congress of the French hiking federation, Lozère being a popular department for hikers, and is crossed by two of the most important roads of the pilgrimage to Santiago de Compostela. Then, in 2007, Mende was the host of a round of the French enduro championships, as well as the final of the Coupe de France rally.

In 2008, France welcomed the enduro European grand prix, the final of the World Championship (WEC). It was the town of Alès which was chosen to host the competition. However the organization was forced to give up, and it was finally hosted by Mende on 11 and 12 October 2008. In 2011, the city hosted the Grand Prix of France, final of the World Championship.

=== Media ===
Mende is the seat of most of the media of Lozère. Thus we find the writings of the Lozère edition of Midi Libre and Lozère nouvelle [New Lozère], with regard to the written press.

The radio station France Bleu and Totem have their editorial offices in Lozère. While Radio Eaux-Vives Lozère is installed at the former Grand Seminary.

=== Worship ===
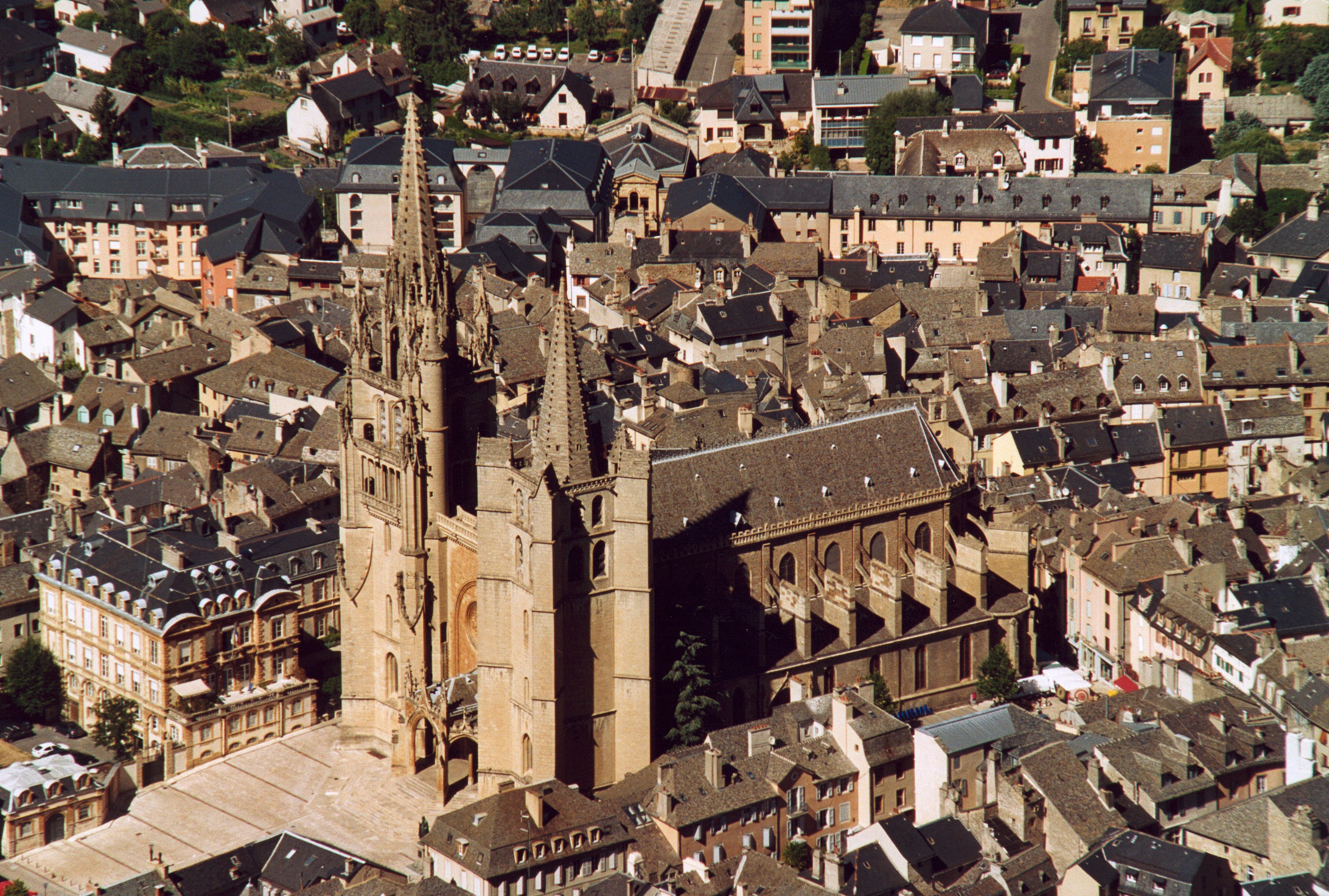
The cathedral

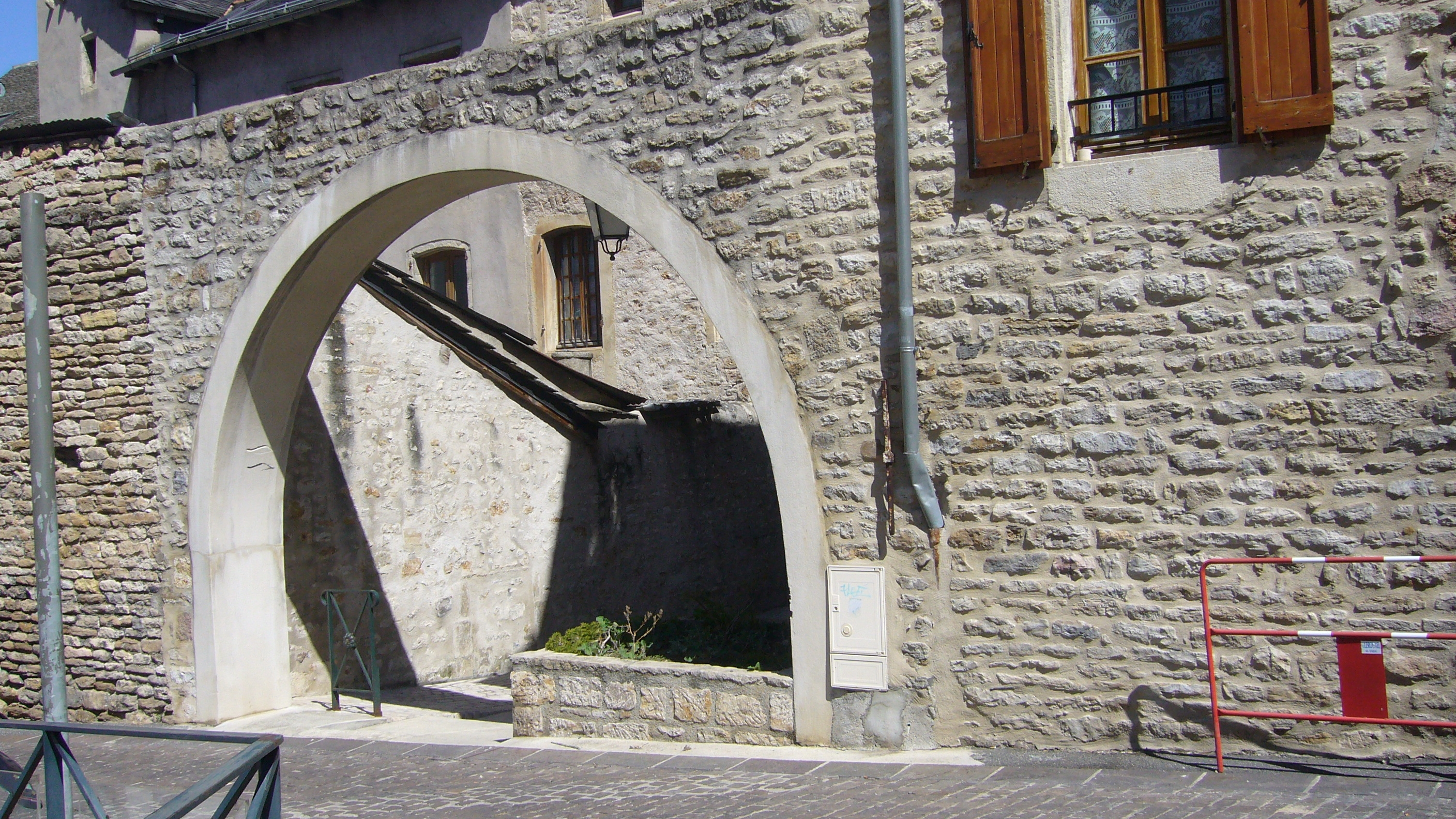
The entrance of the old synagogue

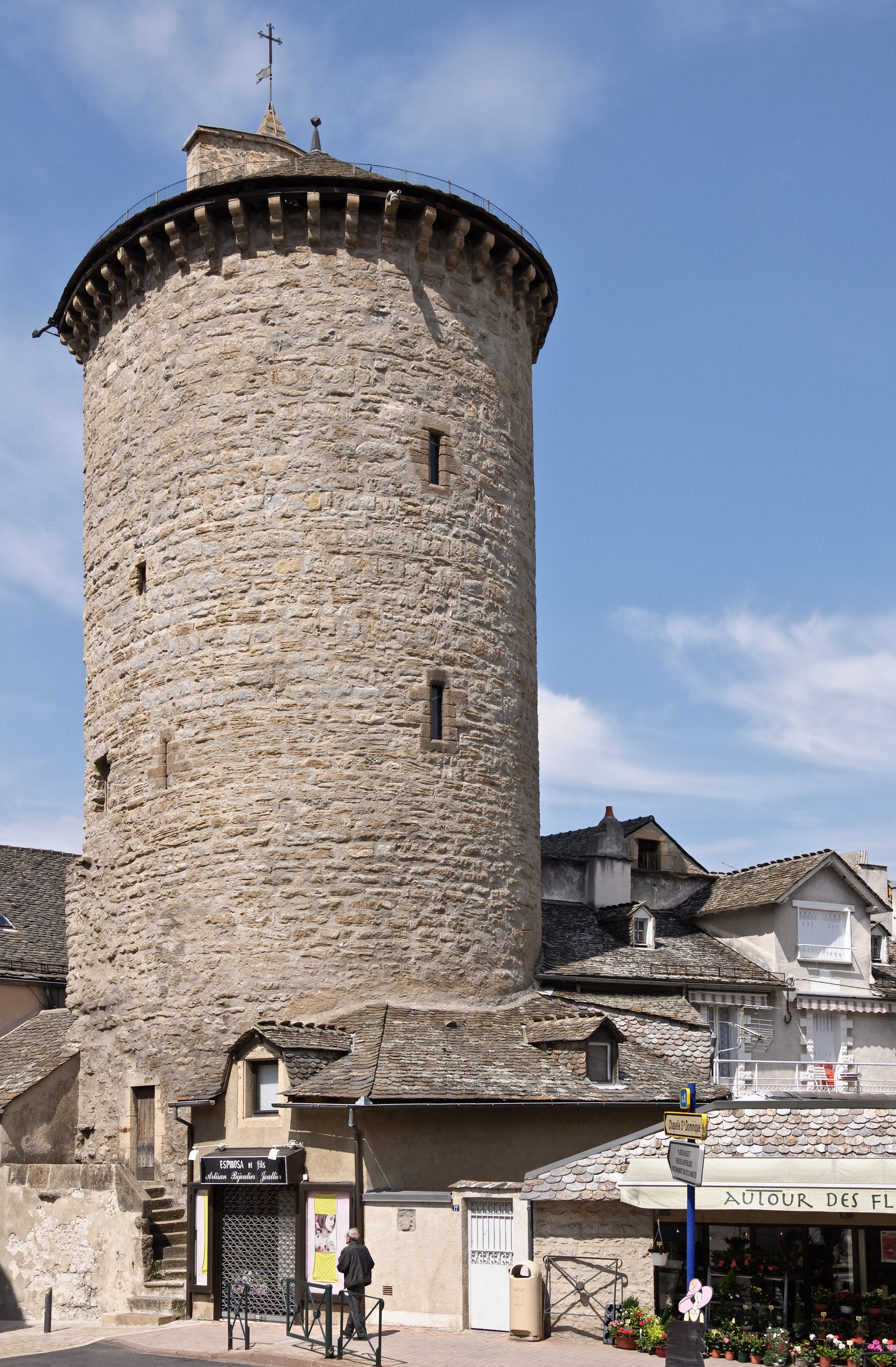
The Tower of the Penitents

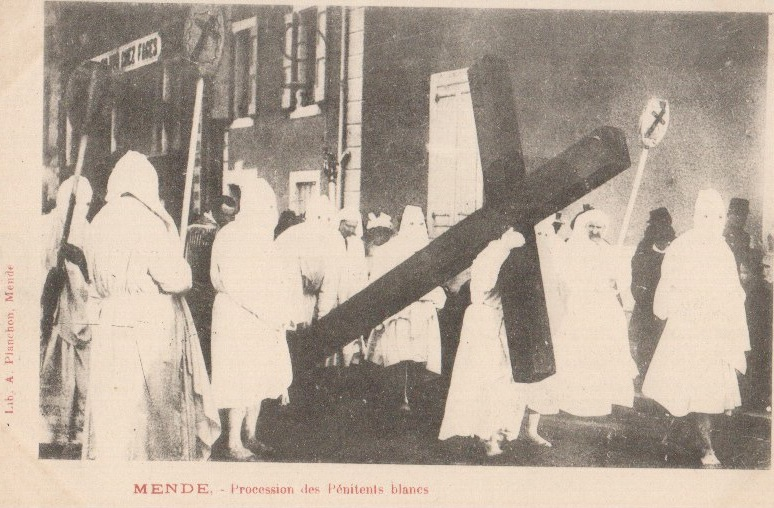
Procession of the White Penitents

The town of Mende is the episcopal seat of Gévaudan and Lozère, religious life has always been linked with its bishops. Also chapter headquarters, Mende has welcomed a large number of canons. A religious brotherhood, the "Brotherhood of the White Penitents" has long existed and has a procession every Holy Thursday since the 17th century. The Tower of the Penitents (called so because it is adjacent to the chapel of the penitents) is one of the last vestiges of the ramparts of the city.

The large and small seminaries are traces of the presence of the formation of Catholic priests.

The main place of worship is the Cathedral of Notre-Dame and Saint-Privat, built at the request of Pope Urban V, in place of the old church built over the tomb of Saint Privat but the city has many small chapels. One of the oldest is the chapel of Saint-Ilpide, on the hill of the executioner, which however was destroyed and replaced by a small chapel. Two other chapels are no longer used: That of the Penitents (future Museum of Religious Art) and the Chapel of Saint-Dominique (exhibition hall). The Chapel of the Hermitage (on Mont Mimat) and the cave which was drilled alongside, can still be used for offices.

The Carmelite convent has existed since 1880 and has hosted a community of Carmelite nuns, which ensures production of altar bread (or wafers) for the diocese (and those nearby). Another Convent is installed in Mende, which is the Adoration of Picpus Convent. At the Rue de la Chicanette is installed the Jeanne Delanoue community of the Providence; little used for celebration services, the place is used for meetings between people in the religious world. The community is at the origin of the creation of the institution Notre-Dame-de-la-Providence, a social children's home adjacent to its premises and which hosts minors under administrative and judicial protection. There are of other religious communities, mainly related to private schools and retirement or rest homes.

Worship in Mende, due to its history, is very oriented towards Catholicism, but there are other places of worship for other religions. Thus Mende, near of the Cévennes, has a Protestant temple installed in the Allée Paul Doumer.

The city also had a synagogue in the former Jewish quarter, but it has long since been abandoned. This synagogue, also called Ferrier House from the name of one of its former owners, is the last vestige of the Mende ghetto. The Jews were expelled from the Gévaudan in the 14th century, and this synagogue became the (Catholic) college of All Saints until the French Revolution.

Whilst counting the presence of a Muslim community, the city has no mosque, but simply an apartment that serves as place of worship.

== Economy ==
Industrial (wood industry, jewelry), service centre (shops, restaurants, bars), administrative (generates a lot of jobs) and tourism (medieval town, excursions to Gorges du Tarn), Mende is the starting point for the establishment of new businesses in the department, and turned more towards new technologies, with the advent of the technological hub.

The city has more than 1300 companies, including about 900 in the commercial sector, and has an unemployment rate of 10.7% (2017).

=== Zones of activities ===
The zones of activities

The city has five zones of economic activities (ZAE), each having a rather clearly defined role. The largest is the ZAE of the Causse d'Auge (north of the city), with a mainly industrial orientation in automation or in the management of the wood. The ZI of Gardès, on the road to Badaroux is an industrial area covering public works and mainly the building companies. The ZAE Lou Chaousse and Chabrits (both in the northwest) also have a vocation craft, but more oriented towards the trade for individuals. And finally, the Pôle lozérien d'économie numérique (POLeN) is turned to the new technologies.

In addition, since the mid-2000s, the ZAC de Ramille was created. This area, wedged between the Lot and the RN 88 on the road to Balsièges hosts a commercial zone which has tended to develop. It is without doubt, with the area of the Causse d'Auge, the area of activity that has extended most recently.

In the near future a new area of activity should emerge north of Mende, in the commune of Badaroux. This area whose size is expected to reach approximately 40 hectares (99 acres) initially, would be served by the RN 88 landscaped expressway.

=== The agricultural past ===
Distribution of enterprises (2015)
	Mende	Lozère
Number of enterprises	1,374	9,371
Industry	5.0%	7.5%
Construction	7.4%	9.6%
Shops and repairers	65.2%	49.9%
Services	20.6%	14.8%
0 employees	49.7%	69.6%
1 to 9 employees	38.8%	25.2%
10 to 50 employees	9.0%	4.1%
50+ employees	2.4%	1.0%

If the commune no longer has many farms, the city remains at the centre of a very rural area and is very oriented towards agriculture. Indeed, 54% of the Lozère territory is classified as a "utilised agricultural area". Livestock in the commune is mainly dedicated to the sheep sector, although cattle farms are found located between Mende and neighbouring communes.

This attraction to sheep is ancestral to Mende, since the city has long lived wool exploitation, since the 16th century. In 1333 the city already had a brotherhood of the weavers. In 1849, the town was still equipped with five large mills. However, while having a rich textile past, the city now retains no activity.

=== Industry ===
Like the Lozère department, industry in Mende is mainly oriented towards the timber sector: Its operation, its treatment, its derivatives, etc. Another industry that holds an important place in the city is that of construction and public works.

=== Shops and services ===
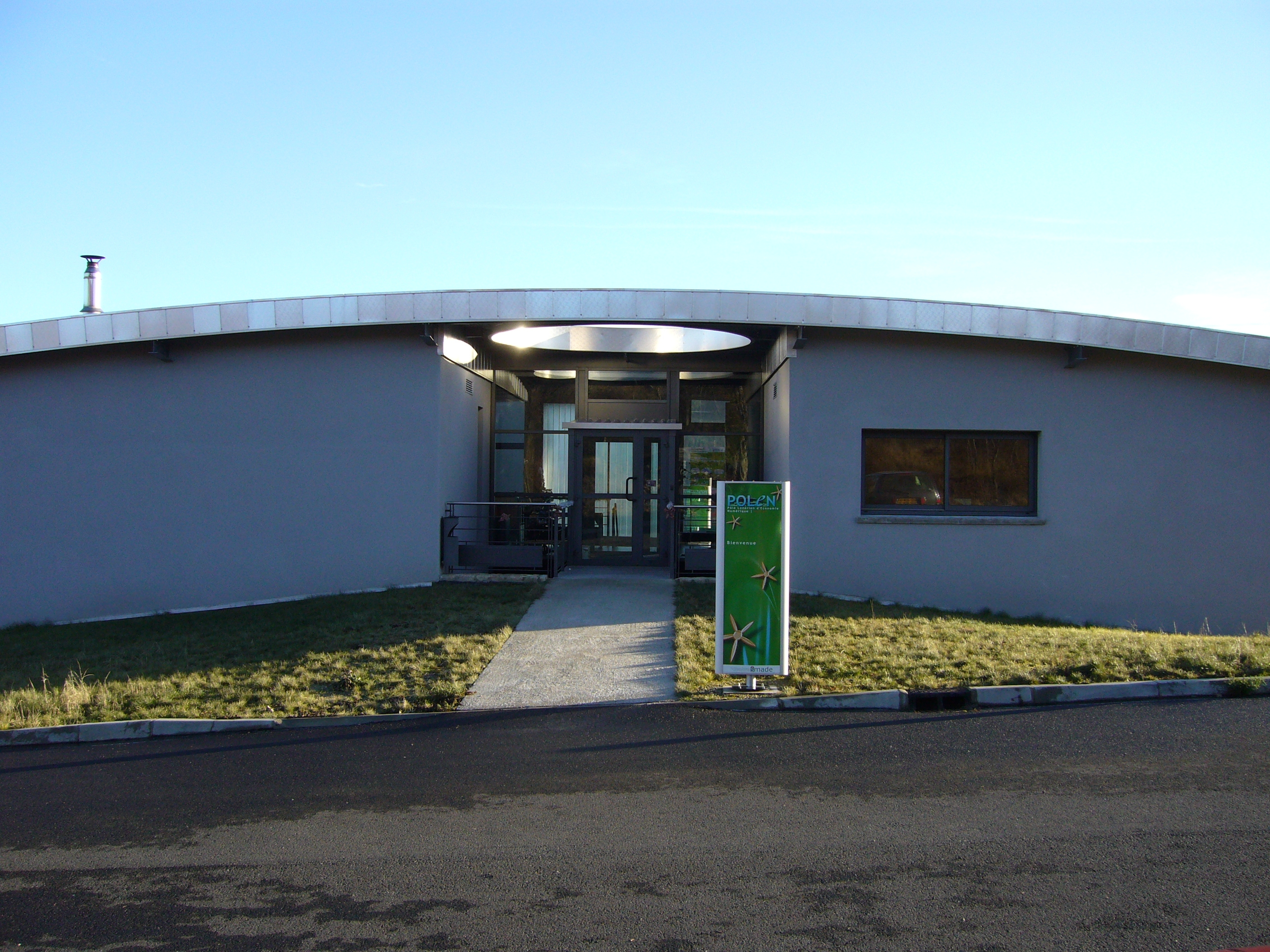
Entrance to POLeN (Note: POLeN for Pôle lozérien d'Économie Numérique, is a technology activities park, a business incubator and an ICT resource centre.)

Mende is also the seat of the Chambre de commerce et d'industrie de la Lozère that handles Mende Brenoux airfield.

The city is strongly turned towards the tertiary sector. As said above, a majority of the enterprises of the city are shops. Mende is the centre of an area's population of approximately 25,000 inhabitants around the Lot Valley, the city therefore centralises much of the services. Its quality of prefecture adds to the presence of public service.

Tourism has also developed since the end of the 20th century. This openness on tourism translated between 1983 and 2008 by the creation of the office of tourism (municipal and intermunicipal), an increase of 400 beds offered to tourists, the opening of a holiday village and of a youth hostel, but also the creation of activity centre (canoe base, Freestyle Park, etc.). The city has eleven hotels, four with three stars and four having two. To this one can add the holiday village of Chapitre that offers 42 gîtes for rent, as well as two campsites near the Lot.

Other businesses are those that can be found in other modern cities (banks, insurance, bakeries, the press houses, clothes, etc.). The city has a supermarket and a hypermarket, as well as several superettes and other discounters. The hypermarket, which is of recent construction, belongs to the Système U group and is located in the new area of activity of Ramilles. The supermarket (Intermarché) is, meanwhile, close to the city centre. Markets, vestiges of the traditional markets of the city are many, taking place on Wednesday (textile, utility, etc.) at Place Chaptal, and on Saturday mornings (food market) at Place Chaptal and Place Urbain V. In addition, night markets are held during the summer.

=== Business ===
The main companies in terms of turnover, as well as major private employers are:

Name	Employees	Turnover	Sector
Robbez-Masson	250	€44M	Jewellery
EURL Magne Distribution	144	€11M	Wholesaler
Sté mendoise des supermarchés (Note: Hyper U Cœur Lozère)	140	€26M	Supermarket
Engelvin TP réseaux	107	€14M	Public works
Engelvin bois	74	€4.2M	Sawmill
Société des travaux publics lozériens (STPL)	72	Not included	Public works
Sud Expert Conseil	43	Not included	Accounting activities
Engelvin bois moulé	32	€5.5M	Wood treatment
Grand garage de Lozère (Note: Peugeot and Citroën garages)	28	€11M	Car Garage
AGT Groupe	21	€1.5M	Council and IT development
SAS Pages et fils	18	€38M	Fuels

== Local culture and heritage ==
=== Places and monuments ===
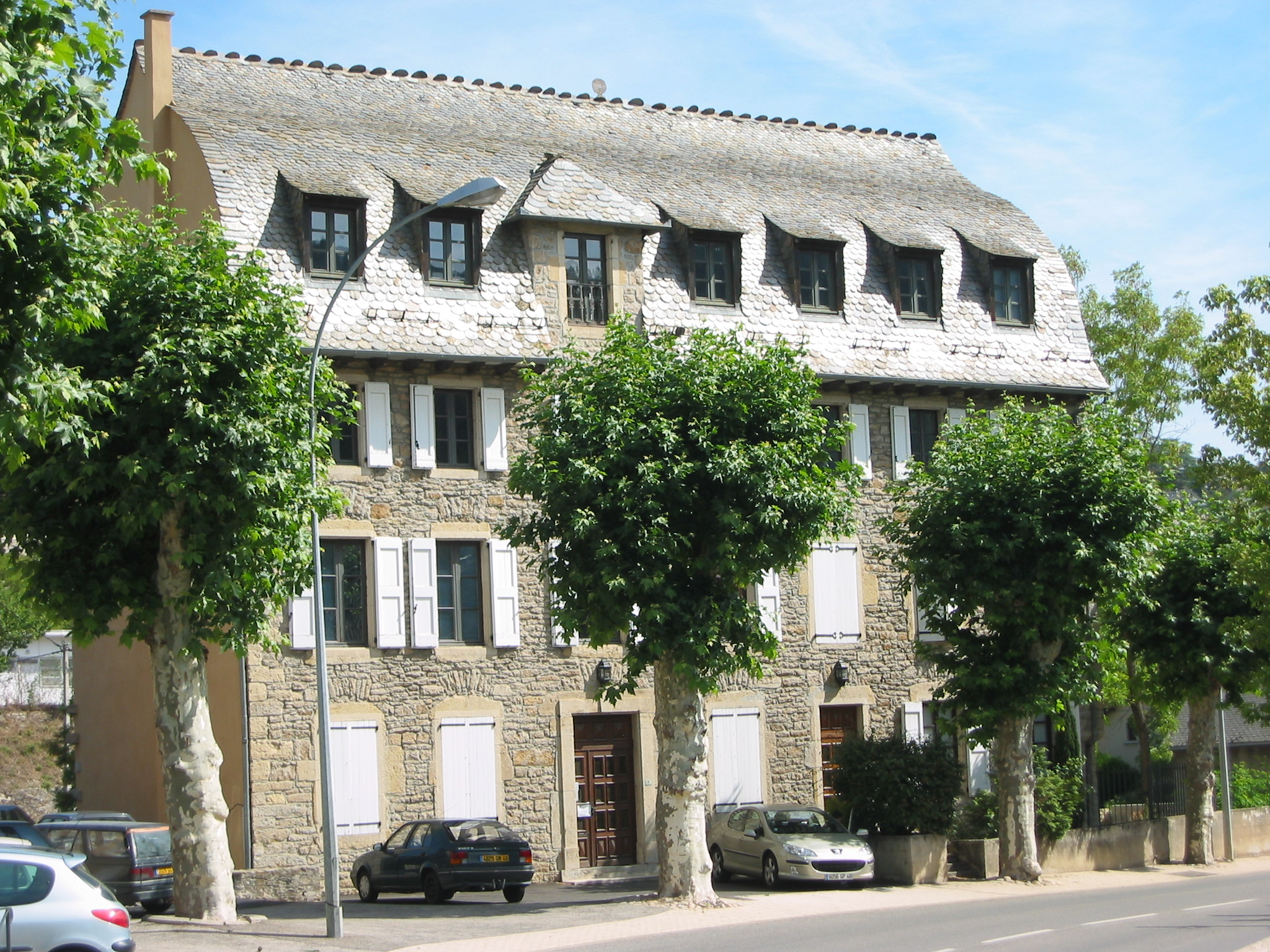
A house with a toit en carène

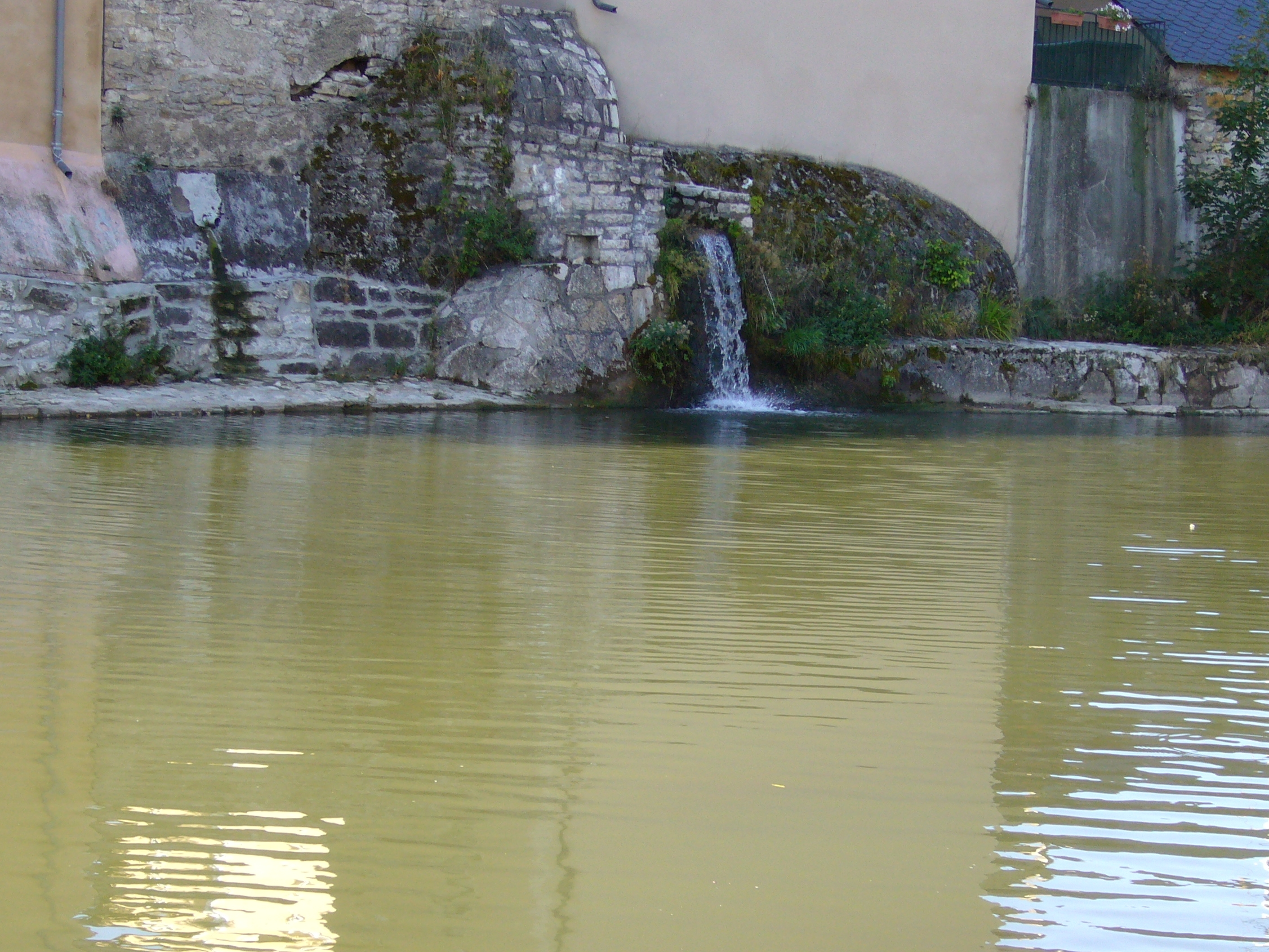
The water flows through underground pipes to the Lot, here to the Notre Dame Bridge

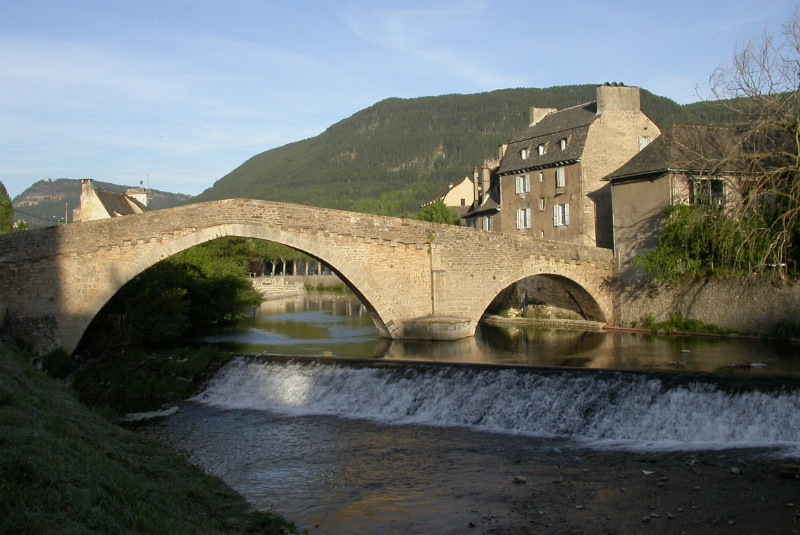
The Notre-Dame Bridge

Since 1981 Mende has been classified as a city of art, and, since 2000, the grouping of Mende and Lot in the Gévaudan has the label of "city and land of art and history".

The city has a rich architectural heritage, a testament to the prosperous period associated with the papacy.

- The Cathedral Notre-Dame and Saint-Privat

The Cathedral of Saint-Privat (classed as a historical monument in 1906) whose construction began in 1368 at the initiative of Pope Urban V. Its bell towers date back, however, to the 16th century, following the destruction of one of them during the passage of the Huguenots by Matthieu Merle. The large belfry included housing "Non Pareille", the largest bell in the world melted between 1517 and 1521 in Villefort and destroyed during the Wars of Religion. There remains only the clapper. The cathedral consists of twelve rectangular chapels, two pentagonal chapels and a sacristy. Originally it was built above the Sainte-Thècle crypt where the body of Saint Privat had been buried. It is located next to the old episcopal palace.

- Public fountains

The city has many public fountains. Water from the causses thus enters a piping system located beneath the city before joining the Lot. Two of them (Aigues-Passe and Soubeyrand) are classified as historic monuments. Piped water also enters the old wash house of the Calquières, still visible on Rue d'Angiran.

- The Tower of the Penitents

This tower is one of the few remains of the ancient walls of the 12th century. Protecting the Gate of Angiran which was next to it, this tower served as guard for the short-lived Seneschal of Mende. It includes three floors and an attic. This is the installation of the chapel which is adjacent, and especially its bell tower at the top which saved the tower during the destruction of the walls in 1768.

- The Notre-Dame Bridge

Dating back to the 13th century, this bridge is one of the symbols of the city. It has never been carried away by frequent floods in Mende. It formerly went by the name of Peyrenc Bridge, then took the name of Notre Dame due to the presence on its mouth of a Virgin, which disappeared during the Wars of Religion. Its span has a 22 metres (72 ft) opening and is 7 metres (23 ft) high.

- The Hermitage of Saint Privat

Saint Privat withdrew, in the 3rd century, into caves that he had built over Mende, on Mont Mimat. Since his Hermitage was built, it also to allow the pilgrims to go there. It can be accessed either by Way of the Cross (from the market) or by road from the causse (RD 25). At the hermitage, we find a hotel for the reception of the pilgrims, (Note: This hotel has since closed) a chapel, grotto and a breakthrough designed to the original cave.

- The former consular home

The House where the consul sat, since 1578, also served as city hall after the Revolution. On its pediment is found the arms of the city: "Azure in the Gothic M of or, a shining Sun similarly topped." Facing it is a trompe-l'œil wall symbolizing the twinning of Mende and Volterra.

- Bahours Castle

Located in the northwest of the city, the Bahours locality had two castles, one of which was destroyed in 1960. The remaining one is a strong house (manse) built in the 17th century, possibly on the foundations of a more ancient building. The main interest of this strong house is its kitchen listed as a historical monument, like the whole building.

=== Cultural facilities ===
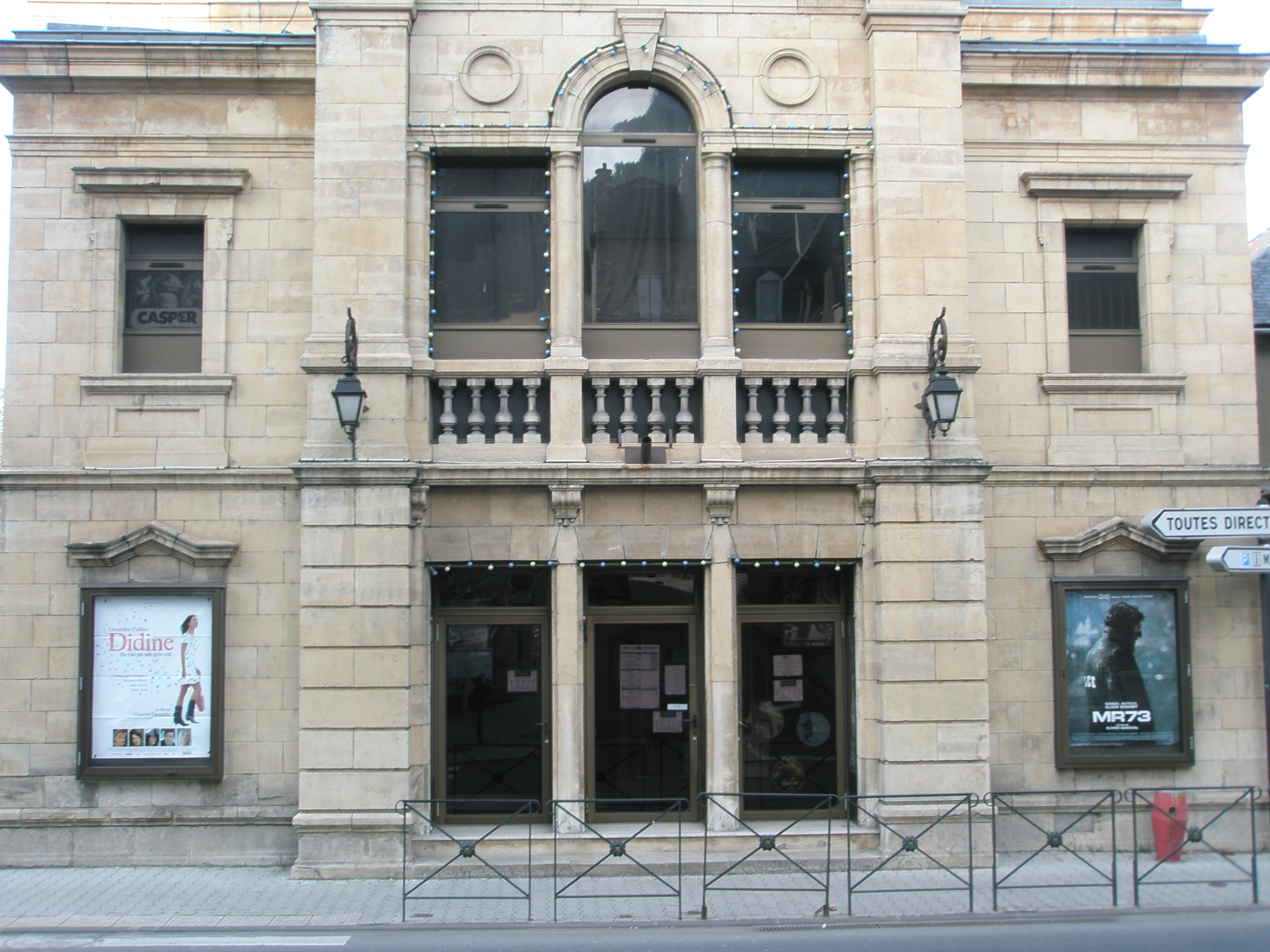
The old theatre became municipal cinema (miniplex)

Mende features a municipal theatre and several rooms that can be used to this kind of show. The ancient theatre of the city turned into cinema. A development project involves the construction of a new multicultural hall. In addition, Mende has a departmental library, the Lamartine Library.

==== Theatres and auditoriums ====
The ancient theatre of the city, established between 1890 and 1895, was replaced by a cinema. The main room used for the theatre is now the festival hall located at the market. This room, and its natural scenery of arches, is multi-cultural and is the largest in the city in terms of capacity. On the market lies the antirouille, a municipal building for young people and allowing everyone to have access to the internet, this building has a room to organize concerts.

Near the market, along the Chemin Saint-Ilpide, the Urban V municipal room hosts plays, live shows, and also meetings and projections (world knowledge, for example).

Finally as part of the redevelopment of the market (started by the installation of the intercommunal tourism office and the renovation of the Lamartine Library), an auditorium should be created behind the festival hall (the Émile-Joly Square being moved).

==== Museums and exhibitions ====
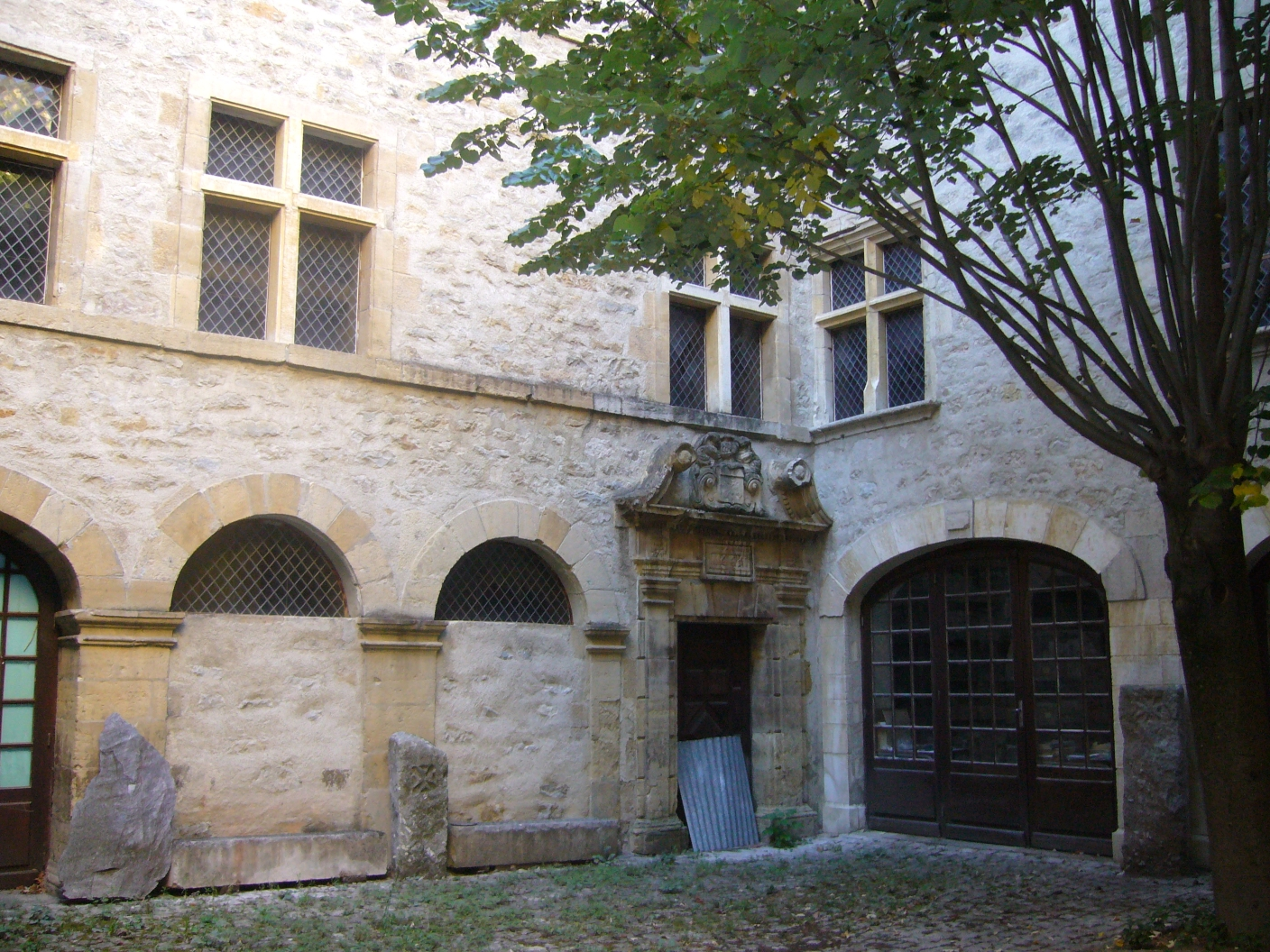
The courtyard of the Hôtel de Ressouches

The Ignon-Fabre Museum (or the Museum of Mende) was located on Rue de l'Épine [street of the Holy thorn], at the Hôtel de Ressouches, where there was installed the first electrification plant of the city. It was however closed due to lack of budget. Before it, a museum was located in a house next to the prison.

The Chapel of Saint-Dominique and the current Department Hall can serve as an exhibition space, as can the Chapel of the Penitents and the former consular house.

In addition a project of the Museum of Sacred Arts, currently under study, should be installed in the Chapel of the Penitents.

=== Quotes on Mende ===
Mende, well located city

And adorned with art
Your bubbling bright springs
Decorate you and adorn you

As the gemstone in a crown.

— Unknown poet, 14th century

The poem, written by an author whose story did not retain the name, was confirmed in the 19th century:

Nothing is as beautiful as the view to be enjoyed on the hill which overlooks Mende. The green mountains surround the city, the gardens, the bold and elegant cathedral spires, all this presents a tableau of the most picturesque.

However, not everyone had a positive vision of the city. It had long had problems with sewage into the modern era, and was denigrated despite its charm:

This city is small and the triangular shape makes it look pretty much like the shape of a heart. It is heavily populated, dirty, unsavoury and stifled. Its fountains are its main beauty.

This quote comes perhaps from the conditions in which the geographer of the king came in the city. Like those who would declare to Serge Livrozet that Mende was capital of Lozère and torture.

=== Personalities linked to the commune ===
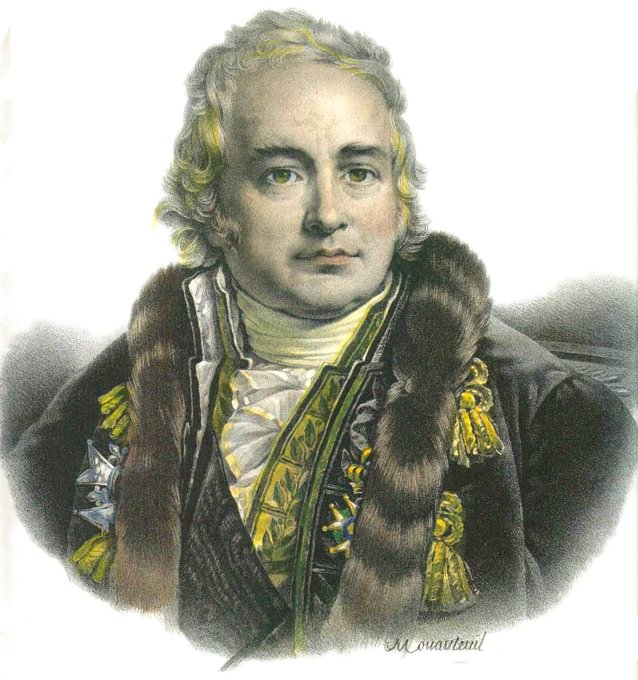
Jean-Antoine Chaptal

Those born in Mende, or having a very strong tie with the city include:

==== Born in Mende ====
- Jean-Baptiste Amédée de Grégoire de Saint-Sauveur (1709-1792), Bishop of Bazas, deputy of the clergy of the Seneschal of Bazas and Dean of the members of the Estates General of 1792.
- Abraham Fontanel (1740-1817), art dealer and collector, founder of the society of fine arts in Montpellier
- Abbon-Pierre-François Bonnel de la Brageresse (1757-1844), Bishop of Viviers.
- Jean-Jacques Fayet (1786-1849), Member of Parliament for Lozère, Bishop of Orléans.
- Nicolas Roch (1813-1879), great executioner of Paris.
- Charles du Pont de Ligonnès (1845-1925), French lieutenant, Bishop of Rodez and Vabres.
- Marie Borrel, born around 1886, recognized as part of the Lourdes Medical Bureau.
- Henri Bourrillon (1891-1944), lawyer. During World War II, he was mayor of the city before becoming a hero of the Resistance, deported to Auschwitz, then Buchenwald, died on German roads.
- Gaby Bruyère (1924-1978), actress.
- Thierry Jean-Pierre (1955-2005), investigative judge, a lawyer and politician.
- Claude Érignac (1937-1998), French officer, prefect of Corsica.
- Joseph de La Porte du Theil, officer French general, best known as the founder and head of the Chantiers de la Jeunesse during the Vichy regime.
- René Boullier de Branche (1941-1981), politician, Deputy of Mayenne.
- Michel Rostain, born in 1942, theatre director and writer, Prix Goncourt du premier roman in 2011
- Francis Saint-Léger born in 1957, politician, Member of Parliament for Lozère.
- Élisabeth Filhol, born in 1965, writer.
- Brigitte Guibal, born in 1971, kayaker.
- Quentin Elias (1974-2014), singer and former member of the boy band Alliage, model and actor in adult films.
- Christophe Laurent, born in 1977, professional cyclist.
- Marion Buisson, born in 1988, pole vaulter.
- Charlène Clavel, born in 1991, handball player
- Ludivine Coulomb, born in 1992, footballer

==== Linked to the commune ====
- Urban V (1310-1370), Pope, born in the commune of Le Pont-de-Montvert but strongly attached to the episcopal capital of Gévaudan.
- Jean-Antoine Chaptal (1756-1832), born in the vicinity of Mende, but in the commune of Badaroux, it is however very linked to the city. He was a chemist, businessman and Councillor of State under Napoleon. He was the inventor of chaptalisation (process aimed at improving the quality of the wine).
- Jean-Joseph-Marie-Eugène de Jerphanion (1796-1864), Bishop of Saint-Dié was educated at Mende, from the time his father Gabriel-Joseph de Jerphanion was the first prefect of the Lozère.
- Marie-Lucien-Théophile Coupier. Engineer and French diplomat. Prefect of Lozère from 1869 to 1870.
- Paul Doumer (1857-1932), before becoming President of the Republic, he was a college professor in Mende.
- Clovis Brunel (1884-1971), born in Amiens, but who long worked as an archivist in Mende.
- Joseph Joanovici (1905-1965), under house arrest in Mende.
- Alexandre Grothendieck (1928-2014), mathematician, winner of the Fields Medal. As a child, he was deported to the camp of Rieucros.
- Canon Clavel of Saint-Geniez (1808-1876), physician and botanist, studied at the seminary and became a Bachelor of Arts, there, in 1827.

=== Heraldry, motto and logo ===
==== Coat of arms of 1475 ====
When King Louis XI granted autonomy to the city, he granted new arms in 1469. An 'L' surmounted by a crown, in gratitude to the king, was added to these in 1475.

Mende in 1469	On the left, the arms of the cities of 1469 and 1475, with the blazon: Or, a fess gules, surmounted two fleurs de lys of France. Right, those which are updated in honour of King Louis XI, from 1475, and which persisted until the 16th century.	Mende from 1475

==== Current blazon ====
The current coat of arms dates from the sixteenth century. These weapons were registered in the Armorial General of France in 1697.

Arms of Mende	The arms of Mende are blazoned : Azure, to a letter M uncial of or topped of a sun of the same. The motto is: Tenebrae eam non comprehenderunt (Darkness has not invaded me). The symbolism of the shield, also named "the shining sun", and the motto both illustrate Mende loyalty towards the Catholic faith during the dark hours of the Wars of Religion.

== See also ==
- Communes of the Lozère department
- Tourism in Lozère
- Generality of Toulouse
- Parlement of Toulouse
- Languedoc
- Estates of Languedoc
- Pays d'états
- Gare de Mende
- Mausoleum of Lanuéjols

== General bibliography ==
- Bardy, Benjamin (1973). Mende [Mende] (in French). Ingersheim: Éditions SAEP.
- Un siècle d'images mendoises [A century of mendoises pictures] (in French). 1974.
- Marcillac, Sylvain; Salles, Jean-François (1996). Guetteurs du temps : la basilique cathédrale de Mende [Lookouts of the time: the Cathedral Basilica of Mende] (in French). Mende: ARACAM.
- Taillefer, Didier (2003). Mende : 2000 ans d'histoire [Mende: 2000 years of history] (in French). Toulouse: Editions Privat. ISBN 2-70899-718-1.
- Les campagnes de Mende, les communes rurales des cantons de Mende [Mende countryside, the rural communes of the cantons of Mende] (in French). Lyon: Éditions Lieux-dits. 2007. ISBN 978-2914528368. Inventory of heritage, southern France.
- Desdouits, Michel; Laurans, Alain (17 October 2023). Mende-en-Gévaudan [Mende-en-Gévaudan] (in French). Alan Sutton. ISBN 978-2842535384.
- Bunel, Claude (1954). Bulletin de la Société des lettres, sciences et arts de la Lozère [Bulletin of the Society of the letters, sciences and arts of the Lozère] (in French).
- Barbot, Dr. Marcel (1958). Les siècles obscurs de la primitive histoire de Mende [The obscure centuries of the primitive history of Mende] (in French).
- Remize (1910). Saint Privat, martyr, évêque du Gévaudan, IIIe siècle [Saint Privat, martyr, Bishop of Gévaudan, 3rd century] (in French). Mende.
- André, Auguste (1931). La Bête du Gévaudan [The beast of Gévaudan] (in French). Mende: H. Chaptal.
