= Pere (name) =

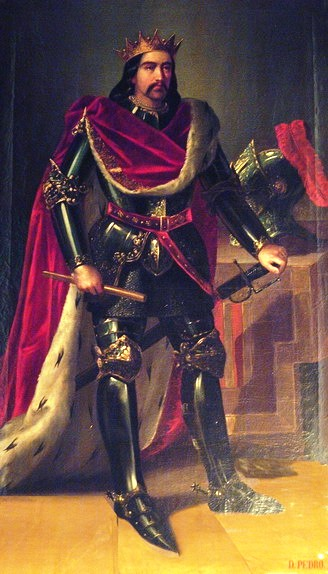
- Pere el Catòlic as depicted by Manuel Aguirre y Monsalbe (portrait c.1850s)
- Gender: Masculine
- Language: Catalan

Other gender
- Feminine: Petra (from Latin)

Origin
- Language: Greek
- Origin: petra
- Meaning: (as strong as a) rock, stone

Other names
- Variant forms: Peire, Peyre
- Pet names: Peret, Perot
- Cognates: List; including Peter, Pedro, Pierre, Per
- Related names: Perez

Pere is a Catalan given name and, separately, a Polynesian given name and surname. It is the Catalan rendering of Peter, while usage across Polynesia has both local and borrowed origins.

== Origins and etymology ==
=== Catalan ===
The Catalan given name Pere (pronounced ['pɛɾːə]) derives directly from Saint Peter (in Catalan, Sant Pere). Like other cognate variants of Peter, this comes from Aramaic Kefa through Greek transliteration to petra – both meaning "stone, rock" – and its masculine name invention Πέτρος, Petros, given to Saint Peter as an apostle. It is an origin of the common surname Perez (son of Pere/Pero), and has led to other given names and surnames, particularly composite names which would have begun as "Pere de [name]". The Occitan, and medieval Catalan, spelling of the given name is traditionally Peire or Peyre, though it is through Occitan that Pere (without diacritics) became a surname in France (rather than as a modification of Père).

Pere is rarely found as a surname in American English contexts; when it is, it typically descends from the Catalan Pere or French Père (honorific Father) and Péré (pear tree or Peter), old Hungarian Pere (also Peter), or as an alternative spelling of English pear.

=== Polynesia ===
The name Pere in Polynesian contexts (pronounced /pe.ɾe/) can be an alternative spelling of the name Perry or a transliteration of the English name Bell, as one sense of Māori pere is ringing bells. The name is unrelated to Māori common nouns based on pere meaning arrow.

== People ==
=== Given name ===
==== # ====
- Peter II of Aragon (1178–1213), particularly when known as Pere el Catòlic
- Peter III of Aragon (1239–1285), particularly when known as Pere II of Barcelona
- Peter IV of Aragon (1319–1387), particularly when known as Pere III el Cerimoniós
- Pere II of Urgell (1340–1408), Aragon nobility

==== A ====
- Pere d'Abella, 15th century Catalan poet
- Christopher Pere Ajuwa (1941–2017), Nigerian businessman
- Pere Alberch (1954–1998), Spanish biologist
- Pere Alberch Vila (1517–1582), Catalan composer
- Pere d'Alberní (1747–1802), Spanish soldier and governor of Alta California
- Peire d'Alvernhe, 12th century Auvergnat troubadour
- Pere Amat (born 2004), Spanish hockey player
- Pere Antoni Beuter (1490–1554), Valencian historian
- Pere Aragonès (born 1982), former president of the Generalitat of Catalonia
- Pere Ardiaca (1909–1986), Catalan communist
- Pere Areny (1913–1943), Andorran convicted murderer and last person to be executed by Andorra
- Pere Ariweriyai (born 1983), Nigerian footballer
- Pere d'Artés (died 15th century), Valencian nobleman
- Peire Autier (died 1310), Languedoc Cathar leader

==== B ====
- Peire de Barjac, 13th century Languedoc troubadour
- Pere Baró (born 1991), Andorran politician
- Pèire Bec (1921–2014), Occitan poet and linguist
- Pere Blai (1553–1621), Spanish architect
- Pere Borrell del Caso (1835–1910), Catalan artist
- Pere Bosch-Gimpera (1891–1974), Spain-born Mexican anthropologist and archaeologist
- Peire Bremon lo Tort, 12th century Viennois troubadour
- Peire de Bussignac, 12th century French troubadour

==== C ====
- Pere Cabot (1877–1907), Catalan footballer
- Pere Calders (1912–1994), Catalan writer
- Peire de la Caravana, 12th century Italian troubadour
- Pere Miquel Carbonell (1434–1517), Catalan historian
- Peire Cardenal, 13th century troubadour
- Pere de Cardona (died 1530), bishop of Urgell and president of the Generalitat of Catalonia
- Pere Casaldàliga i Pla (1928–2020), Spanish-born Brazilian prelate of the Catholic Church
- Pere Caselles i Tarrats (1864–1936), Catalan Modernisme architect
- Peire de Castelnou (died 1208), French beatified ecclesiastic
- Peire de Castelnou, 13th century French troubadour
- Guilhem Peire Cazals de Caortz, 13th century Occitan troubadour
- Peire de Cols d'Aorlac, 12th century Auvergnat troubadour
- Pere de Coma (died 13th century), Catalan architect
- Pere Compte (died 1506), Catalan architect
- Peire de Corbiac, 13th century Gascon cleric and troubadour
- Pere Coromines i Montanya (1870–1939), Catalan politician
- Pere Créixams (1893–1965), Catalan artist

==== E ====
- Peire Espanhol (c. 1150–c. 1220, Limousin troubadour
- Pere Esteve (1942–2005), Catalan politician
- Pere Estupinyà (born 1974), Spanish biochemist

==== F ====
- Pere Fages (1734–1794), Spanish soldier and governor of Las Californias
- Pere-Enric de Ferran i de Rocabruna (1865–1919), Catalan composer
- Pere Font Moles (1926–2025), Andorran politician
- Joan Pere Fontanella (1576–1649), Catalan judge
- Pere Formiguera (1952–2013), Spanish photographer and writer

==== G ====
- Pere García (born 1963), Spanish handballer
- Pere Garriga Cazorla (born 1998), Spanish chess grandmaster
- Pere Arnaut de Garro (died 1422), Basque nobleman
- Pere Gimferrer (born 1945), Spanish poet
- Guillaume Peyre de Godin (died 1336), French Dominican theologian and Cardinal
- Pèire Godolin (1580–1649), Occitan poet
- Pere Gratacós (born 1958), Catalan footballer and manager
- Pere Guardiola (born 1976), Spanish football executive
- Pere Guerrero (born 1973), Spanish canoeist

==== H ====
- Pere Haro (born 2004), Spanish footballer

==== J ====
- Pere Johan, 15th century Catalan sculptor

==== K ====
- Pere Karoba (born 1981), Indonesian rower

==== L ====
- Peire de Ladils, 14th century Gascon troubadour
- Pere López Agràs (born 1971), Andorran politician
- Peire Guilhem de Luserna, 13th century Piedmontese Occitan troubadour

==== M ====
- Pere Macias (born 1956), Catalan politician
- Peire de Maensac, 13th century Auvergnat knight and troubadour
- Pere Mañach (1869–1940), Catalan art dealer
- Pere March (died 1413), Valencian poet
- Pere Marco (born 2003), Spanish footballer
- Pere Marsili (died 14th century), Catalan chronicler
- Pere Martí (born 1982), Spanish footballer and manager
- Pere Martínez (born 1991), Spanish footballer
- Pere Milla (born 1992), Catalan footballer
- Peire Milo, 13th century Italian troubadour
- Pasqual Pere Moles (1741–1797), Valencian-Catalan artist
- Pere Moles (1935–2024), Andorran politician
- Pere Molins (1889–1955), Catalan footballer
- Pere Monistrol (1894–1972), Catalan footballer
- Pere de Montagut, 13th century Catalan squire
- Peire de Montagut (died 1232), Grand Master of the Knights Templar
- Peire Lunel de Montech, 14th century knight, politician and troubadour
- Pere de Montsó, 12th century Aragonese troubadour
- Pere Valentí Mora (born 1947), Spanish footballer and manager
- Pere Moragues, 14th century Catalan sculptor
- Peire de la Mula, 13th century Italian troubadour

==== N ====
- Pere Navarro (born 1959), Catalan politician
- Pere Navarro Olivella (born 1952), Spanish politician
- Pere Noguera (born 1941), Catalan artist
- Pere Nolasc (1189–1256), Catholic Saint

==== O ====
- Pere Oller (died 15th century), Catalan sculptor
- Pere Oriola (born 1992), Spanish basketball player
- Pere Maria Orts i Bosch (1921–2015), Valencian writer

==== P ====
- Pere Palau Torres (1946–2025), Spanish Balearic politician
- Pere Pastor Vilanova (born 1968), Andorran judge
- Peire Pelet (died 1303), Languedoc nobility
- Pere Ponce (born 1964), Spanish actor
- Pere Joan Pons (born 1970), Spanish Balearic politician
- Pere Pons (born 1993), Catalan footballer
- Pere Portabella (born 1927), Spanish politician and filmmaker
- Peret (Pubill Calaf) (1935–2014), Catalan Romani musician
- Pere Puig (born 1932), Spanish chess player
- Pere Puig Subinyà (1914–1999), Catalan politician

==== Q ====
- Pere Quart (1899–1986), Catalan poet
- Pere de Queralt (died 1408), Catalan diplomat

==== R ====
- Pere Rabassa (1683–1767), Catalan composer
- Pere Renom (1850–1911), Catalan politician
- Pere Riba (born 1988), Spanish tennis player and coach
- Peire Bremon Ricas Novas, 13th century Provençal troubadour
- Pere Pau Ripollès Alegre (born 1953), Spanish numismatist
- Peyre de Rius, 14th century Occitan troubadour
- Pere Riutort Mestre (1935–2021), Catalan priest
- Pere Robert i Font (born 1956), Spanish waterpolo player
- Peire Rogier, 12th century Auvergnat troubadour
- Pere Romeu (born 1993), Spanish football manager

==== S ====
- Pere Joan Sala (died 1485), Catalan revolutionary
- Pere Salvatge, 13th century Catalan troubadour
- Pere Sampol (1951–2025), Spanish Balearic politician
- Pere Serra, 14th century Catalan painter
- Pere Solé (1905–1982), Catalan footballer and manager

==== T ====
- Pere Tàpias (1946–2017), Catalan broadcaster
- Pere Tarradellas (born 1979), Spanish footballer
- Pere Tarrés i Claret (1905–1950), Catalan doctor and beatified priest
- Pere Tena Garriga (1928–2014), Catalan bishop
- Peire Guillem de Tolosa, 13th century French troubadour
- Peire Raimon de Tolosa, 12th and 13th century French troubadour
- Pere Tomàs (born 1989), Spanish basketball player
- Pere Tomàs, 14th century Catalan philosopher
- Pere Tomich, 15th century Catalan knight and historian
- Pere Toshev (1865–1912), ethnic Macedonian revolutionary
- Pere Tresfort, 15th century Catalan Occitan poet
- Pere Tutusaus (born 1990), Spanish motorcyclist

==== U ====
- Pere d'Urtx (died 1293), bishop of Urgell, prince of Andorra
- Peire d'Ussel, 12th century Limousin troubadour

==== V ====
- Peire de Valeira, 12th century Gascon troubadour
- Pèire de Vic, medieval Occitan monk and troubadour
- Peire Vidal, 12th century Occitan troubadour

==== W ====
- Pere Wihongi (born 1993), New Zealand musician, voice actor, choreographer, and kapa haka performer
- Joseph Pere Bell Wilmer (1812–1878), American bishop

=== Surname ===
- Bill Pere (born 20th century), American musician
- Emry Pere (born 1998), New Zealand rugby league footballer
- Hamiora Pere (died 1869), Māori New Zealand fighter, only New Zealander to be officially executed for treason
- Issa Laborde Dit Pere (born 2007), Kenyan alpine skier
- Mario Peré (1902–1949), Cuban baseball player
- Olivier Père (born 1971), French film executive
- Pärtel-Peeter Pere (born 1985), Estonian entrepreneur, urban strategist, and politician
- Peeter Pere (born 1957), Estonian architect
- Rangimārie Te Turuki Arikirangi Rose Pere (1937–2020), Māori New Zealand educationalist and spiritual leader
- Rongowhakaata Pere Halbert (1894–1973), Māori tribal leader and genealogist
- Vernice Wineera Pere (1938–2024), New Zealand Hawaiian poet
- Wi Pere (1837–1915), a Māori Member of Parliament in New Zealand

== See also ==
- Pere (disambiguation)
- Péré (disambiguation)
