= Peyre =

Peyre is the name or part of the name of the following communes in France:

- La Chaze-de-Peyre, in the Lozère department
- Peyre, Landes, in the Landes department
- Saint-Léger-de-Peyre, in the Lozère department
- Saint-Sauveur-de-Peyre, in the Lozère department
- Sainte-Colombe-de-Peyre, in the Lozère department
- Peyre, Aveyron is also a village, part of the commune of Comprégnac, in the Aveyron department

Persons:

- Henri Peyre (1901–1988), an American linguist of French origin
- Marie-Joseph Peyre (1730–1785), a French architect
- Natacha Peyre, a former glamour model and sex symbol
- Sully-André Peyre (1890-1961), French poet and essayist.
