= Aumont-Aubrac =

- Part of Peyre-en-Aubrac
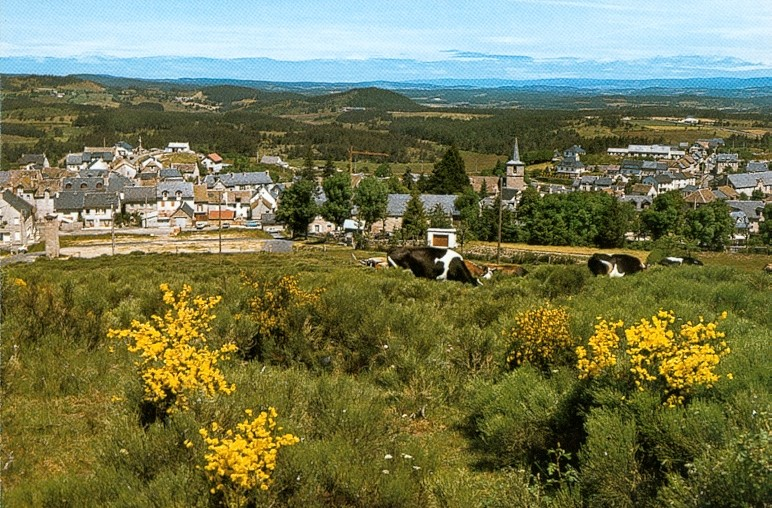
- A general view of Aumont-Aubrac

- Coat of arms
- Location of Aumont-Aubrac
- Location within France Location within Occitanie
- Coordinates: 44°43′25″N 3°17′05″E
- Country: France
- Region: Occitania
- Department: Lozère
- Arrondissement: Mende
- Canton: Aumont-Aubrac
- Commune: Peyre-en-Aubrac
- Area^{1}: 26.53 km^{2} (10.24 sq mi)
- Elevation: 1,041 m (3,415 ft)
- Highest elevation: 1,165 m (3,822 ft)
- Lowest elevation: 970 m (3,180 ft)
- Population (2022): 1,030
  - Density: 38.8/km^{2} (101/sq mi)
- Time zone: UTC+01:00 (CET)
  - Summer (DST): UTC+02:00 (CEST)
- Postal code: 48130
- ^{1} French Land Register data, which excludes lakes, ponds, glaciers > 1 km^{2} (0.386 sq mi or 247 acres) and river estuaries.

Aumont-Aubrac (French pronunciation: [omɔ̃ obʁak]; Occitan: Autmont d'Aubrac or Z-Autmont d'Aubrac) is a former commune in the Lozère department in the Occitanie region of southern France. On 1 January 2017, it was merged into the new commune Peyre-en-Aubrac.

== Geography ==
Aumont-Aubrac is located some 12 km south of Saint-Chély-d'Apcher and some 35 km north by north-west of Mende. Access to the commune is by the A75 autoroute which passes through the length of the commune from north to south with Exit 35 north of the town and Exit 36 south of the town. Access to the town is by road D809 from Saint-Chély-d'Apcher in the north, intersecting Exit 35 on the A75 and continuing south to the village then onwards parallel to the A75. The D987 goes west from the village to Malbouzon. The D50 goes south-east from the village to Javols. The D7 goes north-east from the village to Fontans. There is a railway line running north to south with a railway station in the town. Apart from the town there are the villages of Nozieres in the north-west, and La Croix, Le Crouzet, La Chouzet, and La Chazotte south of the town. The commune is mostly farmland with some scattered forests and an urban area around the town and at La Croix.

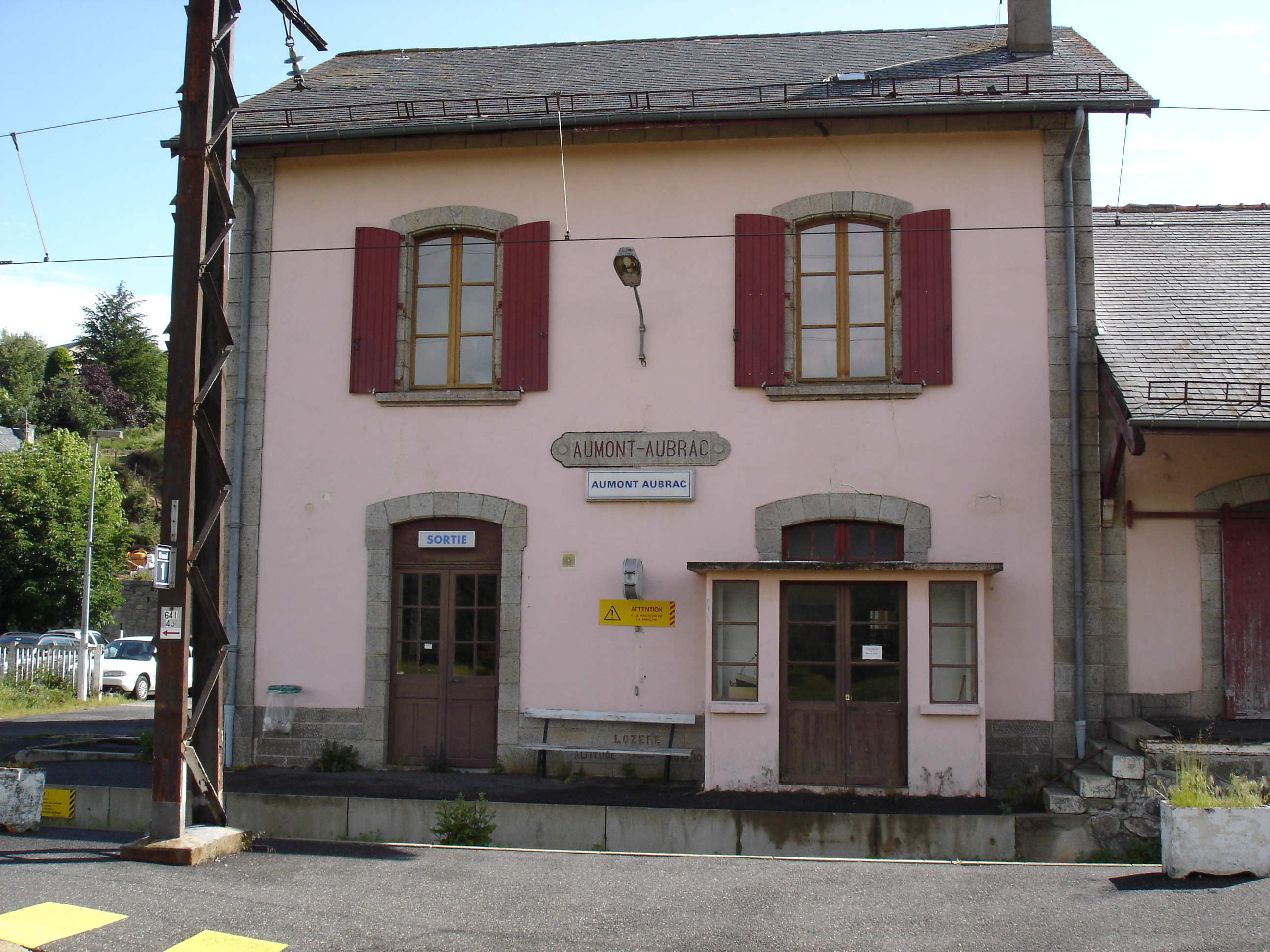
The Railway station

The Ruisseau des Rivières rises in the south of the commune and flows north gathering many tributaries to join the Rimeize just north of the commune. The Ruisseau de la Gazelle rises in the east of the commune and flows east to join the Truyère. The Ruisseau du Moulin rises in the west of the commune and flows south then east along part of the southern border to join the Triboulin south of Longuesagne. The Ruisseau du Bouchet rises in the south of the commune and flows south parallel to the railway line to join the Ruisseau du Moulin on the southern border.

The commune has had the official French label of "Village étape" since 2002 which means it meets certain criteria regarding accommodation restaurants, and other facilities for tourists.

== Toponymy ==
The village name in Occitan is Autmont (pronounced [awmu] or [zawmu] with the second form only used by Occitan speakers in the surrounding communes. The use of a prosthetic "z" before "a" or "u" is typical of the Auvergnat dialect of the region. The commune is at the southern limit of Auvergne.

The name Aumont-Aubrac is derived from the Latin altum montem meaning "high mountain".

== History ==
Aumont-Aubrac was at the crossroads of ancient routes between Auvergne and Lyon - Toulouse.

Aumont was a station on the Way of Agrippa which connected Javols to Puech Cremat.

In Roman times Aumont was part of the barony of Peyre, one of the eight baronies of Gévaudan.

=== Heraldry ===
Arms of Aumont-Aubrac	Blazon: Gules, a chateau of Argent masoned in Sable posed on a rock the same joined to base, charged with an inescutcheon of Or with an eagle Azure.

== Administration ==
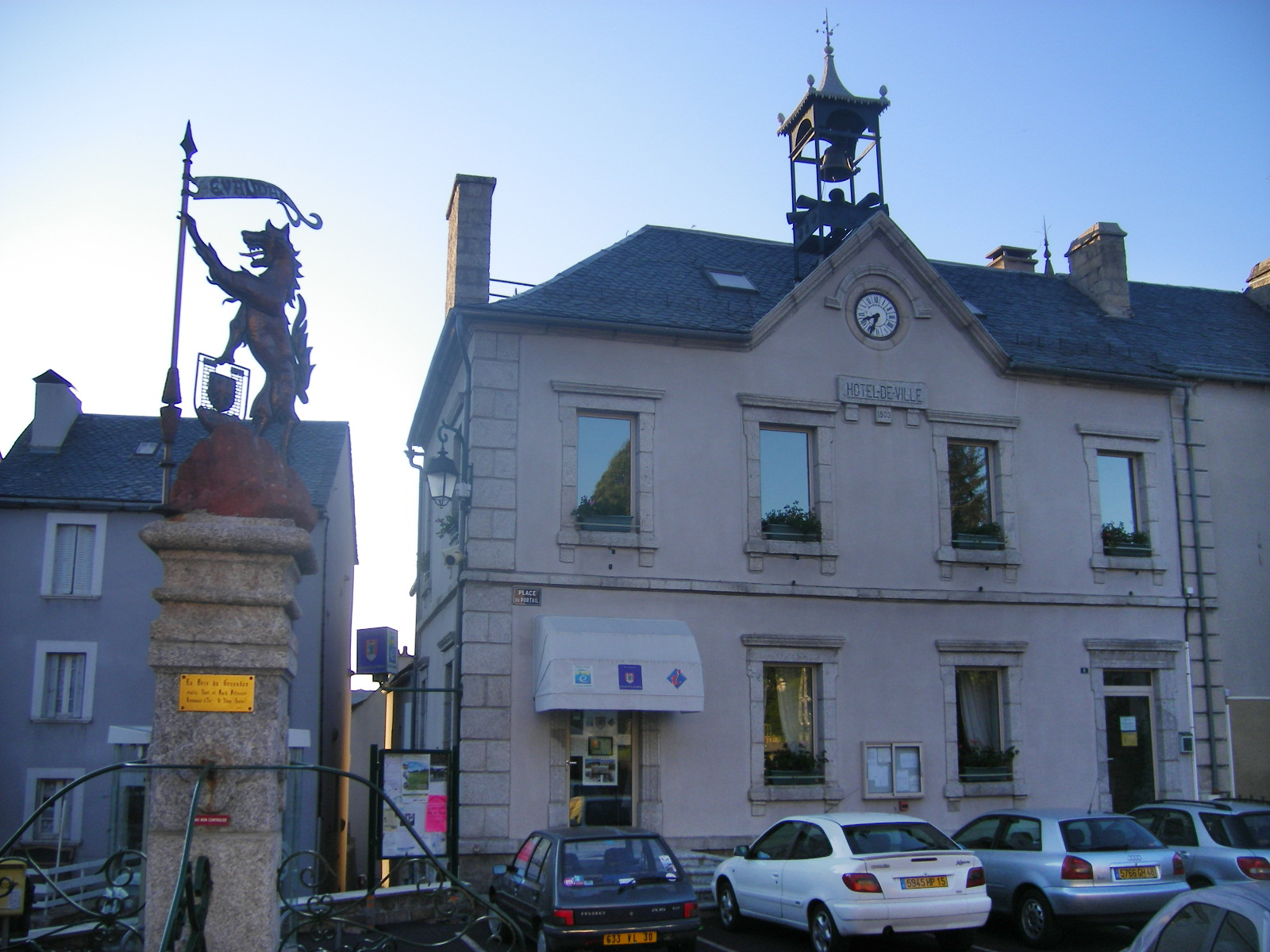
The Town Hall and the fountain with the Beast of Gevaudan

List of Successive Mayors

From	To	Name	Party	Position
2001	2017	Alain Astruc	UMP	General Councillor

== Demography ==
The inhabitants of the commune are known as Aumonais or Aumonaises in French.

Historical population

Year	Pop.	±% p.a.
1793	928	—
1800	919	−0.14%
1806	1,020	+1.75%
1821	1,007	−0.09%
1831	1,002	−0.05%
1836	1,020	+0.36%
1841	1,083	+1.21%
1846	1,039	−0.83%
1851	1,075	+0.68%
1856	1,077	+0.04%
1861	1,007	−1.34%
1866	999	−0.16%
1872	1,038	+0.64%
1876	1,055	+0.41%
1881	1,246	+3.38%
1886	1,161	−1.40%
1891	1,263	+1.70%
1896	1,298	+0.55%

Year	Pop.	±% p.a.
1901	1,282	−0.25%
1906	1,318	+0.56%
1911	1,357	+0.58%
1921	1,226	−1.01%
1926	1,173	−0.88%
1931	1,095	−1.37%
1936	1,200	+1.85%
1946	1,113	−0.75%
1954	1,010	−1.21%
1962	1,116	+1.26%
1968	1,037	−1.22%
1975	1,034	−0.04%
1982	1,049	+0.21%
1990	1,050	+0.01%
1999	1,031	−0.20%
2007	1,099	+0.80%
2012	1,097	−0.04%
2022	1,030	−0.63%

Source: EHESS and INSEE

== Culture and heritage ==
=== Civil heritage ===
The town was once fortified and has houses dating to the 16th and 17th centuries with stone facades and ground floors opening into vaulted arches. Over a window niche in one house there is a carved stone, possibly from the priory, which has a design of either a swastika or a JHS (Jesus Hominum Salvator "Jesus, Saviour of Men") Christogram.

From the Fountain in the Rue de l'Eglise there is a walk along the Rue du Barri-haut (barri is an Occitan word referring to a suburb) to the Place de la Croix (formerly a mission in the 19th century), the Chemin Royal, and the Place du Cloitre.

There is also a statue of the Beast of Gévaudan.

There are several items that are registered as historical objects:

- Wood panelling in the Maison Reversat (17th century)
- The War memorial (1919)

=== Religious heritage ===
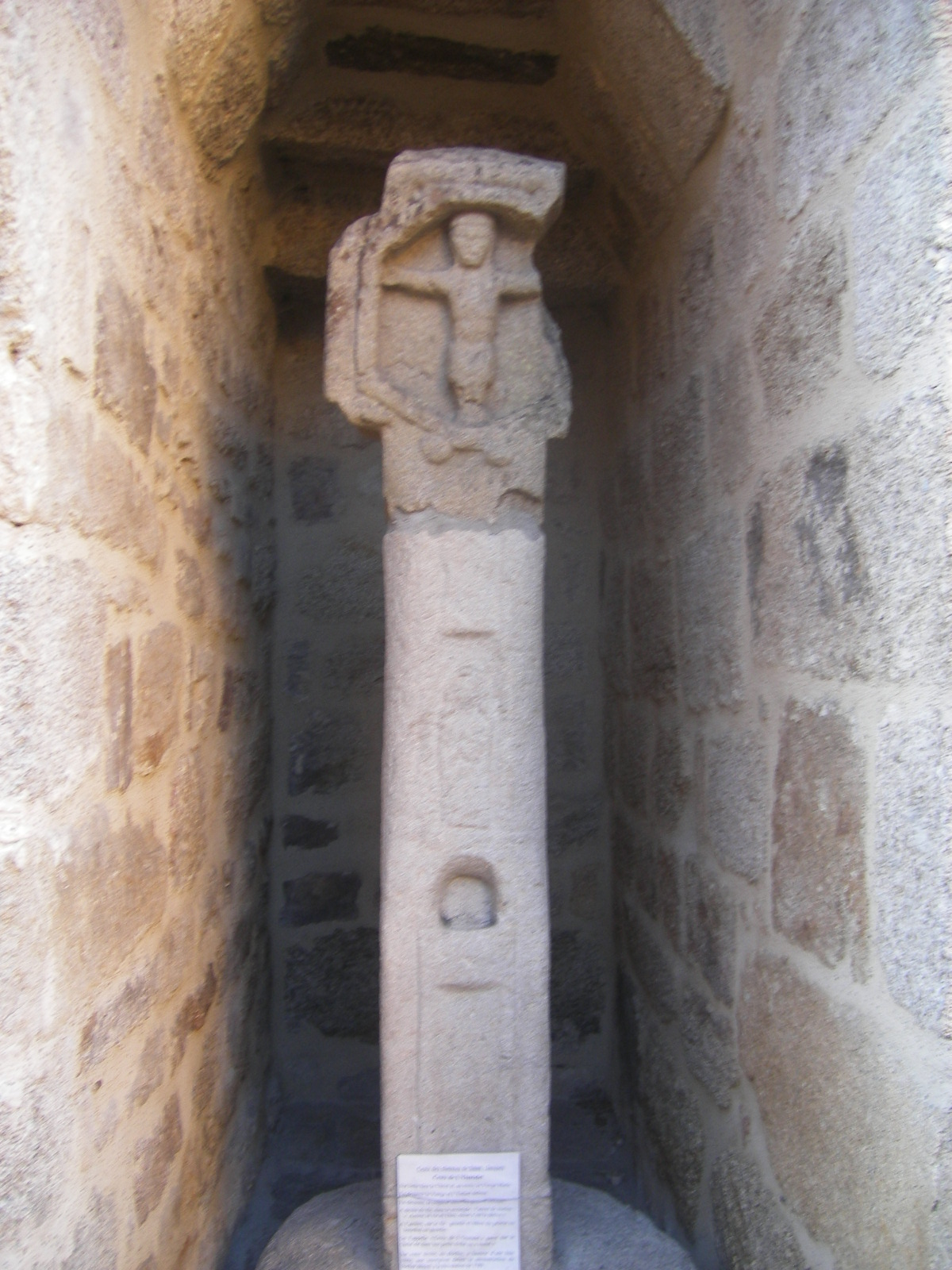
The ancient Cross

Saint-Étienne church was a former Benedictine priory dating back to 1061, attested in 1123 as being in the heart of the barony of Peyre. Much altered in the 12th and 13th centuries, it has retained its Romanesque choir and several Gothic side chapels. The Chevet is in a cul-de-four design with broken ribs in the arch. Inside there are carved capitals of columns resting on the light recesses. Other lighting recesses have human figures at the bottom of the chapel ribs and those of the nave. The furniture and stained glass are modern.

The Saint-Etienne parish church contains many items that are registered as historical objects:

- A Painting: Virgin in a Chair (18th century)
- A Chasuble, a Deacon's Stole, a Chalice cover, a corporal purse, and a Maniple (19th century)
- A Cope (19th century)
- A Reliquary (17th century)
- A Collection Plate (18th century)
- A Reliquary (17th century)
- 8 Palls (17th century)
- A Chasuble, a Maniple, and a Stole (19th century)
- A Chasuble, a Stole, a Maniple, and a Chalice cover (18th century)
- A Chasuble, a Stole, a Maniple, and a corporal purse (19th century)
- A Chalice with Paten (19th century)

Above the Place du Foirail is the monument of the Sacred Heart which is a statue of Jesus, known as the statue of "Christ the King", several metres high dominating the village on a hill named Truc del Fabre. The statue was the work of a sculptor called Marcel Courbier and was erected in 1946 by the village priest. It commemorates the fact that the Second World War had not resulted in any casualties in the village. Every year in summer there is a mass at the foot of the statue.

There are many religious items registered as historical objects in the commune:

- A Cross in the Presbytery (17th-18th centuries)
- A Mysterious Stone in the Saint-Privat Church

== Picture Gallery ==
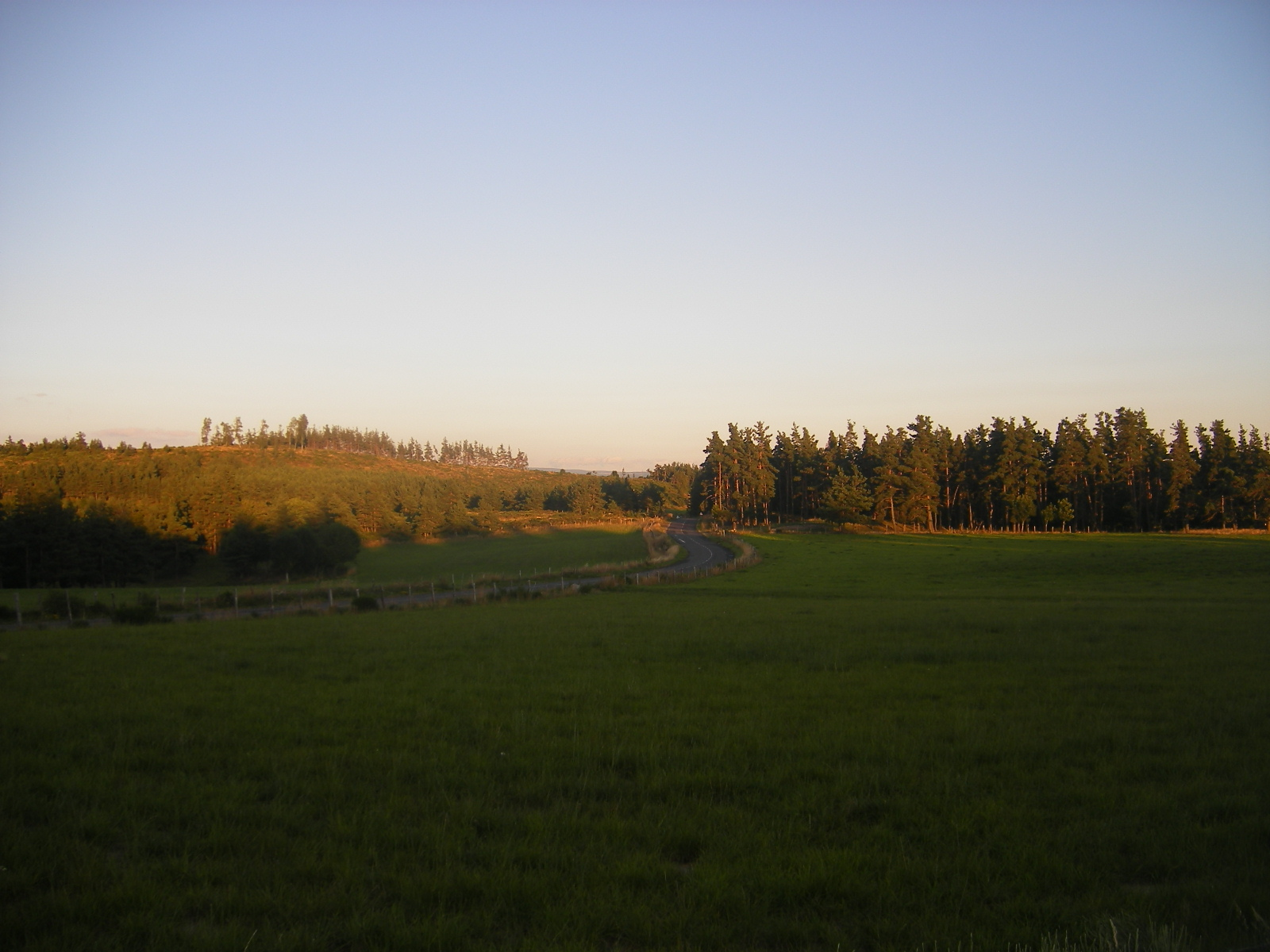
Landscape between Javols and Aumont-Aubrac

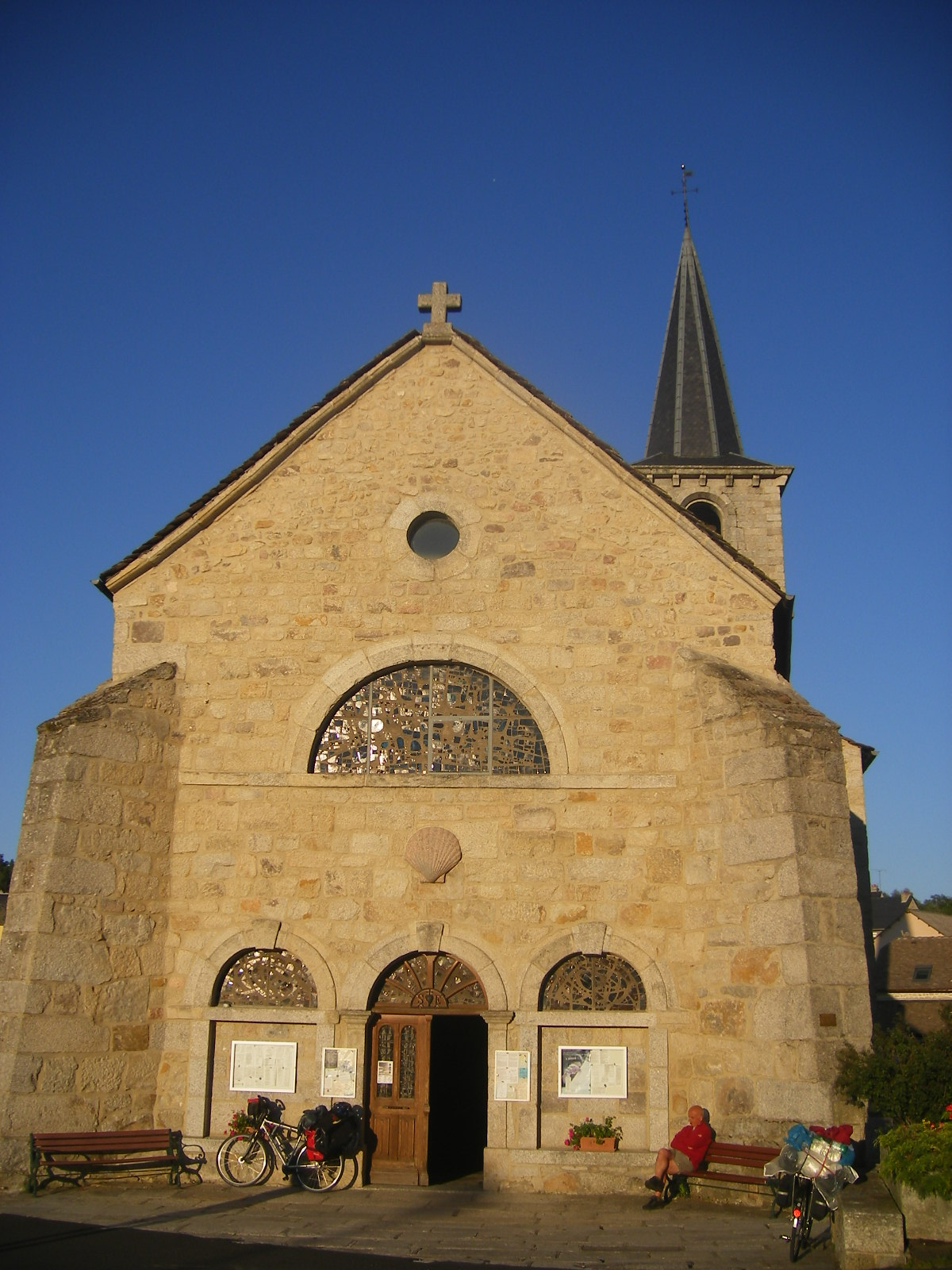
The church

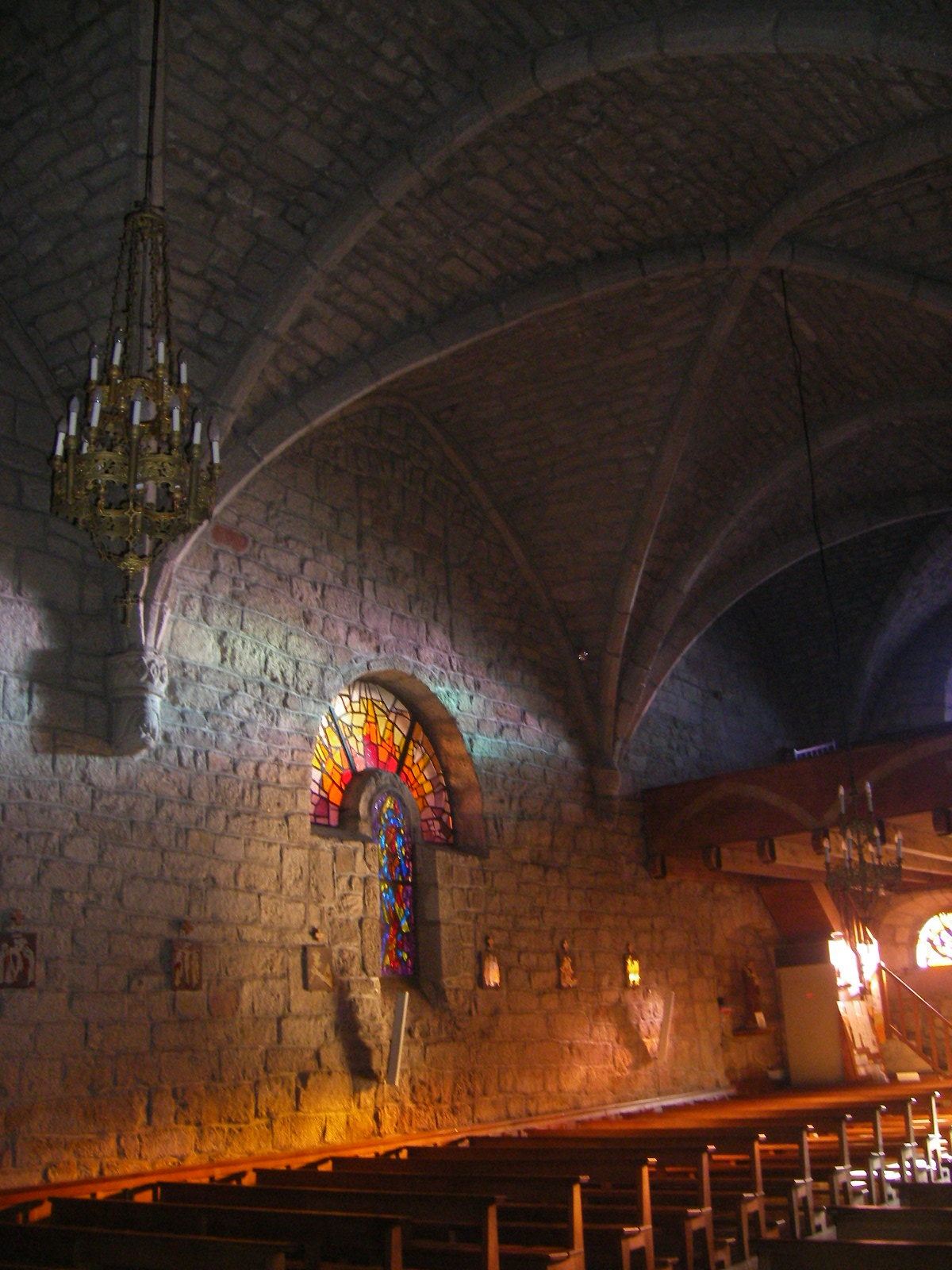
Interior of the Church

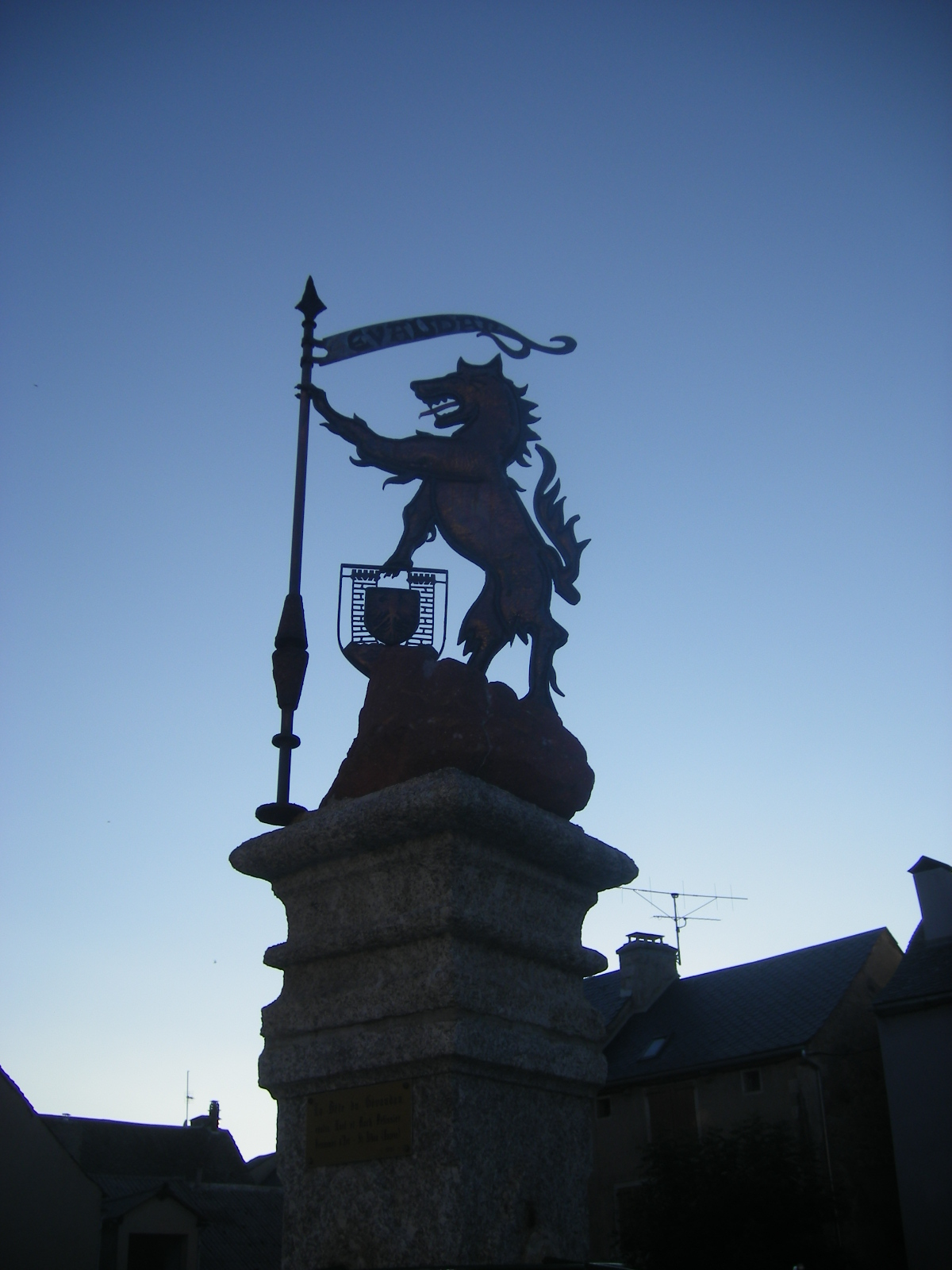
The Beast of Gévaudan

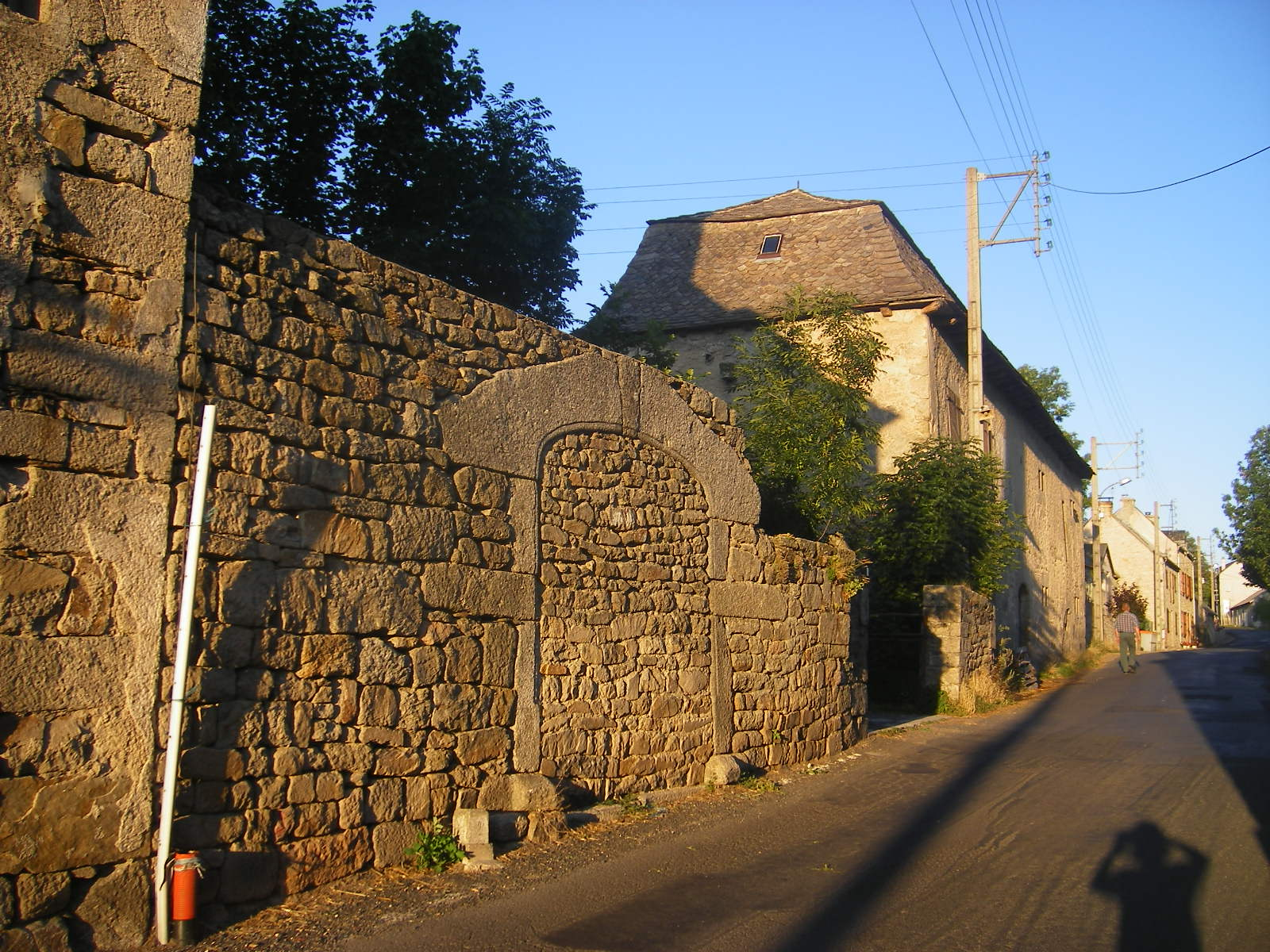
Remains of fortifications

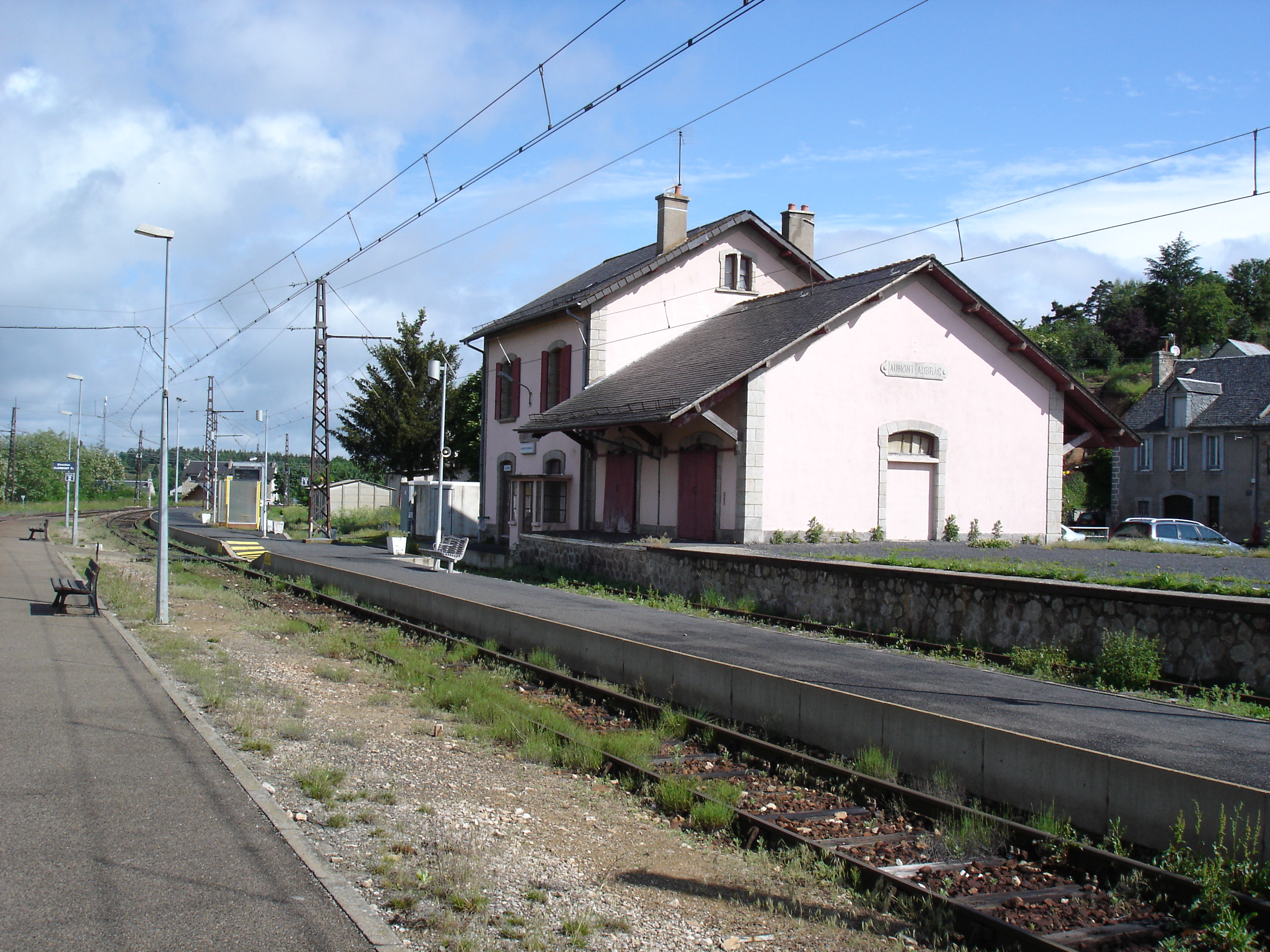
The railway station

== Notable people linked to the commune ==
- Émile Osty (1887-1981), canon, author of a famous translation of the Bible. He came to spend his holidays at Aumont every year and it was where he wanted to be buried.
- Jean Lartéguy, born in 1920, writer and journalist.
- Didier Barbelivien, born in 1954, songwriter.

== The Way of Saint James ==
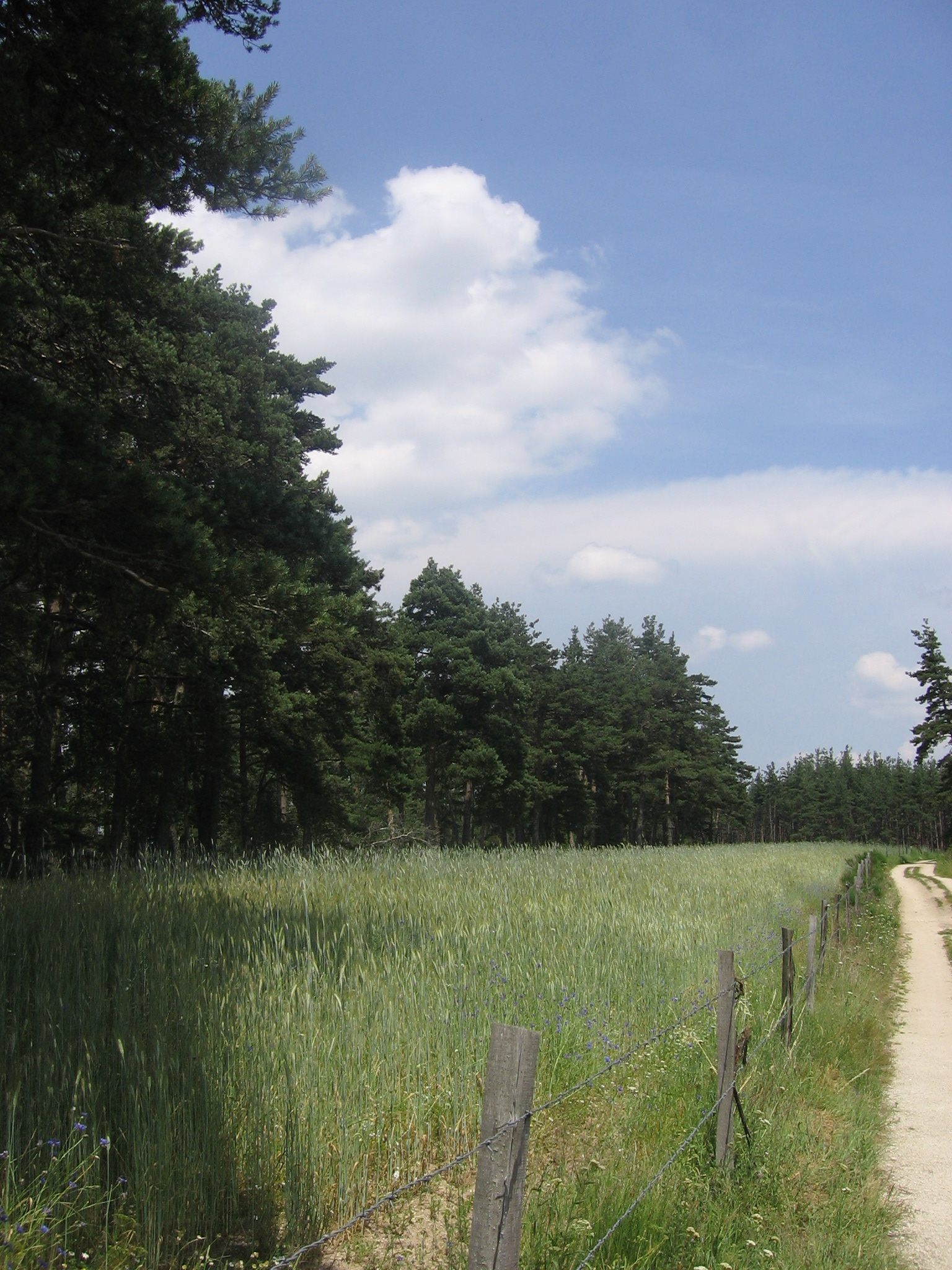
The Way of St. James

Aumont-Aubrac is located on the Via Podiensis, on the Way of St. James, an essential stage for crossing the Aubrac mountains.

The Way comes from Saint-Alban-sur-Limagnole and the next commune is Malbouzon.

== See also ==
- Communes of the Lozère department
