= Directorate-General for Traffic =

Spanish government department

Directorate-General of Traffic
- Dirección General de Tráfico

Department overview
- Formed: July 30, 1959; 67 years ago
- Type: Autonomous agency
- Jurisdiction: Government of Spain
- Headquarters: Madrid, Spain
- Annual budget: € 980 million, 2023
- Deputy Minister responsible: Luis Aguilera Ruiz, Under Secretary of the Interior
- Department executive: Pere Navarro Olivella, Director-General
- Parent department: Undersecretariat of the Interior (Ministry of the Interior)
- Key document: Law 47/59
- Website: www.dgt.es

The Directorate-General for Traffic (Spanish: Dirección General de Tráfico, DGT) is a component of the Spanish Department of the Interior responsible for the execution of the government's road policy in the Spanish road transport network. The DGT is both an administrative body and an autonomous agency, acting as Central Traffic Headquarters (Spanish: Jefatura Central de Tráfico, JCT).

== Organisation ==
The DGT is made up 50 provincial headquarters, one for each province, two local headquarters in Ceuta and Melilla and 14 local offices (Alcorcón, Alzira, Cartagena, Fuerteventura, Gijón, Ibiza, Lanzarote, La Línea de la Concepción, Menorca, La Palma, Sabadell, Santiago de Compostela and Talavera de la Reina).

=== Director-general ===
The Director-General is a civil servant who is responsible for the day-to-day operations of the DGT. The current director-general is Pere Navarro Olivella. Navarro Olivella already served as Director-General for Traffic between 2004 and 2012.

==== Former directors general ====
1. Carlos Muñoz-Repiso y Vaca (1971-1974)
2. José Ignacio San Martín López (1974-1976)
3. Jesús García Siso (1976-1978)
4. José María Fernández Cuevas (1978-1980)
5. Antonio Ramón Bernabéu González (1980-1982)
6. José Luis Martín Palacín (1982-1986)
7. David León Blanco (1986-1987)
8. Rosa de Lima Manzano Gete (1987-1988)
9. Miguel María Muñoz Medina (1988-1996)
10. Carlos Muñoz-Repiso Izaguirre (1996-2004)
11. Pere Navarro Olivella (2004-2012)
12. María Seguí Gómez (2012-2016)
13. Cristóbal Cremades Rodríguez (2016-2016)
14. Gregorio Serrano (2016-2018)
15. Pere Navarro Olivella (2018–present)
