= Prinsuéjols =

- Part of Saint-Bonnet-Laval
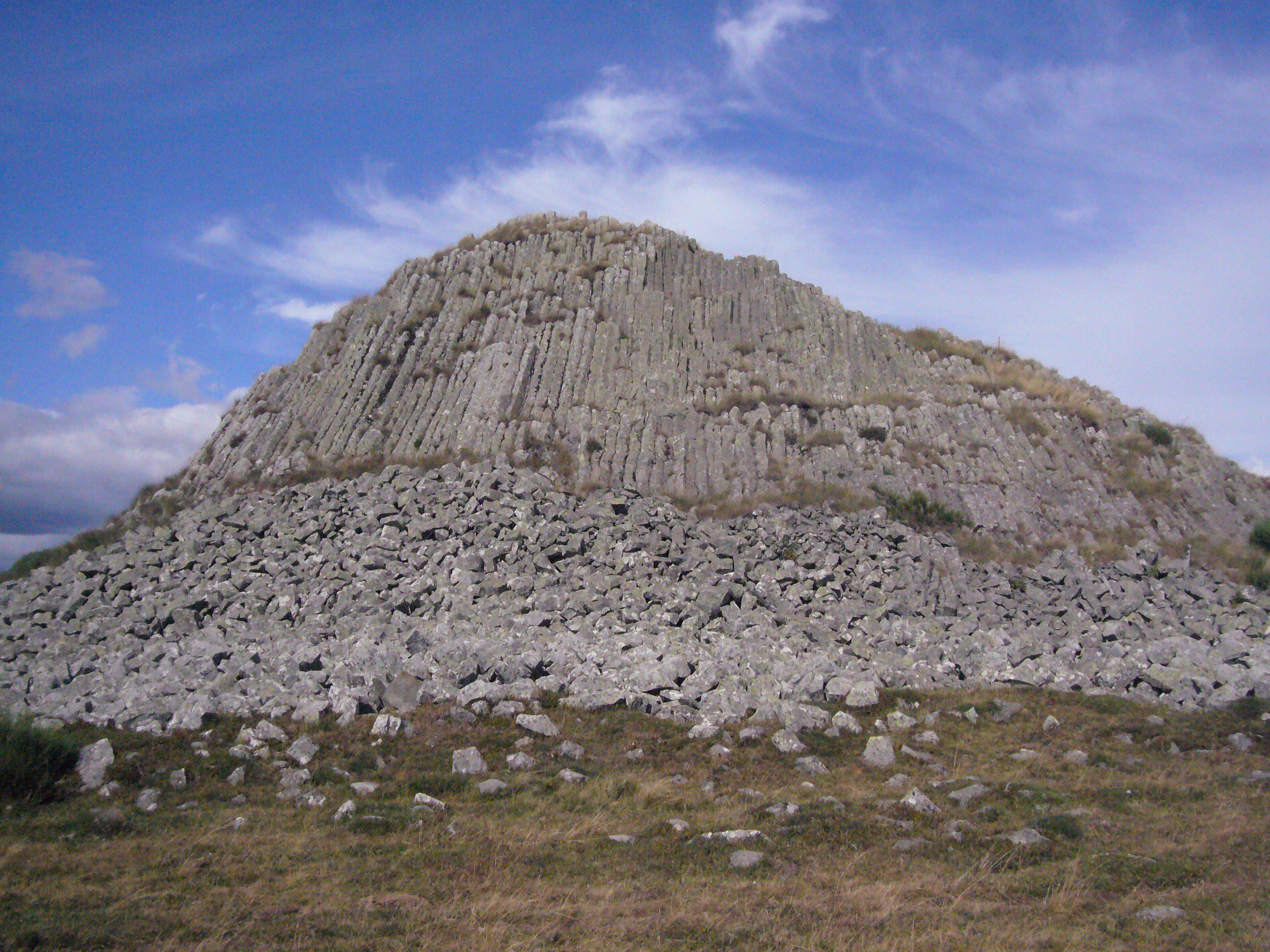
- The Truc des Coucuts in Prinsuéjols, a volcanic rock with columnar basalt, which reaches a height of 1,286 m (4,219 ft)
- Location of Prinsuéjols
- Location within France Location within Occitanie
- Coordinates: 44°40′31″N 3°10′10″E
- Country: France
- Region: Occitania
- Department: Lozère
- Arrondissement: Mende
- Canton: Aumont-Aubrac
- Commune: Saint-Bonnet-Laval
- Area^{1}: 42.96 km^{2} (16.59 sq mi)
- Elevation: 1,150 m (3,770 ft)
- Highest elevation: 1,286 m (4,219 ft)
- Lowest elevation: 1,084 m (3,556 ft)
- Population (2022): 137
  - Density: 3.19/km^{2} (8.26/sq mi)
- Time zone: UTC+01:00 (CET)
  - Summer (DST): UTC+02:00 (CEST)
- Postal code: 48100
- ^{1} French Land Register data, which excludes lakes, ponds, glaciers > 1 km^{2} (0.386 sq mi or 247 acres) and river estuaries.

Prinsuéjols (French pronunciation: [pʁɛ̃sɥeʒɔl]; Occitan: Prensuèjols) was a commune in the Lozère department in southern France. On 1 January 2017, it was merged into the new commune Prinsuéjols-Malbouzon. Its population was 137 in 2022.

== See also ==
- Communes of the Lozère department
