= Valencian Library =

Library in Valencia, Spain

Coordinates: 39.4993°N 0.3691°W

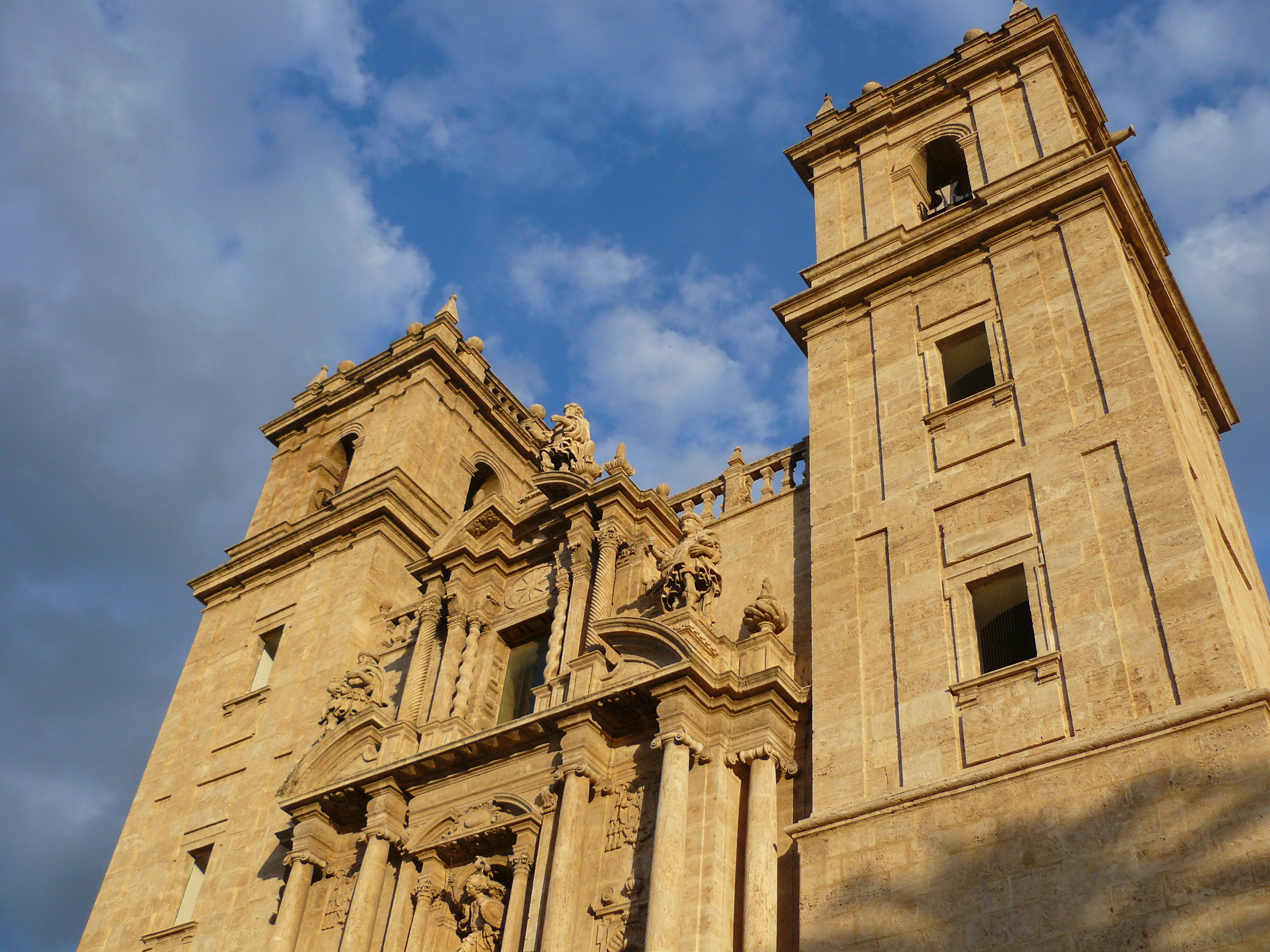
Sanmigueldelosreyesvalencia

The Nicolau Primitiu Valencian Library (Spanish: Biblioteca Valenciana Nicolau Primitiu) is a library for the Comunidad Valenciana. It’s the headquarters of the Valencian Library System and is the library centre of the Generalitat and basic bibliographic deposit of the Comunidad. Its mission is to collect, preserve and disseminates Valencian heritage and printed, audio, and visual heritage of the Comunidad Valenciana.

== History ==
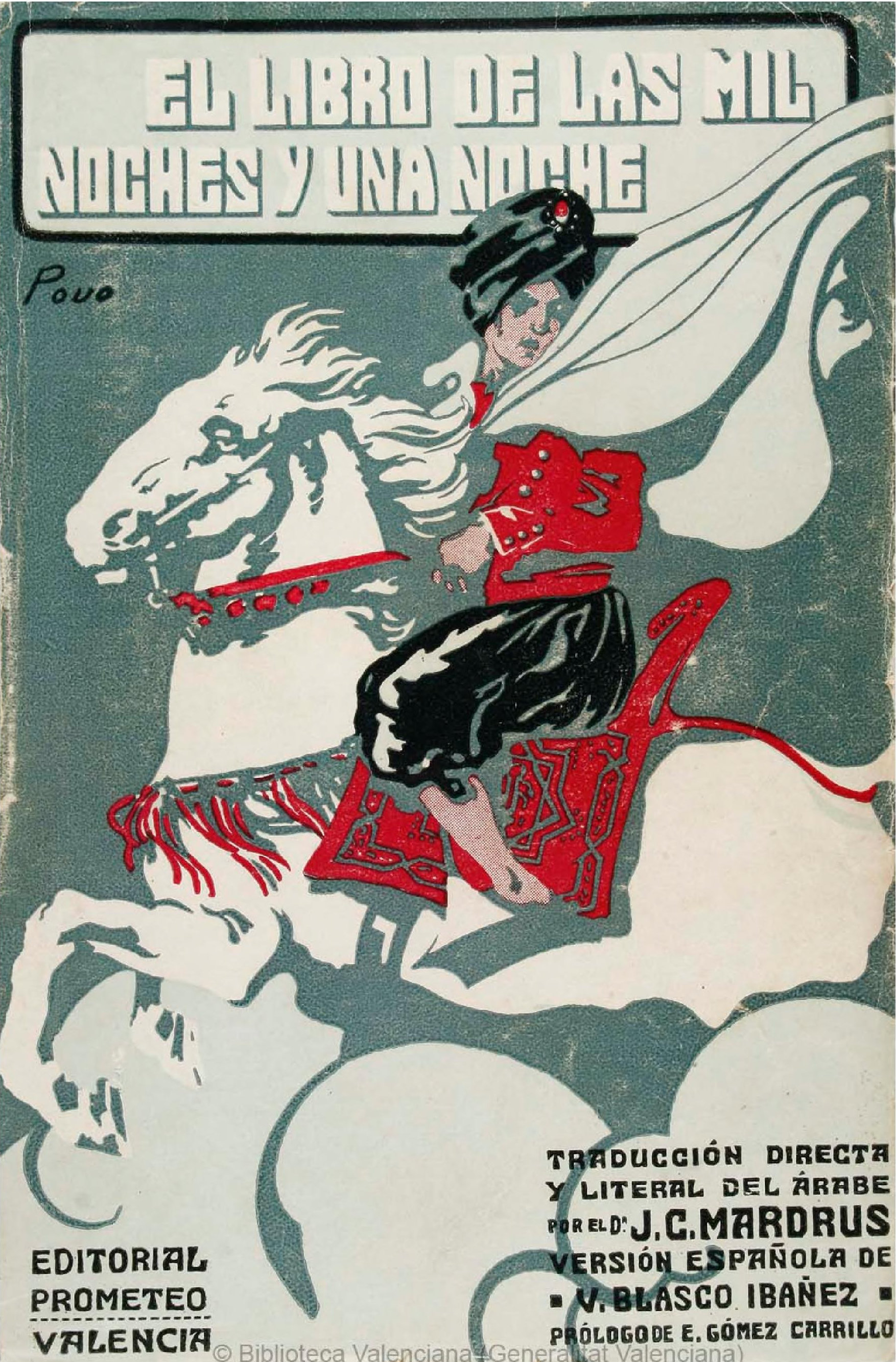
"Biblioteca Valenciana" markings at bottom of book cover

The library began with a donation by the library of D. Nicolau Primitiu Gómez Serrano in 1979, in which the library acquired a collection integrated by incunabula and editions of the 16th, 17th and 18th centuries. This library attempted to gather works from Valencian authors, Valencian themed or produced. Biblioteca Valenciana was created as a library centre of the Generalitat and basic bibliographic repository of Valenciana.

Until 2000, the library was housed in the building of the ‘Hospital General’, sharing space with the Public Provincial Library of Valencia. In 1995, the Generalitat decided that the permanent seat would be the ‘San Miguel de los Reyes’ Monastir, and after rehabilitation (between 1995 and 1999), in 2000 it was established as the seat. In 2010 it changed its name to Biblioteca Valenciana Nicolau Primitiu.

== Funds ==
The library holds almost a million documents and has an automated and searchable catalogue. The collection spans parchment and paper to electronic supports, from the 13th century through the 21st century.

Funding includes Pere Maria Orts i Bosch, Ignacio Soldevila, Jesús Martínez Guerricabeitia, Familia Ventura, Guillermina Medrano y Rafael Supervía, and Pedro Nácher. Other collections include the Colección Cervantina de Francesc Martínez i Martínez, representing Cervantes’s works.

The Biblioteca Valenciana has manuscript collections that include the municipal charter of Sant Mateu from 1274, and 53 volumes of incunabula and works from the sixteenth through eighteenth centuries.

The Hemeroteca Collection includes more than 14,000 titles ranging from writing to graphic comic press.
