= Prinsuéjols-Malbouzon =

- Commune
- Location of Prinsuéjols-Malbouzon
- Location within France Location within Occitanie
- Coordinates: 44°42′07″N 3°08′10″E
- Country: France
- Region: Occitania
- Department: Lozère
- Arrondissement: Mende
- Canton: Peyre en Aubrac
- Intercommunality: Hautes Terres de l'Aubrac

Government
  - Mayor (2020–2026): Xavier Poudevigne
- Area^{1}: 57.22 km^{2} (22.09 sq mi)
- Population (2023): 246
  - Density: 4.30/km^{2} (11.1/sq mi)
- Time zone: UTC+01:00 (CET)
  - Summer (DST): UTC+02:00 (CEST)
- INSEE/Postal code: 48087 /48100, 48270
- ^{1} French Land Register data, which excludes lakes, ponds, glaciers > 1 km^{2} (0.386 sq mi or 247 acres) and river estuaries.

Prinsuéjols-Malbouzon (French pronunciation: [pʁɛ̃sɥeʒɔl malbuzɔ̃]; Occitan: Prensuèjols e Malboson) is a commune in the department of Lozère, southern France. The municipality was established on 1 January 2017 by merger of the former communes of Malbouzon (the seat) and Prinsuéjols.

== See also ==
- Communes of the Lozère department
