= Fau-de-Peyre =

- Part of Peyre-en-Aubrac
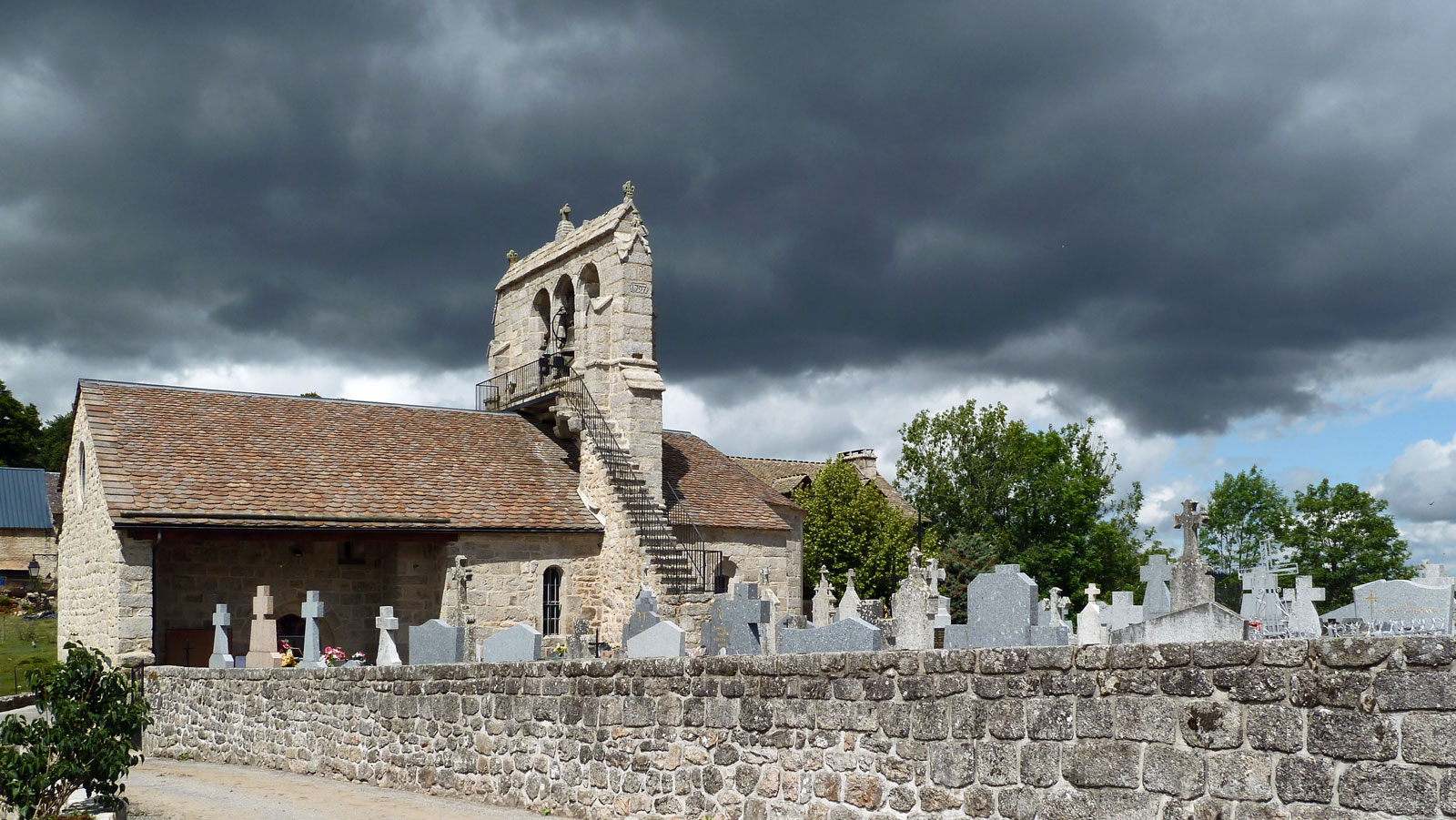
- The church in Fau-de-Peyre

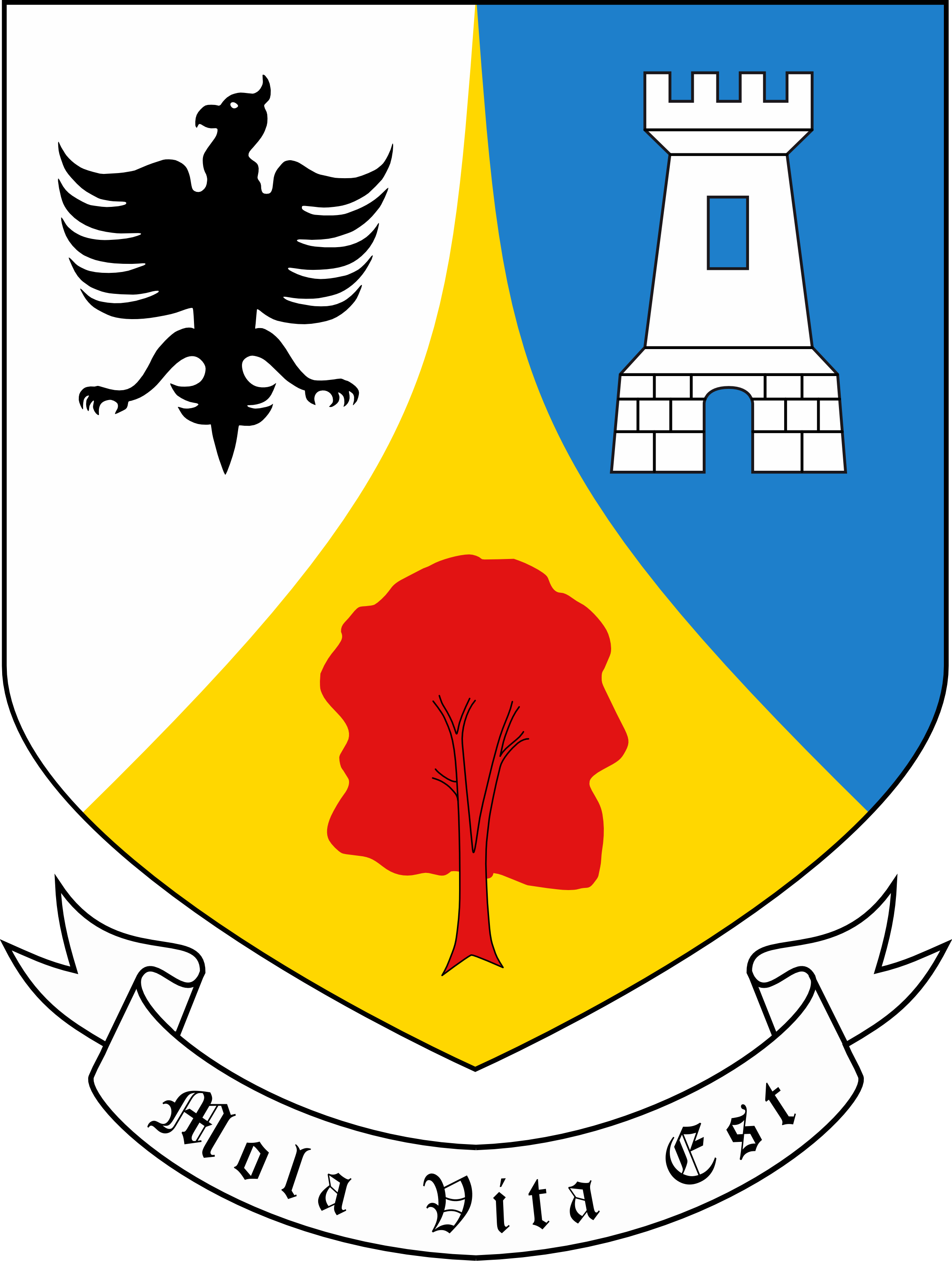
- Coat of arms
- Location of Fau-de-Peyre
- Location within France Location within Occitanie
- Coordinates: 44°44′57″N 3°13′26″E
- Country: France
- Region: Occitania
- Department: Lozère
- Arrondissement: Mende
- Canton: Aumont-Aubrac
- Commune: Peyre-en-Aubrac
- Area^{1}: 26.72 km^{2} (10.32 sq mi)
- Elevation: 1,100 m (3,600 ft)
- Highest elevation: 1,247 m (4,091 ft)
- Lowest elevation: 992 m (3,255 ft)
- Population (2022): 175
  - Density: 6.55/km^{2} (17.0/sq mi)
- Time zone: UTC+01:00 (CET)
  - Summer (DST): UTC+02:00 (CEST)
- Postal code: 48130
- ^{1} French Land Register data, which excludes lakes, ponds, glaciers > 1 km^{2} (0.386 sq mi or 247 acres) and river estuaries.

Fau-de-Peyre (French pronunciation: [fo də pɛʁ]; Occitan: Lo Fau de Peire) is a former commune in the Lozère department in southern France. On 1 January 2017, it was merged into the new commune Peyre-en-Aubrac. Its population was 175 in 2022.

== See also ==
- Communes of the Lozère department
