= Pere =

Pere may refer to:

- Pere, Hungary, a village in Borsod-Abaúj-Zemplén county
- Pere language (Nigeria), a Leko language spoken in Nigeria
- Pɛrɛ language, a Koro language spoken in Côte d'Ivoire
- Pere Ubu, American band
- De Pere, Wisconsin, a city in Brown county
- Other places in Catalan regions named after Sant Pere (disambiguation)
- Things named after Pere Marquette (disambiguation)
- People named Pere (name)

== See also ==
- Péré (disambiguation)
- French honorific title Père
