= María Seguí Gómez =

Spanish physician and Public Health expert (born 1967)

Maria Seguí Gómez
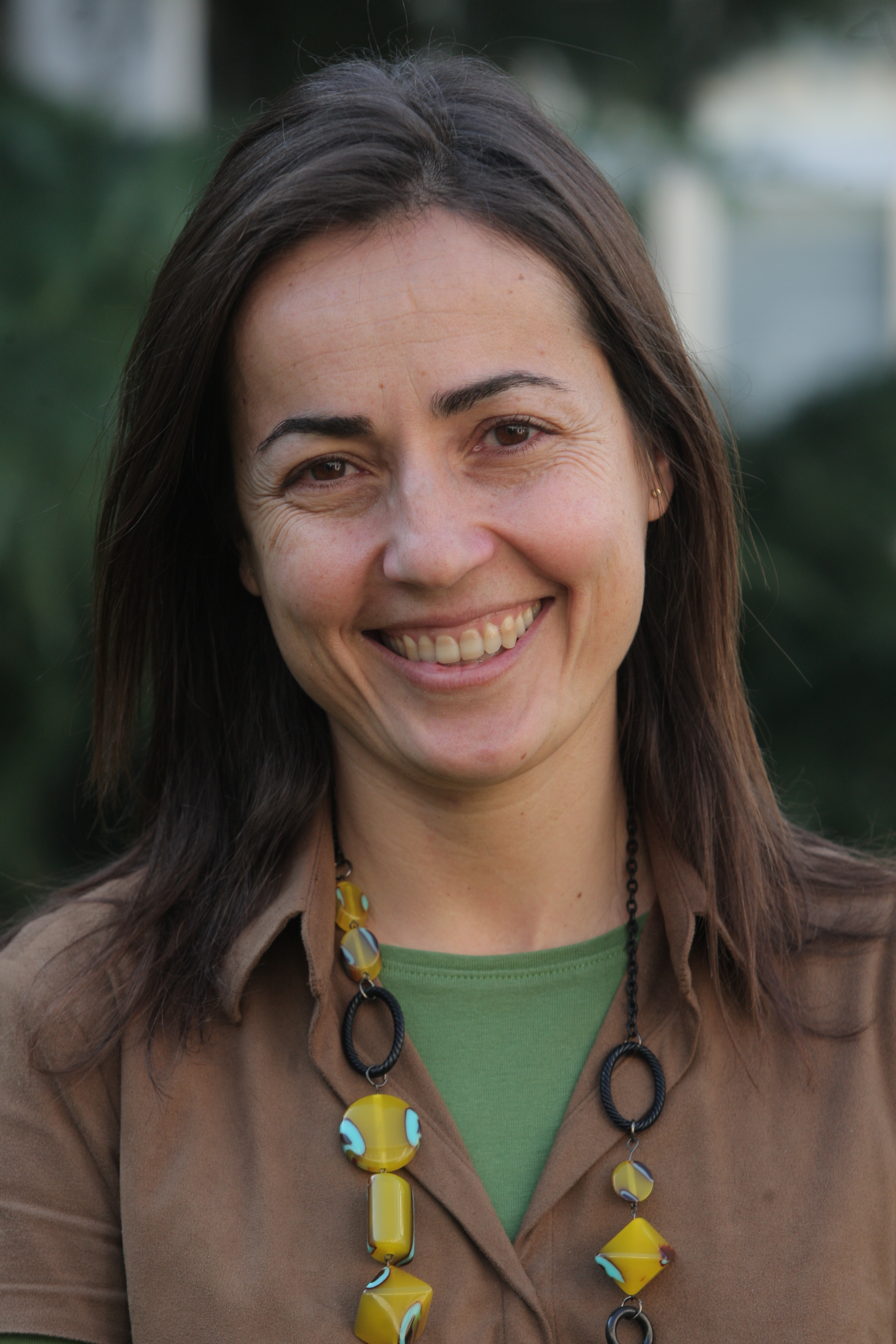
- Born: 4 September 1967 (age 58); Barcelona, Spain
- Education: University of Barcelona (MD, MPH); Harvard University (MS, ScD)
- Occupations: Physician, public health expert
- Known for: Director-General of the Directorate-General for Traffic (2012–2016)
- Awards: Ramon y Cajal Career Development Award; Elaine Woodzin Young Achiever Award; La Caixa Foundation Fellowship

Maria Segui Gomez (born September 4, 1967) is a Spanish physician and Public Health expert. She led the Directorate-General for Traffic until she resigned over an accusation of conflict of interest which was later found to be groundless.

== Life ==
Segui was born in Barcelona in 1967. She studied for a degree in Medicine and General Surgery at the University of Barcelona, where she later completed a master's degree in Public Health. Segui also has a master's and doctorate in Sciences in Health Policy from Harvard University.

Segui taught at the University of Navarra in Pamplona, which presided over the European Center for Injury Prevention. It was announced on 22 July 2011 that she had been appointed as Director General of Public Health, Substance Abuse and Consumer Affairs of the Government of Castilla-La Mancha. In February 2012, she was appointed general director of the Directorate-General for Traffic replacing Pere Navarro Olivella.

== At the directorate ==
On July 19, 2016, the Ministry of Interior started an investigation into the funding of research projects that the General Directorate of Traffic had granted to the University of Zaragoza. Her husband worked at this university. The allocation of 49,950 euros, was made without a public tender for traffic research projects.

Three days later she resigned from her position. The Government of Spain, through its spokesman Soraya Sáenz de Santamaría, thanked her work in the "significant reduction of accidents". The official figures published by the Directorate General of Traffic show the lowest fatality figures in Spain during her tenure (2012: 1903 fatalities; 2013: 1680 fatalities; 2014: 1688 fatalities; 2015: 1689 fatalities).

In March 2017, the Office of Conflicts of Interest of the Ministry of Finance determined that there was no violation in the award of the contract to the University of Zaragoza as there was no evidence that her husband benefited in any way.

== Awards ==
- Ramon y Cajal Career Development Award
- Spanish Ministry of Science and Technology 2002–2006.
- Elaine Woodzin Young Achiever Award, Association for the Advancement of Automotive Medicine, 2002.
- Fellowship for Post-graduate Students. La Caixa Foundation, 1994–1997.
- Fellowship for the Training of Investigators. Presidency Department of the Autonomous Government of Catalonia, 1993–1994.
- Outstanding Student Award. Harvard Center for Risk Analysis
