= Peyre en Aubrac =

- Commune
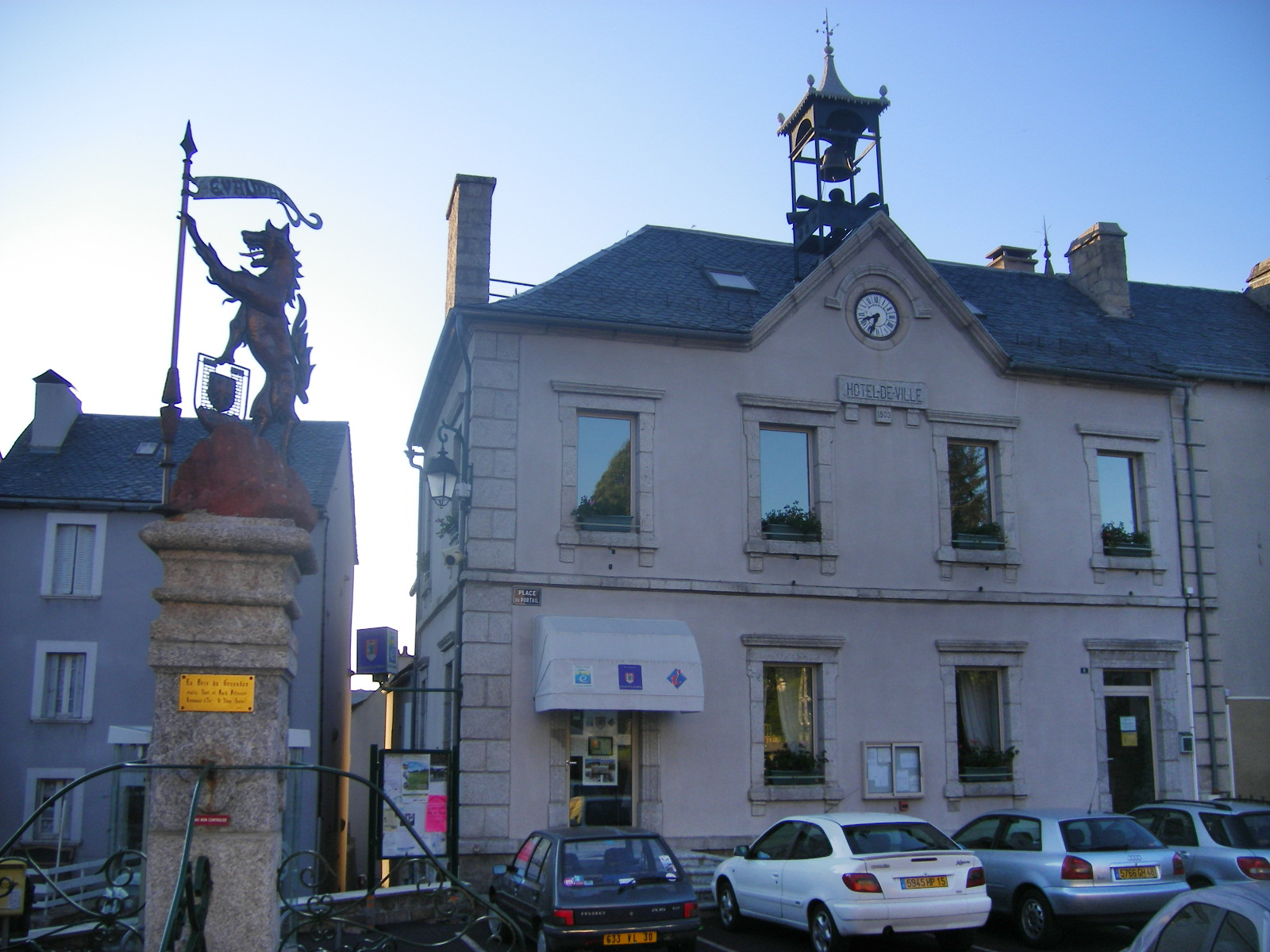
- Peyre en Aubrac Town hall
- Location of Peyre en Aubrac
- Location within France Location within Occitanie
- Coordinates: 44°43′23″N 3°17′02″E
- Country: France
- Region: Occitania
- Department: Lozère
- Arrondissement: Mende
- Canton: Peyre en Aubrac
- Intercommunality: Hautes Terres de l'Aubrac
- Area^{1}: 153.30 km^{2} (59.19 sq mi)
- Population (2023): 2,296
  - Density: 14.98/km^{2} (38.79/sq mi)
- Time zone: UTC+01:00 (CET)
  - Summer (DST): UTC+02:00 (CEST)
- INSEE/Postal code: 48009 /48130
- ^{1} French Land Register data, which excludes lakes, ponds, glaciers > 1 km^{2} (0.386 sq mi or 247 acres) and river estuaries.

Peyre en Aubrac (Occitan: Peire en Aubrac) is a commune in the department of Lozère, southern France. The municipality was established on 1 January 2017 by merger of the former communes of Aumont-Aubrac (the seat), La Chaze-de-Peyre, Fau-de-Peyre, Javols, Sainte-Colombe-de-Peyre and Saint-Sauveur-de-Peyre.

== Population ==
Population data refer to the commune in its geography as of January 2025.

Historical population
Year	Pop.	±% p.a.
1968	2,628	—
1975	2,489	−0.77%
1982	2,246	−1.46%
1990	2,098	−0.85%
1999	2,147	+0.26%
2007	2,334	+1.05%
2012	2,392	+0.49%
2017	2,287	−0.89%
2023	2,296	+0.07%
Source: INSEE

== See also ==
- Communes of the Lozère department
