= Pedro Robert =

Spanish water polo player (born 1956)

Personal information
- Nationality: Spanish
- Born: 11 July 1956 (age 69) Barcelona, Spain

Sport
- Sport: Water polo
Medal record
Representing Spain
European Championships
Bronze medal – third place	1983 Rome	Team competition
Mediterranean Games
Bronze medal – third place	1975 Algiers	Team competition

Pedro Robert (born 11 July 1956) is a Spanish water polo player. He competed at the 1980 Summer Olympics, the 1984 Summer Olympics and the 1988 Summer Olympics.
