= Sainte-Colombe-de-Peyre =

- Part of Peyre-en-Aubrac
- Coat of arms
- Location of Sainte-Colombe-de-Peyre
- Location within France Location within Occitanie
- Coordinates: 44°41′29″N 3°14′24″E
- Country: France
- Region: Occitania
- Department: Lozère
- Arrondissement: Mende
- Canton: Aumont-Aubrac
- Commune: Peyre-en-Aubrac
- Area^{1}: 21.90 km^{2} (8.46 sq mi)
- Elevation: 1,060 m (3,480 ft)
- Highest elevation: 1,258 m (4,127 ft)
- Lowest elevation: 1,018 m (3,340 ft)
- Population (2019): 188
  - Density: 8.58/km^{2} (22.2/sq mi)
- Time zone: UTC+01:00 (CET)
  - Summer (DST): UTC+02:00 (CEST)
- Postal code: 48130
- ^{1} French Land Register data, which excludes lakes, ponds, glaciers > 1 km^{2} (0.386 sq mi or 247 acres) and river estuaries.

Sainte-Colombe-de-Peyre (French pronunciation: [sɛ̃t kɔlɔ̃b də pɛʁ]; Occitan: Santa Colomba de Peire) is a former commune in the Lozère department in southern France. On January 1, 2017, it was merged into the new commune of Peyre-en-Aubrac. Its population was 188 in 2019.

== See also ==
- Communes of the Lozère department
