= Pere Navarro Olivella =

Spanish politician

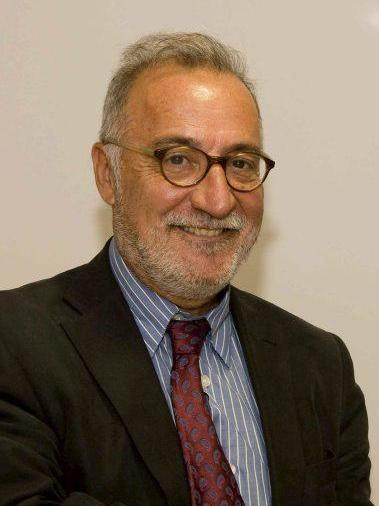
- Pere Navarro in 2010

11th and 15th Director-General for Traffic
- Incumbent
- Assumed office 30 June 2018
- Preceded by: Gregorio Serrano López
- In office 8 May 2004 – 4 February 2012
- Preceded by: Carlos Muñoz-Repiso
- Succeeded by: María Seguí Gómez

Civil Governor of Girona
- In office 1985–1996

Personal details
- Born: Pere Navarro Olivella; 25 May 1952 (age 74) Barcelona, Spain
- Party: PSC-Socialist Party
- Education: School of Industrial Engineering of Barcelona

Pere Navarro Olivella (born 25 May 1952 in Barcelona) is a Spanish civil servant and politician who serves as Director-General for Traffic since June 2018. Navarro also served at this position from 2004 to 2012.

== Early years and education ==
Navarro is an industrial engineer graduated in 1974 by the School of Industrial Engineering of Barcelona. A year later, he obtained a diploma in Business Administration by the EAE Business School. In 1977 he entered by public contest in the Superior Corps of Labour and Social Security Inspectors. He is married and has two daughters.

Later, he was appointed delegate of the Ministry of Labour of the Regional Government of Catalonia in Girona (1979-1983) and in 1983 he was appointed Chief of Staff of the Civil Governor of Barcelona until 1985, when he was appointed Civil Governor of Gerona. Navarro left the office of civil governor in 1996 and he was appointed Team Leader of the Labour and Social Security Inspectorate in the Province of Barcelona (1996-1999). Between 1999 and 2004 Navarro worked in the City Council of Barcelona, first as Director of the Transport and Circulation Service and then as Commissioner for Mobility, Transport and Circulation.

== Director-General for Traffic (First term, 2004–2012) ==
After the arrival to power of José Luis Rodríguez Zapatero he was appointed Director-General for Traffic and he served during the two Zapatero's terms with three different Interior Ministers. He briefly served under Mariano Rajoy but he was replaced in February 2012 by María Seguí Gómez. He was one of the last senior officials appointed by Zapatero to be replaced.

His term as head of the Directorate-General for Traffic is generally accepted as positive, including among his milestones the implementation of the driving license's points system and the reduction of traffic accidents by 65% (when Navarro assumed office the number of deaths by traffic accidents was 5,399, when he left was 1,903). In 2009 he was awarded the "Best Engineer of the Year" by the Official College of Industrial Engineers of Madrid (COIIM).

== After leaving the office ==
After leaving the office of Director-General, he was assigned to the Spanish Embassy in Morocco, where he served as Advisor for Labour and Social Security affairs. He left this position in 2016, and he retired from public service, taking care of his two grandchildren and practising sailing.

== Director-General for Traffic (Second term, 2018–) ==
In 2018, the new Minister of Home Affairs, Fernando Grande-Marlaska, appointed him as Director-General for Traffic.

In February 2025, he was awarded with the Silver Cross of the Order of Merit for Security.
