= Péré =

Péré may refer to:

== Places ==
- Péré, Charente-Maritime, a commune in the Charente-Maritime department
- Péré, Hautes-Pyrénées, a commune in the Hautes-Pyrénées department

== People ==
- Dahuku Péré (1953–2021), president of the National Assembly of Togo
- Essohana Péré, 20th century Togolese politician
- Raymond Charles Péré (1854–1929), French architect
- Robert Péré-Escamps (born 1956), French football manager and former player
- Wayne Péré (born 1965), American actor

== See also ==
- Pere (disambiguation)
- Pérès (plural form)
