= Fontans =

- Commune
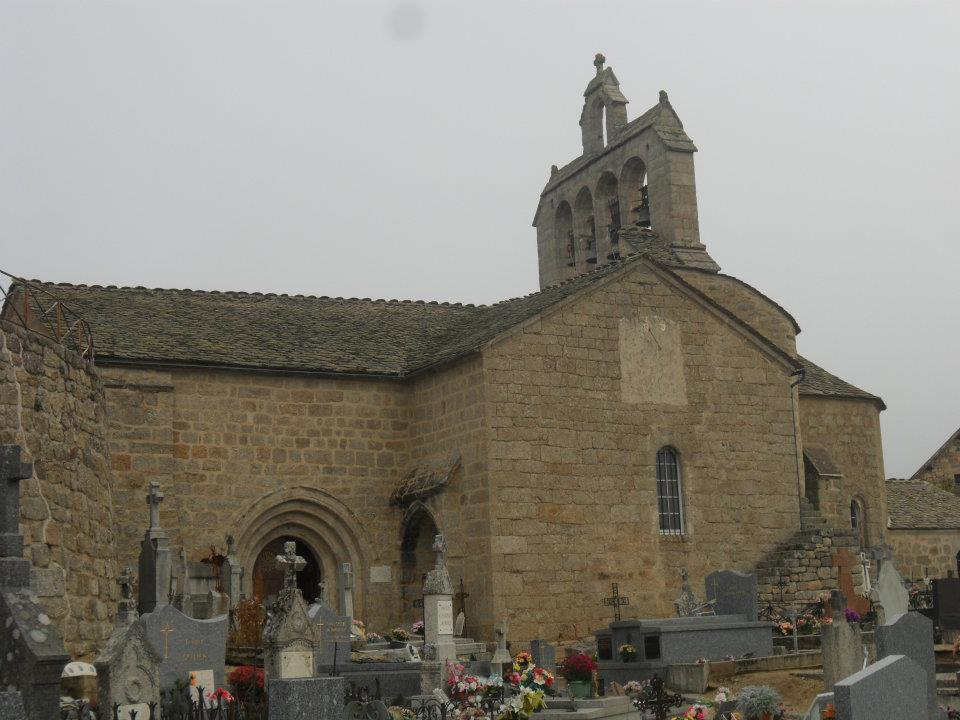
- The parish church of Saint-Pierre, in Fontans
- Location of Fontans
- Location within France Location within Occitanie
- Coordinates: 44°44′23″N 3°23′15″E
- Country: France
- Region: Occitania
- Department: Lozère
- Arrondissement: Mende
- Canton: Saint-Alban-sur-Limagnole
- Intercommunality: Terres d'Apcher-Margeride-Aubrac

Government
  - Mayor (2020–2026): Jean-Paul Vanel
- Area^{1}: 33.90 km^{2} (13.09 sq mi)
- Elevation: 1,000 m (3,300 ft)
- Highest elevation: 1,123 m (3,684 ft)
- Lowest elevation: 910 m (2,990 ft)
- Population (2023): 218
  - Density: 6.43/km^{2} (16.7/sq mi)
- Time zone: UTC+01:00 (CET)
  - Summer (DST): UTC+02:00 (CEST)
- INSEE/Postal code: 48063 /48700
- ^{1} French Land Register data, which excludes lakes, ponds, glaciers > 1 km^{2} (0.386 sq mi or 247 acres) and river estuaries.

Fontans is a commune in the Lozère department in southern France.

Its inhabitants are called Fontanains.

== Personalities ==
- Francis Bestion (born 1957), born in Fontans, was vicar general of the Diocese of Mende and has been Bishop of Tulle since December 2013.

== See also ==
- Communes of the Lozère department
