= Malbouzon =

- Part of Saint-Bonnet-Laval
- Location of Malbouzon
- Location within France Location within Occitanie
- Coordinates: 44°42′06″N 3°08′09″E
- Country: France
- Region: Occitania
- Department: Lozère
- Arrondissement: Mende
- Canton: Aumont-Aubrac
- Commune: Saint-Bonnet-Laval
- Area^{1}: 14.26 km^{2} (5.51 sq mi)
- Elevation: 1,174 m (3,852 ft)
- Highest elevation: 1,264 m (4,147 ft)
- Lowest elevation: 1,143 m (3,750 ft)
- Population (2022): 113
  - Density: 7.92/km^{2} (20.5/sq mi)
- Time zone: UTC+01:00 (CET)
  - Summer (DST): UTC+02:00 (CEST)
- Postal code: 48270
- ^{1} French Land Register data, which excludes lakes, ponds, glaciers > 1 km^{2} (0.386 sq mi or 247 acres) and river estuaries.

Malbouzon (French pronunciation: [malbuzɔ̃]; Occitan: Malboson) is a former commune in the Lozère department in southern France. On 1 January 2017, it was merged into the new commune Prinsuéjols-Malbouzon.

== See also ==
- Communes of the Lozère department
