= Sully-André Peyre =

French poet and essayist

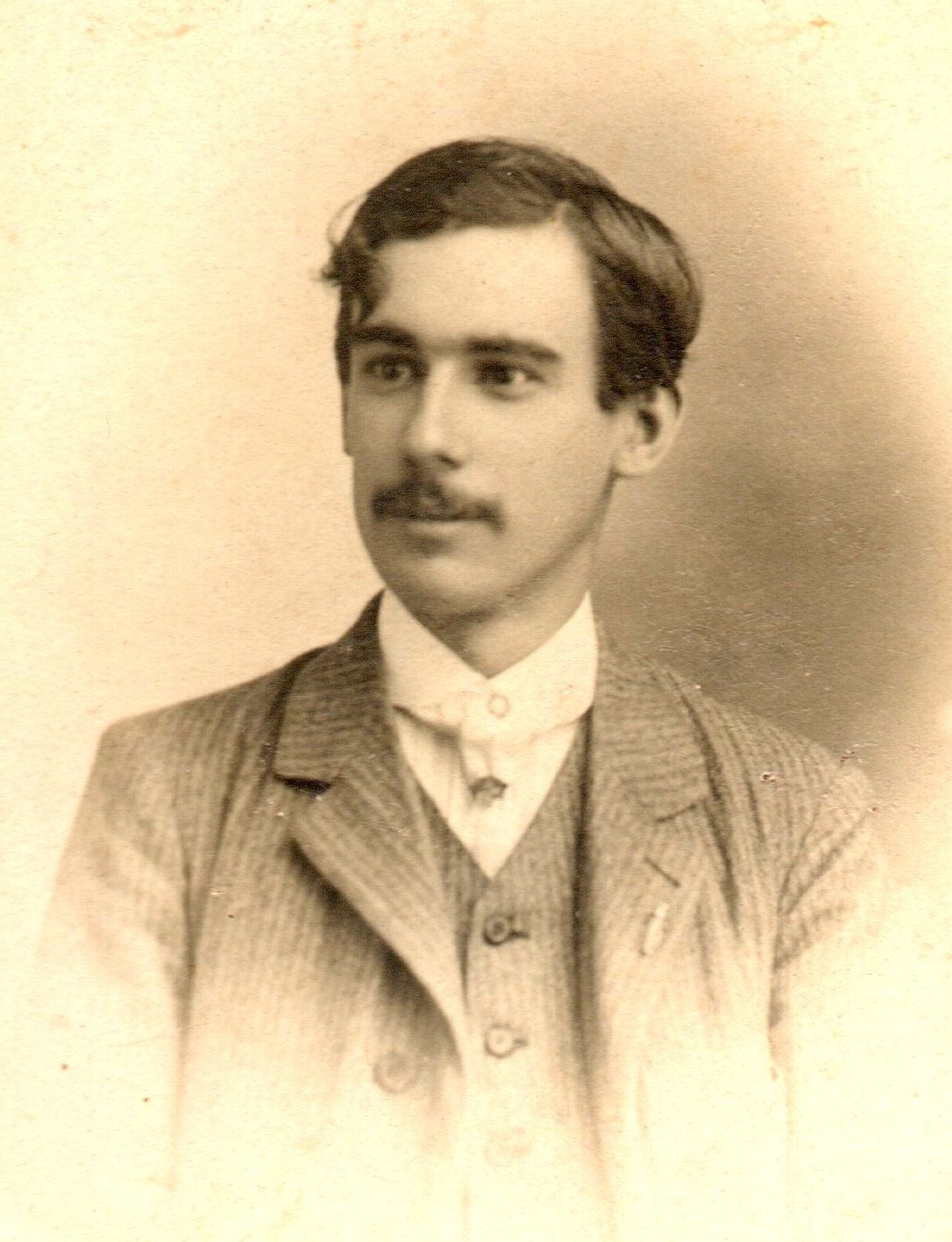
- Peyre in 1911
- Born: 9 September 1890; Le Cailar, Gard, France
- Died: 13 December 1961 (aged 71); Aigues-Vives, Gard, France
- Occupations: Poet, essayist
- Spouse: Amy Silvel
- Parents: Pierre Peyre (father); Emma Soulier (mother)

Sully-André Peyre (1890–1961) was a French poet and essayist. He wrote both in Provençal and in French. He won a prize from the Académie française.

== Early life ==
Sully-André Peyre was born on 9 September 1890 in Le Cailar, Gard, France. He grew up in Mouriès, Bouches-du-Rhône.

== Career ==
Peyre published Lou Secret, a Provençal paper in 1918. A year later, in 1919, he founded La Regalido, another Provençal journal, with Elie Vianes. He was the founder and editor of Marsyas, a Provençal review, from 1921 to 1961.

Peyre was the author of many poetry collections and essays. He wrote both in Provençal and in French. He won the Prix Broquette-Gonin from the Académie française for his 1958 book entitled Poésie.

== Personal life and death ==
Peyre married Amy Silvel, a poet.

Peyre died on 13 December 1961 in Aigues-Vives, Gard, France.

== Works ==
- Peyre, Sully-André (1929). Choix de poèmes. Le Cailar: Marsyas. OCLC 15669159.
- Peyre, Sully-André (1938). Saint Jean d'Été. Aigues-Vives: Marsyas. OCLC 2741926.
- Peyre, Sully-André (1948). Hercule. Aigues-Vives: Marsyas. OCLC 41149140.
- Peyre, Sully-André (1948). La branche des oiseaux. Aigues-Vives: Marsyas. OCLC 503702257.
- Peyre, Sully-André (1954). Colombier. Manosque: L'Artisan. OCLC 460734853.
- Peyre, Sully-André (1955). Folco de Baroncelli, poète provençal. Aigues-Vives: Marsyas. OCLC 743062902.
- Peyre, Sully-André (1959). Miralinde ou Le dix-huitième chameau. Aigues-Vives: Marsyas. OCLC 301437408.
- Peyre, Sully-André (1959). Essai sur Frédéric Mistral. Paris: Seghers. OCLC 2115660.
- Peyre, Sully-André (1962). Escriveto e la roso : pouèmo prouvençau emé la viraduro franceso. Aigues-Vives: Marsyas. OCLC 491747843.
- Peyre, Sully-André (1964). Mythes. Aigues-Vives: Marsyas. OCLC 19014863.
- Peyre, Sully-André (1966). La Cabro d'or : pouèmo prouvençau emé la viraduro franceso. Aigues-Vives: Marsyas. OCLC 460734847.
- Peyre, Sully-André (1967). Lambeaux pour Lemuel II. Paris: Seghers. OCLC 799077552.
- Peyre, Sully-André (1968). Li cansoun de Jaume Vivarés e de Bèumouno. Grans: M.-F. Delavouët. OCLC 717172247.
- Peyre, Sully-André (1969). Avau dins la coumbo. Toulon: L'Astrado. OCLC 462998426.
