= Saint-Sauveur-de-Peyre =

- Part of Peyre-en-Aubrac
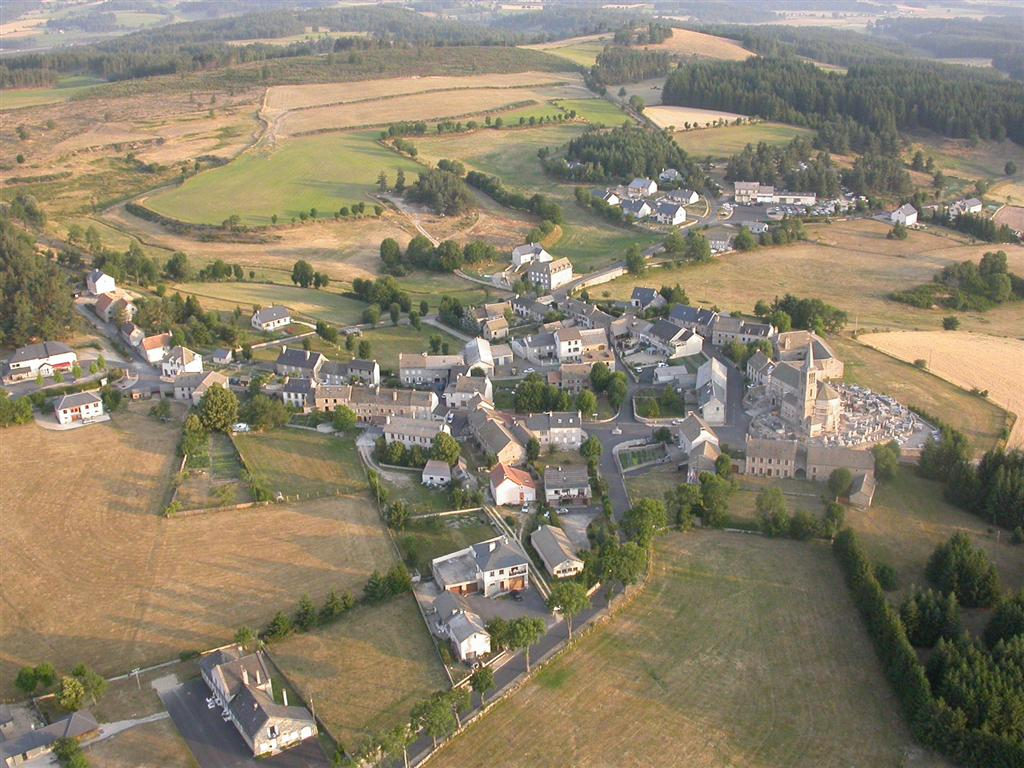
- An aerial view of Saint Sauveur de Peyre
- Location of Saint-Sauveur-de-Peyre
- Location within France Location within Occitanie
- Coordinates: 44°39′34″N 3°17′17″E
- Country: France
- Region: Occitania
- Department: Lozère
- Arrondissement: Mende
- Canton: Aumont-Aubrac
- Commune: Peyre-en-Aubrac
- Area^{1}: 27.61 km^{2} (10.66 sq mi)
- Elevation: 1,060 m (3,480 ft)
- Highest elevation: 1,180 m (3,870 ft)
- Lowest elevation: 852 m (2,795 ft)
- Population (2022): 247
  - Density: 8.95/km^{2} (23.2/sq mi)
- Time zone: UTC+01:00 (CET)
  - Summer (DST): UTC+02:00 (CEST)
- Postal code: 48130
- ^{1} French Land Register data, which excludes lakes, ponds, glaciers > 1 km^{2} (0.386 sq mi or 247 acres) and river estuaries.

Saint-Sauveur-de-Peyre (French pronunciation: [sɛ̃ sovœʁ də pɛʁ]; Occitan: Sent Sauvador de Peire) is a former commune in the Lozère department in southern France. On 1 January 2017, it was merged into the new commune Peyre-en-Aubrac. Its population was 247 in 2022.

== See also ==
- Communes of the Lozère department
