= Pere Estupinyà =

Spanish biochemist and popular science author

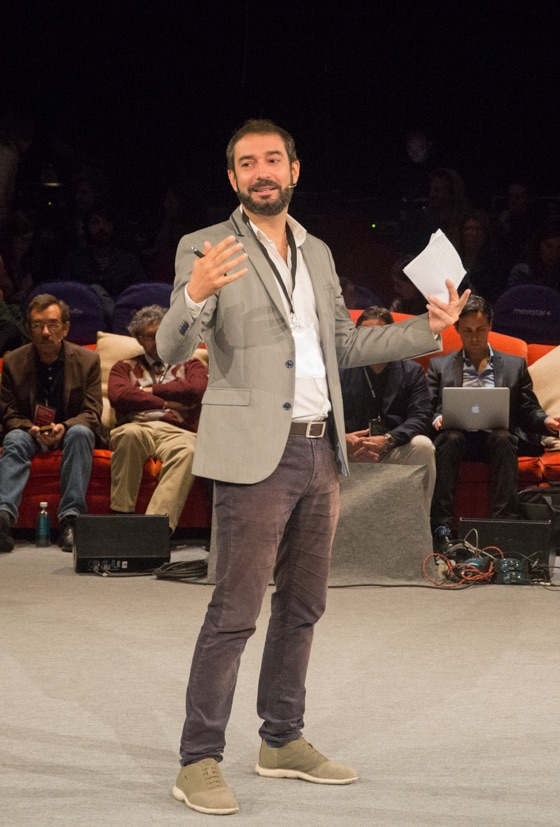
- Pere Estupinyà in 2016
- Born: Pere Estupinyà Giné; 1974 (age 51–52); Tortosa, Spain
- Occupation: Popular Science
- Website: https://www.perestupinya.com/

Pere Estupinyà Giné (born 17 October 1974) is a Spanish biochemist known for his work in popular science in books, conferences and TV shows.

== Biography ==
Born in Tortosa (Spain), he studied at the University of Rovira i Virgili in Tarragona, where he majored in biochemistry; he holds a master's in nutrition and metabolism as well and started a PhD in genetics, but gave up to work in popular science.

He has worked at Massachusetts Institute of Technology (MIT), in the National Institutes of Health (NIH) and the Inter-American Development Bank (IADB).

He wrote his first book – El ladrón de cerebros. Compartiendo el conocimiento científico de las mentes más brillantes – in 2010, and has since published several other popular science books. He started on TV in 2014 presenting a documentary for TV3 called Inversió de Futur ('Investment for the future'), and later he made a TV documentary based on his first book S=EX2. La ciencia del sexo, released in 2013. In 2015 he produced and presented 13 episodes of the show El ladrón de cerebros en Ecuador, and the following year he developed, in collaboration with Minifilms, El cazador de cerebros, for the Spanish national broadcaster TVE, which he also directed and presented. Since September 2016 he has participated in the radio weekend show A vivir que son dos días on Cadena SER.

== Awards ==
- 2024- CSIC-BBVA Foundation Prize for Scientific Communication for introducing “new ways of bringing science to all audiences, through television, radio and books, whilst maintaining rigour and achieving a significant impact”.
- 2025- Catalan Research Foundation Award, Joan Guinovart National Award for Scientific Communication “for his 24-year career in science journalism in Catalonia and internationally, across a wide range of fields and media outlets”.

== Books ==
- El ladrón de cerebros. Compartiendo el conocimiento científico de las mentes más brillantes (Debate, 2010)
- Rascar donde no pica (Debate, 2012)
- El sexo en la consulta médica (Debate, 2013)
- S=EX2. La ciencia del sexo (Debate, 2013)
- El ladrón de cerebros. Comer cerezas con los ojos cerrados (Debate, 2016)
- A vivir la ciencia. Las pasiones que despierta el conocimiento (Debate, 2020)
- Mitos y ciencia ( in collaboration with Blanca Torres) (La Galera, 2022) ISBN 978-84-246-7358-1
- La ciencia del sexo (abridged and updated version) (Debate, 2023) ISBN 978-84-19642-15-8
- ¿Qué quieres ser de mayor?: Cómo convertir la madurez en la mejor etapa de tu vida (Debate, 2026). ISBN 979-13-87904-11-1
