= Pere Riutort Mestre =

Spanish educationist, philologist and clergyman (1935–2021)

Pere Riutort i Mestre (Petra, Mallorca, Spain 1935-Tàrbena, Marina Baixa, Spain 21 November 2021) was a Spanish priest, pedagogue, philologue, and liturgist. He was one of the main promoters of the Catalan language in Majorca and also in the Valencian Community, where he had lived since 1971.

== Biography ==
He was born in Petra (Majorca) in 1935. He was a member of the "blauets de Lluc" (boys' choir) of the monastery of Lluc (1945), and became priest in the Missionaries of the Sacred hearts of Jesus and Mary in Mallorca. He got a degree in pedagogy, classical philology, theology and Catalan philology. From 1967 to 1969 he promoted the Catalan language through many schools from Mallorca. In 1971 he came to live in the Valencian Country. Since 1979 he was teacher of Catalan language in the University College of Castelló de la Plana. From 1984 to 1986 he taught didactics of the Catalan language in the School for the Formation of Teachers of Valencia. In 1986 he became senior lecturer and in 1996 he became professor of Catalan Philology in the University of Valencia.

He published between 1975 and 1977, in collaboration with Enric Valor, Manuel Sanchis i Guarner, J.L. Sanchis, F. Graell and J.C. Bellvert, several texts for the teaching of the Catalan language in the Valencian Country and the Balearic Islands. Among these, Els vents del món (The winds of the world) can be pointed out. He also worked in the edition of the Valencian liturgical texts in Catalan language, and was therefore he was president of the Commission that made the official adaptation of the liturgical books of the Second Vatican Council into Catalan language with the Valencian varieties. He also translated the Gospel into Catalan. He got the "Valencian of the Year" prize in 1977, that is awarded by Huguet Foundation. He was president of the "La Mata de Jonc" Foundation during his last years.

=== Interdiocesan Commission for liturgical texts in vernacular language ===
On 14 May 1973, the archbishop of Valencia, José María García Lahiguera, created an Interdiocesan Commission for texts in vernacular language. It included eighteen members, and Pere Riutort was chosen as its president by a decree issued by the archbishop of Valencia on 18 October 1973. As a result of the work of this commission, the Llibre del Poble de Déu (Book of the People of God) was published at the end of 1975. This book is a comprehensive summary of liturgical texts adapted to the Valencian variety of the Catalan language. In order to be able to publish this book, Pere Riutort had to sell some lands that he owned in Mallorca. The approval of this book was surrounded by controversy since the beginning, together with the birth of blaverism in the Valencian society.
