= Pere Maria Orts i Bosch =

Pere Maria Orts i Bosch (5 July 1921 – 26 February 2015) was a Valencian writer, historian, researcher, heraldist and art collector. He was a member of the Acadèmia Valenciana de la Llengua (Valencian Language Academy) and was awarded the High Distinction of the Generalitat Valenciana in 2006.

== Biography ==
He was born in the city of Valencia on 5 July 1921. He went to the High School in the Piarist School of Valencia. Although he graduated in Law from in the University of Valencia in 1945, and his historian grandfather Pere Maria Orts i Berdin (1839) was a judge of the Superior Court of Valencia, he never practiced it.

When he was 45 years-old, Orts moved to Benidorm, where his paternal family lived, to conduct research directly related to la Marina (Marina Alta and Marina Baixa). His main goal was to find documents and works of art that were actually from the ancient Kingdom of Valencia, hoping to complete Valencian patrimony and part of its lost history. As an art sponsor, he enlarged his family heritage by buying many works of art. He searched for unique objects in libraries, archives and museums outside Valencian Country, eventually donating most of them to Valencian public institutions, particularly to:

- Valencian Library: more than 11.000 volumes donated, including 13 incunables.
- Museum of Fine Arts of Valencia saint Pius V: 229 paintings from the Trecento until the 20th century were donated, as were artistic objects of great value. These encompassed 10 sculptures, chinaware of the Indian Company, glass from Murano, and a combined 69 pieces pottery both from Spain (Manises, Talavera, l'Alcora and Ribesalbes) and other countries (China, Japan and France).

Among his other donations were 3 tapestries, 7 chalices, several candelabrums, 9 pieces of furniture, and even a silver writing desk.

He died on 26 February 2015.

== Writings ==
Works Orts wrote himself included:

=== Catalan Works ===
- Arribada d'una imatge de la Verge a Benidorm (1972).
- Introducció a la història de la Vila-Joiosa i el notari Andreu Mayor (1972).
- L'almirall Bernat de Sarrià i la Carta de Poblament de Benidorm (1976).
- Història de la Senyera al País Valencià (1979) .
- Carta Pobla de Benidorm (1987).
- Carta Pobla d'Altea (1988).
- Carta Pobla de la Núcia (1989).
- Notes sobre certs topònims valencians en el Llibre dels fets del rei En Jaume (1994) in the Saitabi review of the Faculty of Geography and History of the University of Valencia.

=== Spanish Works ===
- Una imagen de la Virgen en Benidorm (1965).
- Alicante, notas históricas (1373–1800) (1971).
- Regalismo en el siglo XVI. Sus implicaciones políticas en la Diputación de Valencia (1971).
- Los Borja: de Xàtiva a Roma. Notas acerca del origen y ascenso de los Borja (1995).

Additionally, he wrote many articles about the history of Benidorm and the toponymy of the Marina Baixa in a review of the local holidays of Benidorm, many prologues for other books, and articles for collective works. He also collaborated with studies about genealogy and heraldry in the Great Encyclopedia of the Valencian Region (1972–77).

== Awards and recognitions ==
- Official Chronicle and Adopted Son of Benidorm (23 December 1985).
- Honour Award of the Valencian Letters (1996).
- Honour Academic of the Saint Charles Royal Academy of Fine Arts of Valencia since 1999.
- Honorary Son and Golden Medal of the City of Valencia.
- High Distinction of the Generalitat Valenciana (2006).
- City of Benidorm cultural award (9 October 2008)

== Positions ==
- Member of the Board of the Museum of Fine Arts of Valencia Saint Pius V (2001).
- Member of the Valencian Academy of Language (2001).
- Member of the Council of Libraries of the Education Department of the Generalitat Valenciana since 1987.
- Counselor of the commission for grants for the study of Valencian culture in 2000, 2003 and 2007.
- Member of the judging panel for the Alfons el Magnànim prize in poetry in Valencian (2003).
