= Pere Garriga Cazorla =

Spanish chess grandmaster (born 1998)

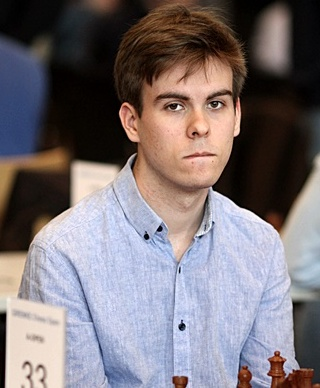
- Garriga Cazrola in 2017

Personal information
- Born: December 14, 1998 (age 27) Mollet del Vallès, Spain

Chess career
- Country: Spain
- Title: Grandmaster (2024)
- FIDE rating: 2475 (July 2026)
- Peak rating: 2511 (August 2022)

Pere Garriga Cazorla is a Spanish chess grandmaster.

== Chess career ==
In July 2013, he earned his first IM norm at the Montcada i Reixach International Open.

In April 2014, he won the Catalan Youth Chess Championship.

In September 2016, he earned his final IM norm in the Sabadell International Open.

He achieved the Grandmaster title in 2024, after earning his norms at the:

- Grenke Chess Open A in April 2019
- Llobregat Open Chess Grupo A in December 2021
- XXV Open Internacional d’Escacs Sants Ciutat de Barcelona in September 2024
